= List of Rock Band Network 2.0 songs =

The Rock Band Network in the music video game Rock Band 3 supports downloadable songs for the Xbox 360 and PlayStation 3 versions through the consoles' respective online services. The Rock Band Network Store became publicly available on March 4, 2010 for all Xbox 360 players in selected countries (US, Canada, UK, France, Italy, Germany, Spain, Sweden, and Singapore). Rock Band Network songs are available on the PlayStation 3 in five song intervals through their own Rock Band Network Store on April 22, 2010. Rock Band Network songs are exclusive to the Xbox 360 for 30 days, after which a selection of songs are made available on the PlayStation 3. No Rock Band Network 2.0 songs have been released for the Wii in accordance with the discontinued service of Rock Band Network 1.0 for the Wii.

With the release of Rock Band Network 2.0, creators were able to add songs with harmony vocals, standard and pro mode keyboard tracks, and pro drum tracks. Support for pro guitar and bass was not included in RBN 2.0 due to the complexity of authoring such tracks and the small base of pro guitar users/testers.

On February 13, 2013, Harmonix announced that RBN ports to the PlayStation 3 are scheduled to end on April 2, 2013, along with regular DLC releases. Harmonix initially planned to continue to support the backend tools powering the RBN for the Xbox 360; however, support for the RBN officially ended in September 2014 due to numerous technical issues as well as the company devoting resources to other projects.

== Pricing ==
Prices for Rock Band Network songs are set by the parties involved with authoring and submitting the song, and can be set at either US$1.00, $1.99, or $2.99. The artist retains 30% of this cost, with the remaining 70% of each sale split between Harmonix and Microsoft (although the exact ratios of that distribution are unknown).

== Complete list of available songs ==
The following songs have been released to the Rock Band Network 2.0. New songs are initially released exclusively for Xbox Live. 30 days after their initial release, songs are eligible to be brought over to the PlayStation 3. Dates listed are the initial release of songs on Xbox Live. Starting March 4, 2010, all downloadable songs are available in the United States, Canada, the United Kingdom, France, Italy, Germany, Spain, Sweden, and Singapore, unless noted. All songs are capable of being changed or removed at any time.

Song title	Artist	Decade	Genre	Release date (Xbox 360)	Release date (PlayStation 3)
"Blue (Da Ba Dee)"	Eiffel 65	1990s	Pop/Dance/Electronic	Mar 15, 2011	Jul 5, 2011
"Airbrushed" (Note: Song was later included as Rock Band 4 official DLC.)	Anamanaguchi	2010s	Pop/Dance/Electronic	Mar 23, 2011	Jun 14, 2011
"28 Days"	Mafia Track Suit	2010s	Alternative	Mar 28, 2011	Dec 11, 2012
"Andromeda"	Bluefusion	2010s	Prog	Mar 28, 2011	Jul 12, 2011
"Happy People"	Big Kenny	2000s	Country	Mar 28, 2011	Mar 13, 2012
"Buried Cold (RB3 version)"	Rose of Jericho	2000s	Pop-Rock	Apr 6, 2011	Aug 2, 2011
"Fight For Greatness"	Bloom	2010s	Indie Rock	Apr 6, 2011	Jun 14, 2011
"Slaughterhouse, Obituaries and a Love Story"	Arcadia	2010s	Metal	Apr 6, 2011	No
"You Will Leave a Mark"	A Silent Film	2010s	Alternative	Apr 6, 2011	Jun 14, 2011
"Audience and Audio"	Twin Atlantic	2000s	Alternative	Apr 11, 2011	Sep 13, 2011
"Money"	Madlife	2010s	Metal	Apr 11, 2011	No
"Deception - Concealing Fate Part Two"	TesseracT	2010s	Prog	Apr 12, 2011	Jun 21, 2011
"Deception - Concealing Fate Part Two (2x Bass Pedal)"	TesseracT	2010s	Prog	Apr 12, 2011	Apr 2, 2013
"Forest"	Verax	2010s	Alternative	Apr 12, 2011	No
"Spaghetti Cat (I Weep For You)"	Parry Gripp	2000s	Novelty	Apr 12, 2011	Jun 14, 2011
"Africa (RB3 version)"	Quartered	2000s	Prog	Apr 15, 2011	Jan 31, 2012
"Find Beauty"	Rose of Jericho	2010s	Pop-Rock	Apr 15, 2011	Jul 19, 2011
"Forest for the Trees"	Mafia Track Suit	2010s	Alternative	Apr 15, 2011	No
"Lost Soul"	Amberian Dawn	2000s	Metal	Apr 15, 2011	Jun 14, 2011
"Payback (Come On)"	BioShaft	2010s	Rock	Apr 15, 2011	No
"Thou Shall Not Fear"	Lazarus A.D.	2000s	Metal	Apr 15, 2011	Jun 28, 2011
"Animal"	Kink Ador	2000s	Rock	Apr 18, 2011	Jan 8, 2013
"Half Crazy"	Jukebox the Ghost	2010s	Pop-Rock	Apr 18, 2011	Jun 21, 2011
"(pin)Ballz"	Insomniac Games	2000s	Rock	Apr 21, 2011	Jul 19, 2011
"Chameleon Carneval"	Andromeda	2000s	Prog	Apr 21, 2011	Jun 21, 2011
"Everyone"	Madlife	2010s	Metal	Apr 21, 2011	No
"Hair Trigger"	The Acro-Brats	2010s	Punk	Apr 21, 2011	Jul 5, 2011
"The Curse"	Amberian Dawn	2000s	Metal	Apr 21, 2011	Jun 28, 2011
"The Depths of Memory"	NightShade	2010s	Metal	Apr 21, 2011	Jun 28, 2011
"The Depths of Memory (2x Bass Pedal)"	NightShade	2010s	Metal	Apr 21, 2011	No
"Veil of Illumination (Part 1)"	Andromeda	2000s	Prog	Apr 21, 2011	Jun 21, 2011
"Veil of Illumination (Part 2)"	Andromeda	2000s	Prog	Apr 21, 2011	Jun 21, 2011
"Zig Zag Talk"	Steve Fister	2000s	Blues	Apr 21, 2011	No
"A Grim Struggle"	Nightrage	2000s	Metal	Apr 22, 2011	Jun 28, 2011
"Angela Surf City"	The Walkmen	2010s	Rock	Apr 22, 2011	Jun 28, 2011
"Beat Fly"	Tiny Danza	2010s	Hip-Hop/Rap	Apr 28, 2011	Jul 5, 2011
"Dawn of the Condoms"	Ultra Saturday	2010s	Punk	Apr 28, 2011	Sep 20, 2011
"Dodgin Bullets"	Steve Fister	2000s	Blues	Apr 28, 2011	Jun 12, 2012
"Doll in the Dust"	Kurodust	2010s	Rock	Apr 28, 2011	No
"Leave Me Be"	Kylie D. Hart	2010s	Country	Apr 28, 2011	Mar 13, 2012
"River of Glass"	Rishloo	2000s	Prog	Apr 28, 2011	Aug 23, 2011
"Satisfying Angst"	The Blackout Argument	2010s	Punk	Apr 28, 2011	No
"Self Medicate"	Felsen	2000s	Alternative	Apr 28, 2011	No
"The Window"	Raven Quinn	2010s	Rock	Apr 28, 2011	Sep 28, 2011
"Hangman"	Drugstore Fanatics	2000s	Alternative	May 5, 2011	Aug 2, 2011
"Hey I"	Blackberry Wednesday	2010s	Rock	May 5, 2011	Jul 5, 2011
"Katsushika"	Rishloo	2000s	Prog	May 5, 2011	Jul 26, 2011
"My Star"	Andromeda	2000s	Prog	May 5, 2011	Jul 5, 2011
"Passing Bells"	Amberian Dawn	2000s	Metal	May 5, 2011	Nov 22, 2011
"Queen Bee"	Tina Guo	2010s	Metal	May 5, 2011	Jul 12, 2011
"Seestrasse"	Killbody Tuning	2010s	Indie Rock	May 5, 2011	No
"Stay Alive"	Rivethead	2000s	Metal	May 5, 2011	No
"The Final Episode (Let's Change the Channel) (RB3 version)"	Asking Alexandria	2000s	Metal	May 5, 2011	Jul 12, 2011
"Underground"	Wargasm	1990s	Metal	May 5, 2011	No
"Willow of Tears"	Amberian Dawn	2000s	Metal	May 5, 2011	Oct 25, 2011
"Another Step"	Andromeda	2000s	Prog	May 12, 2011	Jul 12, 2011
"Dreamchaser"	Amberian Dawn	2000s	Metal	May 12, 2011	Aug 2, 2011
"Dreamchaser (2x Bass Pedal)"	Amberian Dawn	2000s	Metal	May 12, 2011	No
"Eden"	TesseracT	2010s	Prog	May 12, 2011	Sep 6, 2011
"Give It Up! Give It Up!"	His Statue Falls	2010s	Metal	May 12, 2011	Aug 23, 2011
"I Hate"	Madlife	2010s	Metal	May 12, 2011	No
"Revenants"	The Cold Goodnight	2000s	Alternative	May 12, 2011	Jan 3, 2012
"Schizophrenia"	Jukebox the Ghost	2010s	Pop-Rock	May 12, 2011	Jul 26, 2011
"Trying Hard"	Loni Rose	2000s	Country	May 12, 2011	Sep 28, 2011
"Alaska"	Between the Buried and Me	2000s	Metal	May 19, 2011	Jul 19, 2011
"Alaska (2x Bass Pedal)"	Between the Buried and Me	2000s	Metal	May 19, 2011	Oct 11, 2011
"Arctica"	Amberian Dawn	2010s	Metal	May 19, 2011	Sep 13, 2011
"Be Right Here"	Mind At Risk	2010s	Rock	May 19, 2011	Jan 24, 2012
"Burning Hearts"	Silverstein	2010s	Rock	May 19, 2011	Jul 26, 2011
"Country Song"	Seether	2010s	Rock	May 19, 2011	Jul 12, 2011
"Go North"	The Pauses	2010s	Indie Rock	May 19, 2011	Nov 8, 2011
"Halftime"	Freen in Green	2010s	Novelty	May 19, 2011	No
"Machine Gun Kisses"	Murder FM	2010s	Metal	May 19, 2011	No
"Magnolia"	Texas in July	2010s	Metal	May 19, 2011	Jul 26, 2011
"Magnolia (2x Bass Pedal)"	Texas in July	2010s	Metal	May 19, 2011	No
"Mayhem"	Mortice	2010s	Rock	May 19, 2011	No
"Mercury Blooming"	Askari Nari	2010s	Pop/Dance/Electronic	May 19, 2011	No
"Riptide Resort"	Freen in Green	2010s	Prog	May 19, 2011	Jan 3, 2012
"Sick, Sick, Sick"	Bayside	2010s	Alternative	May 19, 2011	Jul 19, 2011
"Too Little Too Late"	A Skylit Drive	2010s	Alternative	May 19, 2011	Jul 19, 2011
"Bamberg"	Killbody Tuning	2010s	Indie Rock	May 26, 2011	No
"California"	Winds of Plague	2010s	Metal	May 26, 2011	Jan 17, 2012
"Crazy"	Nonpoint	2010s	Rock	May 26, 2011	Aug 9, 2011
"Last Chance"	Tetrafusion	2010s	Prog	May 26, 2011	Jan 24, 2012
"Marker of Change"	Killbody Tuning	2010s	Indie Rock	May 26, 2011	No
"Midnight Eyes (RB3 version)"	Rose of Jericho	2010s	Pop-Rock	May 26, 2011	Sep 6, 2011
"My Only Star"	Amberian Dawn	2000s	Metal	May 26, 2011	Feb 14, 2012
"Pressure Cooker"	Magnus 'SoulEye' Pålsson	2010s	Pop/Dance/Electronic	May 26, 2011	Aug 2, 2011
"Rain"	Indestructible Noise Command	2000s	Metal	May 26, 2011	No
"The Devil's in the Details"	Aesthetic Perfection	2010s	Pop/Dance/Electronic	May 26, 2011	Jun 5, 2012
"This Round's On Me"	Blackguard	2000s	Metal	May 26, 2011	Oct 2, 2012
"Turning Sheep Into Goats/Systematomatic"	Rishloo	2000s	Prog	May 26, 2011	Aug 30, 2011
"30 Lives"	The Motion Sick	2000s	Indie Rock	Jun 2, 2011	Feb 14, 2012
"Arctica (2x Bass Pedal)"	Amberian Dawn	2010s	Metal	Jun 2, 2011	No
"Be Careful What You Wish For"	Memphis May Fire	2010s	Metal	Jun 2, 2011	Sep 20, 2011
"Be Careful What You Wish For (2x Bass Pedal)"	Memphis May Fire	2010s	Metal	Jun 2, 2011	No
"Better Off This Way"	A Day to Remember	2010s	Rock	Jun 2, 2011	Aug 2, 2011
"Blackbird"	Amberian Dawn	2010s	Metal	Jun 2, 2011	Mar 6, 2012
"Blackbird (2x Bass Pedal)"	Amberian Dawn	2010s	Metal	Jun 2, 2011	No
"Curse of the Werewolf"	Timeless Miracle	2000s	Metal	Jun 2, 2011	Jul 26, 2011
"Death of an Era"	No Bragging Rights	2010s	Metal	Jun 2, 2011	No
"Death of an Era (2x Bass Pedal)"	No Bragging Rights	2010s	Metal	Jun 2, 2011	No
"Demons With Ryu"	Emmure	2010s	Metal	Jun 2, 2011	Aug 23, 2011
"Demons With Ryu (2x Bass Pedal)"	Emmure	2010s	Metal	Jun 2, 2011	No
"Deny"	Betrayed by Sorrow	2000s	Rock	Jun 2, 2011	Jul 17, 2012
"Empire"	Jukebox the Ghost	2010s	Pop-Rock	Jun 2, 2011	Sep 13, 2011
"Fallen Into You"	Kings Queens & Fairytales	2010s	Rock	Jun 2, 2011	Sep 13, 2011
"Firefight"	Blackguard	2010s	Metal	Jun 2, 2011	Apr 24, 2012
"Firefight (2x Bass Pedal)"	Blackguard	2010s	Metal	Jun 2, 2011	No
"Miracle"	Nonpoint	2010s	Rock	Jun 2, 2011	Aug 9, 2011
"Positive Force"	Magnus 'SoulEye' Pålsson	2010s	Pop/Dance/Electronic	Jun 2, 2011	Aug 9, 2011
"Suffer"	Stretford End	2010s	Alternative	Jun 2, 2011	No
"The Resolve of Cowards"	Burning Twilight	2010s	Metal	Jun 2, 2011	No
"The Resolve of Cowards (2x Bass Pedal)"	Burning Twilight	2010s	Metal	Jun 2, 2011	No
"Torture"	Rival Sons	2010s	Rock	Jun 2, 2011	Jan 17, 2012
"City of Corruption"	Amberian Dawn	2010s	Metal	Jun 9, 2011	Oct 11, 2011
"City of Corruption (2x Bass Pedal)"	Amberian Dawn	2010s	Metal	Jun 9, 2011	Oct 11, 2011
"Curse of the Werewolf (2x Bass Pedal)"	Timeless Miracle	2000s	Metal	Jun 9, 2011	No
"Epic Symphony in A Flat Minor, Third Movement: Zero Hour"	Van Friscia	2010s	Prog	Jun 9, 2011	Aug 23, 2011
"Epic Symphony in A Flat Minor, Third Movement: Zero Hour (2x Bass Pedal)"	Van Friscia	2010s	Prog	Jun 9, 2011	No
"Familiar"	CyLeW	2000s	Alternative	Jun 9, 2011	Feb 26, 2013
"How Far"	Synthetic Elements	2000s	Punk	Jun 9, 2011	No
"My Future Life"	Mafia Track Suit	2010s	Alternative	Jun 9, 2011	No
"No Ghost"	The Haunted	2010s	Metal	Jun 9, 2011	Dec 11, 2012
"Ooops"	Garden of Eden	2010s	Rock	Jun 9, 2011	No
"Rocket Car"	Robotmakers	2010s	New Wave	Jun 9, 2011	No
"Slander"	Dr. Acula	2010s	Metal	Jun 9, 2011	Oct 23, 2012
"Slander (2x Bass Pedal)"	Dr. Acula	2010s	Metal	Jun 9, 2011	No
"Stay Awake"	Stretford End	2010s	Alternative	Jun 9, 2011	No
"The Battle of Lil' Slugger (Remix)"	dB Soundworks	2010s	Pop/Dance/Electronic	Jun 9, 2011	Aug 9, 2011
"A Blinding Light"	Blackguard	2010s	Metal	Jun 16, 2011	Jul 24, 2012
"A Blinding Light (2x Bass Pedal)"	Blackguard	2010s	Metal	Jun 16, 2011	No
"Adicto al Dolor (Lágrimas)"	Don Tetto	2000s	Rock	Jun 16, 2011	No
"Against the Wall"	Ill Niño	2010s	Metal	Jun 16, 2011	Jan 31, 2012
"Blood & Scars"	Grynd Rodd Muse	2010s	Rock	Jun 16, 2011	No
"Come Now Follow"	Amberian Dawn	2010s	Metal	Jun 16, 2011	Jul 31, 2012
"Come Now Follow (2x Bass Pedal)"	Amberian Dawn	2010s	Metal	Jun 16, 2011	No
"Dead Again"	Possible Oscar	2000s	Rock	Jun 16, 2011	Aug 16, 2011
"Expert Mode"	LeetStreet Boys	2010s	Pop-Rock	Jun 16, 2011	Sep 6, 2011
"Fallido Intento"	Don Tetto	2000s	Rock	Jun 16, 2011	No
"Field of Serpents"	Amberian Dawn	2010s	Metal	Jun 16, 2011	Jun 19, 2012
"Field of Serpents (2x Bass Pedal)"	Amberian Dawn	2010s	Metal	Jun 16, 2011	No
"Fists Fall"	Otep	2010s	Metal	Jun 16, 2011	Feb 28, 2012
"Good Things"	Hella Donna	2000s	Pop-Rock	Jun 16, 2011	No
"Hurricane"	The Cold Goodnight	2000s	Alternative	Jun 16, 2011	Aug 21, 2012
"New Solution"	SHIROCK	2010s	Alternative	Jun 16, 2011	Nov 27, 2012
"Rain (2x Bass Pedal)"	Indestructible Noise Command	2000s	Metal	Jun 16, 2011	No
"Sampo"	Amberian Dawn	2010s	Metal	Jun 16, 2011	Aug 21, 2012
"Sampo (2x Bass Pedal)"	Amberian Dawn	2010s	Metal	Jun 16, 2011	No
"Stuck in a Rut"	Hip Kitty	2000s	Rock	Jun 16, 2011	No
"Talisman"	Amberian Dawn	2010s	Metal	Jun 16, 2011	Apr 10, 2012
"Talisman (2x Bass Pedal)"	Amberian Dawn	2010s	Metal	Jun 16, 2011	No
"The Mettle of a Man"	Where the Ocean Meets the Sky	2010s	Metal	Jun 16, 2011	No
"Tonight We Ride"	Reform the Resistance	2010s	Rock	Jun 16, 2011	No
"What's Left of Me"	Blessthefall	2000s	Alternative	Jun 16, 2011	Aug 9, 2011
"Zombies!! (Coming Out Tonight)"	Ultra Saturday	2010s	Punk	Jun 16, 2011	Aug 23, 2011
"Betus Blues (Retro Remix)"	dB Soundworks	2010s	Pop/Dance/Electronic	Jun 23, 2011	Aug 30, 2011
"Diachylon"	Chaotrope	2010s	Metal	Jun 23, 2011	Feb 7, 2012
"Froggy's Lament"	Buckner & Garcia	1990s	Pop-Rock	Jun 23, 2011	Aug 16, 2011
"Hyperspace"	Buckner & Garcia	1990s	Pop-Rock	Jun 23, 2011	Aug 16, 2011
"Masters of Puppet Rock"	Action Action	2010s	Alternative	Jun 23, 2011	No
"Mousetrap"	Buckner & Garcia	1990s	Pop-Rock	Jun 23, 2011	Aug 16, 2011
"Namaste"	Veil of Maya	2000s	Metal	Jun 23, 2011	Oct 18, 2011
"Pac-Man Fever"	Buckner & Garcia	1990s	Pop-Rock	Jun 23, 2011	Aug 16, 2011
"Prototype Death Machine"	Bonded by Blood	2010s	Metal	Jun 23, 2011	No
"Rise and Shine"	Destruction of a Rose	2010s	Metal	Jun 23, 2011	No
"Rise and Shine (2x Bass Pedal)"	Destruction of a Rose	2010s	Metal	Jun 23, 2011	No
"The Exit"	I Am Cassettes	2010s	Alternative	Jun 23, 2011	No
"Underground (2x Bass Pedal)"	Wargasm	1990s	Metal	Jun 23, 2011	No
"Bed Intruder Song (feat. Kelly Dodson)"	Antoine Dodson & The Gregory Brothers	2010s	Pop/Dance/Electronic	Jun 30, 2011	Aug 30, 2011
"Bland Street Bloom"	SikTh	2000s	Metal	Jun 30, 2011	Sep 25, 2012
"Bland Street Bloom (2x Bass Pedal)"	SikTh	2000s	Metal	Jun 30, 2011	No
"By the Grace of the Grill"	Graveyard BBQ	2000s	Metal	Jun 30, 2011	Sep 18, 2012
"Foundation"	An Unkindness	2010s	Alternative	Jun 30, 2011	Feb 7, 2012
"Ghostly Echoes"	Amberian Dawn	2010s	Metal	Jun 30, 2011	Jun 19, 2012
"Ghostly Echoes (2x Bass Pedal)"	Amberian Dawn	2010s	Metal	Jun 30, 2011	No
"Morte et Dabo"	Asking Alexandria	2010s	Metal	Jun 30, 2011	Sep 6, 2011
"Morte et Dabo (2x Bass Pedal)"	Asking Alexandria	2010s	Metal	Jun 30, 2011	Oct 11, 2011
"New Ground"	The Story Changes	2000s	Punk	Jun 30, 2011	No
"Pray for Plagues"	Bring Me the Horizon	2000s	Metal	Jun 30, 2011	Aug 30, 2011
"Queendom"	B.et.a and The Neon Panthers	2010s	Pop/Dance/Electronic	Jun 30, 2011	Jan 8, 2013
"Slaves to Substance"	Suicide Silence	2010s	Metal	Jun 30, 2011	Feb 7, 2012
"Slaves to Substance (2x Bass Pedal)"	Suicide Silence	2010s	Metal	Jun 30, 2011	No
"Sweet#hart"	Closure in Moscow	2000s	Prog	Jun 30, 2011	Sep 20, 2011
"You Only Live Once"	Suicide Silence	2010s	Metal	Jun 30, 2011	Nov 1, 2011
"You Only Live Once (2x Bass Pedal)"	Suicide Silence	2010s	Metal	Jun 30, 2011	No
"Ziltoidia Attaxx!!"	Devin Townsend	2000s	Metal	Jun 30, 2011	Jan 10, 2012
"Ziltoidia Attaxx!! (2x Bass Pedal)"	Devin Townsend	2000s	Metal	Jun 30, 2011	No
"Better Life"	Conditions	2010s	Rock	Jul 7, 2011	Nov 1, 2011
"Caves"	Chiodos	2010s	Rock	Jul 7, 2011	Aug 30, 2011
"Circus Freak"	Standing Shadows	2010s	Rock	Jul 7, 2011	No
"Cool Concoction"	Shylo Elliott	2010s	Fusion	Jul 7, 2011	No
"Dawn of Spring"	Christopher J.	2010s	Other	Jul 7, 2011	Jan 3, 2012
"Envision"	Severed	2010s	Metal	Jul 7, 2011	No
"Fame Is Free"	Child of Glass feat. Suela	2010s	Pop/Dance/Electronic	Jul 7, 2011	No
"Farewell, Mona Lisa"	The Dillinger Escape Plan	2010s	Metal	Jul 7, 2011	Oct 4, 2011
"Glow"	Alien Ant Farm	2000s	Alternative	Jul 7, 2011	Oct 4, 2011
"Grant Me Peace"	Fallen Angel	2010s	Metal	Jul 7, 2011	No
"Over the Top"	White Wizzard	2010s	Metal	Jul 7, 2011	Apr 3, 2012
"Rebel On My Side"	Casey James Prestwood	2010s	Country	Jul 7, 2011	No
"Ship With No Sails"	Neonfly	2010s	Prog	Jul 7, 2011	Sep 28, 2011
"Ship With No Sails (2x Bass Pedal)"	Neonfly	2010s	Prog	Jul 7, 2011	No
"Turn Around"	Bumblefoot	2000s	Rock	Jul 7, 2011	Jan 31, 2012
"3 In The Morning"	Teflon Don feat. Antonio Cooke	2010s	R&B/Soul/Funk	Jul 14, 2011	No
"A Circus"	My Wooden LeG	2010s	Other	Jul 14, 2011	No
"Bad Things"	Gladhander	2000s	Grunge	Jul 14, 2011	No
"Betrayed"	Musica Diablo	2010s	Metal	Jul 14, 2011	Dec 11, 2012
"Daydreamer"	Mute Defeat	2010s	Rock	Jul 14, 2011	No
"Desecration Day"	Halcyon Way	2010s	Metal	Jul 14, 2011	Jul 10, 2012
"Evelene"	Synthetic Elements	2000s	Punk	Jul 14, 2011	No
"Farewell, Mona Lisa (2x Bass Pedal)"	The Dillinger Escape Plan	2010s	Metal	Jul 14, 2011	No
"Für Elise (Beethoven)"	Magnefora	2010s	Classical	Jul 14, 2011	Dec 18, 2012
"Goodbye Goldblatt"	Love Crushed Velvet	2010s	Rock	Jul 14, 2011	No
"Inheritors"	Serianna	2010s	Metal	Jul 14, 2011	Jan 15, 2013
"Low Life in the Fast Lane"	Pump	2000s	Rock	Jul 14, 2011	No
"Megalodon"	Mastodon	2000s	Metal	Jul 14, 2011	Sep 20, 2011
"Need Strange"	Chad Smith's Bombastic Meatbats	2000s	R&B/Soul/Funk	Jul 14, 2011	Nov 8, 2011
"Pendulum"	After the Burial	2010s	Metal	Jul 14, 2011	Sep 28, 2011
"Piano Sonata No. 11 - Ronda Alla Turca (Mozart)"	Thomas Walker	2010s	Classical	Jul 14, 2011	Sep 6, 2011
"Preacher & Devil"	Noah Engh The Kid Fantastic	2010s	Country	Jul 14, 2011	No
"Seahorse Seahell"	Lions!Tigers!Bears!	2010s	Metal	Jul 14, 2011	No
"Sinner's Vengeance"	Fallen Angel	2010s	Metal	Jul 14, 2011	No
"Still Young"	SHIROCK	2010s	Alternative	Jul 14, 2011	Nov 27, 2012
"The Difference Between Medicine and Poison is in the Dose"	Circa Survive	2000s	Alternative	Jul 14, 2011	Sep 20, 2011
"The Nightrager"	Bob Katsionis	2000s	Metal	Jul 14, 2011	No
"The Stars"	Jukebox the Ghost	2010s	Pop-Rock	Jul 14, 2011	Sep 13, 2011
"The Sword"	Blackguard	2000s	Metal	Jul 14, 2011	No
"The Sword (2x Bass Pedal)"	Blackguard	2000s	Metal	Jul 14, 2011	No
"This Round's On Me (2x Bass Pedal)"	Blackguard	2000s	Metal	Jul 14, 2011	No
"Whiskey's Got A Job To Do"	Karla Davis	2010s	Country	Jul 14, 2011	Nov 29, 2011
"By Your Command"	Devin Townsend	2000s	Metal	Jul 21, 2011	Jun 26, 2012
"By Your Command (2x Bass Pedal)"	Devin Townsend	2000s	Metal	Jul 21, 2011	No
"Category I: Slave to the Empirical"	Ethereal Collapse	2000s	Metal	Jul 21, 2011	No
"Fragments"	Serianna	2010s	Metal	Jul 21, 2011	Jan 15, 2013
"Fragments (2x Bass Pedal)"	Serianna	2010s	Metal	Jul 21, 2011	No
"Paper (Feat. Single White Infidel)"	Bluefusion	2000s	Punk	Jul 21, 2011	No
"Regret"	Dan Rothery	2000s	Pop-Rock	Jul 21, 2011	No
"Stabbing the Drama"	Soilwork	2000s	Metal	Jul 21, 2011	Sep 28, 2011
"The Fall of Psilanthropy"	Chaotrope	2010s	Metal	Jul 21, 2011	May 29, 2012
"The Grinding Wheels of War"	Fallen Angel	2010s	Metal	Jul 21, 2011	No
"The Nightrager (2x Bass Pedal)"	Bob Katsionis	2000s	Metal	Jul 21, 2011	No
"The Thief in the Night - Part I"	Chaotrope	2010s	Metal	Jul 21, 2011	Jan 3, 2012
"These City Lights"	Rose of Jericho	2000s	Pop-Rock	Jul 21, 2011	Oct 4, 2011
"Bagatelle No. 25 - Für Elise (Beethoven)"	Thomas Walker	2010s	Classical	Jul 28, 2011	Oct 4, 2011
"Battle of Egos Part I"	Winter Crescent	2000s	Metal	Jul 28, 2011	No
"Battle of Egos Part I (2x Bass Pedal)"	Winter Crescent	2000s	Metal	Jul 28, 2011	No
"Betrayed (2x Bass Pedal)"	Musica Diablo	2010s	Metal	Jul 28, 2011	No
"Category I: Slave to the Empirical (2x Bass Pedal)"	Ethereal Collapse	2000s	Metal	Jul 28, 2011	No
"Heroes Don't Cry"	Free Spirit	2000s	Rock	Jul 28, 2011	Oct 4, 2011
"Honeys Takin' Money"	Audio Ammunition	2000s	Hip-Hop/Rap	Jul 28, 2011	No
"I"	Before Nine	2010s	Rock	Jul 28, 2011	Jul 3, 2012
"If I Was King"	Dan Markland	2000s	Alternative	Jul 28, 2011	No
"Inheritors (2x Bass Pedal)"	Serianna	2010s	Metal	Jul 28, 2011	No
"Megalodon (2x Bass Pedal)"	Mastodon	2000s	Metal	Jul 28, 2011	No
"Now or Never"	Stagehands	2000s	Pop-Rock	Jul 28, 2011	Jan 24, 2012
"On and On"	Fallen Angel	2010s	Metal	Jul 28, 2011	No
"Pendulum (2x Bass Pedal)"	After the Burial	2010s	Metal	Jul 28, 2011	No
"Piano Sonata No. 14 - Moonlight Sonata (Beethoven)"	Thomas Walker	2010s	Classical	Jul 28, 2011	Oct 18, 2011
"Pirats 'Til We Die"	Halfbrick Studios	2010s	Metal	Jul 28, 2011	Jan 17, 2012
"Poor Yorick (2x Bass Pedal)"	Shakespeare in Hell	2000s	Metal	Jul 28, 2011	No
"Very Busy People"	The Limousines	2010s	Pop/Dance/Electronic	Jul 28, 2011	Oct 25, 2011
"Walks Like A Ghost"	Quartered	2010s	Rock	Jul 28, 2011	Nov 22, 2011
"!I"	!I!	2010s	Other	Jul 28, 2011	No
"American Hero vs. Done"	Robin Skouteris	2010s	Rock	Aug 4, 2011	No
"Cluster #2"	Askari Nari	2010s	Pop/Dance/Electronic	Aug 4, 2011	No
"Dawn (Blood Saga I)/Through the Maelström"	Morgawr	2010s	Metal	Aug 4, 2011	No
"Desecration Day (2x Bass Pedal)"	Halcyon Way	2010s	Metal	Aug 4, 2011	No
"Devil's Boulevard"	Eminence	2000s	Metal	Aug 4, 2011	No
"Gymnopédie No. 1 (Satie)"	Thomas Walker	2010s	Classical	Aug 4, 2011	Oct 25, 2011
"Moonlight Ride"	Free Spirit	2000s	Rock	Aug 4, 2011	Oct 25, 2011
"PON DE FIOR"	SNMT	2010s	Other	Aug 4, 2011	No
"Poor Yorick"	Shakespeare in Hell	2000s	Metal	Aug 4, 2011	No
"Reviving a Dead Language"	Askari Nari	2010s	Pop/Dance/Electronic	Aug 4, 2011	No
"Shadow of a Man"	Free Spirit	2000s	Rock	Aug 4, 2011	Oct 18, 2011
"The Cheval Glass"	Emery	2010s	Rock	Aug 4, 2011	Oct 18, 2011
"Toast (Live)"	Heywood Banks	1990s	Novelty	Aug 4, 2011	Nov 1, 2011
"Wha-Chow Theme (Feat. ShadyVox)"	Psyguy	2010s	Novelty	Aug 4, 2011	No
"Act of War"	Lich King	2010s	Metal	Aug 11, 2011	Dec 4, 2012
"Ashes to Ashes / Leaving It All Behind"	Fallen Angel	2010s	Metal	Aug 11, 2011	No
"Caraphernelia"	Pierce the Veil	2010s	Alternative	Aug 18, 2011	Oct 25, 2011
"Dance Battle Alpha"	Active Knowledge	2010s	Pop/Dance/Electronic	Aug 18, 2011	No
"Doppelgänger"	Freezepop	2010s	New Wave	Aug 18, 2011	Oct 11, 2011
"Dystopia"	Chaotrope	2010s	Metal	Aug 18, 2011	Mar 27, 2012
"Far Away from Heaven (RB3 version)"	Free Spirit	2000s	Rock	Aug 18, 2011	Mar 20, 2012
"Gold Rush"	Armor For The Broken	2010s	Metal	Aug 18, 2011	No
"Life Will Fade Away"	Synthetic Elements	2000s	Punk	Aug 18, 2011	No
"Make It Last"	Devoutcast	2010s	Rock	Aug 18, 2011	No
"Nugget Man"	Paul and Storm	2000s	Novelty	Aug 18, 2011	Oct 18, 2011
"Pale Sister of Light (RB3 version)"	Free Spirit	2000s	Rock	Aug 18, 2011	Nov 22, 2011
"Soy Bomb"	Honest Bob and the Factory-to-Dealer Incentives	2000s	Rock	Aug 18, 2011	Oct 11, 2011
"Stabbing to Purge Dissimulation"	All Shall Perish	2000s	Metal	Aug 18, 2011	Jun 12, 2012
"Sweet Rain"	Weeping Buddhas	2010s	Pop-Rock	Aug 18, 2011	Dec 18, 2012
"The Space for This"	Cynic	2000s	Metal	Aug 18, 2011	Oct 11, 2011
"The Space for This (2x Bass Pedal)"	Cynic	2000s	Metal	Aug 18, 2011	Oct 11, 2011
"The Thief in the Night - Part I (2x Bass Pedal)"	Chaotrope	2010s	Metal	Aug 18, 2011	No
"Your Troubles Will Cease and Fortune Will Smile Upon You"	After the Burial	2010s	Metal	Aug 18, 2011	Oct 11, 2011
"Your Troubles Will Cease and Fortune Will Smile Upon You (2x Bass Pedal)"	After the Burial	2010s	Metal	Aug 18, 2011	Oct 11, 2011
"Flight of the Bumblebee (Rimsky-Korsakov - Piano Version)"	Thomas Walker	2010s	Classical	Aug 25, 2011	Nov 15, 2011
"Glamour Life"	IDLEMINE	2000s	Hip-Hop/Rap	Aug 25, 2011	No
"Hyperdrive"	Devin Townsend	2000s	Metal	Aug 25, 2011	Mar 6, 2012
"Madness"	Myrath	2010s	Prog	Aug 25, 2011	Nov 1, 2011
"Magnolia"	Terrorhorse	2010s	Metal	Aug 25, 2011	No
"Magnolia (2x Bass Pedal)"	Terrorhorse	2010s	Metal	Aug 25, 2011	No
"Making Love (To a Foreign Woman While Reading Time Magazine)"	Blue Water Dance	2010s	Metal	Aug 25, 2011	No
"My Frailty"	After the Burial	2010s	Metal	Aug 25, 2011	Feb 21, 2012
"Rock Me Roxy"	Haunted By Heroes	2010s	Rock	Aug 25, 2011	No
"Scissors"	Emery	2010s	Rock	Aug 25, 2011	Nov 1, 2011
"Stand for Something (RB3 version)"	Skindred	2000s	Metal	Aug 25, 2011	No
"War in Heaven"	Amberian Dawn	2010s	Metal	Aug 25, 2011	Aug 21, 2012
"Young Love"	Oh Darling	2010s	Pop-Rock	Aug 25, 2011	No
"Anubis"	Septicflesh	2000s	Metal	Sep 1, 2011	Jun 26, 2012
"Anubis (2x Bass Pedal)"	Septicflesh	2000s	Metal	Sep 1, 2011	No
"Bombshell From Hell"	Scum of the Earth	2000s	Metal	Sep 1, 2011	No
"Conquer Me"	Damone	2000s	Rock	Sep 1, 2011	Nov 29, 2011
"Devil's Boulevard (2x Bass Pedal)"	Eminence	2000s	Metal	Sep 1, 2011	No
"England Rock Anthems"	Richard Campbell	2010s	Prog	Sep 1, 2011	Nov 8, 2011
"Fading Sacrifice"	Chaotrope	2010s	Metal	Sep 1, 2011	Oct 30, 2012
"Fuzzy Man (Fuzzy Nation)"	Paul and Storm	2010s	Pop-Rock	Sep 1, 2011	Nov 22, 2011
"Genuine Penguin"	Askari Nari	2010s	Pop/Dance/Electronic	Sep 1, 2011	No
"Give"	One Day	2010s	Alternative	Sep 1, 2011	No
"Hitman Blues"	The Blue News	2010s	Blues	Sep 1, 2011	Nov 15, 2011
"Slit"	Without Mercy	2000s	Metal	Sep 1, 2011	No
"So Let Us Create"	Jukebox the Ghost	2010s	Pop-Rock	Sep 1, 2011	Feb 14, 2012
"Spineless"	All Shall Perish	2010s	Metal	Sep 1, 2011	Jun 12, 2012
"Stabbing to Purge Dissimulation (2x Bass Pedal)"	All Shall Perish	2000s	Metal	Sep 1, 2011	No
"The Age of Betrayal"	Halcyon Way	2010s	Metal	Sep 1, 2011	Jan 8, 2013
"The Age of Betrayal (2x Bass Pedal)"	Halcyon Way	2010s	Metal	Sep 1, 2011	No
"Victor(ia)"	Conflicted	2010s	Metal	Sep 1, 2011	No
"Wake Up Fall"	All City Elite	2010s	Pop/Dance/Electronic	Sep 1, 2011	No
"War in Heaven (2x Bass Pedal)"	Amberian Dawn	2010s	Metal	Sep 1, 2011	No
"A Prophecy (RB3 version)"	Asking Alexandria	2000s	Metal	Sep 8, 2011	Jan 10, 2012
"Estranger"	Vangough	2010s	Prog	Sep 8, 2011	Jan 17, 2012
"Forbidden City"	Tina Guo	2010s	Metal	Sep 8, 2011	Jan 8, 2013
"Funeral on Parade"	Mafia Track Suit	2010s	Alternative	Sep 8, 2011	No
"He's Our Savior"	DJ Raptorz	2010s	Other	Sep 8, 2011	No
"He's Our Savior (2x Bass Pedal)"	DJ Raptorz	2010s	Other	Sep 8, 2011	No
"OH-KAY!"	Jutbox	2000s	Hip-Hop/Rap	Sep 8, 2011	No
"Ramp Truck (RB3 version)"	Freen in Green	2010s	Prog	Sep 8, 2011	No
"Space Unicorn"	Parry Gripp	2010s	Novelty	Sep 8, 2011	Dec 6, 2011
"Stellar Crash"	Hedras Ramos	2010s	Metal	Sep 8, 2011	No
"A Sickness You Like"	Yesternight's Decision	2010s	Rock	Sep 15, 2011	No
"Any Other Heart"	Go Radio	2010s	Pop-Rock	Sep 15, 2011	Jan 17, 2012
"Courage"	Alien Ant Farm	2000s	Rock	Sep 15, 2011	Dec 20, 2011
"Dig Your Grave"	Kamikaze	2010s	Punk	Sep 15, 2011	No
"Downhill"	Rishloo	2000s	Prog	Sep 15, 2011	Nov 15, 2011
"Hey"	Honest Bob and the Factory-to-Dealer Incentives	2000s	Indie Rock	Sep 15, 2011	Nov 15, 2011
"In Division"	Underoath	2010s	Metal	Sep 15, 2011	Nov 29, 2011
"Into the Black Light"	Ghost Brigade	2000s	Metal	Sep 15, 2011	Oct 9, 2012
"Just a Game"	The Blue News	2010s	Blues	Sep 15, 2011	Jan 10, 2012
"Nemesis"	Arch Enemy	2000s	Metal	Sep 15, 2011	Nov 22, 2011
"Reaching Down"	Order of Voices	2010s	Prog	Sep 15, 2011	Feb 19, 2013
"A Bridge That Will Burn"	Moving Picture Show	2000s	Pop-Rock	Sep 22, 2011	Jan 15, 2013
"A Family Affair"	Verah Falls	2010s	Metal	Sep 22, 2011	No
"Children Surrender"	Black Veil Brides	2010s	Metal	Sep 22, 2011	Nov 8, 2011
"Constellation"	The Story Changes	2000s	Punk	Sep 22, 2011	No
"Diana Don't Slow Down"	Gary Dean Smith	2010s	Country	Sep 22, 2011	No
"Echo"	Dance for the Dying	2010s	Pop-Rock	Sep 22, 2011	Dec 20, 2011
"End of My Rope"	Spinning Chain	2010s	Rock	Sep 22, 2011	Sep 18, 2012
"Fair Weather Friend"	Gary Dean Smith	2010s	R&B/Soul/Funk	Sep 22, 2011	No
"Fire Death and Fear"	Rotting Christ	2000s	Metal	Sep 22, 2011	No
"Heaven's Calling"	Black Veil Brides	2010s	Metal	Sep 22, 2011	Nov 15, 2011
"Mouth Without a Head"	Halcyon Way	2010s	Metal	Sep 22, 2011	Jul 10, 2012
"Perfect Weapon"	Black Veil Brides	2010s	Metal	Sep 22, 2011	Nov 8, 2011
"Remember"	Jenium	2000s	Indie Rock	Sep 22, 2011	No
"Solar Winds"	Devin Townsend	2000s	Metal	Sep 22, 2011	Oct 16, 2012
"4 Walls, 1 Window"	Finespun	2010s	Rock	Sep 29, 2011	No
"Examination"	I Am Abomination	2010s	Metal	Sep 29, 2011	Jun 5, 2012
"Examination (2x Bass Pedal)"	I Am Abomination	2010s	Metal	Sep 29, 2011	No
"Fire Death and Fear (2x Bass Pedal)"	Rotting Christ	2000s	Metal	Sep 29, 2011	No
"If You Can't Hang"	Sleeping with Sirens	2010s	Emo	Sep 29, 2011	Nov 29, 2011
"Mouth Without a Head (2x Bass Pedal)"	Halcyon Way	2010s	Metal	Sep 29, 2011	No
"Never... Again"	All Shall Perish	2000s	Metal	Sep 29, 2011	May 1, 2012
"Pain I Feel"	Spinning Chain	2010s	Rock	Sep 29, 2011	Sep 18, 2012
"Pray for Plagues (2x Bass Pedal)"	Bring Me the Horizon	2000s	Metal	Sep 29, 2011	No
"Scarred"	Chaotrope	2010s	Metal	Sep 29, 2011	Oct 16, 2012
"Solar Winds (2x Bass Pedal)"	Devin Townsend	2000s	Metal	Sep 29, 2011	No
"Surface"	Imperative Reaction	2010s	Pop/Dance/Electronic	Sep 29, 2011	Jun 26, 2012
"The Elevator"	I Am Empire	2010s	Rock	Sep 29, 2011	Dec 6, 2011
"The Entertainer (Joplin)"	Thomas Walker	2010s	Classical	Sep 29, 2011	Dec 6, 2011
"Until the Night (RB3 version)"	Free Spirit	2000s	Rock	Sep 29, 2011	Nov 29, 2011
"White Shoes"	Bright Midnight	2010s	Rock	Sep 29, 2011	No
"Cody"	We Set The Sun	2010s	Metal	Oct 6, 2011	Jan 8, 2013
"Last Breath"	Attack Attack!	2010s	Metal	Oct 6, 2011	Dec 6, 2011
"Last Breath (2x Bass Pedal)"	Attack Attack!	2010s	Metal	Oct 6, 2011	Apr 2, 2013
"Run Away With Me"	Daryle Stephen Ackerman	2000s	Pop-Rock	Oct 6, 2011	No
"Wicked N' Wild"	IDLEMINE	2000s	Hip-Hop/Rap	Oct 6, 2011	No
"Winter Water Waves"	Denullification	2010s	New Wave	Oct 6, 2011	No
"All Signs Point to Lauderdale"	A Day to Remember	2010s	Rock	Oct 13, 2011	Dec 6, 2011
"All Signs Point to Lauderdale (2x Bass Pedal)"	A Day to Remember	2010s	Rock	Oct 13, 2011	Apr 2, 2013
"Category II: Discovering the Absolute"	Ethereal Collapse	2000s	Metal	Oct 13, 2011	No
"Category II: Discovering the Absolute (2x Bass Pedal)"	Ethereal Collapse	2000s	Metal	Oct 13, 2011	No
"Cry of an Eagle"	Free Spirit	2000s	Rock	Oct 13, 2011	Dec 20, 2011
"Dark Escape"	Shylo Elliott	2010s	Prog	Oct 13, 2011	No
"Indulgence"	Tokyo Raid	2010s	Rock	Oct 13, 2011	No
"Internal Cannon"	August Burns Red	2010s	Metal	Oct 13, 2011	Dec 13, 2011
"Internal Cannon (2x Bass Pedal)"	August Burns Red	2010s	Metal	Oct 13, 2011	Apr 2, 2013
"Movies"	Alien Ant Farm	2000s	Rock	Oct 13, 2011	Dec 13, 2011
"Reaping Tide"	Mile Marker Zero	2000s	Prog	Oct 13, 2011	Jan 22, 2013
"Say"	The Asbestos	2010s	Rock	Oct 13, 2011	May 1, 2012
"The Carrion Call"	Misery Index	2010s	Metal	Oct 13, 2011	No
"Coelacanths"	Coelacanths	2010s	Other	Oct 20, 2011	No
"Crazy Idea"	Goliath Down	2010s	Inspirational	Oct 20, 2011	No
"Easy Days"	Free Spirit	2000s	Rock	Oct 20, 2011	Jan 10, 2012
"For God or Country"	Single White Infidel	2010s	Punk	Oct 20, 2011	No
"Grocery Party"	Freen in Green	2010s	Novelty	Oct 20, 2011	No
"He Is Good"	Denbigh Cherry	2010s	Inspirational	Oct 20, 2011	No
"Heat Seeking Ghost of Sex"	Dance Gavin Dance	2010s	Metal	Oct 20, 2011	Dec 13, 2011
"Looking (Foot in Your Mouth)"	Analogue Revolution feat. The Chance Sisters	2000s	Pop-Rock	Oct 20, 2011	No
"My God Is There Controlling"	Denbigh Cherry	2010s	Inspirational	Oct 20, 2011	No
"Never... Again (2x Bass Pedal)"	All Shall Perish	2000s	Metal	Oct 20, 2011	No
"Of Dirt You Were Made..."	Brad Gerke	2010s	Alternative	Oct 20, 2011	No
"Paced Energy"	Magnus 'SoulEye' Pålsson	2000s	Pop/Dance/Electronic	Oct 20, 2011	Mar 20, 2012
"The End of Progress"	Mystakin	2010s	Prog	Oct 20, 2011	Jan 3, 2012
"2nd Sucks"	A Day to Remember	2010s	Rock	Oct 27, 2011	Dec 13, 2011
"2nd Sucks (2x Bass Pedal)"	A Day to Remember	2010s	Rock	Oct 27, 2011	Apr 2, 2013
"Blood Red Rose"	The Boyscout feat. Amanda Somerville	2010s	Pop-Rock	Oct 27, 2011	No
"CMDUC"	Without Mercy	2000s	Metal	Oct 27, 2011	No
"Death of a Dream"	Halcyon Way	2010s	Metal	Oct 27, 2011	Jul 10, 2012
"Galactic Love"	New Nobility	2000s	Rock	Oct 27, 2011	No
"If It Means a Lot to You"	A Day to Remember	2000s	Rock	Oct 27, 2011	Dec 13, 2011
"My Name's Horatio, You Got Me, You Ain't Got Nobody Else, So Deal With It, And Love It"	Mega64	2010s	Novelty	Oct 27, 2011	No
"Never Again"	The Bloody Five	2010s	Grunge	Oct 27, 2011	No
"Reality Down"	Active Knowledge	2010s	Pop/Dance/Electronic	Oct 27, 2011	No
"Selkies: The Endless Obsession"	Between the Buried and Me	2000s	Metal	Oct 27, 2011	Dec 20, 2011
"Selkies: The Endless Obsession (2x Bass Pedal)"	Between the Buried and Me	2000s	Metal	Oct 27, 2011	No
"Show Me What You've Got"	Powerman 5000	2000s	Nu-Metal	Oct 27, 2011	Dec 20, 2011
"Sisters"	JOANovARC	2010s	Pop-Rock	Oct 27, 2011	No
"Sweet Canadian Mullet"	Glenn Case	2000s	Rock	Oct 27, 2011	No
"The Monster Stroll"	Jocko of Sha Na Na	2000s	Rock	Oct 27, 2011	Oct 30, 2012
"-20% for Being a Loser"	We Are Knuckle Dragger	2010s	Metal	Nov 3, 2011	No
"Battle"	Christina Marie Magenta	2010s	Pop/Dance/Electronic	Nov 3, 2011	No
"Church of No Return"	Christian Death	1980s	Glam	Nov 3, 2011	No
"Do the Donkey Kong"	Buckner & Garcia	1990s	Pop-Rock	Nov 3, 2011	Apr 3, 2012
"Embrace the Curse"	All Shall Perish	2010s	Metal	Nov 3, 2011	No
"Flags"	Christina Marie Magenta	2010s	Pop/Dance/Electronic	Nov 3, 2011	No
"Found Me the Bomb"	Buckner & Garcia	2010s	Blues	Nov 3, 2011	Jan 3, 2012
"Goin' Berzerk"	Buckner & Garcia	1990s	Pop-Rock	Nov 3, 2011	No
"Hold Me In Your Arms"	The Trews	2000s	Rock	Nov 3, 2011	Jan 10, 2012
"Lunatic"	Christina Marie Magenta	2010s	Pop/Dance/Electronic	Nov 3, 2011	No
"Melted Picks & Broken Sticks"	Savage Minotaur	2000s	Metal	Nov 3, 2011	No
"Ode to a Centipede"	Buckner & Garcia	1990s	Pop-Rock	Nov 3, 2011	Oct 23, 2012
"The Defender"	Buckner & Garcia	1990s	Pop-Rock	Nov 3, 2011	No
"Boy"	Ra Ra Riot	2010s	Indie Rock	Nov 10, 2011	Jan 3, 2012
"Can You Tell"	Ra Ra Riot	2000s	Indie Rock	Nov 10, 2011	Jan 3, 2012
"Estranger (2x Bass Pedal)"	Vangough	2010s	Prog	Nov 10, 2011	No
"Faux King Christ"	Atheist	2010s	Metal	Nov 10, 2011	No
"Faux King Christ (2x Bass Pedal)"	Atheist	2010s	Metal	Nov 10, 2011	No
"Frankenstein Teaser Trailer"	Richard Campbell	2010s	Prog	Nov 10, 2011	Jan 3, 2012
"Haunting the Dead"	Lockdown	2010s	Pop/Dance/Electronic	Nov 10, 2011	No
"Heavy Weather - The Storm ov The Undead"	Rainbowdragoneyes	2010s	Pop/Dance/Electronic	Nov 10, 2011	Feb 7, 2012
"Heavy Weather - The Storm ov The Undead (2x Bass Pedal)"	Rainbowdragoneyes	2010s	Pop/Dance/Electronic	Nov 10, 2011	No
"Inversion"	Halcyon Way	2010s	Metal	Nov 10, 2011	Jan 8, 2013
"Let It Ride"	Spinning Chain	2010s	Rock	Nov 10, 2011	No
"Life or Death"	Fallen Angel	2010s	Metal	Nov 10, 2011	No
"Spineless (2x Bass Pedal)"	All Shall Perish	2010s	Metal	Nov 10, 2011	No
"The Answer"	Fallen Angel	2010s	Metal	Nov 10, 2011	No
"The Cascade Effect"	Chaotrope	2010s	Metal	Nov 10, 2011	Mar 20, 2012
"The Consequences"	Mystakin	2010s	Prog	Nov 10, 2011	Nov 20, 2012
"The Fractal Reason"	Active Knowledge	2010s	Pop/Dance/Electronic	Nov 10, 2011	Feb 19, 2013
"Apology Rejected"	These Hearts	2010s	Rock	Nov 17, 2011	Jun 5, 2012
"Cross and Crows"	The Asbestos	2010s	Rock	Nov 17, 2011	No
"Death of a Dream (2x Bass Pedal)"	Halcyon Way	2010s	Metal	Nov 17, 2011	No
"El Monstro"	Dance for the Dying	2010s	Pop-Rock	Nov 17, 2011	Jan 31, 2012
"Embrace the Curse (2x Bass Pedal)"	All Shall Perish	2010s	Metal	Nov 17, 2011	No
"Forget"	Christina Marie Magenta	2010s	Pop/Dance/Electronic	Nov 17, 2011	No
"Harmony of the Spheres"	Jake Dreyer	2010s	Metal	Nov 17, 2011	No
"Haunting the Dead (2x Bass Pedal)"	Lockdown	2010s	Pop/Dance/Electronic	Nov 17, 2011	No
"Strangers"	Free Spirit	2000s	Rock	Nov 17, 2011	Jan 24, 2012
"The Way It Ends"	Prototype	2000s	Metal	Nov 17, 2011	Jan 3, 2012
"Undercover"	Anita Maj	2010s	Pop-Rock	Nov 17, 2011	No
"Inversion (2x Bass Pedal)"	Halcyon Way	2010s	Metal	Nov 23, 2011	No
"Traffic Jam"	Lino Gonzalez	2000s	Rock	Nov 23, 2011	No
"Trenches"	The Haunted	2000s	Metal	Nov 23, 2011	Dec 11, 2012
"A Tadg30 Song"	Askari Nari	2010s	Metal	Dec 1, 2011	No
"Bigger than Kiss"	Teenage Bottlerocket	2010s	Punk	Dec 1, 2011	Mar 27, 2012
"Break Free from Your Life"	Design the Skyline	2010s	Metal	Dec 1, 2011	Oct 23, 2012
"Break Me"	The Irresponsibles	2010s	Rock	Dec 1, 2011	Mar 27, 2012
"Can o' Salt (Remix)"	dB Soundworks	2010s	Pop/Dance/Electronic	Dec 1, 2011	Feb 28, 2012
"Horizon"	Thunder and Lightning	2010s	Metal	Dec 1, 2011	No
"It's Sno, Baby - Not Sugar"	Snovonne	2010s	Rock	Dec 1, 2011	No
"My Retaliation"	All Shall Perish	2010s	Metal	Dec 1, 2011	No
"Ocean Floor"	The Bunny the Bear	2010s	Metal	Dec 1, 2011	May 15, 2012
"Over and Out"	Cancer	2000s	Rock	Dec 1, 2011	No
"Preacher Man"	Free Spirit	2000s	Rock	Dec 1, 2011	Mar 20, 2012
"Pretty Boy"	The Irresponsibles	2010s	Rock	Dec 1, 2011	No
"Proto-Lupus"	Wolfblur	2010s	Pop/Dance/Electronic	Dec 1, 2011	No
"Starlight Speedway"	Rocket Ship Resort	2010s	Pop/Dance/Electronic	Dec 1, 2011	Apr 3, 2012
"The Man's Masterpiece"	BioShaft	2010s	Rock	Dec 1, 2011	No
"The Reapers Shall Gather / Arrival"	Fallen Angel	2010s	Metal	Dec 1, 2011	No
"Tired Climb"	Kylesa	2010s	Metal	Dec 1, 2011	No
"Without Morals"	Nevermore	2010s	Metal	Dec 1, 2011	Jan 24, 2012
"Cheesy Pop Song"	A Talking Fish	2010s	Novelty	Dec 8, 2011	May 1, 2012
"Cold"	Christina Marie Magenta	2010s	Pop/Dance/Electronic	Dec 8, 2011	Jan 8, 2013
"Hysteria"	Aiden	2010s	Rock	Dec 8, 2011	Jan 31, 2012
"If We Only Saw Sepia"	The Fenton Project	2010s	Prog	Dec 8, 2011	No
"Last Hope"	A Call To Remain	2010s	Alternative	Dec 8, 2011	No
"Little Sister"	Ultra Saturday	2010s	Punk	Dec 8, 2011	No
"March Into Hell / Blood on My Soul"	Fallen Angel	2010s	Metal	Dec 8, 2011	No
"Martyr to Science"	Deadlock	2000s	Metal	Dec 8, 2011	May 29, 2012
"Mida's Secret"	Will Haven	2010s	Metal	Dec 8, 2011	No
"No More Excuses"	Kill the Alarm	2000s	Alternative	Dec 8, 2011	Mar 27, 2012
"Ocaso Escarlata"	Nod 206	2010s	Rock	Dec 8, 2011	No
"Potential for Anything"	Magnus 'SoulEye' Pålsson	2010s	Pop/Dance/Electronic	Dec 8, 2011	Feb 14, 2012
"Rage and Pain"	Francisco Meza	2000s	Metal	Dec 8, 2011	Jan 22, 2013
"Respiration Desperation / The Neutral Zone"	Fallen Angel	2010s	Metal	Dec 8, 2011	No
"The Grinder's Tale"	Wrong Side of Dawn	2010s	Alternative	Dec 8, 2011	Mar 6, 2012
"The Obsidian Conspiracy"	Nevermore	2010s	Metal	Dec 8, 2011	Sep 11, 2012
"The Obsidian Conspiracy (2x Bass Pedal)"	Nevermore	2010s	Metal	Dec 8, 2011	No
"The Way It Ends (2x Bass Pedal)"	Prototype	2000s	Metal	Dec 8, 2011	No
"Victim"	The Bitter Roots	2010s	Rock	Dec 8, 2011	No
"Without Morals (2x Bass Pedal)"	Nevermore	2010s	Metal	Dec 8, 2011	No
"A Pure Evil"	All Shall Perish	2010s	Metal	Dec 15, 2011	Sep 18, 2012
"All I Want Is You"	Jerry Naylor	2010s	Rock	Dec 15, 2011	Feb 14, 2012
"Category III: Architect"	Ethereal Collapse	2000s	Metal	Dec 15, 2011	No
"Category III: Architect (2x Bass Pedal)"	Ethereal Collapse	2000s	Metal	Dec 15, 2011	No
"Dark Beat"	The Black Beverly Heels	2010s	Rock	Dec 15, 2011	No
"Death In General"	Gigakoops	2010s	Pop/Dance/Electronic	Dec 15, 2011	No
"Don't Ever Change"	Jerry Naylor	2010s	Rock	Dec 15, 2011	Aug 21, 2012
"Go"	Kari Kimmel	2010s	Pop-Rock	Dec 15, 2011	Feb 5, 2013
"Hey There Mr. Brooks (RB3 version)"	Asking Alexandria	2000s	Metal	Dec 15, 2011	Jul 3, 2012
"Icon of Resolution"	Halcyon Way	2010s	Metal	Dec 15, 2011	No
"Icon of Resolution (2x Bass Pedal)"	Halcyon Way	2010s	Metal	Dec 15, 2011	No
"In Between"	Silent House	2010s	Indie Rock	Dec 15, 2011	No
"Lethean Tears"	Solution .45	2010s	Prog	Dec 15, 2011	Feb 21, 2012
"Love's the Profit"	Mike Kotulka	2000s	Rock	Dec 15, 2011	No
"Mil Rosas"	Niño Burbuja	2010s	Indie Rock	Dec 15, 2011	No
"My Retaliation (2x Bass Pedal)"	All Shall Perish	2010s	Metal	Dec 15, 2011	No
"N9"	Devin Townsend	2000s	Metal	Dec 15, 2011	Nov 6, 2012
"Rage and Pain (2x Bass Pedal)"	Francisco Meza	2000s	Metal	Dec 15, 2011	No
"Real Wild Child"	Jerry Naylor	2010s	Rock	Dec 15, 2011	Feb 7, 2012
"Sad Wings"	Fallen Angel	2010s	Metal	Dec 15, 2011	No
"Tear It Up"	Jerry Naylor	2010s	Rock	Dec 15, 2011	Apr 3, 2012
"The Epic, Part 3.7 (RBN Remix)"	Bankai	2010s	Pop/Dance/Electronic	Dec 15, 2011	Feb 21, 2012
"Underneath the Cenotaph"	Watain	2000s	Metal	Dec 15, 2011	No
"V is for Vampire"	Powerman 5000	2000s	Nu-Metal	Dec 15, 2011	Feb 21, 2012
"Bullet"	Drugstore Fanatics	2000s	Alternative	Dec 22, 2011	Feb 28, 2012
"Darkness"	Fallen Angel	2010s	Metal	Dec 22, 2011	No
"Hatas (Rock Band Mix)"	LEL Brothas	2010s	Hip-Hop/Rap	Dec 22, 2011	No
"Hook, Line, and Sinner (RB3 version)"	Texas in July	2000s	Metal	Dec 22, 2011	No
"N9 (2x Bass Pedal)"	Devin Townsend	2000s	Metal	Dec 22, 2011	No
"Nevermore"	Morbid Angel	2010s	Metal	Dec 22, 2011	No
"Nevermore (2x Bass Pedal)"	Morbid Angel	2010s	Metal	Dec 22, 2011	No
"Ready, Set, Stop"	Vanattica	2010s	Alternative	Dec 22, 2011	No
"Red Crayon"	Christina Marie Magenta	2010s	Pop/Dance/Electronic	Dec 22, 2011	No
"Still Alive"	Jonathan Coulton ft. Sara Quin	2010s	Rock	Dec 22, 2011	Feb 21, 2012
"The Final Hour"	Those Among Us	2010s	New Wave	Dec 22, 2011	No
"The Massacre (Rock Band Mix)"	FantomenK	2010s	Pop/Dance/Electronic	Dec 22, 2011	Mar 27, 2012
"These Voices"	Deception of a Ghost	2010s	Metal	Dec 22, 2011	Jan 8, 2013
"(I Want to Go to) Space"	A Talking Fish	2010s	Novelty	Jan 5, 2012	No
"Beer, Metal, Trolls and Vomit!"	Nordheim	2010s	Metal	Jan 5, 2012	May 15, 2012
"Burn"	Christina Marie Magenta	2010s	Pop/Dance/Electronic	Jan 5, 2012	No
"Culling the Weak"	Broken Equilibrium	2010s	Rock	Jan 5, 2012	No
"Culling the Weak (2x Bass Pedal)"	Broken Equilibrium	2010s	Rock	Jan 5, 2012	No
"Diamond Eyes"	Rishloo	2000s	Prog	Jan 5, 2012	Feb 28, 2012
"Eternity Below"	Quartered	2010s	Rock	Jan 5, 2012	Mar 13, 2012
"Hook, Line, and Sinner (RB3 2x Bass Pedal)"	Texas in July	2000s	Metal	Jan 5, 2012	No
"Just a Lie"	Pythia	2010s	Metal	Jan 5, 2012	Jan 8, 2013
"Just a Lie (2x Bass Pedal)"	Pythia	2010s	Metal	Jan 5, 2012	No
"Lethean Tears (2x Bass Pedal)"	Solution .45	2010s	Prog	Jan 5, 2012	No
"Planet Smasher"	Devin Townsend	2000s	Metal	Jan 5, 2012	Nov 6, 2012
"The One Who Walks Alone"	Fallen Angel	2010s	Metal	Jan 5, 2012	No
"Beer, Metal, Trolls and Vomit! (2x Bass Pedal)"	Nordheim	2010s	Metal	Jan 12, 2012	No
"BRODYQUEST"	Lemon Demon	2010s	Novelty	Jan 12, 2012	Mar 6, 2012
"Clawmaster"	Ghost Brigade	2010s	Metal	Jan 12, 2012	Oct 9, 2012
"Console War"	DRUOX	2010s	Metal	Jan 12, 2012	No
"Console War (2x Bass Pedal)"	DRUOX	2010s	Metal	Jan 12, 2012	No
"Elysian"	Chaotrope	2010s	Metal	Jan 12, 2012	No
"Entropy/Extropy"	Chaotrope	2010s	Metal	Jan 12, 2012	Nov 20, 2012
"Existo Vulgoré"	Morbid Angel	2010s	Metal	Jan 12, 2012	No
"Fairweather Stranger"	Mafia Track Suit	2010s	Alternative	Jan 12, 2012	No
"Inside"	Cold Steel	2000s	Rock	Jan 12, 2012	Jun 12, 2012
"Keyhole in the Sky"	Rishloo	2000s	Prog	Jan 12, 2012	Apr 24, 2012
"Martyr to Science (2x Bass Pedal)"	Deadlock	2000s	Metal	Jan 12, 2012	No
"Mountains of Maths"	Ultra Vomit	2000s	Metal	Jan 12, 2012	No
"Mow"	Miss Crazy	2000s	Rock	Jan 12, 2012	No
"Superjet"	Raggedy Angry	2010s	Pop/Dance/Electronic	Jan 12, 2012	No
"The Carrion Call (2x Bass Pedal)"	Misery Index	2010s	Metal	Jan 12, 2012	No
"The Hourglass Paroxysm - Part I"	Chaotrope	2010s	Metal	Jan 12, 2012	Jan 8, 2013
"Too Little Too Late"	Pan.a.ce.a	2000s	Rock	Jan 12, 2012	No
"Touch the Mic"	The Break Down	2000s	Hip-Hop/Rap	Jan 12, 2012	No
"All In My Head"	The Last Nova	2010s	Rock	Jan 19, 2012	No
"BEER!!"	Psychostick	2000s	Metal	Jan 19, 2012	Feb 28, 2012
"Don't Eye Me Like a Child"	Bright Midnight	2010s	Rock	Jan 19, 2012	No
"Dos Impar"	Channel	2010s	Indie Rock	Jan 19, 2012	No
"Existo Vulgoré (2x Bass Pedal)"	Morbid Angel	2010s	Metal	Jan 19, 2012	No
"Gordon Freeman Saved My Life"	Miracle of Sound	2010s	Pop-Rock	Jan 19, 2012	Apr 24, 2012
"Gravitational Lensing"	Solution .45	2010s	Metal	Jan 19, 2012	Mar 20, 2012
"Heart Of A Child"	A Plea for Purging	2010s	Metal	Jan 19, 2012	Feb 26, 2013
"Heartless"	Pythia	2010s	Metal	Jan 19, 2012	Mar 13, 2012
"Heartless (2x Bass Pedal)"	Pythia	2010s	Metal	Jan 19, 2012	No
"Indiscriminate Murder is Counter-Productive"	Machinae Supremacy	2010s	Metal	Jan 19, 2012	Apr 3, 2012
"Inside Looking Out (The Icon & the Ghost)"	Halcyon Way	2010s	Metal	Jan 19, 2012	No
"Lights, Camera and Action"	The Asbestos	2010s	Rock	Jan 19, 2012	No
"M.O.N.O.S"	Los Noelia	2010s	Rock	Jan 19, 2012	No
"Melodicus Counterpointus"	Coldera	2010s	Metal	Jan 19, 2012	No
"Night"	Gigakoops	2010s	Pop/Dance/Electronic	Jan 19, 2012	No
"Nightfall"	Silent House	2010s	Indie Rock	Jan 19, 2012	No
"Planet Smasher (2x Bass Pedal)"	Devin Townsend	2000s	Metal	Jan 19, 2012	No
"Pray for You"	Jaron and the Long Road to Love	2010s	Country	Jan 19, 2012	Mar 13, 2012
"Radio World"	IDLEMINE	2000s	Rock	Jan 19, 2012	No
"Shipwrecked"	Alestorm	2010s	Metal	Jan 19, 2012	Mar 6, 2012
"The Stache"	Jonathan Coulton	2010s	Rock	Jan 19, 2012	Apr 10, 2012
"The System"	Halcyon Way	2010s	Metal	Jan 19, 2012	No
"Twenty One"	Oh My!	2010s	Indie Rock	Jan 19, 2012	No
"Building the Towers"	Halcyon Way	2010s	Metal	Jan 26, 2012	No
"Flesh and Blood"	Edge	2000s	Alternative	Jan 26, 2012	Sep 25, 2012
"Generic Techno Song"	Askari Nari	2010s	Pop/Dance/Electronic	Jan 26, 2012	No
"Grace Kelly"	The Motion Sick	2000s	Indie Rock	Jan 26, 2012	Aug 14, 2012
"Half Cab"	Quartered	2010s	Rock	Jan 26, 2012	May 29, 2012
"Play Around"	SuperSeed	2010s	Rock	Jan 26, 2012	No
"Second to Sun"	Atheist	2010s	Metal	Jan 26, 2012	No
"Super Villain"	Powerman 5000	2000s	Nu-Metal	Jan 26, 2012	Apr 10, 2012
"The Brave / Agony Applause (RB3 version)"	Deadlock	2000s	Metal	Jan 26, 2012	Mar 19, 2013
"Thug Love"	Dance for the Dying	2010s	Pop-Rock	Jan 26, 2012	May 22, 2012
"Time Bomb"	Powerman 5000	2000s	Nu-Metal	Jan 26, 2012	Apr 10, 2012
"Battle of Egos Intro"	Winter Crescent	2000s	Metal	Feb 2, 2012	No
"Building the Towers (2x Bass Pedal)"	Halcyon Way	2010s	Metal	Feb 2, 2012	No
"Feathergun in the Garden of the Sun"	Rishloo	2000s	Prog	Feb 2, 2012	Apr 24, 2012
"Für Immer Verloren"	Anarchy Club	2010s	Metal	Feb 2, 2012	Apr 17, 2012
"Good Morning Tucson"	Jonathan Coulton	2010s	Rock	Feb 2, 2012	Apr 10, 2012
"The System (2x Bass Pedal)"	Halcyon Way	2010s	Metal	Feb 2, 2012	No
"Baptised"	Codex Alimentarius	2010s	Metal	Feb 9, 2012	No
"Do Your Thing"	Powerman 5000	2000s	Nu-Metal	Feb 9, 2012	Apr 17, 2012
"Force Feedback"	Machinae Supremacy	2010s	Metal	Feb 9, 2012	May 8, 2012
"Garble Arch"	Blame Ringo	2000s	Rock	Feb 9, 2012	No
"Gravitational Lensing (2x Bass Pedal)"	Solution .45	2010s	Metal	Feb 9, 2012	No
"I'm Dirt"	Josh Blackburn	2010s	Rock	Feb 9, 2012	No
"In A Hurricane"	Blame Ringo	2010s	Pop-Rock	Feb 9, 2012	Jun 5, 2012
"Inside Looking Out (The Icon & the Ghost) (2x Bass Pedal)"	Halcyon Way	2010s	Metal	Feb 9, 2012	No
"Narcissus Metamorphosis Of"	Christian Death	2000s	Glam	Feb 9, 2012	No
"Scissorlips"	Rishloo	2000s	Prog	Feb 9, 2012	Apr 17, 2012
"Second to Sun (2x Bass Pedal)"	Atheist	2010s	Metal	Feb 9, 2012	No
"Shipwrecked (2x Bass Pedal)"	Alestorm	2010s	Metal	Feb 9, 2012	No
"Underneath the Cenotaph (2x Bass Pedal)"	Watain	2000s	Metal	Feb 9, 2012	No
"Welcome to the Skalocaust"	Sunny Side Up	2010s	Reggae/Ska	Feb 9, 2012	Apr 17, 2012
"Wild Yellowness"	Radidsh	2000s	Pop/Dance/Electronic	Feb 9, 2012	No
"Calling Out"	Engel	2000s	Metal	Feb 16, 2012	No
"Drink Beer, Destroy"	Trucker Diablo	2010s	Rock	Feb 16, 2012	No
"Easter Island Radiation"	Raggedy Angry	2010s	Pop/Dance/Electronic	Feb 16, 2012	No
"Give"	Mystic Syntax	2010s	Metal	Feb 16, 2012	No
"Heart Of A Child (2x Bass Pedal)"	A Plea for Purging	2010s	Metal	Feb 16, 2012	No
"Je Collectionne des Canards (Vivants)"	Ultra Vomit	2000s	Punk	Feb 16, 2012	Jul 3, 2012
"King of Everything"	Anarchy Club	2000s	Metal	Feb 16, 2012	Apr 17, 2012
"Lonesome Cowboy"	Richard Snow	2000s	Indie Rock	Feb 16, 2012	No
"Machine"	Strikken	2010s	Metal	Feb 16, 2012	No
"Machine (2x Bass Pedal)"	Strikken	2010s	Metal	Feb 16, 2012	No
"Put Out the Fire"	Look Left	2010s	Rock	Feb 16, 2012	No
"Rise to Revise"	Halcyon Way	2010s	Metal	Feb 16, 2012	No
"Rise to Revise (2x Bass Pedal)"	Halcyon Way	2010s	Metal	Feb 16, 2012	No
"Rocket Dragon"	Machinae Supremacy	2010s	Metal	Feb 16, 2012	Apr 24, 2012
"Song for Meg"	SIMPL3JACK	2010s	Punk	Feb 16, 2012	No
"The Thief in the Night - Part II"	Chaotrope	2010s	Metal	Feb 16, 2012	Aug 28, 2012
"Weevil Bride"	Rishloo	2000s	Prog	Feb 16, 2012	Jun 12, 2012
"Ashes"	Strikken	2010s	Metal	Feb 23, 2012	Aug 14, 2012
"Ashes (2x Bass Pedal)"	Strikken	2010s	Metal	Feb 23, 2012	No
"Built to Grind"	Anarchy Club	2000s	Metal	Feb 23, 2012	Sep 11, 2012
"Calling Out (2x Bass Pedal)	Engel	2000s	Metal	Feb 23, 2012	No
"Calling to Dance"	EA	2010s	Pop/Dance/Electronic	Feb 23, 2012	No
"Desconocido"	Leche de Tigre	2010s	Latin	Feb 23, 2012	May 29, 2012
"Ghost of Fallen Pluto (Instrumental)"	Spassm	2010s	Punk	Feb 23, 2012	No
"Not Fade Away"	Jerry Naylor	2010s	Rock	Feb 23, 2012	Oct 16, 2012
"Omega Wave"	Forbidden	2010s	Metal	Feb 23, 2012	No
"Over & Over"	Valor & Vengeance	2010s	Rock	Feb 23, 2012	No
"Por Nada"	Maríafer	2010s	Pop-Rock	Feb 23, 2012	No
"This Gigantic Robot Kills"	MC Lars feat. MC Bat Commander and Suburban Legends	2000s	Reggae/Ska	Feb 23, 2012	Jul 24, 2012
"What Do You Do When the Money Runs Out"	The Duel	2000s	Punk	Feb 23, 2012	No
"Absolute"	Gatling	2010s	Prog	Mar 1, 2012	Jul 3, 2012
"Corporate Control"	Sunny Side Up	2010s	Reggae/Ska	Mar 1, 2012	Nov 13, 2012
"Hope & Ruin"	The Trews	2010s	Rock	Mar 1, 2012	May 1, 2012
"In My Head"	Swound!	2010s	Pop-Rock	Mar 1, 2012	No
"Mystery Train"	Jerry Naylor	2010s	Rock	Mar 1, 2012	Jul 17, 2012
"Sense the Fire (2x Bass Pedal)"	Engel	2000s	Metal	Mar 1, 2012	No
"XenoChrist"	The Faceless	2000s	Metal	Mar 1, 2012	Jul 3, 2012
"Visceral"	Gnostic	2000s	Metal	Mar 6, 2012	No
"Back Through Time"	Alestorm	2010s	Metal	Mar 8, 2012	May 8, 2012
"Color Your World"	Devin Townsend	2000s	Metal	Mar 8, 2012	Nov 6, 2012
"Color Your World (2x Bass Pedal)"	Devin Townsend	2000s	Metal	Mar 8, 2012	No
"Forever in Lies"	Strikken	2010s	Metal	Mar 8, 2012	Aug 14, 2012
"I am S/H(im)e[r] as You am S/H(im)e[r] as You are Me and We am I and I are All Our Together"	Giraffes? Giraffes!	2000s	Indie Rock	Mar 8, 2012	May 29, 2012
"I Gotchu Babe"	Rachel Lynn Sebastian and DJ Jounce	2010s	R&B/Soul/Funk	Mar 8, 2012	No
"Kitty Fight Song"	Dance for the Dying	2010s	Pop-Rock	Mar 8, 2012	May 22, 2012
"Liberation"	Lucy Seven	2010s	Metal	Mar 8, 2012	No
"No War"	Brutal Assault	2010s	Metal	Mar 8, 2012	No
"Omega Wave (2x Bass Pedal)"	Forbidden	2010s	Metal	Mar 8, 2012	No
"Rise and Shine"	Anarchy Club	2000s	Metal	Mar 8, 2012	May 1, 2012
"Sense the Fire"	Engel	2000s	Metal	Mar 8, 2012	No
"Stairs on the Hill"	Roman Klun	2000s	Rock	Mar 8, 2012	No
"The Greys"	Devin Townsend	2000s	Metal	Mar 8, 2012	Nov 6, 2012
"The Jack"	Rosemary's Garden	2010s	Rock	Mar 8, 2012	No
"The Panic Range"	Claire St. Link	2000s	Metal	Mar 8, 2012	No
"Twitter Twatter"	Mind The Gap	2010s	Indie Rock	Mar 8, 2012	No
"Visceral (2x Bass Pedal)"	Gnostic	2000s	Metal	Mar 8, 2012	No
"We Actually Do This Thing Where We Drop the First String"	A Lie to Live By	2000s	Metal	Mar 8, 2012	No
"Welcome to the Future"	Left Spine Down	2000s	Punk	Mar 8, 2012	No
"XenoChrist (2x Bass Pedal)"	The Faceless	2000s	Metal	Mar 8, 2012	No
"Brains Out"	RIBS	2010s	Rock	Mar 15, 2012	Oct 23, 2012
"Creatures ov Deception (RB3 version)"	Rainbowdragoneyes	2010s	Pop/Dance/Electronic	Mar 15, 2012	Jun 26, 2012
"Creatures ov Deception (RB3 2x Bass Pedal)"	Rainbowdragoneyes	2010s	Pop/Dance/Electronic	Mar 15, 2012	No
"Force"	Bluefusion	2000s	Metal	Mar 15, 2012	No
"Galileo"	We Are The Storm	2010s	Indie Rock	Mar 15, 2012	Oct 23, 2012
"SEX"	SNMT	2010s	Other	Mar 15, 2012	No
"The Final Act"	Strikken	2010s	Metal	Mar 15, 2012	Aug 14, 2012
"The Plot to Bomb the Panhandle"	A Day to Remember	2000s	Rock	Mar 15, 2012	May 8, 2012
"Animal Instinct"	Sherryce ft. Beta Control	2010s	Pop/Dance/Electronic	Mar 22, 2012	No
"Forever in Lies (2x Bass Pedal)"	Strikken	2010s	Metal	Mar 22, 2012	No
"Insidious"	Nightrage	2010s	Metal	Mar 22, 2012	No
"Nemeses"	Jonathan Coulton ft. John Roderick	2010s	Rock	Mar 22, 2012	May 8, 2012
"Until I Feel Nothing"	Carnifex	2010s	Metal	Mar 22, 2012	Jul 31, 2012
"Broken Bones"	Aiden	2010s	Punk	Mar 29, 2012	Sep 25, 2012
"Gypsy Rave Massacre Party 2"	Sweethammer	2010s	Pop/Dance/Electronic	Mar 29, 2012	No
"Last Call"	Sworn To Oath	2010s	Rock	Mar 29, 2012	Mar 5, 2013
"No Shaking"	Bikey ft. Dapper AJ	2010s	Hip-Hop/Rap	Mar 29, 2012	No
"She's Rad"	Sunny Side Up	2010s	Reggae/Ska	Mar 29, 2012	No
"Song for the Broken"	Close Your Eyes	2010s	Metal	Mar 29, 2012	May 15, 2012
"Soul Candy"	Danny and the Lost Souls	2010s	R&B/Soul/Funk	Mar 29, 2012	No
"The Luck You Got"	The High Strung	2000s	Indie Rock	Mar 29, 2012	No
"Todo lo que Pienso"	Joe Vikingo	2010s	Rock	Mar 29, 2012	No
"You Get What You Pay For"	Jason Charles Miller	2010s	Country	Mar 29, 2012	Mar 5, 2013
"A Bullet in the Head"	Anarchy Club	2000s	Metal	Apr 5, 2012	May 8, 2012
"Greed"	The Mercy House	2010s	Grunge	Apr 5, 2012	No
"Hapless"	Seven Day Sonnet	2010s	Rock	Apr 5, 2012	Jul 10, 2012
"Me and You"	The Bitter Roots	2010s	Rock	Apr 5, 2012	No
"Our Time"	The Buffalo Joe Band	1990s	Classic Rock	Apr 5, 2012	Nov 13, 2012
"Toccata and Fugue in D Minor (Bach)"	Magnefora	2010s	Classical	Apr 5, 2012	May 15, 2012
"Valleys"	Close Your Eyes	2010s	Punk	Apr 5, 2012	May 22, 2012
"What's Left of the Right Brain?"	Single White Infidel	2010s	Punk	Apr 5, 2012	No
"Amazing Horse"	Weebl's Stuff	2000s	Novelty	Apr 12, 2012	May 22, 2012
"Heroism"	Mystakin	2010s	Prog	Apr 12, 2012	Jul 10, 2012
"IndoctriNation"	Halcyon Way	2010s	Metal	Apr 12, 2012	Jan 8, 2013
"Into Your Hands"	Kandia	2010s	Metal	Apr 12, 2012	Oct 16, 2012
"Love Dragons"	Charlie Drown	2010s	Metal	Apr 12, 2012	No
"No Holy Man"	Eden's Curse ft. James LaBrie	2010s	Prog	Apr 12, 2012	May 22, 2012
"Sleek Peak"	Mada	2010s	Pop/Dance/Electronic	Apr 12, 2012	No
"Younger Lungs"	Less Than Jake	2010s	Reggae/Ska	Apr 12, 2012	May 15, 2012
"California"	Heart Pharmacy	2010s	Alternative	Apr 19, 2012	No
"Farewell to Good Days"	Seven Day Sonnet	2010s	Rock	Apr 19, 2012	Jun 19, 2012
"Gamers Unite"	Dante's Dream	2010s	Pop/Dance/Electronic	Apr 19, 2012	Jul 17, 2012
"IndoctriNation (2x Bass Pedal)"	Halcyon Way	2010s	Metal	Apr 19, 2012	No
"Keep the Lights On"	Close Your Eyes	2010s	Punk	Apr 19, 2012	Sep 25, 2012
"Ooh La La"	Sherryce and DJ Jounce	2010s	Pop/Dance/Electronic	Apr 19, 2012	No
"Riddle Me This"	Anarchy Club	2000s	Metal	Apr 19, 2012	Jun 5, 2012
"Take Me Home"	Raggedy Angry	2010s	Pop/Dance/Electronic	Apr 19, 2012	No
"A Pure Evil (2x Bass Pedal)"	All Shall Perish	2010s	Metal	Apr 26, 2012	No
"Apple Martini"	Shelita Vaughns	2010s	R&B/Soul/Funk	Apr 26, 2012	No
"Children of Brodom"	Oklahoma Caddy Shack	2010s	Metal	Apr 26, 2012	No
"Children of Brodom (2x Bass Pedal)"	Oklahoma Caddy Shack	2010s	Metal	Apr 26, 2012	No
"Controller"	Within the Ruins	2010s	Metal	Apr 26, 2012	Dec 4, 2012
"Controller (2x Bass Pedal)"	Within the Ruins	2010s	Metal	Apr 26, 2012	No
"Interplanetary Cruise"	Jeff Ball	2010s	Pop/Dance/Electronic	Apr 26, 2012	No
"Jumping Ship"	Counterparts	2010s	Punk	Apr 26, 2012	Dec 4, 2012
"Por Analogía"	Pedro Castillo	2000s	Pop-Rock	Apr 26, 2012	No
"TGTW"	Boomchick	2010s	Indie Rock	Apr 26, 2012	No
"The Only Difference"	Cohesive	2000s	Alternative	Apr 26, 2012	No
"Wabi-Sabi"	Sky Pie	2000s	Other	Apr 26, 2012	No
"Watching"	Fallen Angel	2010s	Metal	Apr 26, 2012	No
"Wrapped in Deceitful Dreams"	Nightrage	2010s	Metal	Apr 26, 2012	No
"Wrapped in Deceitful Dreams (2x Bass Pedal)"	Nightrage	2010s	Metal	Apr 26, 2012	No
"Absolution"	Dirge Within	2010s	Metal	May 3, 2012	No
"Adonaï"	Eths	2010s	Metal	May 3, 2012	Oct 2, 2012
"All the Hated"	Sifting	2010s	Rock	May 3, 2012	No
"Blood of the Resistance"	Volumes of Revolution	2010s	Metal	May 3, 2012	No
"Coming Undone"	Shatterglass	2010s	Rock	May 3, 2012	Jul 31, 2012
"Crack My Head and Let the People Out"	Look Left	2010s	Rock	May 3, 2012	No
"Goodbye, Mr. Personality"	Less Than Jake	2010s	Reggae/Ska	May 3, 2012	Jun 19, 2012
"I Don't Want to Hear About Your Crappy Boyfriend"	Honest Bob and the Factory-to-Dealer Incentives	2000s	Indie Rock	May 3, 2012	Jul 17, 2012
"I'm Dancing!"	Bikey ft. Alyce	2010s	Hip-Hop/Rap	May 3, 2012	No
"Insidious (2x Bass Pedal)"	Nightrage	2010s	Metal	May 3, 2012	No
"Never Trust the Hazel Eyed"	Hopes Die Last	2010s	Metal	May 3, 2012	Mar 19, 2013
"Paging Ground Control"	Small Room 9	2010s	Alternative	May 3, 2012	No
"Reap (Radio Edit)"	The Red Jumpsuit Apparatus	2010s	Rock	May 3, 2012	Jun 19, 2012
"Relationship Sneakers"	Goin' Places	2010s	Punk	May 3, 2012	No
"The Death Plague"	All Shall Perish	2010s	Metal	May 3, 2012	No
"The Final Act (2x Bass Pedal)"	Strikken	2010s	Metal	May 3, 2012	No
"Wish I Was Dead"	Harbour Grace	2010s	Rock	May 3, 2012	Jul 24, 2012
"Crabplosion"	Skylliton	2010s	Metal	May 10, 2012	No
"En Donde Duermen Los Sueños"	Nod 206	2010s	Prog	May 10, 2012	No
"For the Kids of the Multiculture"	Sonic Boom Six	2010s	Rock	May 10, 2012	Dec 4, 2012
"Gravis Venter"	Eths	2010s	Metal	May 10, 2012	No
"Impulse"	An Endless Sporadic	2000s	Prog	May 10, 2012	Jun 26, 2012
"Death in the Garden"	Dance for the Dying	2010s	Pop-Rock	May 17, 2012	Jul 24, 2012
"Got 2 Me"	Ten Year Vamp	2010s	Rock	May 17, 2012	No
"L.E.V.A.N.T.A_te"	Masseratti 2lts	2010s	Pop/Dance/Electronic	May 17, 2012	No
"No War (2x Bass Pedal)"	Brutal Assault	2010s	Metal	May 17, 2012	No
"Nobody Gives a S*** About Us"	Goin' Places	2010s	Punk	May 17, 2012	No
"To the Stars"	Cohesive	2000s	Alternative	May 17, 2012	No
"Top"	Look Left	2010s	R&B/Soul/Funk	May 17, 2012	No
"Dudes and Guys and Things and Stuff"	Straight Outta Junior High	2000s	Punk	May 24, 2012	No
"So High"	Lee-Leet	2010s	Alternative	May 24, 2012	Dec 18, 2012
"5 Segundos"	Languidez	2010s	Rock	May 31, 2012	No
"Death In General (2x Bass Pedal)"	Gigakoops	2010s	Pop/Dance/Electronic	May 31, 2012	No
"Eternal Divine Angel Death (RB3 version)"	Daas Bosh	2010s	Metal	May 31, 2012	No
"Fight The Rain"	Scratching the Itch	2010s	New Wave	May 31, 2012	Dec 18, 2012
"Impulse (2x Bass Pedal)"	An Endless Sporadic	2000s	Prog	May 31, 2012	No
"La Inclinación de la Balanza"	Niño Burbuja	2010s	Indie Rock	May 31, 2012	No
"Never Trust the Hazel Eyed (2x Bass Pedal)"	Hopes Die Last	2010s	Metal	May 31, 2012	No
"Night (2x Bass Pedal)"	Gigakoops	2010s	Pop/Dance/Electronic	May 31, 2012	No
"On the Run"	Emerald	2010s	Rock	May 31, 2012	Dec 11, 2012
"Pearls; The Frailty of Matter"	The Burial	2010s	Metal	May 31, 2012	Mar 19, 2013
"Pearls; The Frailty of Matter (2x Bass Pedal)"	The Burial	2010s	Metal	May 31, 2012	No
"Reckless & Relentless"	Asking Alexandria	2010s	Metal	May 31, 2012	Jul 17, 2012
"Reson-8-R (Pts. I & II)"	Christopher J.	2010s	Pop/Dance/Electronic	May 31, 2012	Jul 31, 2012
"Skeletonizer"	Wolfcrusher	2010s	Metal	May 31, 2012	No
"The Way That It Goes"	Cohesive	2000s	Alternative	May 31, 2012	No
"Another Purity Failing"	Edenshade	2010s	Metal	Jun 7, 2012	No
"Dear Insanity"	Asking Alexandria	2010s	Metal	Jun 7, 2012	Jul 24, 2012
"Melodicus Counterpointus (2x Bass Pedal)"	Coldera	2010s	Metal	Jun 7, 2012	No
"Sarah"	Daryle Stephen Ackerman	2000s	Pop-Rock	Jun 7, 2012	No
"Skeletonizer (2x Bass Pedal)"	Wolfcrusher	2010s	Metal	Jun 7, 2012	No
"Skinny Seventeen"	Jeremy Manjorin	2010s	Rock	Jun 7, 2012	Sep 25, 2012
"The Infinite Descent"	Spires	2010s	Metal	Jun 7, 2012	No
"This is the Album You've Been Waiting For"	brentalfloss	2010s	Rock	Jun 7, 2012	Sep 18, 2012
"At War With the Cherubs"	SIMPL3JACK	2010s	Punk	Jun 14, 2012	No
"Collide"	Anarchy Club	2000s	Metal	Jun 14, 2012	Jul 31, 2012
"The Hourglass Paroxysm - Part II"	Chaotrope	2010s	Metal	Jun 14, 2012	Jan 8, 2013
"Reckless & Relentless (2x Bass Pedal)"	Asking Alexandria	2010s	Metal	Jun 14, 2012	No
"Another Purity Failing (2x Bass Pedal)"	Edenshade	2010s	Metal	Jun 21, 2012	No
"Circus Black"	Amberian Dawn	2010s	Metal	Jun 21, 2012	Aug 21, 2012
"Circus Black (2x Bass Pedal)"	Amberian Dawn	2010s	Metal	Jun 21, 2012	No
"Don't Drink the Bottle"	John Daly Project	2010s	Rock	Jun 21, 2012	No
"From the Blue/Point of No Return"	An Endless Sporadic	2000s	Prog	Jun 21, 2012	Aug 7, 2012
"Romancing the Ordinary"	Rose of Jericho	2010s	Pop-Rock	Jun 21, 2012	Aug 7, 2012
"So Far Away / Delirium Of The Fallen"	Nightrage	2010s	Metal	Jun 21, 2012	No
"Superficial"	X-Y	2010s	Rock	Jun 21, 2012	Nov 20, 2012
"The Infinite Descent (2x Bass Pedal)"	Spires	2010s	Metal	Jun 21, 2012	No
"The Ravenous"	I, Omega	2010s	Metal	Jun 21, 2012	Aug 7, 2012
"The Will"	Die Hard Till Death	2010s	Metal	Jun 21, 2012	No
"(I'm the One That's) Cool"	The Guild feat. Felicia Day	2010s	Pop-Rock	Jun 28, 2012	Aug 7, 2012
"Anything"	An Endless Sporadic	2000s	Prog	Jun 28, 2012	Aug 7, 2012
"AY"	Sin Dirección	2010s	Rock	Jun 28, 2012	No
"Chiasm"	Chaotrope	2010s	Metal	Jun 28, 2012	Jan 22, 2013
"Edge of Town"	Distant Autumn	2010s	Rock	Jun 28, 2012	No
"Frontier Factory: Remanufactured"	Freen in Green	2010s	Prog	Jun 28, 2012	Sep 11, 2012
"I Like Trains"	Lil Deuce Deuce	2010s	Reggae/Ska	Jun 28, 2012	Aug 14, 2012
"O-Ren"	SIMPL3JACK	2010s	Punk	Jun 28, 2012	No
"Political Bum"	Psychostick	2010s	Metal	Jun 28, 2012	Feb 19, 2013
"Say Sayonara (English version)"	JOANovARC	2010s	Pop-Rock	Jun 28, 2012	No
"Say Sayonara (Japanese version)"	JOANovARC	2010s	Pop-Rock	Jun 28, 2012	Sep 11, 2012
"Wasted"	Fail Emotions	2010s	Metal	Jun 28, 2012	Sep 11, 2012
"A Death"	An Unkindness	2010s	Alternative	Jul 5, 2012	Dec 4, 2012
"Alone at Home"	Jonathan Coulton	2010s	Rock	Jul 5, 2012	Sep 4, 2012
"The Border"	The Giraffes	2010s	Rock	Jul 5, 2012	No
"Discord (The Living Tombstone Remix)"	Eurobeat Brony	2010s	Pop/Dance/Electronic	Jul 5, 2012	Aug 28, 2012
"In the Wake of Evolution"	Kaipa	2010s	Prog	Jul 5, 2012	Aug 28, 2012
"The Ivory Tower"	Adept	2010s	Metal	Jul 5, 2012	No
"Rebirth"	All Shall Perish	2010s	Metal	Jul 5, 2012	No
"Whole Lotta Shakin' Goin' On"	Jerry Naylor	2000s	Rock	Jul 5, 2012	Sep 4, 2012
"Wolves"	Brand New Analogues	2010s	Rock	Jul 5, 2012	No
"Words Cannot Express"	An Unkindness	2010s	Alternative	Jul 5, 2012	No
"Evolutionary Sleeper"	Cynic	2000s	Metal	Jul 12, 2012	Sep 4, 2012
"Faster Than a Bullet"	Zing Experience	2010s	Other	Jul 12, 2012	No
"L'alfabeto"	Simone Bacchini	2000s	Pop-Rock	Jul 12, 2012	No
"Moments of Clarity"	Children of Nova	2010s	Prog	Jul 12, 2012	Aug 28, 2012
"Radiant Light"	Free Spirit	2000s	Rock	Jul 12, 2012	Aug 28, 2012
"So Far Away / Delirium Of The Fallen (2x Bass Pedal)"	Nightrage	2010s	Metal	Jul 12, 2012	No
"Subterfuge"	Terrorizer	2010s	Metal	Jul 12, 2012	No
"Tear My Heart In Two"	Daryle Stephen Ackerman	2000s	Pop-Rock	Jul 12, 2012	No
"Absolution (2x Bass Pedal)"	Dirge Within	2010s	Metal	Jul 19, 2012	No
"Episodes"	Dante's Dream	2000s	Rock	Jul 19, 2012	No
"Lady Luck"	Hillcrest	2010s	Punk	Jul 19, 2012	No
"The Death Plague (2x Bass Pedal)"	All Shall Perish	2010s	Metal	Jul 19, 2012	No
"The Duel"	Not Above Evil	2010s	Metal	Jul 19, 2012	No
"These Days"	Astra Kelly	2010s	Pop-Rock	Jul 19, 2012	Mar 12, 2013
"Walk of Shame"	My Ruin	2010s	Metal	Jul 19, 2012	No
"Angeles"	Merlot	2010s	Rock	Jul 26, 2012	No
"Everything I Hate About Myself"	Death of the Cool	2010s	Rock	Jul 26, 2012	Sep 4, 2012
"My Little Girl"	Jerry Naylor	2010s	Rock	Jul 26, 2012	Feb 12, 2013
"On Black Wings"	Halcyon Way	2010s	Metal	Jul 26, 2012	Oct 30, 2012
"Say What You Want"	Counterfeit Pennies	2010s	Punk	Jul 26, 2012	No
"Teardrops Fall Like Rain"	Jerry Naylor	2010s	Rock	Jul 26, 2012	No
"To the Stage"	Asking Alexandria	2010s	Metal	Jul 26, 2012	Sep 4, 2012
"Back Through Time (2x Bass Pedal)"	Alestorm	2010s	Metal	Aug 9, 2012	No
"Blessed Night"	Saint Vitus	2010s	Metal	Aug 9, 2012	No
"From the Ground Up"	Trial By Fire	2010s	Alternative	Aug 9, 2012	Oct 9, 2012
"Our Finest Hour"	Halcyon Way	2010s	Metal	Aug 9, 2012	Nov 13, 2012
"Rebirth (2x Bass Pedal)"	All Shall Perish	2010s	Metal	Aug 9, 2012	No
"To the Stage (2x Bass Pedal)"	Asking Alexandria	2010s	Metal	Aug 9, 2012	No
"Wrong Side"	Catsmelvin	2010s	Rock	Aug 9, 2012	No
"Hoy"	Vargas	2010s	Jazz	Aug 16, 2012	No
"Version 2"	Yogurt With Sprinkles	2010s	Pop/Dance/Electronic	Aug 16, 2012	No
"But Then I Fell in Love"	Look Left	2010s	Rock	Aug 23, 2012	No
"From the Blue/Point of No Return (2x Bass Pedal)"	An Endless Sporadic	2000s	Prog	Aug 23, 2012	No
"Move Your Body"	Eiffel 65	1990s	Pop/Dance/Electronic	Aug 23, 2012	Oct 2, 2012
"Stop Staring"	Leadership by Assault	2010s	Indie Rock	Aug 23, 2012	No
"The Restless Mind"	Francisco Meza	2010s	Prog	Aug 23, 2012	Oct 2, 2012
"Dash"	Bumblefoot	2000s	Rock	Aug 31, 2012	Oct 9, 2012
"Let's Write a Song"	Una Jensen	2010s	Pop-Rock	Aug 31, 2012	Nov 13, 2012
"Livin' the Dream"	Silent Theory	2010s	Rock	Aug 31, 2012	No
"Mind In Motion"	Art Benson	2010s	Pop-Rock	Aug 31, 2012	No
"Ride"	Fretless	2010s	Metal	Aug 31, 2012	No
"That'll Be the Day"	Jerry Naylor	2010s	Rock	Aug 31, 2012	Oct 2, 2012
"The Duel (2x Bass Pedal)"	Not Above Evil	2010s	Metal	Aug 31, 2012	No
"The Main Thing"	Nathaniel Whitlock	2010s	Other	Aug 31, 2012	No
"The Triangular Race Through Space"	An Endless Sporadic	2000s	Prog	Aug 31, 2012	Nov 6, 2012
"Wasted (2x Bass Pedal)"	Fail Emotions	2010s	Metal	Aug 31, 2012	No
"Anything (2x Bass Pedal)"	An Endless Sporadic	2000s	Prog	Sep 13, 2012	No
"Dear Insanity (2x Bass Pedal)"	Asking Alexandria	2010s	Metal	Sep 13, 2012	No
"Deconsecrated"	My Ruin	2010s	Metal	Sep 13, 2012	No
"Fight!"	Mada	2010s	Pop/Dance/Electronic	Sep 13, 2012	No
"Gambit"	Zef	2010s	Pop/Dance/Electronic	Sep 13, 2012	No
"Giant Bombstep: Reloaded"	The Hamster Alliance (ft. The Giant Bomb Crew)	2010s	Pop/Dance/Electronic	Sep 13, 2012	Jan 8, 2013
"Higher"	Tora	2010s	Pop/Dance/Electronic	Sep 13, 2012	No
"Nube"	Okills	2010s	Rock	Sep 13, 2012	No
"On Black Wings (2x Bass Pedal)"	Halcyon Way	2010s	Metal	Sep 13, 2012	No
"Sticks & Bricks"	A Day to Remember	2010s	Rock	Sep 13, 2012	Oct 9, 2012
"Supertronic Lazering"	Active Knowledge	2010s	Pop/Dance/Electronic	Sep 13, 2012	No
"The Triangular Race Through Space (2x Bass Pedal)"	An Endless Sporadic	2000s	Prog	Sep 13, 2012	No
"There is Nothing Left"	All Shall Perish	2010s	Metal	Sep 13, 2012	No
"Things That Make You Scream"	Memory of a Melody	2010s	Rock	Sep 13, 2012	Oct 30, 2012
"Under a Raging Moon"	John Parr	2010s	Classic Rock	Sep 13, 2012	Oct 16, 2012
"Would I Were"	Husky in Denial	2010s	Alternative	Sep 13, 2012	No
"Back to You"	Mikel James	2010s	Pop-Rock	Sep 18, 2012	No
"Cold Kiss"	Amberian Dawn	2010s	Metal	Sep 18, 2012	Nov 13, 2012
"Like Never Before"	Astra Kelly	2010s	Pop-Rock	Sep 18, 2012	No
"Our Finest Hour (2x Bass Pedal)"	Halcyon Way	2010s	Metal	Sep 18, 2012	No
"Phantasmal Cruise"	Shylo Elliott	2010s	Prog	Sep 18, 2012	No
"Phantasmal Cruise (2x Bass Pedal)"	Shylo Elliott	2010s	Prog	Sep 18, 2012	No
"Closer"	Strikken	2010s	Metal	Sep 20, 2012	No
"Doesn't Count"	A Life Divided	2010s	Rock	Sep 20, 2012	No
"I Believe It"	Flatfoot 56	2010s	Punk	Sep 20, 2012	No
"Majesty"	Ava Inferi	2010s	Metal	Sep 20, 2012	Oct 30, 2012
"Phoenix Down"	The Unguided	2010s	Metal	Sep 20, 2012	No
"Resolute"	Soma Dark	2010s	Metal	Sep 20, 2012	No
"Things I'll Just Pretend"	Edenshade	2010s	Metal	Sep 20, 2012	No
"Things I'll Just Pretend (2x Bass Pedal)"	Edenshade	2010s	Metal	Sep 20, 2012	No
"77345_018"	The Minotaur Project	2010s	Metal	Sep 27, 2012	Nov 27, 2012
"Acvodad"	Tobey McTired	2010s	Novelty	Sep 27, 2012	No
"Baby"	Carousel Kings	2010s	Punk	Sep 27, 2012	No
"Chaos of Forms"	Revocation	2010s	Metal	Sep 27, 2012	No
"Closer (2x Bass Pedal)"	Strikken	2010s	Metal	Sep 27, 2012	No
"Drained"	Vangough	2010s	Prog	Sep 27, 2012	Nov 20, 2012
"Fragments"	An Unkindness	2010s	Alternative	Sep 27, 2012	Mar 5, 2013
"Hate Turns Black"	Nightrage	2010s	Metal	Sep 27, 2012	No
"Hate Turns Black (2x Bass Pedal)"	Nightrage	2010s	Metal	Sep 27, 2012	No
"Keep on Running from My Love"	Danny and the Lost Souls	2010s	R&B/Soul/Funk	Sep 27, 2012	Feb 12, 2013
"Keepers of the Faith"	Terror	2010s	Punk	Sep 27, 2012	No
"Legacy of Blood"	Internal Corrosion	2010s	Metal	Sep 27, 2012	No
"One By One"	Buried in Black	2010s	Metal	Sep 27, 2012	No
"One By One (2x Bass Pedal)"	Buried in Black	2010s	Metal	Sep 27, 2012	No
"Re-Live"	Strikken	2010s	Metal	Sep 27, 2012	No
"Redeemer"	War of Ages	2010s	Metal	Sep 27, 2012	No
"Redeemer (2x Bass Pedal)"	War of Ages	2010s	Metal	Sep 27, 2012	No
"Resolute (2x Bass Pedal)"	Soma Dark	2010s	Metal	Sep 27, 2012	No
"Robots"	Sweethammer	2010s	Pop/Dance/Electronic	Sep 27, 2012	Jan 8, 2013
"Who Am I?"	MANNA	2010s	Rock	Sep 27, 2012	No
"You, Me, & the Boatman"	Quiet Company	2010s	Indie Rock	Sep 27, 2012	Jan 22, 2013
"Drained (2x Bass Pedal)"	Vangough	2010s	Prog	Oct 4, 2012	No
"Godhead"	Onslaught	2010s	Metal	Oct 4, 2012	No
"I Can Swing My Sword (ft. Terabrite)"	Toby Turner	2010s	Novelty	Oct 4, 2012	Nov 20, 2012
"Rampage of Kronos"	The Minotaur Project	2010s	Metal	Oct 4, 2012	Nov 27, 2012
"Cross Over Attack"	Emmure	2010s	Metal	Oct 11, 2012	Feb 26, 2013
"How Do You Do It?"	Quiet Company	2010s	Indie Rock	Oct 11, 2012	Jan 22, 2013
"Lonely"	The Bunny the Bear	2010s	Metal	Oct 11, 2012	Nov 27, 2012
"Para Ti"	Sin Dirección	2010s	Rock	Oct 11, 2012	No
"Stop This (NOW!)"	Tub Ring	2010s	Rock	Oct 11, 2012	No
"All Bodies"	Between the Buried and Me	2000s	Metal	Oct 18, 2012	Dec 18, 2012
"All Bodies (2x Bass Pedal)"	Between the Buried and Me	2000s	Metal	Oct 18, 2012	No
"Carny Asada"	SIMPL3JACK	2010s	Punk	Oct 18, 2012	No
"The Distance"	Drugstore Fanatics	2000s	Alternative	Oct 18, 2012	Jan 15, 2013
"Turn Back Time (Rock Band Edition)"	Escape The Day	2010s	Metal	Oct 18, 2012	No
"This War Will Never Start"	Steve Pardo	2010s	Indie Rock	Oct 24, 2012	Jan 8, 2013
"EsCupido"	Sincrónica	2010s	Rock	Oct 25, 2012	No
"Monday Night Football"	John Parr	2010s	Rock	Oct 25, 2012	Jan 15, 2013
"77345_018 (2x Bass Pedal)"	The Minotaur Project	2010s	Metal	Nov 1, 2012	No
"Angels and Demons"	Melissa Otero	2010s	Pop-Rock	Nov 1, 2012	Feb 12, 2013
"Chaos of Forms (2x Bass Pedal)"	Revocation	2010s	Metal	Nov 1, 2012	No
"Dilated Disappointment"	Wretched	2010s	Metal	Nov 1, 2012	No
"Don't Tell Me What to Dream"	God Forbid	2010s	Metal	Nov 1, 2012	Jan 29, 2013
"Evolutionary Sleeper (2x Bass Pedal)"	Cynic	2000s	Metal	Nov 1, 2012	No
"Let the Blood Spill Between My Broken Teeth"	Benighted	2010s	Metal	Nov 1, 2012	No
"There is Nothing Left (2x Bass Pedal)"	All Shall Perish	2010s	Metal	Nov 1, 2012	No
"Werewolf Grandma With Knives (Part Two: Don't Die)"	Giraffes? Giraffes!	2010s	Indie Rock	Nov 1, 2012	Jan 29, 2013
"Absolution"	One Year Later	2010s	Metal	Nov 8, 2012	No
"Absolution (2x Bass Pedal)"	One Year Later	2010s	Metal	Nov 8, 2012	No
"Kid's Gonna Rock"	The Stanleys	2010s	Pop-Rock	Nov 8, 2012	No
"Ode to Stove"	DRUOX	2010s	Rock	Nov 8, 2012	No
"Sham Piety"	Nightrage	2010s	Metal	Nov 8, 2012	No
"Sham Piety (2x Bass Pedal)"	Nightrage	2010s	Metal	Nov 8, 2012	No
"Shattered Satellites and Brutal Gods"	The Minotaur Project	2010s	Metal	Nov 8, 2012	Mar 5, 2013
"Shattered Satellites and Brutal Gods (2x Bass Pedal)"	The Minotaur Project	2010s	Metal	Nov 8, 2012	No
"Black Rose"	Icon & the Black Roses	2000s	Alternative	Nov 15, 2012	Feb 19, 2013
"Don't Go Home"	Carousel Kings	2010s	Punk	Nov 15, 2012	No
"Gold Teeth on a Bum"	The Dillinger Escape Plan	2010s	Metal	Nov 15, 2012	Jan 29, 2013
"No Surrender"	Taproot	2010s	Rock	Nov 15, 2012	Jan 29, 2013
"Rampage of Kronos (2x Bass Pedal)"	The Minotaur Project	2010s	Metal	Nov 15, 2012	No
"St. Elmo's Fire (Man in Motion)"	John Parr	1980s	Classic Rock	Nov 15, 2012	Feb 5, 2013
"Tim Tebow's Fire"	John Parr	2010s	Rock	Nov 15, 2012	No
"Gold Teeth on a Bum (2x Bass Pedal)"	The Dillinger Escape Plan	2010s	Metal	Nov 20, 2012	No
"A Single Drop of Red (The Gentleman)"	Anarchy Club	2000s	Metal	Nov 29, 2012	Feb 12, 2013
"Charnel's Ball"	Amberian Dawn	2010s	Metal	Nov 29, 2012	Feb 5, 2013
"Crusader"	AFD Shift	2000s	Hip-Hop/Rap	Nov 29, 2012	No
"Gemini"	Brian Kahanek	2000s	Blues	Nov 29, 2012	Feb 5, 2013
"Lars Attacks!"	MC Lars	2010s	Hip-Hop/Rap	Nov 29, 2012	No
"Mannequin"	Dance for the Dying	2010s	Pop-Rock	Nov 29, 2012	Feb 5, 2013
"Mary"	The Lora G Band	2010s	Rock	Nov 29, 2012	No
"Naughty Naughty"	John Parr	1980s	Pop-Rock	Nov 29, 2012	Feb 12, 2013
"People of the Deer"	The Trews	2010s	Rock	Nov 29, 2012	Jan 29, 2013
"Protoman"	Emmure	2010s	Metal	Nov 29, 2012	No
"Re-Live (2x Bass Pedal)"	Strikken	2010s	Metal	Nov 29, 2012	No
"Rehén"	Enemigo	2010s	Rock	Nov 29, 2012	No
"Rock the Halls"	Richard Campbell	2000s	Rock	Nov 29, 2012	Feb 26, 2013
"The Christmas Song (Live)"	Distant Autumn	2010s	Rock	Nov 29, 2012	No
"Turn Back Time (Rock Band Edition) (2x Bass Pedal)"	Escape The Day	2010s	Metal	Nov 29, 2012	No
"Battle of Egos Part II"	Winter Crescent	2000s	Metal	Dec 6, 2012	No
"Circus"	IDLEMINE	2010s	Rock	Dec 6, 2012	No
"Dozing Green"	Dir En Grey	2000s	Metal	Dec 6, 2012	Feb 19, 2013
"Jasmin W. Knows How to Mosh"	His Statue Falls	2010s	Metal	Dec 6, 2012	Feb 26, 2013
"Leave It All Behind"	Cult to Follow	2010s	Rock	Dec 6, 2012	No
"Superföhn Bananendate"	We Butter the Bread with Butter	2010s	Metal	Dec 6, 2012	Mar 5, 2013
"The City"	The Giraffes	2010s	Rock	Dec 6, 2012	No
"The Singularity"	Chaotrope	2010s	Metal	Dec 6, 2012	No
"Last"	Dante	2010s	Prog	Dec 13, 2012	No
"Shapeshifter"	One Year Later	2010s	Metal	Dec 13, 2012	No
"Shapeshifter (2x Bass Pedal)"	One Year Later	2010s	Metal	Dec 13, 2012	No
"Splitting Time"	Nuke Wrath Tech	2010s	Pop/Dance/Electronic	Dec 13, 2012	No
"The Duel"	Rusty Cooley	2000s	Metal	Dec 13, 2012	Mar 12, 2013
"The Window"	Kenny Wesley	2010s	R&B/Soul/Funk	Dec 13, 2012	No
"Amylee"	The Michael J. Epstein Memorial Library	2010s	Indie Rock	Dec 20, 2012	No
"Battle of Egos Part II (2x Bass Pedal)"	Winter Crescent	2000s	Metal	Dec 20, 2012	No
"Break Away"	Memory of a Melody	2010s	Rock	Dec 20, 2012	Mar 12, 2013
"Hageshisa to, Kono Mune no Naka de Karamitsuita Shakunetsu no Yami"	Dir En Grey	2010s	Metal	Dec 20, 2012	Mar 12, 2013
"Impossible Landscape"	Children of Nova	2010s	Prog	Dec 20, 2012	Apr 2, 2013
"Silence of a Gun"	Mob Machine	2010s	Rock	Dec 20, 2012	No
"The Final Battle"	Freen in Green	2010s	Prog	Dec 20, 2012	Mar 26, 2013
"The Final Battle (2x Bass Pedal)"	Freen in Green	2010s	Prog	Dec 20, 2012	No
"Highly Explosive"	My Ruin	2010s	Metal	Jan 3, 2013	No
"In This Life of Pain"	All Shall Perish	2010s	Metal	Jan 3, 2013	No
"Monument"	ANKST	2000s	Glam	Jan 3, 2013	No
"The Living End"	Ava Inferi	2010s	Metal	Jan 3, 2013	Apr 2, 2013
"Two Thousand Eight Hundred"	Sacred Mother Tongue	2010s	Metal	Jan 3, 2013	No
"Floating Feather (Blue Day & Age)"	Bright Midnight	2010s	Rock	Jan 10, 2013	No
"Great Balls of Fire"	Jerry Lee Lewis	2000s	Rock	Jan 10, 2013	Apr 2, 2013
"KITTY! (ft. The Anime Cow)"	Bluefusion	2000s	Metal	Jan 10, 2013	No
"KITTY! (ft. The Anime Cow) (2x Bass Pedal)"	Bluefusion	2000s	Metal	Jan 10, 2013	No
"Liberation"	Bright Midnight	2010s	Rock	Jan 10, 2013	No
"Parasitic Twins"	The Dillinger Escape Plan	2010s	Metal	Jan 10, 2013	Apr 2, 2013
"Smartass Rascals"	The Smartass Rascals	2010s	Rock	Jan 10, 2013	No
"Sober Up"	Leadership by Assault	2010s	Indie Rock	Jan 10, 2013	No
"Vultures"	My Ruin	2010s	Metal	Jan 10, 2013	No
"300 Thousand Miles"	Jack Bundy	2010s	Punk	Jan 17, 2013	No
"All the Fires Burning"	Anarchy Club	2010s	Rock	Jan 17, 2013	No
"Be With Me"	Goin' Places	2010s	Punk	Jan 17, 2013	No
"Make the Sauce"	Vegan Black Metal Chef	2010s	Metal	Jan 17, 2013	Mar 12, 2013
"Ordinary Objects"	Dance for the Dying	2010s	Pop-Rock	Jan 17, 2013	Apr 2, 2013
"Guys, You're Not Dead Yet"	BabelFish	2010s	Alternative	Jan 24, 2013	No
"Level 1 - Winter City"	Freen in Green	2010s	Pop/Dance/Electronic	Jan 24, 2013	No
"Silent Night"	War of Ages	2010s	Metal	Jan 24, 2013	No
"Standing Still"	The Break Down	2000s	R&B/Soul/Funk	Jan 24, 2013	No
"Alarms"	RIBS	2010s	Rock	Jan 31, 2013	No
"Beautiful Killer"	Panic the Memory	2010s	Glam	Jan 31, 2013	No
"Endless Sky"	I See Stars	2010s	Metal	Jan 31, 2013	Mar 19, 2013
"More"	Down June	2000s	Rock	Jan 31, 2013	Mar 26, 2013
"This is Not a Song, It's a Sandwich!"	Psychostick	2000s	Metal	Jan 31, 2013	Mar 19, 2013
"Timebomb"	Astra Kelly	2010s	Pop-Rock	Jan 31, 2013	No
"Abre Tus Ojos"	Lucybell	2010s	Rock	Feb 7, 2013	No
"Bottle Rocket"	Brian Kahanek	2010s	Blues	Feb 7, 2013	No
"Deception"	Nightmare Lyre	2010s	Prog	Feb 7, 2013	No
"Deception (2x Bass Pedal)"	Nightmare Lyre	2010s	Prog	Feb 7, 2013	No
"NZT48"	I See Stars	2010s	Metal	Feb 7, 2013	No
"Redirect"	Your Memorial	2010s	Metal	Feb 7, 2013	No
"Trapped In Your Lies"	Godhead	2000s	Rock	Feb 7, 2013	No
"Welcome to Our Town (RB3 version)"	Stagehands	2000s	Pop-Rock	Feb 7, 2013	No
"At the Cathedral"	John Parr	2010s	Other	Feb 14, 2013	No
"Synesthesia"	Chaotrope	2010s	Metal	Feb 14, 2013	No
"Virus"	Sonic Boom Six	2010s	Rock	Feb 14, 2013	No
"10,000 Headless Horses"	Our Last Enemy	2010s	Metal	Feb 21, 2013	No
"American Terrorist"	Deception of a Ghost	2010s	Metal	Feb 21, 2013	No
"Discord (EuroChaos Mix)"	Eurobeat Brony ft. Odyssey	2010s	Pop/Dance/Electronic	Feb 21, 2013	Mar 26, 2013
"Haben Haben Haben"	Dampfmaschine	2010s	Punk	Feb 21, 2013	No
"Hordes of Zombies"	Terrorizer	2010s	Metal	Feb 21, 2013	No
"Rise Above"	Van Friscia	2010s	Prog	Feb 21, 2013	Mar 26, 2013
"Integral Birth"	Cynic	2000s	Metal	Feb 28, 2013	No
"Integral Birth (2x Bass Pedal)"	Cynic	2000s	Metal	Feb 28, 2013	No
"King of Those Who Know"	Cynic	2000s	Metal	Feb 28, 2013	Mar 26, 2013
"Need"	Edenshade	2010s	Metal	Feb 28, 2013	No
"Overdriven"	Left Spine Down	2010s	Punk	Feb 28, 2013	No
"Passing the Ace"	Chad Smith's Bombastic Meatbats	2010s	R&B/Soul/Funk	Feb 28, 2013	No
"Return to Strength"	Terror	2010s	Punk	Feb 28, 2013	No
"Revolution is Now"	Halcyon Way	2010s	Metal	Feb 28, 2013	No
"Revolution is Now (2x Bass Pedal)"	Halcyon Way	2010s	Metal	Feb 28, 2013	No
"Santa Fe (RB3 version)"	Blackberry River Band	2000s	Country	Feb 28, 2013	No
"Shizuku"	Esprit D'Air	2010s	J-Rock	Feb 28, 2013	No
"Show Me a Sign"	Azania	2010s	R&B/Soul/Funk	Feb 28, 2013	No
"Skeleton"	Adora	2010s	Punk	Feb 28, 2013	No
"The Duel"	Van Friscia	2010s	Prog	Feb 28, 2013	No
"The Duel (2x Bass Pedal)"	Van Friscia	2010s	Prog	Feb 28, 2013	No
"You Can't Swim With Concrete Shoes"	Throw the Fight	2010s	Metal	Feb 28, 2013	No
"¿De qué Sirve?"	Okills	2010s	Rock	Feb 28, 2013	No
"American Terrorist (2x Bass Pedal)"	Deception of a Ghost	2010s	Metal	Mar 7, 2013	No
"Ave Fénix"	Lucybell	2010s	Rock	Mar 7, 2013	No
"Filth Friends Unite"	I See Stars	2010s	Metal	Mar 7, 2013	No
"Let the Blood Spill Between My Broken Teeth (2x Bass Pedal)"	Benighted	2010s	Metal	Mar 7, 2013	No
"Madness is God"	A Life Once Lost	2010s	Metal	Mar 7, 2013	No
"One"	Those Among Us	2010s	New Wave	Mar 7, 2013	No
"Onyx"	Ava Inferi	2010s	Metal	Mar 7, 2013	No
"Regeneration"	Tyler Green	2010s	Pop/Dance/Electronic	Mar 7, 2013	No
"Synesthesia (2x Bass Pedal)"	Chaotrope	2010s	Metal	Mar 7, 2013	No
"Transformation Pt. 1"	Fail Emotions	2010s	Metal	Mar 7, 2013	No
"Widower"	The Dillinger Escape Plan	2010s	Metal	Mar 7, 2013	No
"You're Gonna Say Yeah!"	Hushpuppies	2000s	Rock	Mar 7, 2013	No
"Hell Yeah"	Rhythm Bastard	2010s	Rock	Mar 14, 2013	No
"Laser Speed Force"	Machinae Supremacy	2010s	Metal	Mar 14, 2013	No
"Neighbors Ate My Zombies!"	Freen in Green	2010s	Prog	Mar 14, 2013	No
"Thrashbaath"	Rainbowdragoneyes	2010s	Pop/Dance/Electronic	Mar 14, 2013	No
"It's Better to Spend Money Like There's No Tomorrow Than Spend Tonight Like There's No Money"	Quiet Company	2000s	Indie Rock	Mar 21, 2013	No
"The Light"	The Lora G Band	2010s	Rock	Mar 21, 2013	No
"Thrashbaath (2x Bass Pedal)"	Rainbowdragoneyes	2010s	Pop/Dance/Electronic	Mar 21, 2013	No
"Unleash Hell"	Hopes Die Last	2010s	Metal	Mar 21, 2013	No
"The New Blood"	Terror	2010s	Punk	Mar 28, 2013	No
"Unleash Hell (2x Bass Pedal)"	Hopes Die Last	2010s	Metal	Mar 28, 2013	No
"Vapor Radian"	Jeff Ball	2010s	Pop/Dance/Electronic	Mar 28, 2013	No
"Hero"	Machinae Supremacy	2010s	Metal	May 2, 2013	No
"Presence Everlasting"	Nonexist	2010s	Metal	May 2, 2013	No
"The End of Prom Night"	Snow White's Poison Bite	2010s	Emo	May 2, 2013	No
"Fire At Will"	Nonexist	2010s	Metal	May 23, 2013	No
"The Journey"	Grand Warp Focus	2010s	Prog	May 23, 2013	No
"Via Dela Rosa"	Scum of the Earth	2010s	Nu-Metal	May 23, 2013	No
"Halcyon"	Chaotrope	2010s	Metal	Jun 6, 2013	No
"Victory"	Christian Muenzner	2010s	Metal	Jun 6, 2013	No
"Beyond the Night"	Richard Campbell	2010s	Prog	Jun 20, 2013	No
"Humanoid"	SIMPL3JACK	2010s	Punk	Jun 20, 2013	No
"Trixie"	Jeff Burgess	2010s	Alternative	Jun 20, 2013	No
"Republic of Gamers"	Machinae Supremacy	2010s	Metal	Jul 1, 2013	No
"The Modern Prometheus"	Richard Campbell	2010s	Prog	Aug 28, 2013	No
"Thirteen (ft. M_80!, Watershed & Wolfblur"	Bluefusion	2010s	Prog	Aug 30, 2013	No
"The Spark of Life"	Richard Campbell	2010s	Prog	Oct 3, 2013	No
"Wake Up"	SOiL	2010s	Metal	Oct 3, 2013	No
"Free Fall"	Rose of Jericho	2010s	Pop-Rock	Jan 10, 2014	No
