= Into the Enchanted Chamber =

Studio album by Timeless Miracle
- Released: 30 May 2005
- Recorded: 2005 at Trapped Studios (Malmö) and RoastingHouse Studio 1 (Malmö)
- Genre: Power metal
- Length: 64:34
- Label: Massacre Records; Marquee/Avalon
- Producer: Anders Theander; Pontus Lindmark; Timeless Miracle

Timeless Miracle chronology
The Voyage (2004)	Into the Enchanted Chamber (2005)	Under the Moonlight (TBA)

Into the Enchanted Chamber is the début full-length album by the power metal band Timeless Miracle. It was released on 30 May 2005 by Massacre Records. It was generally well-received both popularly and critically; for instance, it was voted to be in the top 20 albums of 2005 by the users of the Metal Storm webzine.

== Background ==
After its re-formation in 2001, Timeless Miracle, then known as Trapped, was composed of only two members, Mikael Holst and Fredrik Nilsson, who considered the band to be merely a hobby, but decided to record three demos in 2002–2004 using a drum machine. In 2004, the band was approached by a record label with an offer of a contract. In 2005, after the line-up was completed by the drummer Jaime Salazar and the guitarist Sten Möller, Timeless Miracle began recording their début album, mainly composed of tracks that first appeared on the demos.

== Music ==
Into the Enchanted Chamber is a melodies-driven album with prominent keyboards, influenced by the classical and folk music. The lyrics, dealing with the supernatural themes, are greatly inspired by the old horror movies, such as The Wolf Man and Curse of the Devil, as well as by the medieval Nordic folklore and create a dark atmosphere, in contrast to the much more joyous-sounding music. The songs with the strong folkloric influences include "Witches of Black Magic", which is inspired by the legends of Blockula and "Return of the Werewolf", featuring Little Red Riding Hood. The title track explores the theme of a religious cult, which drives its followers to mass suicide. The ballad "Memories" is the only track not to appear on the demos, having been written long prior. Over 14 minutes long, "The Voyage" is the longest and the most diverse track of the album; it took almost six months to compose and arrange.

== Track listing ==
No.	Title	Writer(s)	Length
1.	"Curse of the Werewolf"	Mikael Holst & Fredrik Nilsson	7:15
2.	"Witches of Black Magic"	Holst & Nilsson	4:24
3.	"Into the Enchanted Chamber"	Holst & Nilsson	6:07
4.	"The Devil"	Holst & Nilsson	5:30
5.	"The Red Rose"	Holst & Nilsson	5:43
6.	"A Minor Intermezzo"	Nilsson	1:21
7.	"Return of the Werewolf"	Holst & Nilsson	4:55
8.	"Memories"	Kim Widfors, Holst & Nilsson	4:13
9.	"The Gates of Hell"	Holst & Nilsson	4:21
10.	"Down to the Gallows"	Holst & Nilsson	5:46
11.	"The Dark Side Forest"	Holst & Nilsson	0:47
12.	"The Voyage; I. "Prelude to Dying"; II. "Pray for Daylight"; III. "Kiss of Life (Prelude Revisited)"; IV. "The Turning"; V. "Under a Harvest Moon"; VI. "Back from the Past"; VII. "The Ghost Vessel"; VIII. "A Journey's End""	Holst & Nilsson	14:10
Total length:			64:34

Japanese edition bonus track
No.	Title	Writer(s)	Length
13.	"Church of the Damned"	Holst & Nilsson	4:38
Total length:			69:12

== Credits ==
- Mikael Holst – vocals/bass
- Fredrik Nilsson – keyboards/guitars
- Sten Möller – guitars
- Jaime Salazar – drums
