= Neonfly =

British metal band

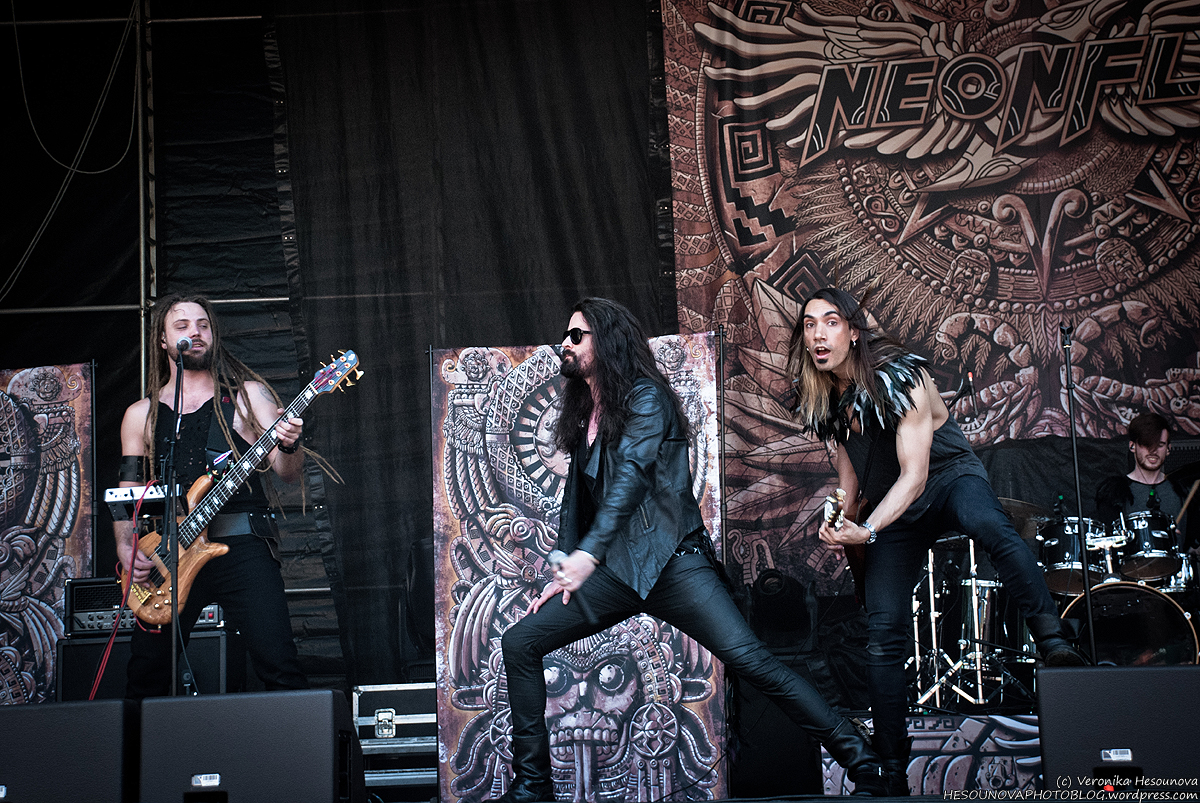
- Neonfly at Metalfest in Plzeň, Czech Republic, 2017. From left to right: Paul Miller, Willy Norton, Frederick Thunder, Declan Brown

Background information
- Origin: London, England, UK
- Genres: Metal; rock
- Years active: 2008–present
- Labels: Noble Demon; Absolute Label Services; Inner Wound Recordings; Rising Records
- Members: Frederick Thunder; Paul Miller; Willy Norton; Declan Brown
- Past members: Mauricio Chamusero; Tamas Csemez; Patrick Harrington; Boris Le Gal; Andy Midgley
- Website: NeonflyUK

Neonfly is a British metal band who have released three albums to date: The Future, Tonight (2021), Strangers In Paradise (2014) and Outshine The Sun (2011).

== Group history ==
=== Origins (2008–2010) ===
Created in 2008, the brainchild of guitarist and composer Frederick Thunder.

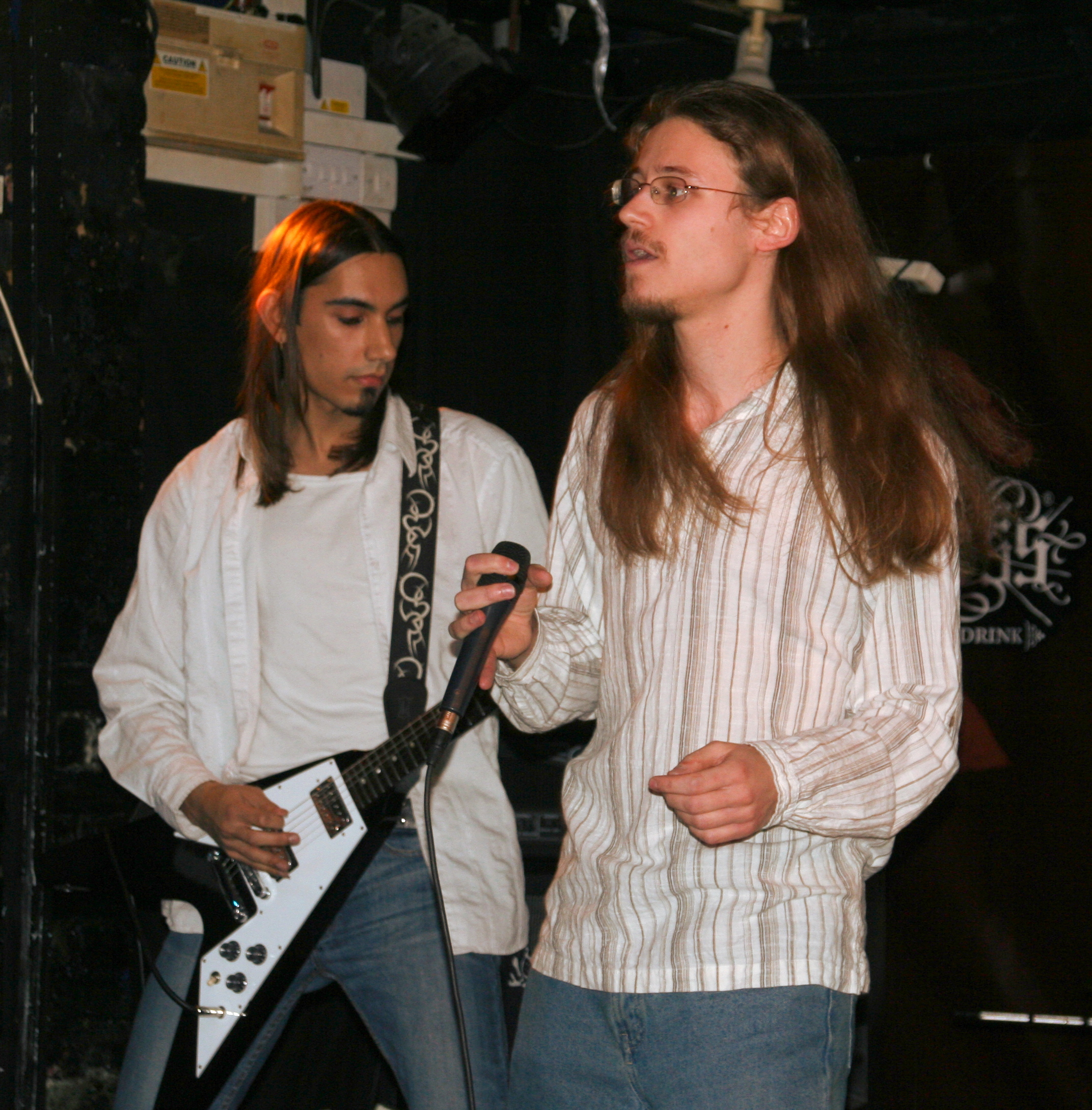
Frederick Thunder and Tamas Csemez, playing with Neonfly in 2008.

Neonfly originally consisted of:

- Frederick Thunder- guitar
- Tamas Csemez - vocals
- Paul Miller - bass, background/growl vocals
- Patrick Harrington - guitar
- Boris Le Gal – drums

Thunder stated that he came up with the name Neonfly "as a silent protest after realizing that Orchestral Manoeuvres in the Dark was already taken". The band's first EP, Clever Disguise, released in 2008 and featuring backing vocals from ex-Shy/TNT vocalist Tony Mills, was critically well received by the press and underground metal community alike. The band opened for Power Quest, Adagio and To-Mera in support of the EP, as well as performing at several European festivals in 2009–10.

UK tours followed in 2010 with the band opening for H.E.A.T., Arthemis and Freedom Call. Tour highlights included a set on the New Blood Stage at Bloodstock Open Air Festival where they debuted new Irish singer Willy Norton. Norton replaced original singer, Tamas Csemez after an amicable split, and gave his first performance with the band with just one week’s preparation.

The band's Bloodstock performance resulted in an invitation to feature their track "Ship With No Sails" on the video game Rock Band 3.

=== Outshine The Sun (2011–2013) ===
In February 2011, the band entered Remaster Studios in Vicenza, Italy, to record their debut album with producer, and ex-White Skull guitarist, Nick Savio (Power Quest, Arthemis, Raintime). The result of this collaboration was Neonfly’s debut album, Outshine The Sun, whose recording was soon followed by UK tour dates with Power Quest and Pagan’s Mind.

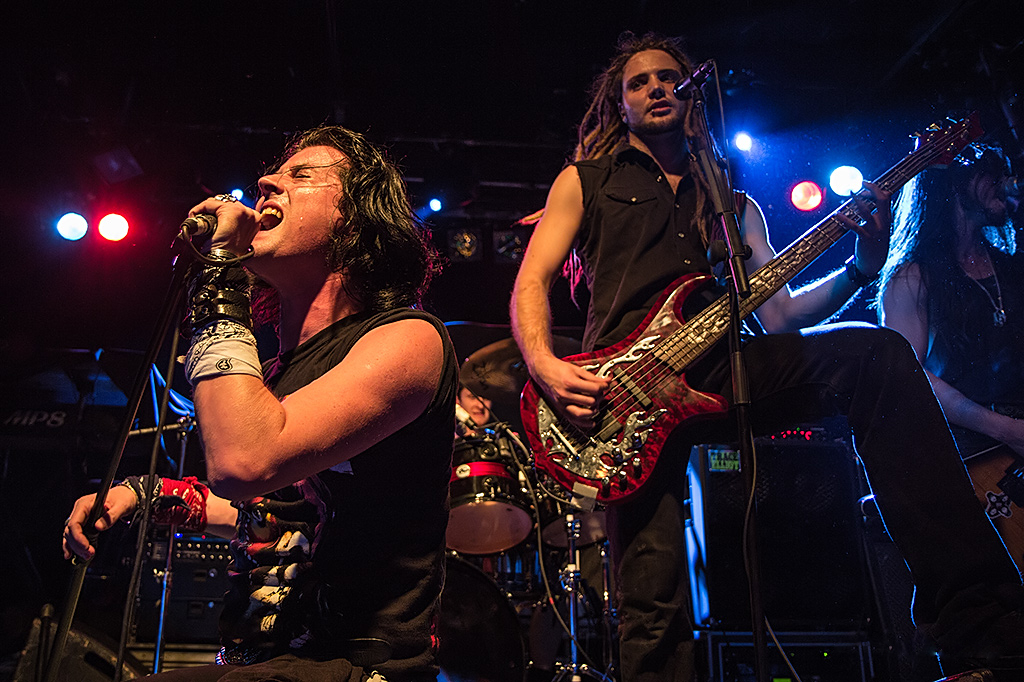
Willy Norton and Paul Miller, Germany, 2012

The album quickly attracted the attention of British label Rising Records, who released the album on 29 August 2011. The band’s debut single, "A Gift To Remember", was released alongside their first video. Although received positively, Rising Records later collapse critically hampered the commercial momentum of Outshine The Sun.

Shortly after the release of Outshine The Sun, Neonfly were asked by their old touring partners Freedom Call to record a cover of one of their songs for the limited edition bonus disc of their seventh studio album "Land of the Crimson Dawn". Neonfly chose the Freedom Call classic "Land of Light" and recorded it in a symphonic metal arrangement. It was released on 24 February 2012 via SPV in Germany, the Europe-wide release on 27 February, and the North American release on 28 February.

Undeterred the band toured the record remorselessly, with UK dates opening for Finnish melodic metallers Sonata Arctica, a performance on the Jägermeister stage at Download 2012, and a one-off support slot for Norwegian metallers TNT. Winter 2012 saw Neonfly opening for Magnum across Europe.

The band were booked to play Masters Of Rock Festival 2013, performing in front of 10,000 Czech fans and returned to the UK to perform at Bloodstock 2013 both on the Sophie Lancaster stage and backstage in an exclusive acoustic set on the Gibson Tour Bus.

The band received an invitation to open for Alice Cooper on the initial German dates of his 2013 Raise The Dead Tour.

By 2013 the band, still without a record deal, entered HOFA Studios in Karlsdorf, (Germany), where they recorded their second album, helmed by producer Dennis Ward (Angra, Unisonic, Krokus, Primal Fear, Pink Cream 69) with orchestral arrangements by Günter Werno (it:Günter Werno) (Vanden Plas). Their sophomore effort was ready by mid-2013.

=== Strangers In Paradise (2014–2015) ===
Neonfly began negotiations with Swedish label Inner Wound Recordings in 2014, and finally signed their second contract whilst on a UK/European tour, again with Magnum. A tour that was also notable for the band surviving a mid-tour tour-bus robbery that led to the loss of most of their instruments.

Although delayed for two years, the new album, Strangers in Paradise, was finally released on 28 November 2014 in Europe, 1 December in the UK and 2 December in North America. Strangers In Paradise displayed a band that was clearly maturing and developing its own distinctive sound. The album, partly inspired by Aztec / Mesoamerican culture, utilised artwork from noted American artist Jorge "Qetza" Garza. Received positively by press and fans alike Strangers In Paradise garnered 4Ks in Kerrang! Magazine.

2014, was marked by an 18-show opening stint with power metal legends Dragonforce in the UK that consolidated and expanded the band's UK fan base. The tour culminated days after the album’s release at London’s Kentish Town Forum in support of Dragonforce and headliners, Epica. The tour was the first to feature Andy Midgley (ex-Power Quest/I Am I) on lead guitar. Midgley was formally announced as a permanent replacement for Patrick Harrington in February 2015.

The band released their single "Better Angels" on 2 March 2015 with an exclusive b-side of "Falling Star" (piano version) featuring Günter Werno. The single was supported by a video shot in Cyprus featuring Team GB 2012 Olympians Lynne Hutchison and Jade Faulkner. October saw the release of the band’s third video for single "Highways To Nowhere".

=== European tour and festivals (2015–2018) ===
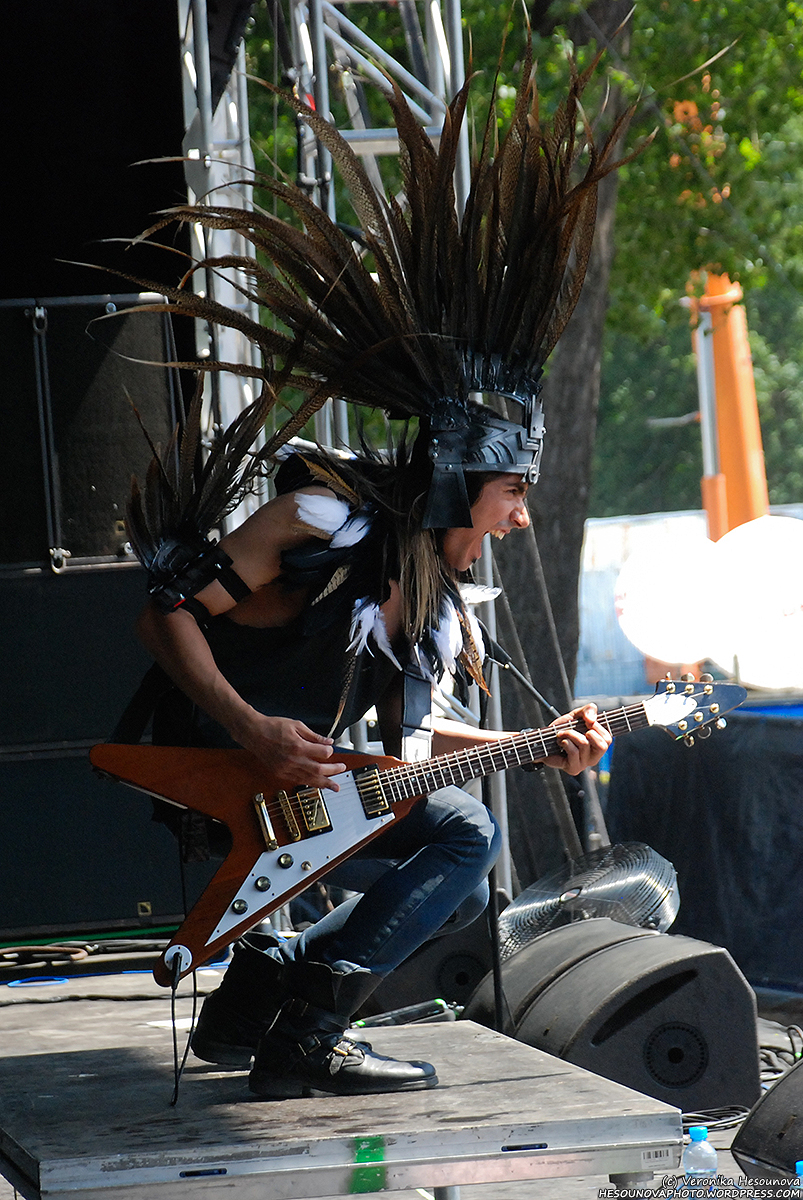
Frederick Thunder, leader and composer of Neonfly. Masters of Rock 2015

Neonfly, already confirmed for a main stage slot at the 2015 Masters of Rock festival also announced an 18 date European tour in November and December as openers for metal legends Gamma Ray, with two additional German dates opening for long-time tour-mates, Freedom Call.

The end of the touring cycle for the album saw the departure of drummer Boris Le Gal (Betraying The Martyrs). With the recruitment of new drummer Dec Brown (ex-Fallen To Flux) in 2017 the band went on to open for Alice Cooper at a sold out Junge Garde in Dresden, and toured Europe with metal legends Anvil in 2018, all the while taking their time to compose their long delayed third album.

=== The Future, Tonight – a new sound (2019 – present) ===
Neonfly definitively returned on 24 May 2019 with the release of single "This World is Burning", on Absolute Label Services. The single, the first from third album The Future, Tonight signalled a turn towards a more contemporary rock-oriented sound allied with decidedly socially conscious lyrics.

Produced by Grammy Award nominated producer Romesh Dodangoda, (Motörhead, Funeral For A Friend, Bring Me The Horizon) and off the back of a successful crowdfund campaign, the band finished recording their new album at Long Wave Studios in Cardiff in November 2019.

Neonfly announced their worldwide signing with German metal/rock label Noble Demon in November 2020.

Neonfly celebrated the release of their 3rd album 'The Future, Tonight' on 18 June 2021 marking stylistic turn towards a new more contemporary metal sound.

May 2022 saw Neonfly support Dutch Symphonic metallers Epica across Mexico including a performance at Mexico City's Pepsi Centre WTC.

The band performed at the 2022 Masters of Rock Festival (Vizovice, Czech Republic) and Rock Imperium (Cartagena, Spain) sharing bills with Scorpions, Whitesnake and Judas Priest among many others.

In June 2023 Neonfly support Escape The Fate across Germany and perform at festivals across the UK.

== Discography ==
=== EPs ===
- 2008 – Clever Disguise

=== Studio albums ===
- 2011 – Outshine The Sun
- 2014 – Strangers In Paradise
- 2021 – The Future, Tonight

=== Singles ===
- 2015 – "Better Angels"
- 2019 – "This World Is Burning"
- 2021 – "Venus"

== Group composition ==
=== Current members ===
- Frederick Thunder – guitar (2008–present)
- Paul Miller – bass, backing vocals (2008–present)
- Willy Norton – vocals (2010–present)
- Declan (Dec) Brown – drums, percussion (2019–present)

=== Former members ===
- Mauricio Chamusero – drums (2008–2009)
- Tamas Csemez – vocals (2008–2010)
- Patrick Harrington – guitar, backing vocals (2008–2014)
- Boris Le Gal – drums (2009-2016)
- Andy Midgley – guitar, backing vocals (2015–2018)

=== Session/Concert Participants ===
- Tony Mills – vocals (2008)
- Mirko Fadda – guitar (2018–2022)
- Ryszard Gabrielczyk - Guitar (2022 - Present)
