= The Asbestos =

Venezuelan rock band

- Origin: Caracas, Venezuela
- Genres: Alternative rock, pop punk
- Years active: 2004 - present
- Members: David Donoso "Topo"; José Luis Gutierrez "Pizza"; Juan Alejandro Donoso; Nicolás Marchena
- Past members: Jorge Contramaestre (Drums); Daniel Jelinek "Cheky" (Drums)

The Asbestos is an alternative rock band from Venezuela formed in 2004 in the city of Caracas. The founding members are David Donoso, José Gutierrez, Juan Donoso and Jorge Contramaestre. In 2007, Jorge left the band and was replaced by Daniel Jelinek.

In 2009, their first single, Jack And The Harlots had success in Venezuelan radio. Although they tend to write their lyrics in English, people from Venezuela have been very receptive. The Asbestos have claimed good reviews and remain one of the most promising bands in their country. Their second single, She, also gave them great acclaim and increased the interest of public and media in the band. For 2009 they were invited to several popular TV shows in Venezuela.

Recently the band recorded their first official video "Jack And The Harlots" produced and directed by Balkong Studios and Flashback Producciones. It was released on November 18 in an open concert. Waking the Nightmares, their first album, was released on July 27 of 2010.

== Members ==
- David Donoso (Guitar/Lead Vocals)
- Nicolas Marchena (Drums)
- José Luis Gutierrez (Guitar)
- Juan Alejandro Donoso (Bass/Backing Vocals)

== Discography ==
- Waking the Nightmares (2010)
