= Timeless Miracle =

- Origin: Malmö, Sweden
- Genre: Power metal
- Years active: 1995, 2001–2008, 2014–present
- Labels: Massacre Records; Marquee/Avalon
- Members: Mikael Holst; Fredrik Nilsson; Kim Widfors
- Past members: Jaime Salazar; Sten Möller
- Website: timelessmiracle.com

Timeless Miracle is a power metal band from Malmö, Sweden, formed in late 1995. Originally named Trapped, the band soon broke up without releasing any materials. The collective re-formed in 2001 and recorded three demos. Having changed their name to Timeless Miracle, the band released their début album Into the Enchanted Chamber through Massacre Records in 2005. The band began recording their second album, Under the Moonlight, in May 2007. The album is in pre-production as of April 2015.

== Biography ==
Trapped was formed in late 1995 by Mikael Holst, Fredrik Nilsson and Kim Widfors; the name was inspired by the eponymous album by the German heavy metal band Rage. Having played a few gigs in their hometown, the band broke up after Widfors decided to study bartending in England. Holst and Nilsson decided to resume the band's activity in 2001 and recorded three demos in 2002–2004, using a drum machine. In 2004, RoastingHouse Studios in Malmö agreed to manage the band and to finance recording of their début album. The line-up was completed by the guitarist Sten Möller and the drummer Jaime Salazar. The band's name was changed to Timeless Miracle, after one of their unrecorded songs. In May–June 2005, their first album, Into the Enchanted Chamber was released by Massacre Records in Europe, Canada, Australia and New Zealand and by Marquee/Avalon in Japan and Southeast Asia.

Timeless Miracle started recording their second album, tentatively titled Under the Moonlight, in May 2007 at their own studio with the initial goal to release it later that year. However, technical difficulties during the recording process pushed the planned release date to early 2008. In January 2008, the band announced the departure of Salazar due to his work with other bands and return of Widfors, the original drummer. Timeless Miracle revealed a partial track list and released a sample from the song "Queen of Egypt" before the last update on their official web-site appeared in September 2008. As of 2014, the band was announced to be contributing a cover to a Sonata Arctica tribute album. The band noted that if it goes over well, they may feel more motivated to start new work. Their official website was relaunched on the 21 November 2014.

In 2017, Timeless Miracle released a clip from their upcoming album Under the Moonlight for a song entitled Voices from the Past. Subsequently in 2023, the band posted on their Facebook page in reference to new material that they had "10 songs and they're ageing like a fine wine on the studio's harddrive".

== Musical style ==
Trapped was originally a traditional heavy metal band, whose sound evolved to become the melodies-driven power metal with influences of the classical and folk music; the lyrics are inspired by the horror movies and the Nordic tales. Under the Moonlight has been stated to be stylistically very similar to the début, while adding elements of the electronic and the Eastern European folk music.

== Members ==
Current

- Mikael Holst – vocals, bass
- Fredrik Nilsson – keyboards, guitars
- Kim Widfors – drums

Former

- Jaime Salazar – drums
- Sten Möller – guitars

== Discography ==
=== Demos ===
- In the Year of Our Lord (2002)
- The Enchanted Chamber (2003)
- The Voyage (2004)

=== Albums ===
- Into the Enchanted Chamber (2005)
- Under the Moonlight (TBA)
