= Vegan Black Metal Chef =

American musician and cook

Brian Manowitz, better known as Vegan Black Metal Chef, (Tampa, 1981?) is a cook, YouTuber and musician that uploads into YouTube cooking recipes videos with black metal music singing the recipes. His activity at YouTube as Vegan Black Metal Chef began in 2011. He records in Orlando, in a kitchen with a dungeon decor dressed in a peculiar way (a vinyl armor). He is a member of the music group Forever Dawn and is a keyboardist for the group Fields of Glass.

When he was in college he quit eating meat. He studied behavior neuroscience at Gainesville. He moved to Orlando after finishing his studies. He had the idea of Vegan Black Metal Chef when he thought of showing what vegans eat in a "simple" way.

In 2013, Vegan Black Metal Chef was featured in truTV Presents: World's Dumbest... where his video was placed in #14 on the show's countdown of dumbest TV shows.
