= Sam Ryder discography =

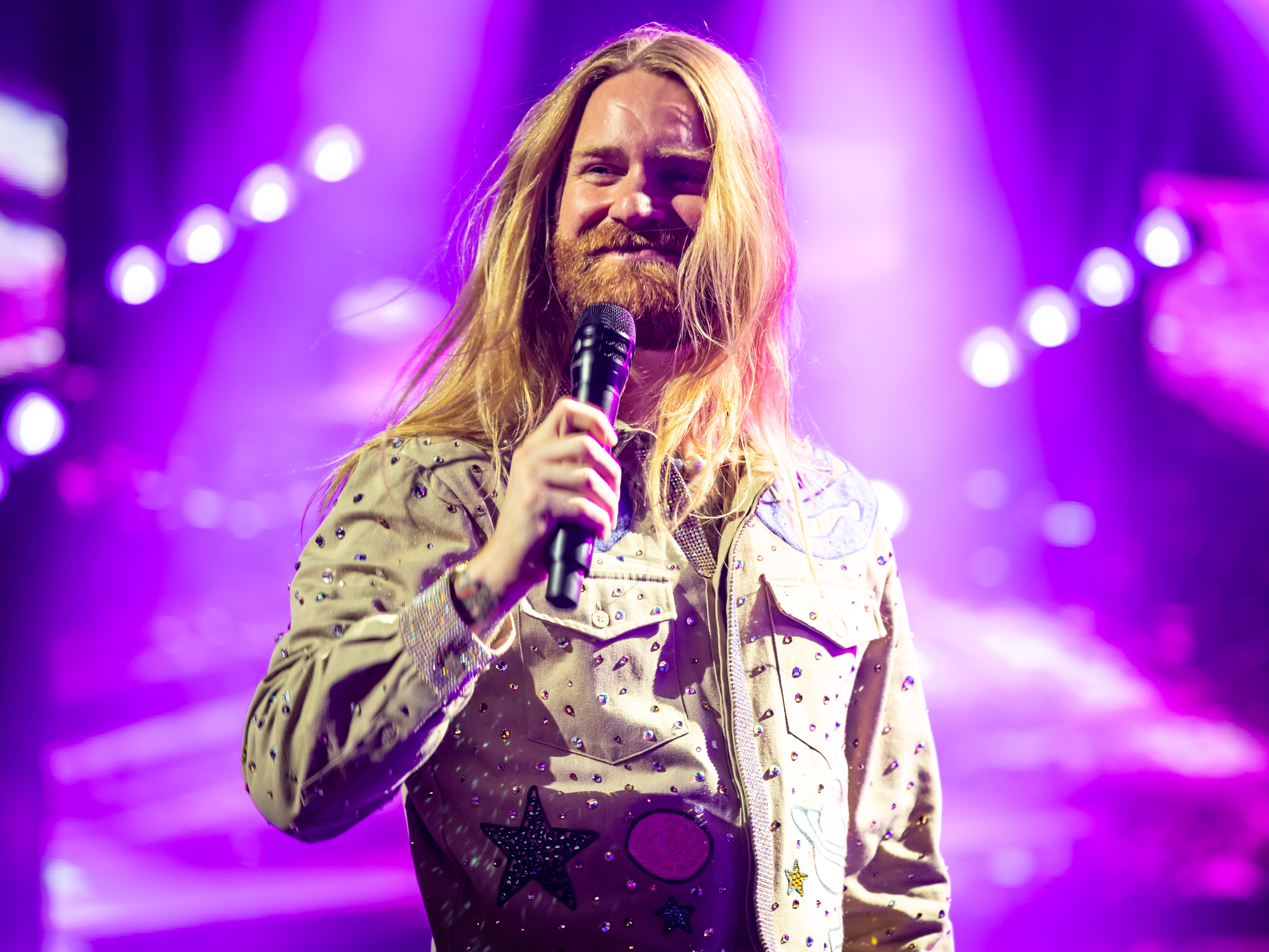
- Sam Ryder in 2022
- Studio albums: 2
- EPs: 3
- Singles: 9
- Promotional singles: 7

The discography of English singer and songwriter Sam Ryder consists of two studio albums, four extended play (EP), and nine single releases including two as collaborations. Ryder has made an appearance on three soundtracks, which includes two christmas singles. Before rising to prominence as a solo artist, in 2012 he joined the Canadian rock band Blessed by a Broken Heart and contributed to their album Feel the Power. In 2013, after his departure from the band, he joined the line up of the American hardcore rock band Close Your Eyes and released one studio album with them called Line in the Sand.

After being selected to represent the United Kingdom at the 2022 Eurovision Song Contest, his song "Space Man" became Ryder's first chart entry on the UK Singles Chart. It peaked at number two in the UK, becoming the highest-charting UK Eurovision entry since Gina G's "Ooh Aah... Just a Little Bit" in 1996. It reached the music charts in thirteen other regions and is certified Platinum by the BPI. His next singles "Somebody" reached number seventy seven in the UK while "Living Without You" a collaboration with Sigala and David Guetta peaked at number forty eight.

His debut album There's Nothing but Space, Man! (2022), topped the Scottish Albums Charts and UK Albums Chart, making him the first British male solo artist to debut at number one with their debut album since 2019. Ryder released his first Christmas single a cover of Jingle Bells (2022) and it reached number forty one in the UK becoming his fourth chart entry. In 2023, "Mountain" became his second top forty entry in his home country, while "You're Christmas to Me" (2023), became his second top five entry.

== Studio albums ==
List of studio albums, with selected details
Title	Album details	Peak chart positions			Certifications
Title	Album details	UK	SCO	SWI	Certifications
There's Nothing but Space, Man!	Released: 9 December 2022; Label: Parlophone; Formats: CD, digital download, streaming	1	1	65	BPI: Gold
Heartland	Released: 17 October 2025; Label: Artist Theory; Formats: CD, digital download, streaming	11	15	—	
"—" denotes a recording that did not chart or was not released in that territory.

== Extended plays ==
List of EPs, with selected details
Title	Details	Peak chart positions		
Title	Details	UK Digital	UK Sales	SCO
The Sun's Gonna Rise	Released: 24 September 2021; Label: Parlophone; Formats: CD, digital download, streaming	6	—	59
Apple Music Home Session	Released: 18 March 2022; Label: Parlophone; Formats: Digital download, streaming	39	40	—
Apple Music Home Session	Released: 7 October 2022; Label: Parlophone; Formats: Digital download, streaming	—	—	—
"—" denotes a recording that did not chart or was not released in that territory.

== Singles ==
List of singles, with selected peak chart positions and certifications
Title	Year	Peak chart positions									Certifications	Album
Title	Year	UK	BEL (FL)	IRE	LTU	NLD	NZ	SWE	SWI	WW	Certifications	Album
"Space Man"	2022	2	22	22	13	71	—	15	45	93	BPI: Platinum	There's Nothing but Space, Man!
"Somebody"	2022	77	—	—	—	—	—	—	—	—		There's Nothing but Space, Man!
"Living Without You" (Note: "Living Without You" also appears on Sigala's debut compilation album Every Cloud – Silver Linings.) (with Sigala and David Guetta)	2022	48	—	88	—	— (Note: "Living Without You" did not enter the Dutch Single Top 100, but peaked at number 23 on the Single Tip chart.)	— (Note: "Living Without You" did not enter the NZ Top 40 Singles Chart, but peaked at number 16 on the NZ Hot Singles Chart.)	— (Note: "Living Without You" did not enter the Swedish Singellista Chart, but peaked at number 13 on the Swedish Heatseeker Chart.)	—	—	BPI: Silver	There's Nothing but Space, Man!
"All the Way Over"	2022	— (Note: "All the Way Over" did not enter the UK Top 100 Singles Chart, but peaked at number 15 on the UK Singles Downloads Chart on 25 November 2022.)	—	—	—	—	—	—	—	—		There's Nothing but Space, Man!
"Put a Light on Me"	2023	— (Note: "Put a Light on Me" did not enter the UK Top 100 Singles Chart, but peaked at number 92 on the UK Singles Downloads Chart.)	—	—	—	—	—	—	—	—		There's Nothing but Space, Man!
"You Got the Love"	2023	—	—	—	—	—	—	—	—	—		Non-album singles
"Mountain"	2023	35	—	—	—	—	—	—	—	—		Non-album singles
"Fought & Lost" (featuring Brian May)	2023	— (Note: "Fought & Lost" did not enter the UK Top 100 Singles Chart, but peaked at number 14 on the UK Singles Downloads Chart on 2 June 2023.)	—	—	—	—	—	—	—	—		Non-album singles
"You're Christmas to Me"	2023	2	—	—	—	—	—	—	—	182	BPI: Silver	Your Christmas or Mine 2
"Back in Love" (with Kim Min-seok)	2024	—	—	—	—	—	—	—	—	—		Non-album single
"White Lies"	2025	— (Note: "White Lies" did not enter the UK Singles Chart Top 100, but debuted at number 15 on the UK Singles Downloads Chart and at number 16 on the UK Singles Sales Chart, on 28 March 2025.)	—	—	—	—	—	—	—	—		Heartland
"Oh Ok"	2025	— (Note: "Oh Ok" did not enter the UK Top 100 Singles Chart, but peaked at number 36 on the UK Singles Downloads Chart and number 38 on the UK Singles Sales Chart on 30 May 2025.)	—	—	—	—	—	—	—	—		Heartland
"Armour"	2025	—	—	—	—	—	—	—	—	—		Heartland
"The Feeling Never Went Away"	2025	—	—	—	—	—	—	—	—	—		Heartland
"Go Steady"	2025	— (Note: "Go Steady" did not enter the UK Top 100 Singles Chart, but peaked at number 14 on the UK Singles Downloads Chart and number 15 on the UK Singles Sales Chart on 22 August 2025.)	—	—	—	—	—	—	—	—		Non-album single
"Better Man"	2025	—	—	—	—	—	—	—	—	—		Heartland
"Gethsemane"	2026	— (Note: "Gethsemane" did not enter the UK Singles chart, but peaked at number 22 on the UK Singles Sales Chart.)	—	—	—	—	—	—	—	—		Non-album single
"What's the Buzz?"	2026	—	—	—	—	—	—	—	—	—		Non-album single
"—" denotes a recording that did not chart or was not released in that territory.

=== Promotional singles ===
List of promotional singles
Title	Year	Peak chart positions		Album
Title	Year	UK Digital	UK Sales	Album
"Set You Free"	2019	39	39	Non-album single
"Whirlwind"	2021	21	23	The Sun's Gonna Rise
"Tiny Riot"	2021	23	24	The Sun's Gonna Rise
"July"	2021	—	—	The Sun's Gonna Rise
"More"	2021	15	16	The Sun's Gonna Rise
"The Sun's Gonna Rise"	2021	—	—	The Sun's Gonna Rise
"Do U Want Me Baby? (Sam Ryder Acoustic)" (with Joel Corry and Billen Ted)	2023	—	—	Non-album single
"—" denotes a recording that did not chart or was not released in that territory.

== Soundtrack appearances ==
List of other charted songs
Title	Year	Peak chart positions	Album
Title	Year	UK	Album
"Jingle Bells"	2022	41	Your Christmas or Mine? (Original Motion Picture Soundtrack)
"Fought & Lost"	2023	—N/a	Ted Lasso
"You're Christmas to Me"	2023	2	Your Christmas or Mine 2 (Original Motion Picture Soundtrack)

== Songwriting credits ==
List of songwriting credits, with year released and album shown
Year	Artist	Album	Song	Notes
2022	Himself	There's Nothing But Space Man!	"Space Man"	Co-writer
2022	Himself	There's Nothing But Space Man!	"Put A Light On Me"	Co-writer
2022	Himself	There's Nothing But Space Man!	"Hello Hallelujah"	Co-writer
2022	Himself	There's Nothing But Space Man!	"Pretend It's OK”	Co-writer
2022	Himself	There's Nothing But Space Man!	"This Time"	Co-writer
2022	Himself	There's Nothing But Space Man!	"Crashing Down"	Co-writer
2022	Himself	There's Nothing But Space Man!	"Ten Tons"	Co-writer
2022	Himself	There's Nothing But Space Man!	"Ok"	Co-writer
2022	Himself	There's Nothing But Space Man!	"Deep Blue Doubt"	Co-writer
2022	Himself	There's Nothing But Space Man!	"Sun's Gonna Rise"	Co-writer
2022	Himself	There's Nothing But Space Man!	"July"	Co-writer
2022	Himself	There's Nothing But Space Man!	"More"	Co-writer
2022	Himself	There's Nothing But Space Man!	"Tiny Riot"	Co-writer
2022	Himself	There's Nothing But Space Man!	Whirlwind	Co-writer
2022	Himself	There's Nothing But Space Man!	"Somebody"	Co-writer
2022	Himself	There's Nothing But Space Man!	"All The Way Over"	Co-writer
2023	Himself	Non-album single	"Mountain"	Co-writer
2023	Himself & Brian May	Ted Lasso	"Fought & Lost"	Co-writer
2023	Himself	Your Christmas or Mine 2 (Original Motion Picture Soundtrack)	"You're Christmas to Me"	Co-writer
2023	Joel Corry	Another Friday Night	"Do U Want Me Baby?"	Co-writer

List of songwriting credits, with year released and album shown with Blessed By A Broken Heart
Year	Artist	Album	Song	Notes
2012	Blessed By A Broken Heart	Feel The Power	"Deathwish"	Co-writer
2012	Blessed By A Broken Heart	Feel The Power	"Love Nightmare"	Co-writer
2012	Blessed By A Broken Heart	Feel The Power	"Forever"	Co-writer
2012	Blessed By A Broken Heart	Feel The Power	"Holdin' Back for Nothin' ”	Co-writer
2012	Blessed By A Broken Heart	Feel The Power	"I've Got You"	Co-writer
2012	Blessed By A Broken Heart	Feel The Power	"Scream It Like You Mean It"	Co-writer
2012	Blessed By A Broken Heart	Feel The Power	"Skate or Die"	Co-writer
2012	Blessed By A Broken Heart	Feel The Power	"Innocent Blood"	Co-writer
2012	Blessed By A Broken Heart	Feel The Power	"Sleepless Nights"	Co-writer

List of songwriting credits, with year released and album shown with Close Your Eyes
Year	Artist	Album	Song	Notes
2013	Close Your Eyes	Line In The Sand	"Deus Ex Machina"	Co-writer
2013	Close Your Eyes	Line In The Sand	"Burdened By Hope"	Co-writer
2013	Close Your Eyes	Line In The Sand	"Days Of Youth"	Co-writer
2013	Close Your Eyes	Line In The Sand	"Line In The Sand"	Co-writer
2013	Close Your Eyes	Line In The Sand	"Frame And Glass"	Co-writer
2013	Close Your Eyes	Line In The Sand	"Sleeping Giant "	Co-writer
2013	Close Your Eyes	Line In The Sand	"Kings Of John Payne"	Co-writer
2013	Close Your Eyes	Line In The Sand	"No Borders!"	Co-writer
2013	Close Your Eyes	Line In The Sand	"The End"	Co-writer
2013	Close Your Eyes	Line In The Sand	"Higher Than My Station"	Co-writer
2013	Close Your Eyes	Line In The Sand	"Skeletons"	Co-writer
2013	Close Your Eyes	Line In The Sand	"Trends and Phases"	Co-writer
2013	Close Your Eyes	Line In The Sand	"Glory"	Co-writer
2013	Close Your Eyes	Line In The Sand	"My Way Home"	Co-writer
2013	Close Your Eyes	Line In The Sand	"Follow The Sun"	Co-writer

== Producing credits ==
List of producing credits, with year released and album shown
Year	Artist	Album	Song
2023	Himself	Non-album single	"Mountain"

== Composing credits ==
List of composing credits, with year released and album shown
Year	Artist	Album	Song
2023	Himself	Your Christmas or Mine 2 (Original Motion Picture Soundtrack)	"You're Christmas To Me"
