= Your Christmas =

Your Christmas has multiple meanings:

- Your Christmas or Mine?, a 2022 movie
- A single by Tokio Hotel

== See also ==
- You're Christmas to Me
