= We Will Overcome =

We Will Overcome may refer to:

- We Will Overcome (song), a song by Thursday, from the album A City by the Light Divided
- We Will Overcome (album), a 2010 album by Close Your Eyes

== See also ==
- "We Shall Overcome", a protest song
