= Pedal to the Metal =

Pedal to the Metal may refer to:

- Pedal to the Metal (Impellitteri album), 2004
- Pedal to the Metal (Blessed by a Broken Heart album), 2008
- Put the pedal to the metal, or "floor it", an idiom meaning "to accelerate to top speed" or "move at top speed"
