= All Is Fair in Love and War (album) =

Studio album by Blessed by a Broken Heart
- Released: May 26, 2005
- Recorded: 2004
- Genre: Metalcore
- Length: 47:40
- Label: Blood and Ink

Blessed by a Broken Heart chronology
All Is Fair in Love and War (2005)	Pedal to the Metal (2008)

Professional ratings
Review scores
Source	Rating
AllMusic	2.5/5 stars
Punk News	3/5 stars

All Is Fair in Love and War is the debut album by Canadian metalcore band Blessed by a Broken Heart.

== Track listing ==
All tracks are written by Blessed by a Broken Heart.

No.	Title	Length
1.	"Action"	1:26
2.	"Another Day, Another War"	3:47
3.	"That Knife Ain't for Butter"	3:23
4.	"The Devil is the Don"	4:15
5.	"Sawing My Head Off"	4:55
6.	"Mic Skillz"	3:14
7.	"Somekind of Wonderful"	4:44
8.	"OMG!"	3:47
9.	"Courting Mary" (ends at 4:17; untitled hidden track begins after 10:04 of silence)	18:09

== Personnel ==
- Hugh Charron – lead vocals
- Robbie Hart – lead guitar, backing vocals
- Tyler Hoare – rhythm guitar, backing vocals
- Simon Foxx – keyboards, additional guitar
- Frank "Da Bird" – drums
- Joel Sauve – bass
