= Line in the Sand (Close Your Eyes album) =

Studio album by Close Your Eyes
- Released: October 29, 2013
- Genre: Hardcore punk; post-hardcore; pop punk
- Length: 49:26
- Label: Victory
- Producer: Cameron Webb

Close Your Eyes chronology
Empty Hands and Heavy Hearts (2011)	Line in the Sand (2013)

Singles from Line in the Sand
- 1. "Frame and Glass" / "The End" Released: October 14, 2013

Professional ratings
Review scores
Source	Rating
Alternative Press	2.5/5 stars
Indie Vision Music	4/5 stars
Jesusfreakhideout	4.5/5 stars
Under the Gun Review	6.5/10 stars
HM Magazine	4/5 stars

Line in the Sand is the third and final full-length album by Texas melodic hardcore band Close Your Eyes, released on October 29, 2013, through Victory Records. It is the band's only album featuring lead vocalist Sam Robinson, formerly of Blessed by a Broken Heart.

== Track listing ==
No.	Title	Length
1.	"Deus Ex Machina"	1:15
2.	"Burdened by Hope"	2:34
3.	"Days of Youth"	2:52
4.	"Line in the Sand"	3:10
5.	"Frame and Glass"	3:56
6.	"Sleeping Giant" (feat. Tommy Green)	3:15
7.	"Kings of John Payne"	4:05
8.	"No Borders!"	3:36
9.	"The End" (feat. Zoli)	4:14
10.	"Higher Than My Station"	3:39
11.	"Skeletons"	1:54
12.	"Trends and Phases"	4:40
13.	"Glory"	3:39
14.	"My Way Home"	5:17
15.	"Follow the Sun"	1:20
Total length:		49:26

== Personnel ==
- Sam Robinson – lead vocals
- Brett Callaway – guitar, backing vocals
- Andrew Rodriguez – guitar, engineering
- Sonny Vega – bass, backing vocals
- Jordan Hatfield – drums

Additional personnel

- Tommy Green – guest vocals on track 6
- Zoli Téglás – guest vocals on track 9
- Erin Nicole Ellithorpe – guest vocals
- Cameron Webb – Record producer, engineer
