= Empty Hands and Heavy Hearts =

Studio album by Close Your Eyes
- Released: October 24, 2011
- Genres: Hardcore punk, post-hardcore, pop punk
- Length: 44:53
- Label: Victory
- Producer: Cameron Webb

Close Your Eyes chronology
We Will Overcome (2010)	Empty Hands and Heavy Hearts (2011)	Line in the Sand (2013)

Singles from Empty Hands and Heavy Hearts
- 1. "Valleys" Released: October 18, 2011; 2. "Keep the Lights On" Released: November 28, 2011; 3. "Carry You" Released: January 30, 2012; 4. "Erie" Released: February 15, 2012

Professional ratings
Review scores
Source	Rating
Absolute Punk	(75%)
AllMusic	3/5 stars
Jesus Freak Hideout	4/5 stars

Empty Hands and Heavy Hearts is the second full-length album by Texas melodic hardcore band Close Your Eyes, released on October 24, 2011, through Victory Records. It is the band's last album to feature lead vocalist Shane Raymond.

== Background ==
Empty Hands and Heavy Hearts is the band's only album to feature drummer Tim Friesen after the departure of former drummer David Fidler.

The album's first single, "Valleys," was released on October 18, 2011. A music video was released for the song on October 20.

"Valleys" is also the theme song for Total Nonstop Action Wrestling's 2011 Turning Point pay-per-view. An edited music video centered on Jeff Hardy's worked shoot redemption storyline has been released through TNA's YouTube account.

== Track listing ==
No.	Title	Length
1.	"Hope Slips Away (The World Is Ours to Change)"	3:49
2.	"Empty Hands"	4:08
3.	"Erie"	2:38
4.	"Valleys"	3:24
5.	"Injustice"	2:21
6.	"Paper Thin"	3:26
7.	"Wormwood"	4:50
8.	"Keep the Lights On"	3:02
9.	"Carry You"	3:26
10.	"Wolves" (featuring Jonathan Vigil of The Ghost Inside)	4:02
11.	"Scars"	3:32
12.	"Heavy Hearts"	5:19
Total length:		44:53

== Personnel ==
- Shane Raymond - lead vocals
- Brett Callaway - guitar, backing vocals
- Andrew Rodriguez - guitar
- Sonny Vega - bass, backing vocals
- Tim Friesen - drums, percussion

Production

- Cameron Webb - producer, mixer
