= Sam Ryder =

English singer, songwriter and social media personality (born 1989)

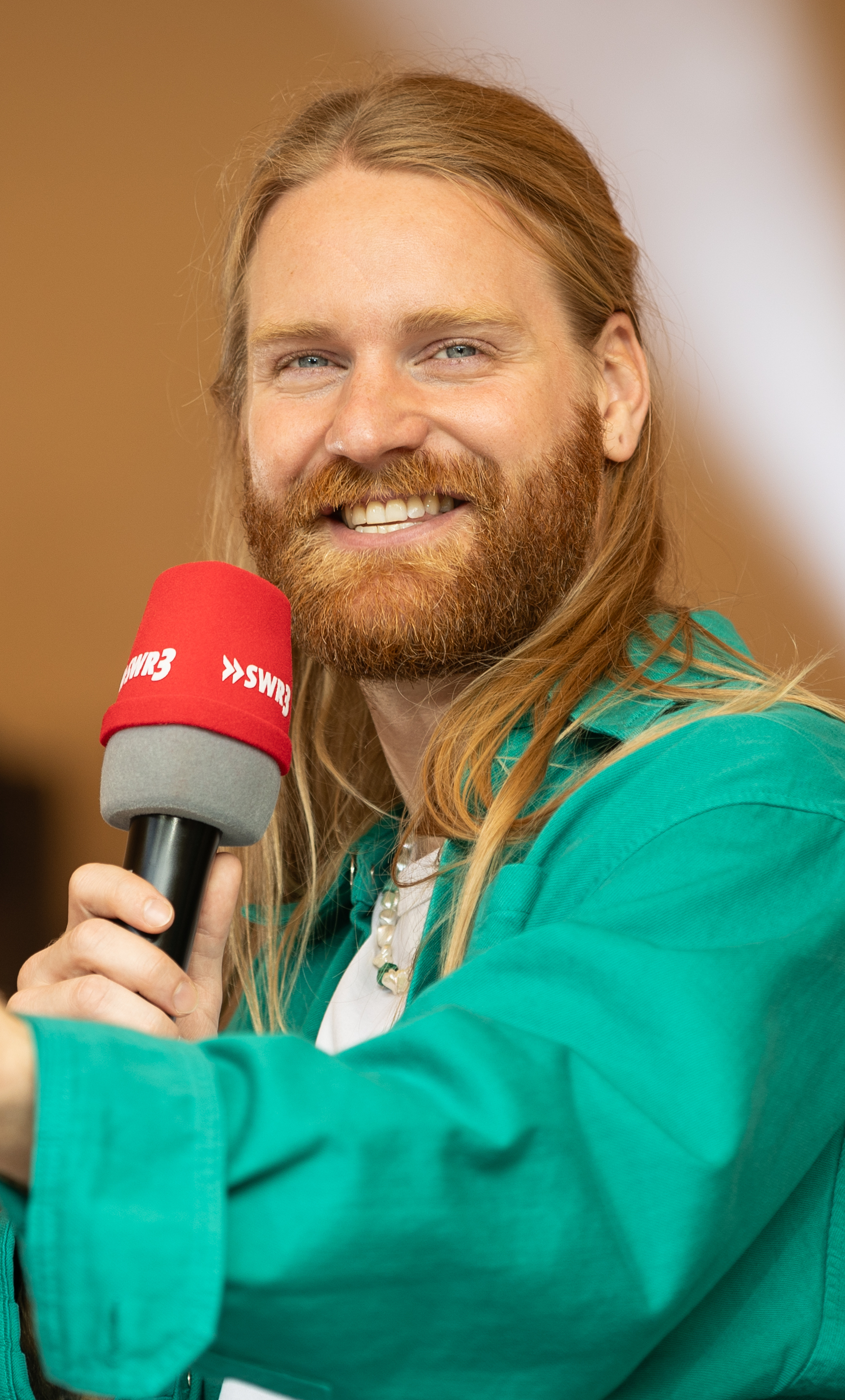
- Ryder in 2022

Background information
- Born: Sam Ryder Robinson; 25 June 1989 (age 37); Maldon, Essex, England
- Genres: Pop; pop rock; metalcore; glam metal; hard rock; indie pop
- Occupations: Singer; songwriter; social media personality
- Instruments: Vocals; guitar
- Years active: 2009–present
- Labels: Parlophone; F04; Warner
- Formerly of: The Morning After; Blessed by a Broken Heart; Close Your Eyes
- Website: sam-ryder.com

TikTok information
- Page: Sam Ryder
- Followers: 14.4 million
- Last updated: 24 October 2025

Sam Ryder Robinson (born 25 June 1989) is an English singer, songwriter, producer, actor, composer and social media personality. He rose to prominence in 2020 after posting music covers on TikTok during the first UK lockdown of the COVID-19 pandemic, and signed to Parlophone Records before parting ways with them in 2023. His music has since incorporated various genres including rock, pop, alternative rock, and metalcore, while his vocal range, and use of vibrato and falsetto, have garnered critical acclaim.

Ryder's breakthrough came after he represented the United Kingdom in the Eurovision Song Contest 2022 with "Space Man". He became the highest scoring UK entrant with 466 points, won the jury vote and came in second place in the contest. He became the first British act to win a Marcel Bezençon Award, and scored the UK its best result since 1998 and its first top three result since 2002. Space Man peaked at number two on the UK Singles Chart, becoming the highest-charting UK Eurovision entry since 1996. His participation has been credited for helping to change how the British public and press view the contest. It was followed by the release of his debut album, There's Nothing but Space, Man! (2022), which debuted atop of the UK Albums Chart. His second album, Heartland, was released on 17 October 2025.

In 2023 he was nominated for Best New Artist at the Brit Awards, becoming the first Eurovision act to be nominated in this category. He has released a string of singles, including the Emmy nominated song "Fought & Lost" featuring Brian May, "Mountain" and "You're Christmas to Me", which also peaked at number two in the UK. His other accolades include five TikTok awards, a Big Top 40 award, and a Hollywood Music in Media Award. He has been nominated for a Los 40 Music Award, Global Award, Edinburgh International Television Festival and an MTV Video Music Award.

== Early life ==
Sam Ryder Robinson was born on 25 June 1989 in Maldon, Essex, the youngest child of Keith Robinson, a carpenter, and his wife, Geraldine (née Costelloe), a dental assistant from Hackney, London. He has two sisters. Ryder was raised in Chelmsford, Essex and attended the local St John Payne Catholic School. His first job was delivering papers for The Essex Chronicle as a child.

Ryder was inspired to pursue a career in music after seeing the Canadian rock band Sum 41 in concert when he was 11. Ryder is a "big fan" of Eurovision and cites Finnish rock band Lordi as being the inspiration for him learning how to play guitar, after the rock band won the Eurovision Song Contest 2006.

== Career ==
=== 2006–2019: Beginnings ===
Ryder made his debut as a singer and guitarist at age 16 when he co-founded the band The Morning After, with whom he released two studio albums; You Can't Hurt Steel (2009) and Legacy (2011). Both albums were released under independent label Rising Records. During the Legacy era, manager Josh Keating (aka JK Mizu) challenged Rising Records founder Mark Daghorn over the band's lack of royalty payments. Shortly after, Daghorn abrubtly closed Rising Records and fled to Barbados leaving The Morning After and many other bands in the dark.

Following The Morning After's split, he joined as a guitarist and backing vocalist for the Canadian Rock band Blessed by a Broken Heart and contributed to their album Feel the Power. After briefly becoming their lead vocalist following the album's release, he parted ways with the band in 2013 and auditioned to become the new lead vocalist for the American Rock band Close Your Eyes, and contributed to their album Line in the Sand and left in 2014.

After his departure from Close Your Eyes, Ryder returned to Britain and spent time working in construction with his father, including helping to build the Wembley Stadium. In 2016, Ryder recorded an album with producer Bryan Wilson in Nashville, Tennessee, although it was never released. He later opened up a vegan café with his partner in Coggeshall, England, before its closure in 2019. He was a wedding singer in the south-east of England until the COVID-19 pandemic.

=== 2020–2022: TikTok and Eurovision ===
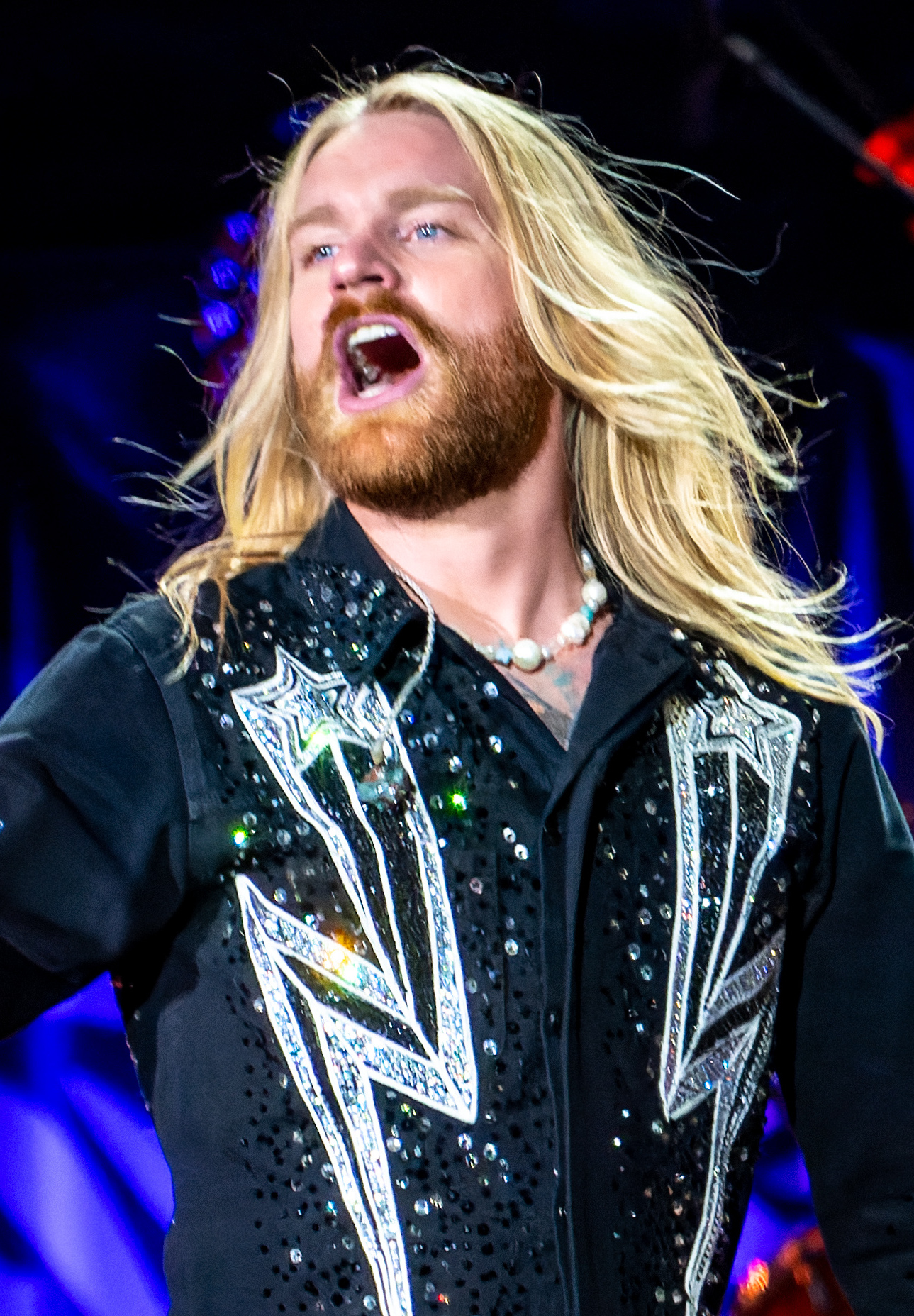
Ryder performing at Wembley Stadium, 2022

Ryder rose to prominence through TikTok where, starting with the first lockdown during the COVID-19 pandemic in March 2020, he began posting his music covers. He caught the attention of musicians such as Elton John, Sia, Justin Bieber, and Alicia Keys. By the end of the same year, he was named the most- followed UK artist on the platform. He later signed a record contract with Parlophone. In 2021, he released his debut EP, The Sun's Gonna Rise, which has accumulated over 100 million global streams. It was followed up with a sold-out tour.

Ryder wrote "Space Man" during the pandemic, and in January 2022, the song was sent to TaP Music and the BBC. In the same month, he accepted their offer to represent the country in the contest. On 10 March 2022, he was announced as the UK representative for the Eurovision Song Contest 2022 with "Space Man". Ryder toured Europe between March and May 2022 to promote his entry. In an interview for Sky News, he spoke about the injury he had sustained in Madrid during his tour after crashing into a metal bar.

On 12 May 2022, the BBC aired a documentary on BBC iPlayer and YouTube which detailed Ryder's journey to Eurovision. At the Eurovision final in Turin, Italy, he finished in second place with 466 points, becoming the highest-scoring UK Eurovision entrant. He won the jury vote and scored the UK its best result since 1998 and its first top three since 2002. Ryder also won a Marcel Bezençon Press Award, becoming the first UK act to win a Bezençon Award. After the contest, "Space Man" peaked at number two on the UK Singles Chart, becoming the highest-charting UK Eurovision entry since Gina G's "Ooh Aah... Just a Little Bit" in 1996.

In June 2022, Ryder performed "Space Man" at the Queen's Platinum Jubilee concert, Platinum Party at the Palace. In July 2022, he performed the British national anthem at the British Grand Prix at Silverstone. On 19 August, he released his follow-up single, "Somebody", which reached number 77 on the UK Singles Chart. The music video for the song, released the same day, was shot in Šimanovci on the set of Serbian reality show Zadruga.

On 2 September 2022, Ryder released "Living Without You", a collaboration with Sigala and David Guetta. On 3 September, he performed Queen's "Somebody to Love" along with Queen members Brian May and Roger Taylor, at a tribute concert for Taylor Hawkins at London's Wembley Stadium. On 26 September 2022, he performed a headline show at Lafayette in London for National Album Day, in partnership with the charity War Child.

Between October and November 2022, Ryder embarked on his first European tour which spanned 19 dates, beginning in Cologne, Germany on 12 October and concluding in London, United Kingdom on 24 November. He is scheduled to embark on his UK and Ireland tour spanning 14 dates, beginning 17 March 2023 in Belfast and concluding on 5 April 2023 in Brighton. On 13 October 2022, Ryder opened the National Television Awards. "All the Way Over" was released on 4 November 2022, as the next single from his forthcoming debut album.

=== 2022–2024: There's Nothing but Space, Man! ===
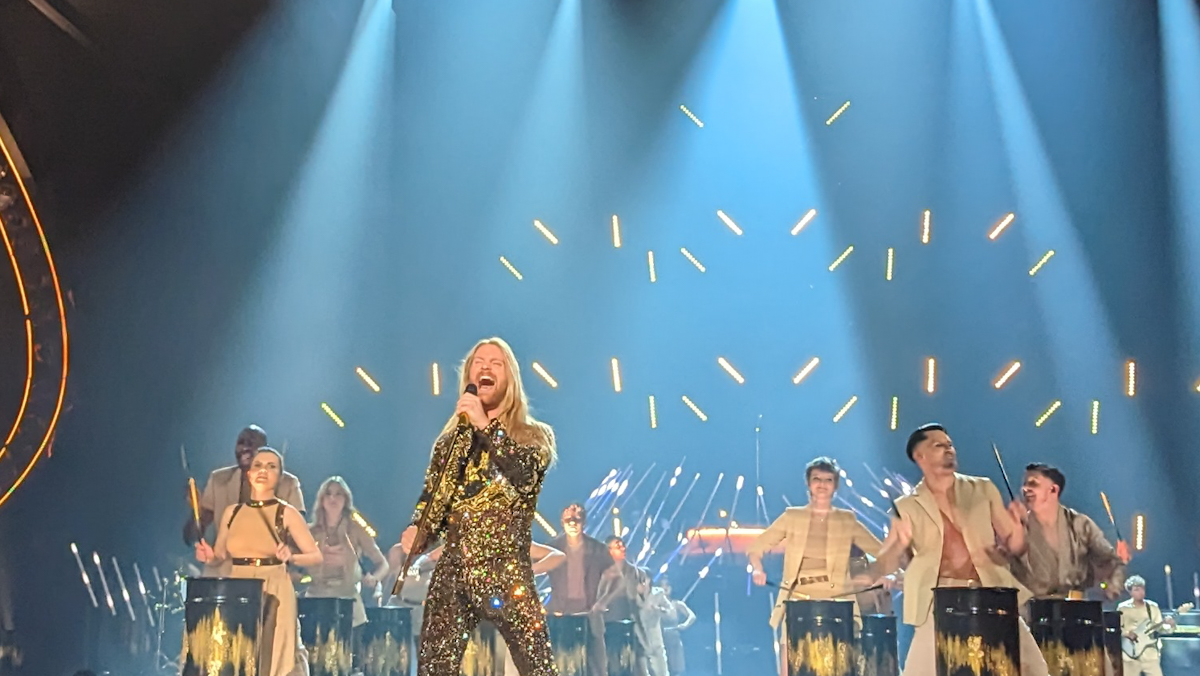
Ryder performing as the Interval Act at the Eurovision Song Contest 2023

On 9 December 2022, his debut studio album There's Nothing but Space, Man! was released. The album debuted atop of the UK Albums Chart, making Ryder the first British male solo artist to debut at number one with their first record in over three years, and the first solo artist to debut at number one with their first full-length release since Olivia Rodrigo's Sour (2021). In the same month, Ryder also performed at the Royal Variety Show. On 22 November, Ryder announced a special New Year's Eve show, which aired on BBC One and iPlayer, titled Sam Ryder Rocks New Year's Eve, on 31 December 2022 and 1 January 2023. He was joined by guest musicians, including Melanie C, Sigrid and Justin Hawkins.

In January 2023, Ryder was nominated for Best New Artist at the 2023 Brit Awards, becoming the first Eurovision act to be nominated in this category. In the same month he voiced the character of Brian in Messy Goes to OKIDO, a British television series aired on CBeebies. In February 2023, Ryder performed a cover version of "I'm Good (Blue)" alongside Guetta at the Brit Awards 2023. In March 2023, he released a cover version of "You Got the Love" in partnership with Matalan for its spring brand campaign. In the same month, Ryder's jumpsuit that he wore during his Eurovision performance in 2022 was displayed in Liverpool, ahead of the city hosting the 2023 contest in May. He was also nominated for the Rising Star award at the 2023 Global Awards. In April, Ryder in his first brand collaboration on a TV advert was featured in a TV and social campaign with Vodafone. He was announced as the company's new ambassador.

On 12 May 2023, Ryder released his new single "Mountain" for a global brand campaign with Ottobock, and performed it at the Eurovision Song Contest 2023 with some of their disabled performers who joined him on stage. It peaked at number 35 on the UK Singles Chart. On 24 May 2023, he released a collaboration with Brian May, called "Fought & Lost" for the drama series Ted Lasso. He performed the song with Hannah Waddingham (who was also one of the presenters of the 2023 Eurovision contest) at the Grammy Museum in Los Angeles. In July, was nominated for his first Primetime Emmy Award for Outstanding Original Music and Lyrics.

In August, Ryder was announced as a nominee for the MTV Video Music Awards. His song 'All the Way Over' was nominated for Push Performance of the Year category. In September, he had parted ways with his record label of 3 years, Parlophone, following the completion of his one-album deal. In November, Ryder won a Hollywood Music in Media Award for his song "Fought & Lost." That same month he released a brand new single called "You're Christmas to Me" for the Your Christmas or Mine 2 soundtrack and it peaked at number two on the UK Singles Chart, becoming the Christmas number two after being beaten to the top spot by "Last Christmas" by Wham!.

=== 2024–present: Heartland and independent artist ===
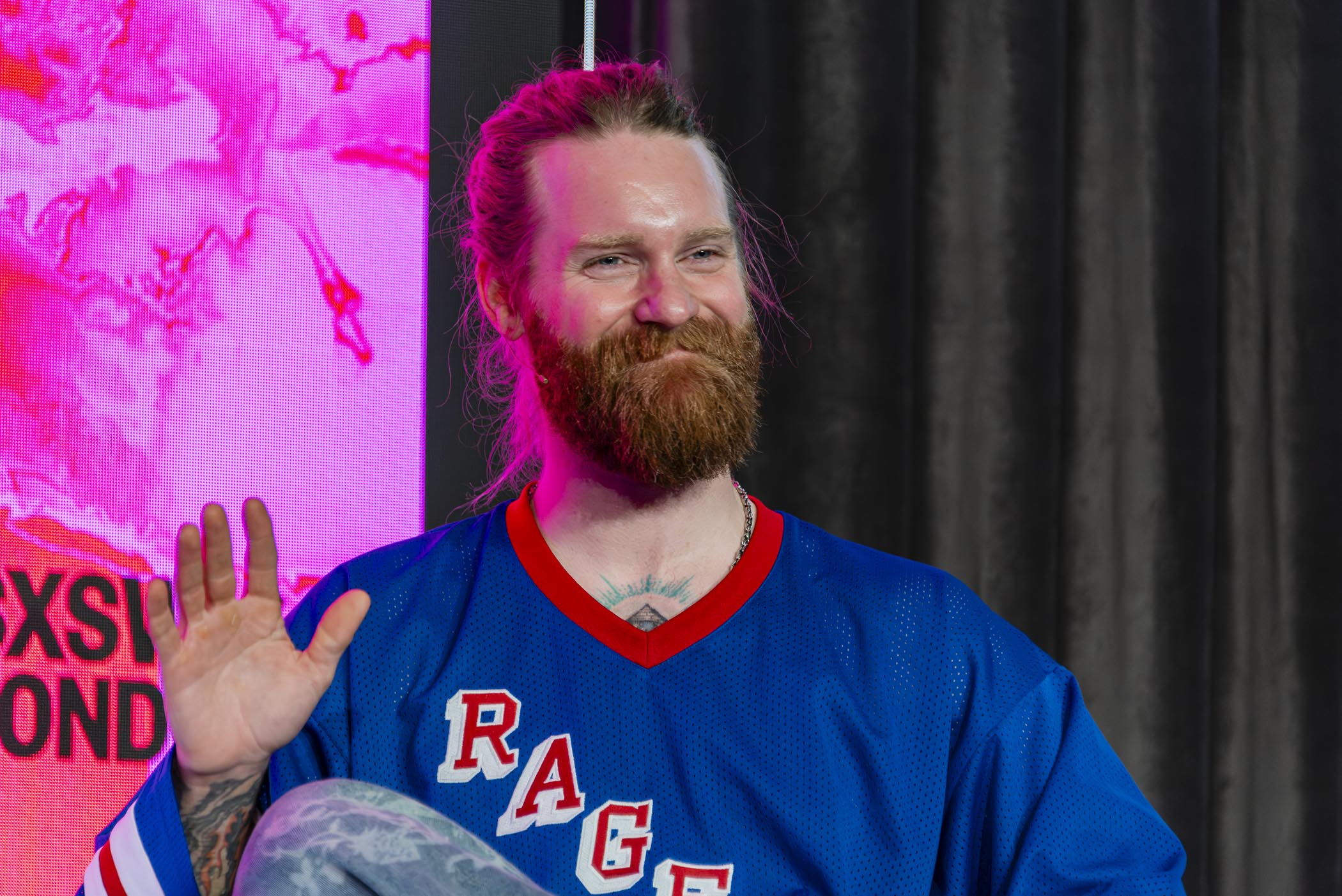
Ryder at SXSW London in June 2025.

In January 2024, Ryder announced that he had begun work on his upcoming second studio album. He also released a new single in collaboration with Korean actor and singer Kim Min-seok called "Back in Love". The song topped the Korean chart, Melon Music. In January 2025, Ryder was nominated for his second consecutive Brit Award for his song "You're Christmas to Me". On 21 March 2025 he released his new single "White Lies". On his new music, Ryder stated, "I've never felt so sure of who I am as artist and I'm so proud of this new music, I can't wait for you all to hear it". On 29 June 2025 he played the Avalon stage at Glastonbury Festival On 24 June, Ryder released his EP, OH OK, after moving to Nashville to record the album. He hosted "Music On Stage 2025", a global music competition for TikTok, in September 2025.

Ryder's second studio album Heartland was released on 17 October 2025, and debuted at number 11 on the UK Albums Chart a week later. In support of the album, Ryder embarked on a UK tour, from 21 October in Liverpool, ending with a 6 November 2025 concert at Wembley Arena.

On 7 November 2025, it was announced that Ryder will star as Jesus in Tim Rice and Andrew Lloyd Webber's Jesus Christ Superstar at the London Palladium from 20 June to 5 September 2026, making his West End debut. Following the Palladium run, the production will run at Theatre Royal, Drury Lane with Ryder reprising the role of Jesus, followed by a UK and Ireland tour beginning on 11 February 2027 at the Palace Theatre, Manchester. Two songs from the musical "Gethsemane" and "What's the Buzz?" were released as singles.

== Personal life ==
Ryder started making music at age 13 and has spent most of his adult life touring, writing, and performing for other bands. He once resided in Hawaii. In 2018, he was involved in a surfing accident, which pushed him to put more effort into his music career. He is a vegan and once owned a vegan café in Coggeshall, England. He likes to surf the coast of Great Britain in his free time, meditate, travel, snowboard, drive around race tracks and skate.

Ryder is in a long-term relationship with his partner Lois Gaskin-Barber. He cites David Bowie, Elton John, Freddie Mercury, and Queen among his music influences. Ryder believes in aliens, once wanted to pursue a career as an astronaut, and claims to have seen a UFO while in Hawaii as a child.

== Discography ==
- There's Nothing but Space, Man! (2022)
- Heartland (2025)

== Filmography ==
=== TV ===
Year	Title	Notes	Ref.
2022	Celebrity Gogglebox	Alongside Scott Mills	
2022	Sam Ryder Rocks New Year's Eve	Alongside Melanie C, Sigrid, Justin Hawkins and the House Gospel Choir	
2023	Comic Relief	Alongside Graham Norton and Lulu	
2026	Taskmaster	Alongside Big Zuu, Jill Scott, Rose Ayling-Ellis, and Susie Dent	
2026	Your Song	Judge	
2026	Celebrity Race Across The World	Contestant	

=== Theatre ===
Year	Title	Role	Venue
2026	Jesus Christ Superstar	Jesus Christ	London Palladium
2026-2027	Jesus Christ Superstar	Jesus Christ	Theatre Royal, Drury Lane
2027	Jesus Christ Superstar	Jesus Christ	UK and Ireland tour

== Awards and achievements ==
Award	Year	Nominee(s)	Category	Result	Ref.
Hollywood Music in Media Awards	2023	"Fought & Lost"	Best Original Song - TV Show/Mini Series	Won	
Brit Awards	2023	Himself	Best New Artist	Nominated	
Edinburgh International Television Festival	2022	"Space Man"	TV Moment of the Year	Nominated	
Primetime Emmy Awards	2023	"Fought & Lost"	Outstanding Original Music and Lyrics	Nominated	
Global Awards	2023	Himself	Rising Star	Nominated	
LOS40 Music Awards	2022	Himself	Best International New Act	Nominated	
MTV Video Music Awards	2023	"All the Way Over"	Push Performance of the Year	Nominated	
Marcel Bezençon Awards	2022	Himself	Press Award	Won	
Music Week Awards	2023	Himself	Artist Marketing Campaign	Nominated	
Music Week Awards	2023	Himself	PR Campaign	Nominated	
The TikTok Awards	2020	Himself	Most Viewed British Artist	Won	
The TikTok Awards	2020	Himself	Most Followed British Artist	Won	
The TikTok Awards	2021	Himself	Most Followed British Artist	Won	
The TikTok Awards	2022	Himself	Most Followed British Artist	Won	
The TikTok Awards	2022	Himself	Breakthrough Artist of the Year	Won	
ICYMI Entertainment Awards	2023	"Himself"	Best Live Act	Nominated	
Brit Awards	2025	"You're Christmas to Me"	Song of the Year	Nominated	

Preceded by James Newman with "Embers"	United Kingdom in the Eurovision Song Contest; 2022	Succeeded by Mae Muller with "I Wrote a Song"
