= Pedal to the Metal (Blessed by a Broken Heart album) =

2008 studio album by Blessed by a Broken Heart

Studio album by Blessed by a Broken Heart
- Released: September 2, 2008
- Recorded: April–May 2007
- Genres: Christian metal, metalcore, glam metal
- Length: 49:35
- Label: Century Media
- Producers: Garth Richardson, Ben Kaplan

Blessed by a Broken Heart chronology
| All Is Fair in Love and War (2005) | Pedal to the Metal (2008) | Feel the Power (2012) |

Professional ratings
Review scores
| Source | Rating |
|---|---|
| AllMusic | 1.5/5 stars |
| Sea of Tranquility | 2.5/5 stars |

Pedal to the Metal is the second album by glam metal and metalcore band Blessed by a Broken Heart and was released on August 18, 2008 in Europe and September 2, 2008 in the US through Century Media. By the time of its release, original rhythm guitarist Robbie Hart and additional guitarist/keyboardist Simon Foxx had been kicked out of the band.

Production for the album began in April 2007 and finished a month later in May.

== Track listing ==
All tracks are written by Blessed by a Broken Heart.

| No. | Title | Length |
|---|---|---|
| 1. | "Intro" | 1:55 |
| 2. | "She Wolf" | 5:53 |
| 3. | "Show Me What You Got" | 4:18 |
| 4. | "Move Your Body" | 3:32 |
| 5. | "She Is Dangerous" | 3:51 |
| 6. | "To Be Young" | 4:16 |
| 7. | "Doin' It" | 3:34 |
| 8. | "Blood On Your Hands" | 4:41 |
| 9. | "Don't Stop" | 3:45 |
| 10. | "Carry On" | 4:56 |
| 11. | "Ride Into the Night" | 4:01 |

Japan bonus tracks
| No. | Title | Length |
|---|---|---|
| 12. | "Side by Side" | 6:32 |
| 13. | "License to Sin" | 4:38 |

== Personnel ==
- Tony Gambino – lead vocals
- Sean "Shred" Maier – lead guitar
- Robbie Hart – rhythm guitar, backing vocals
- Tyler Hoare – bass, backing vocals
- Simon Foxx – keyboard, additional guitar
- Frank "Da Bird" Shooflar – drums
