= You're Christmas to Me =

Single by Sam Ryder
- Released: 7 November 2023
- Recorded: 2023
- Genre: Christmas
- Length: 3:34
- Label: F04; Warner
- Songwriters: Sam Ryder; Max Wolfgang; Tom Howe
- Producer: The Nocturns

Sam Ryder singles chronology
"Fought & Lost" (2023)	"You're Christmas to Me" (2023)

"You're Christmas to Me" is a Christmas single by British singer-songwriter Sam Ryder. It was released exclusively via Amazon Music on 7 November 2023, as part of the Amazon Music Originals series. An original track created for the British comedy film Your Christmas or Mine 2, it marks his second Christmas release following his cover of "Jingle Bells" in 2022. It marked Ryder's first record as an independent artist after parting ways with Parlophone Records. The song became a contender for the Christmas number-one slot on the UK Singles Chart and later peaked at number two. It is currently his highest-charting single to date, alongside "Space Man" (2022).

== Background and release ==
The song was released exclusively on 7 November 2023 through Amazon Music. It is to be featured as part of the British Amazon Prime film Your Christmas or Mine 2. A music video is scheduled to be released during the run up to Christmas.

In an interview for Official Charts Company, Ryder revealed that he was approached by Amazon Music and wrote the track alongside Max Wolfgang in August 2023. He further added how the single takes some inspiration from Darlene Love "All Alone on Christmas". Ryder described it as a late eighties and early nineties influenced track with saxophones and big New York City swing drums with inspiration from Bruce Springsteen, E Street Band, and elements of The Darkness by incorporating guitars.

== Chart performance ==
“Christmas Number 2, isn’t that bonkers? When we wrote this song, in the blazing month of August, we didn’t even expect it to chart. But here we are, in a Mariah Carey and WHAM! sandwich, and we’re the filling. I’m stoked! I hope this has given some vigour and some fire to upcoming grass roots and indie artists. You can do it – you’ve just got to set your heart ablaze and get out there. Believe, have faith.

— Sam Ryder, 2023 Christmas number two, to the Official Charts Company

The song debuted at number 88 on the UK Singles Chart, becoming Ryder's sixth chart entry in his home country. On 1 December 2023, "You're Christmas To Me" reached a new peak of number 12, becoming his third top forty entry. It topped the Official Trending Chart for three consecutive weeks and reached number 2 on both the UK Single Sales, UK Singles Downloads Charts and number 3 on the UK Physical Singles Chart. It later reached a new peak of number 10, becoming Ryder's second top ten entry on the charts.

"You're Christmas To me" became a contender for the Christmas number-one spot and reached number 2. It became Ryder's second top five entry in the UK and is his highest-charting single to date alongside Space Man (2022), which also peaked at number 2.

== Promotion ==
Ryder performed the song for the first time at Virgin Radio UK. He also gave two exclusive performances at two consecutive nights at the 2023 Jingle Bell Ball. He also embarked on a promotional trip to promote the song, concluding performing on Strictly Come Dancing Christmas Special, The One Show, and BBC Live Lounge.

== Charts ==
Chart performance for "You're Christmas to Me"
Chart (2023–2024)	Peak position
Global 200 (Billboard)	182
UK Singles (OCC)	2

== Certifications ==
Certifications for "You're Christmas To Me"
Region	Certification	Certified units/sales
United Kingdom (BPI)	Silver	200,000^{‡}
^{‡} Sales+streaming figures based on certification alone.

== Awards and nominations ==
Year	Award ceremony	Category	Nominee(s)/work(s)	Result	Ref.
2025	Brit Awards	Song of the Year	"You're Christmas To Me"	Nominated	
