= Mountain (Sam Ryder song) =

Single by Sam Ryder
- Released: 12 May 2023
- Genre: Pop
- Length: 2:49
- Label: Parlophone
- Songwriter: Sam Ryder
- Producers: Sam Ryder; Jimbo Barry; Lewis Allen

Sam Ryder singles chronology
"You Got the Love" (2023)	"Mountain" (2023)	"Fought & Lost" (2023)

"Mountain" is a song by English singer and songwriter Sam Ryder. It was released on 12 May 2023 through Parlophone Records. It was written and co-produced by Ryder along with Jimbo Barry and Lewis Allen. Lyrically about perseverance and overcoming and conquering life obstacles, it received its first televised performance at the final of the Eurovision Song Contest 2023 in Liverpool. The song peaked at number 35 on the UK Singles Chart, becoming Ryder's second top 40 entry in his home country. The song was produced for a global brand campaign with Ottobock, and some of their disabled performers joined Ryder onstage at Eurovision.

== Background release ==
Ryder first performed "Mountain" across his European tour and teased the release date through his social media pages. In April 2023, Ryder was announced as one of the interval acts for the grand final of the Eurovision Song Contest. In May, he confirmed in an interview with Graham Norton, at Virgin Radio that he will perform his new track "Mountain" at the Grand Final. The song was available to purchase in bundles and was released as a single on 12 May 2023.

It was lyrically inspired by fans that Ryder had met through on his tour and how they overcame obstacles in their lives. "We often say that things in our lives are like mountains, you know, like with something we've got to overcome and hop over and conquer for life to get great again. But this song is flipping that narrative and saying that you are the mountain and down in the valley below is all that you've overcome.”

— Ryder talking about his new single on Virgin Radio UK.

== Production and composition ==
"Mountain" was written by Sam Ryder, who produced the track alongside Lewis Allen and Jimbo Barry. Its lyrics address perseverance and overcoming life obstacles. It runs for a total of 2 minutes and 49 seconds.

== Promotion ==
Ryder performed the song as an interval act in the final of the Eurovision Song Contest 2023 in Liverpool. It featured a guest appearance by Roger Taylor of rock band Queen on drums.

== Charts ==
Chart performance for "Mountain"
Chart (2023)	Peak position
South Korea BGM (Circle)	111
UK Singles (OCC)	35
UK Singles Downloads (OCC)	2
UK Singles Sales (OCC)	1
