= Close Your Eyes (band) =

American melodic hardcore band

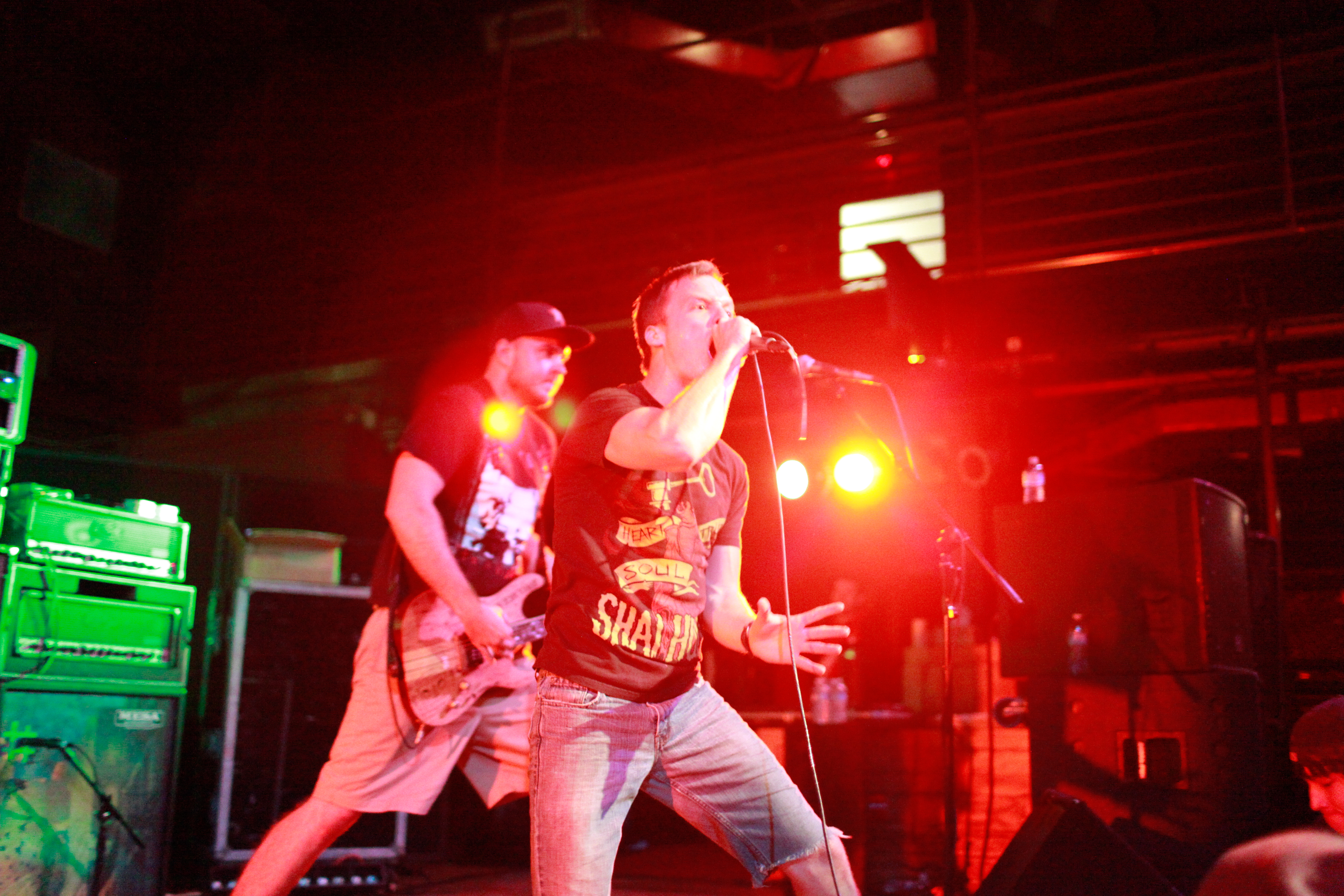
- Close Your Eyes in 2010

Background information
- Origin: Abilene, Texas, U.S.
- Genres: Christian hardcore; melodic hardcore; post-hardcore
- Years active: 2005–2015, 2022–present
- Label: Victory
- Members: Shane Raymond; Sonny Vega; Andrew Rodriguez; Bobby VaLeu; Jordan Hatfield
- Past members: Ben Clinard; Chris Coltman; Brian Escochea; Tim Friesen; Mikey Sawyer; Sam Robinson; Alex Whitten; Brett Callaway

Close Your Eyes is an American melodic hardcore band from Abilene, Texas.

Signed to Victory Records, the group released its debut album, We Will Overcome, in 2010, and a second album Empty Hands and Heavy Hearts, the following year. The third album, Line in the Sand, was released in 2013.

== History ==
=== Formation and first releases ===
The band began in 2005 at Hardin–Simmons University in Abilene, where Shane Raymond and Brett Callaway met and started searching for other musicians to join them. After a short time, they recruited Andrew Rodriguez, Sonny Vega and David Fidler. In 2008, they released their self-titled EP independently and by November 2009, were signed to Victory Records to record their debut studio album, We Will Overcome.

In 2011, they played live two new songs from their upcoming album, Empty Hands and Heavy Hearts, which released on October 24, 2011, through Victory Records. The label released a series of video previews of the upcoming album in their YouTube account.

Their song "Valleys" was the theme song for Total Nonstop Action Wrestling's 2011 Turning Point pay-per-view. A music video featuring TNA professional wrestler Jeff Hardy and centered around his redemption storyline has been released through the wrestling promotion's YouTube account.

=== Departure of Shane Raymond and Line in the Sand ===
On March 2, 2012, it was announced on the band's Facebook page that long-time vocalist Shane Raymond had left the band for personal reasons. On May 17, 2012, Brett Callaway released a statement to Alternative Press announcing that Mikey Sawyer would be touring with the band as the new lead vocalist. Just two months later, on July 10, 2012, Close Your Eyes announced via its official Twitter account that they would be parting ways with Sawyer, as they felt he was not a good fit for the band. In November 2012, the band announced to their Facebook page that they had begun writing songs for their next album. On July 23, 2013, it was announced that the former vocalist of Blessed by a Broken Heart, Sam Ryder Robinson, would be joining the band as they began work on their upcoming album, Line in the Sand.

Line in the Sand was released on October 29, 2013 on Victory Records. The band toured with Islander throughout the month of November in support of the release. Music videos for the songs "Frame and Glass" and "The End", along with a lyric video for "The End", have been produced in support of the release. On Record Store Day 2014, Close Your Eyes released Prepackaged Hope on a 7-inch vinyl.

=== Line-up instability and break-up ===
On May 4, 2014, longtime bassist and backing vocalist Sonny Vega announced his departure from the band with the following statement: "2014 has already been an amazing year. I've had some great business opportunities offered, mom had knee replacement surgery, and I got the best news in the world; I'm going to be a father!!! I can't wait to start this next chapter in my life. This is the reason I've decided to step down from my position in Close Your Eyes. My almost 10 years with the band have been nothing short of amazing. I can honestly say CYE saved my life and also gave me the opportunity to achieve things I only dreamed about. I wouldn't trade those memories for the world. To all the bands I've toured with, it has been an honor. To all the friends I've made on the road, thank you for the great times. To my CYEcrew, I wish you all the best. I'm stoked that Alex Whitten, someone who has been there from the beginning, is stepping up to the plate for me. And to all the fans I've been blessed to have, thank you for all of your support over the years. I love each and every one of you. Be excellent to each other."

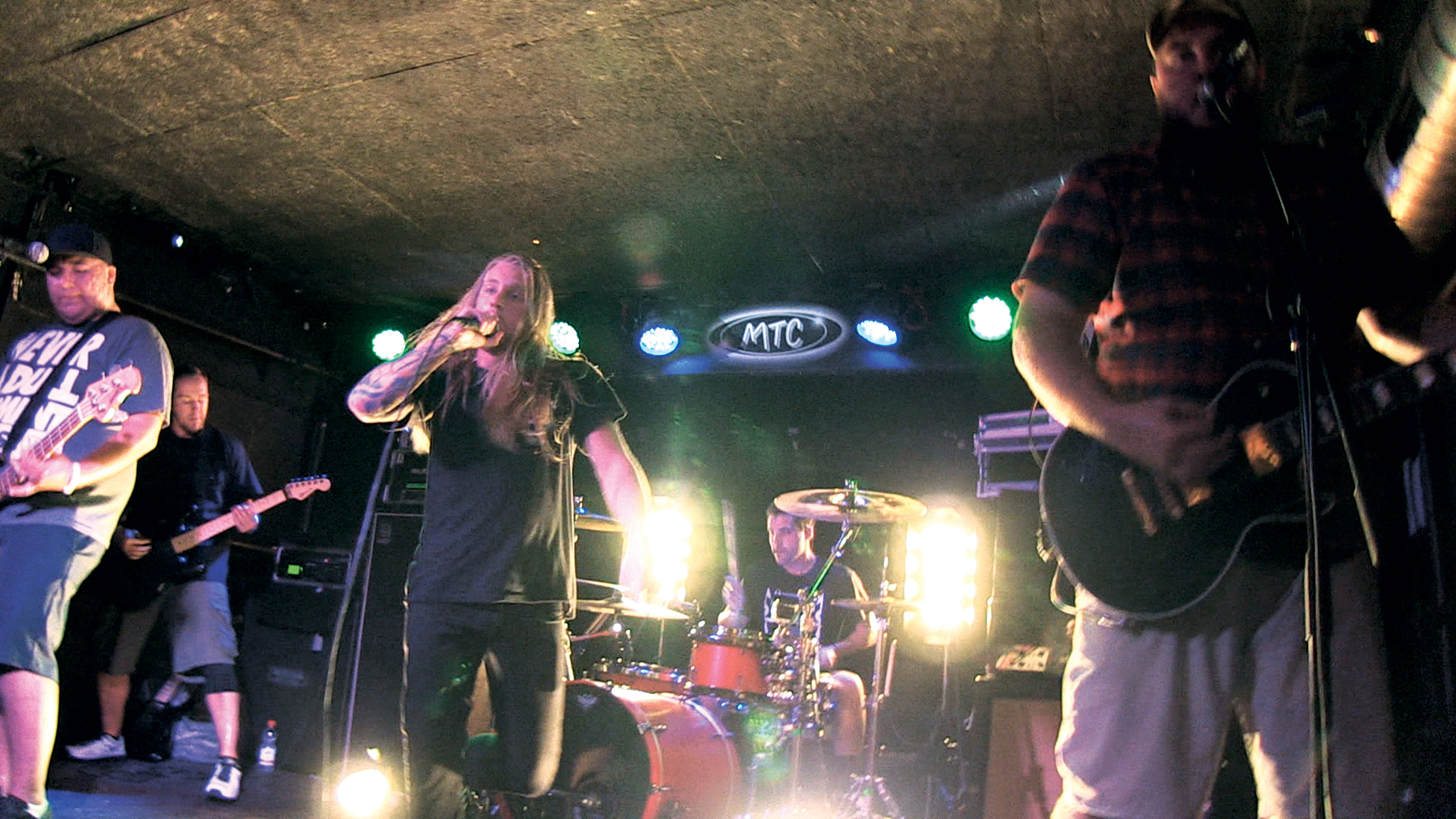
The band in 2013

On December 15, 2014, it was announced that lead vocalist Sam Robinson had decided to leave the band and to continue his music career with a different project. Later that day it was announced that Close Your Eyes would be attending South By So What festival 2015 with the return of their original lead vocalist Shane Raymond.

On July 16, 2015, bassist Alex Whitten posted on Facebook, "Shane and I are no longer a part of the headache that is Close Your Eyes. What Brett does with the band now is entirely up to him because it is his band and he has the right to do so, but after almost 10 years my hands are clean of it." Not long after their departure the band became inactive.

=== Reunion ===
On January 21, 2022, the band announced their comeback on their Facebook page. They will perform for the first time in over 6 years at the So What Music Festival in May.

== Band members ==
Current members

- Shane Raymond – lead vocals (2005–2012, 2014–2015, 2022–present)
- Jordan Hatfield – drums (2012–2015, 2022–present)
- Bobby VaLeu – guitar (2011–2012, 2013–2015, 2022–present)
- Andrew Rodriguez – guitar (2006–2011, 2012–2013, 2022–present)
- Sonny Vega – bass, backing vocals (2006–2014, 2022–present)

Former members

- Brett Callaway – guitar, backing vocals (2005–2015)
- Ben Clinard – bass (2005–2006)
- Chris Coltman – drums (2005–2007)
- David Fidler – drums (2007–2010)
- Tim Friesen – drums (2010–2011)
- Mikey Sawyer – lead vocals (2012)
- Sam Ryder Robinson – lead vocals (2013–2014)
- Alex Whitten – bass, backing vocals (2014–2015)

Former touring members

- Jake Booth – drums (2014)

Timeline

== Discography ==
Close Your Eyes discography
- Studio albums: 3
- Extended plays: 2
- Singles: 10
- Music videos: 10

=== Studio albums ===
Year	Title	Label	Chart peaks					
Year	Title	Label	US	US Christian	US Hard Rock	US Indie	US Rock	US Sales
2010	We Will Overcome	Victory	137	—	—	—	—	—
2011	Empty Hands and Heavy Hearts	Victory	—	7	7	31	29	137
2013	Line in the Sand	Victory	—	39	—	—	—	—
"—" denotes a recording that did not chart

=== EPs ===
Year	Title	Label
2006	3-Track Demo	Independent
2008	Close Your Eyes	Independent
2014	Prepackaged Hope	Victory

=== Music videos ===
Year	Song	Director
2010	"Song for the Broken"	Dan Dobi
2010	"The Body"	Eric Richter
2011	"Digging Graves"	Eric Richter
2011	"Valleys"	Eric Richter
2011	"Keep the Lights On"	Jonathan Calvert
2012	"Carry You"	Eric Richter
2012	"Erie"	Dan Dobi
2013	"Frame and Glass"	David Kenney
2014	"The End"	Eric Richter

== See also ==
- List of Christian hardcore bands
- List of pop-punk bands
- Music of Texas
