= We Will Overcome (album) =

Studio album by Close Your Eyes
- Released: February 16, 2010
- Recorded: 2009
- Studio: Ivory Tower and The State of Sound, Houston
- Genre: Melodic hardcore, post-hardcore, pop punk
- Length: 39:58
- Label: Victory
- Producer: Christopher L. R. Goodwin, MD Thompson

Close Your Eyes chronology
Close Your Eyes EP (2008)	We Will Overcome (2010)	Empty Hands and Heavy Hearts (2011)

Singles from We Will Overcome
- 1. "Song for the Broken" Released: February 2, 2010; 2. "The Body" Released: November 4, 2010; 3. "Digging Graves" Released: May 6, 2011

Professional ratings
Review scores
Source	Rating
Jesus Freak Hideout	3.5/5 stars

We Will Overcome is the debut album by Texas melodic hardcore band Close Your Eyes. It was released on February 16, 2010.

Music videos were produced for the three singles: "Song for the Broken", "The Body", and "Digging Graves".

This album is the only studio album to feature former drummer David Fidler, before his departure from the band.

== Track listing ==
No.	Title	Length
1.	"A Proclamation"	3:53
2.	"Friends are Friends Forever"	3:13
3.	"xChet Steadmanx"	3:21
4.	"Digging Graves"	2:48
5.	"The Body" (featuring Mattie Montgomery of For Today)	4:03
6.	"Song for the Broken"	4:09
7.	"17:20"	2:16
8.	"Wake Up!"	3:28
9.	"Bitter Path"	3:53
10.	"Something Needs to Change"	4:39
11.	"Arms Raised"	4:09
Total length:		39:58

== Personnel ==
=== Close Your Eyes ===
- Shane Raymond – lead vocals
- Andrew Rodriguez – guitar
- Brett Callaway – guitar, backing vocals
- Sonny Vega – bass, backing vocals
- David Fidler – drums

=== Production ===
- Christopher L. R. Goodwin - production, engineering, additional guitars, additional vocals
- MD Thompson - production and engineering
