= Feel the Power =

Studio album by Blessed by a Broken Heart
- Released: January 24, 2012
- Recorded: 2011–2012
- Genre: Glam metal, metalcore
- Length: 49:35
- Label: Tooth & Nail
- Producer: James Paul Wisner

Blessed by a Broken Heart chronology
Pedal to the Metal (2008)	Feel the Power (2012)

Feel the Power is the third studio album by glam metal band Blessed by a Broken Heart, released on January 24, 2012. The album was released through Tooth & Nail Records and was their first release to chart in the US Heatseeker Chart, debuting at No. 19.

== Track listing ==
All tracks are written by Blessed by a Broken Heart

No.	Title	Length
1.	"Deathwish"	4:35
2.	"Shut Up and Rock" (featuring Dallas Taylor)	4:37
3.	"Love Nightmare"	3:42
4.	"Forever"	3:46
5.	"Thunder Dome"	0:39
6.	"Holdin' Back for Nothin'"	3:35
7.	"I've Got You"	5:09
8.	"Rockin' All Night"	4:24
9.	"Scream It Like You Mean It"	3:32
10.	"Skate or Die"	4:02
11.	"Innocent Blood"	5:30
12.	"Sleepless Nights"	5:22

== Personnel ==
- Tony Gambino – lead vocals
- "Shred" Sean Maier – lead guitar
- Sam Ryder – rhythm guitar, backing vocals
- Tyler Hoare – bass guitar, backing vocals
- Ian "Slater" Evans – drums, keyboards, backing vocals
