= There's Nothing but Space, Man! =

Studio album by Sam Ryder
- Released: 9 December 2022
- Genre: Pop; pop rock; dance pop; folk; rock; soul
- Length: 46:54
- Label: Parlophone
- Producer: Mark Ralph; Koz; Tre Jean-Marie; TMS; The Monsters and the Strangerz; German; NjL; Alex Beitzke; Jamie Hartman; Red Triangle; Freedo; Dan Grech-Marguerat; Dan McDougall; Jack Leonard; Sigala; David Guetta; Jarly

Sam Ryder chronology
The Sun's Gonna Rise (2021)	There's Nothing but Space, Man! (2022)	Heartland (2025)

Singles from There's Nothing but Space, Man!
- 1. "Space Man" Released: 22 February 2022; 2. "Somebody" Released: 19 August 2022; 3. "Living Without You" Released: 2 September 2022; 4. "All the Way Over" Released: 4 November 2022

There's Nothing but Space, Man! is the debut studio album by English singer and songwriter Sam Ryder, released on 9 December 2022 through Parlophone Records. The album was written and recorded by Ryder before and after his participation in the Eurovision Song Contest 2022, working with writers and producers including TMS, Tre Jean-Marie and Jamie Hartman. Primarily a pop and pop rock record, with elements of other genres including dance-pop and folk, it features guest appearances from David Guetta and Sigala.

There's Nothing but Space, Man! received generally positive reviews from critics, with praise for Ryder's versatility and vocal performance. It was supported by four singles including "Space Man", which came second in the Eurovision Song Contest 2022 and peaked at number two on the UK Singles Chart. The album debuted atop the UK Albums Chart, becoming the first debut album by a British male solo artist in over three years to debut at number one. It has been certified gold by the British Phonographic Industry (BPI).

== Background ==
In an interview for Variety, Ryder stated that he had begun writing for his album before competing in the Eurovision Song Contest 2022, with alterations being made following the contest. Speaking to Rolling Stone UK, he described There's Nothing but Space, Man! as an album about "focusing on the idea of retaining hope and faith and that's been a massive part of my journey. The album is about the idea of once you've found that thing, never ceasing to grab onto it, never giving up and following that journey and path."

Following his Eurovision participation, he started to tease the release date for his debut album. In an interview for NME, he stated that in 2021 he had written over 100 songs for his album, with many of them not making the final cut. On 16 August 2022, he was announced as one of the artist ambassadors for National Album Day, which in 2022 would celebrate debut albums.

On 5 September 2022, he announced on his social media pages and in an open letter to his fans that his upcoming debut studio album There's Nothing but Space, Man! would be released on 18 November 2022. On the same day the track listing was revealed. In the letter, Ryder wrote:

"This year for myself and the team has been one filled with so many blessings, opportunities and dreams come to fruition. To create a body of work throughout this time representing aspects of our journey feels like the highest honour and a beautiful way to redirect the flow of energy back to the people who are making this whirlwind possible – you. Biggest thank yous, and I hope you enjoy it!".

However, the release date was later delayed to 9 December 2022. The album was available to pre-order on Ryder's website in different bundles including vinyl, CD, and cassette.

== Production and composition ==
There's Nothing but Space, Man! is 46 minutes and 45 seconds long and consists of fourteen tracks, all of which were co-written by Ryder. He worked with several established names, including writers Amy Wadge, Jimmy Napes, TMS, Wayne Hector and Jamie Hartman, and producers including Mark Ralph, David Guetta, and Sigala, the latter two appearing as collaborators on the song "Living Without You". The track listing also includes the previously released singles "Space Man" and "Somebody", as well as "Tiny Riot", "More" and "Whirlwind", which are from his extended play The Sun's Gonna Rise.

The lyrics of There's Nothing but Space, Man! are inspired by Ryder's hardships as a performer in the industry and as a performer while retaining hope and faith. The album explores other themes including isolation, anxiety, grief, vulnerability, strength, and heartbreak. Musically, it incorporates genres including pop, pop rock, dance pop, folk, rock, soul, electropop, gospel, and electro rock.

== Promotion ==
To promote the album, on 26 September 2022 Ryder performed tracks live at Lafayette in London for National Album Day, and in partnership with the charity War Child. He later embarked on a promotional tour in 2022 and 2023 across Europe. He performed tracks from the album live on Sam Ryder Rocks New Year's Eve, the BBC's 2023 New Year's Eve special, which was well received.

== Critical reception ==
Professional ratings
Aggregate scores
Source	Rating
Metacritic	69/100
Review scores
Source	Rating
The Daily Telegraph	4/5 stars
Evening Standard	3/5 stars
The Guardian	2/5 stars
The Line of Best Fit	7/10
Metro	3/5 stars
NME	4/5 stars

At Metacritic, which assigns a normalised rating out of 100 to reviews from mainstream critics, the album has an score of 69 out of 100, indicating "generally favorable reviews". Writing for NME, Nick Levine described the album as a collection of consistently melodic and mostly mid-tempo pop-rock songs. He wrote "Ryder's voice is capable of being gritty in its lower register and recalling Freddie Mercury at its high end is what makes this debut album pop. He drew praise to his vocal ability commenting that "Ryder sounds terrific whether he's delivering a fist-pumping anthem ('Tiny Riot'), a stripped-back ballad ('Whirlwind') or a soulful stomper with a Brian May-style guitar solo ('Ten Tons')." He further highlighted that "his infectious likeability shines through at all times", ending with how "There’s Nothing but Space, Man! sounds like the beginning of what could be a really stellar career".

In The Daily Telegraph, Neil McCormick praised Ryder for his versatility and vocal performance, adding "He has a fantastic falsetto, full and powerful rather than the tremulous squeaky thing heard when so many contemporary singers push themselves to the edge of their range." He highlighted "Tiny Riot" and "Whirlwind" as standout singles, with praise drawn towards the album lyrics.

Laura Snapes for The Guardian wrote a mixed review. She wrote "he shines mostly strongly in the softer songs: the lovely 'Whirlwind' has something of the silvery haze of Taylor Swift's Folklore while Ryder sings about anxiety and devotion. The waltzing 'Lost in You' is similarly vulnerable, about the butterfly effects that lead to love."

== Commercial performance ==
The album debuted atop the UK Albums Chart, making Ryder the first British male solo artist to debut at number one with their debut album since Sam Fender's Hypersonic Missiles (2019), and also the first time a solo artist had debuted at number one since Olivia Rodrigo's Sour (2021). In its first week the album also had the most physical sales and digital downloads of the week, and was the best-selling album in UK independent record shops.

== Singles ==
Four songs were released in support of the album. "Space Man" was co-written by Ryder alongside Amy Wadge and Max Wolfgang before being chosen to represent the United Kingdom at the Eurovision Song Contest 2022. The song peaked at number two on the UK Singles Chart following the contest, becoming the highest-charting UK Eurovision entry since Gina G's "Ooh Aah... Just a Little Bit" in 1996. It has been certified gold by the British Phonographic Industry (BPI).

On 19 August 2022, "Somebody" was released as Ryder's first post-Eurovision track, with lyrics inspired by the general public after the positive reception Ryder had experienced in 2022, about the joy of giving and experiencing love. It peaked at number 77 in the UK.

On 2 September 2022, "Living Without You", with Sigala and David Guetta, was released. It has been described as a house-inspired EDM track and was teased by the trio during a performance in Ibiza. On 4 November 2022, "All the Way Over" was released as the album's fourth single and described as a "heartfelt piano ballad"; in a press release, Ryder called it "a song for anybody on a journey to the other side of loss, grief or heartache".

== Track listing ==
There's Nothing but Space, Man! track listing
No.	Title	Writer(s)	Producer(s)	Length
1.	"Deep Blue Doubt"	Sam Ryder; James Napier; Tom Barnes; Peter Kelleher; Ben Kohn	TMS; Lorna Blackwood^{[v]}	3:55
2.	"Space Man"	Ryder; Amy Wadge; Max Wolfgang	Koz; Mark Ralph^{[a]}; Wadge^{[v]}; Wolfgang^{[v]}	3:37
3.	"Somebody"	Ryder; Wolfgang; Jonathan Green; Clarence Coffee Jr.; Stefan Johnson; Jordan K. Johnson; Oliver Peterhof; Nathaniel Ledwidge	The Monsters & Strangerz; German; NjL; Coffee^{[e]}	3:19
4.	"Tiny Riot"	Ryder; Wadge; Wolfgang	Koz; Wadge^{[v]}	3:24
5.	"All the Way Over"	Ryder; Wadge; Wolfgang	Alex Beitzke^{[p]}; Ralph^{[p]}; Wadge^{[v]}; Wolfgang^{[v]}; Blackwood^{[v]}	3:08
6.	"OK"	Ryder; Wayne Hector; Jimbo Barry	Ralph^{[p]}; Blackwood^{[v]}; Barry^{[v]}	2:57
7.	"Put a Light on Me"	Ryder; Hector; Barry	Ralph; Blackwood^{[v]}	3:05
8.	"Whirlwind"	Ryder; Jamie Hartman	Hartman; Ryder^{[a]}; Wolfgang^{[a]}; Dan Grech-Marguerat^{[a]}	3:28
9.	"Ten Tons"	Ryder; Owen Cutts; Fred Cox	Tre Jean-Marie^{[p]}; Ralph^{[v]}; Blackwood^{[v]}; Cox^{[v]}	3:39
10.	"More"	Ryder; Hector; George Tizzard; Richard Parkhouse	Red Triangle; Freedo; Grech-Marguerat^{[a]}	3:48
11.	"Crashing Down"	Ryder; Mike Needle; Daniel Bryer	Grech-Marguerat; Ralph^{[a]}; Blackwood^{[v]}	3:11
12.	"This Time"	Ryder; Jack Leonard; Dan McDougall	Ralph; Leonard; McDougall	3:08
13.	"Lost in You"	Ryder; Hector; Jean-Marie	Jean-Marie^{[p]}; Blackwood^{[v]}	3:11
14.	"Living Without You" (with Sigala and David Guetta)	Bruce Felder; Tom Grennan; Eddie Serafica; Janee Bennett; James Murray; Mustafa Omer; Joakim Jarl	Sigala; Jarly; David Guetta; Jin Jin^{[v]}	3:04
Total length:				46:54

Notes

- ^{^[p]} – production and vocal production
- ^{^[a]} – additional production
- ^{^[e]} – executive production
- ^{^[v]} – vocal production

== Personnel ==
Musicians

- Sam Ryder – vocals (all tracks), guitar (tracks 1, 13), backing vocals (3)
- Peter Kelleher – backing vocals, piano (1)
- Vanessa Kohn – backing vocals (1)
- Nik Woodham – bass (1)
- Tom Barnes – drum programming (1)
- Vern Asbury – guitar (1)
- Nir Zidkyahu – live drums (1)
- Jimmy Napes – piano (1)
- Max Wolfgang – piano (1), backing vocals (3)
- Ben Kohn – synthesizer (1)
- Mark Ralph – drum programming (2); drums, keyboards, programming (5–7, 11); bass, guitar (7)
- Koz – programming (2, 4); drums, guitar, percussion, synthesizer (2)
- Clarence Coffee Jr. – backing vocals, percussion (3)
- Jon Greene – backing vocals (3)
- Nathaniel Ledwidge – bass, drums (3)
- Dan Ewins – percussion (3)
- Dan Bingham – piano (5)
- Dan Grech-Marguerat – programming (5–9, 11, 13), additional programming (12)
- Lorna Blackwood – backing vocals (7, 9, 11)
- Tre Jean-Marie – bass, drums, organ, programming, synthesizer (9, 13); backing vocals, piano, strings (9)
- Levi Yarde – bass (9, 13)
- Magnus Klausen – guitar (9, 13)
- Ben Noke – piano (9, 13)
- Fred Cox – backing vocals (9)
- Heather Chelan – backing vocals (9)
- Lewis Allen – guitar (9)
- George Tizzard – acoustic guitar, drums, gang vocals (10)
- Freedo – bass, drum programming, guitar, piano, strings programming, snythesizer (10)
- Rick Parkhouse – bass, electric guitar, gang vocals (10)
- Anna Phoebe – strings, string arrangement (10)
- Eos Counsell – violin (10)
- Nayla Sillkey Nyassa – strings (13)

Technical

- Miles Showell – mastering (1–3, 5–7, 9, 11, 13)
- Randy Merrill – mastering (4, 8, 10)
- Mark "Spike" Stent – mixing (1)
- Dan Grech-Marguerat – mixing (2, 5–13)
- Serban Ghenea – mixing (3)
- Matty Green – mixing (4)
- Bryce Bordone – mix engineering (3)
- Claude Vause – engineering (1)
- Matt Snell – engineering (2)
- Josh Green – engineering (5–7, 11)
- Gemma Chester – engineering (5, 7, 11), engineering assistance (6)
- Freedo – engineering (10)
- Charles Haydon Hicks – engineering (13), mixing assistance (5–11)
- Luke Burgoyne – engineering (13), mixing assistance (5–10), additional mixing (11)
- Chris Bishop – vocal engineering (1)
- Jake Skinner – vocal engineering (3)
- Matt Wolach – mixing assistance (1)
- Sam Ryder – additional vocal engineering (10)

== Charts ==
Chart performance for There's Nothing but Space, Man!
Chart (2022)	Peak position
Scottish Albums (OCC)	1
Swiss Albums (Schweizer Hitparade)	65
UK Albums (OCC)	1

== Certifications ==
Certifications for There's Nothing but Space, Man!
Region	Certification	Certified units/sales
United Kingdom (BPI)	Gold	100,000^{‡}
^{‡} Sales+streaming figures based on certification alone.
