= Fought & Lost =

Single by Sam Ryder featuring Brian May
- Released: 24 May 2023
- Genre: Pop
- Length: 4:12
- Label: Parlophone
- Songwriters: Sam Ryder; Jamie Hartman; Tom Howe
- Producers: Jamie Hartman; Tom Howe

Sam Ryder singles chronology
"Mountain" (2023)	"Fought & Lost" (2023)	"You're Christmas to Me" (2023)

"Fought & Lost" is a song by British singer-songwriter Sam Ryder featuring English musician Brian May and Bulgarian musical composer George Strezov. It was released as a single on 24 May 2023 by Parlophone Records. It was written by Ryder alongside Jamie Hartman and Tom Howe, who also produced the track. Ryder performed the song with Hannah Waddingham, at the Grammy Museum.

== Background and release ==
"Fought & Lost" is an original song written for season 3 episode 11 of the American comedy-drama series Ted Lasso. Ryder explained on his social media that he was offered the opportunity to write the song after meeting series star Jason Sudeikis and composer Tom Howe at the Taylor Hawkins Tribute Concert in September 2022.

In an interview with Chris Evans, Ryder described the song lyrically as a track "for the hope seekers & the faith keepers and the ones who foster the dream and keep its fire burning regardless of the knock backs, the almosts, the falls & the failures".

== Production and composition ==
"Fought & Lost" is a ballad featuring vocals from Sam Ryder with comparisons made to rock music legend Freddie Mercury. It features a guitar solo from Brian May, from the British rock band Queen and with a guest appearance from George Strezov, a composer from Bulgaria. The track was written by Ryder, Jamie Hartman and Tom Howe who co-produced the song.

== Critical response ==
After "Fought & Lost" premiered for the first time on Ted Lasso, Joe Tiller in a review from Dig!, described it as "Ryder continuing to showcase his versatility as an artist and his ability to craft music that resonates deeply with listeners". He gave praise towards Ryder's vocal ability and to the song lyrics, describing it as a "unforgettable musical journey".

In a breakdown from Screen Rant, Lewis Glazerbrook wrote how "Fought & Lost" is lyrically focused around individuals ability to bounce back from defeat in everyday aspects, ranging from emotional trauma, to mental health and physical injuries. They concluded that "the song centers on the ups and downs of life, and continuing to fight is better for someone than giving up completely".

== Awards and nominations ==
Awards and nominations for "Fought & Lost"
Year	Award ceremony	Category	Nominee(s)	Result	Ref.
2023	Hollywood Music in Media Awards	Best Original Song in a TV Show/Limited Series	Jamie Hartman, Tom Howe, and Sam Ryder (from Ted Lasso)	Won	
2023	Primetime Emmy Awards	Outstanding Original Music and Lyrics	Jamie Hartman, Tom Howe, and Sam Ryder (from Ted Lasso)	Nominated	

== Charts ==
Chart performance for "Fought & Lost"
Chart (2023)	Peak position
South Korea BGM (Circle)	157
UK Singles Downloads (OCC)	14
