= Blessed by a Broken Heart =

Canadian rock band

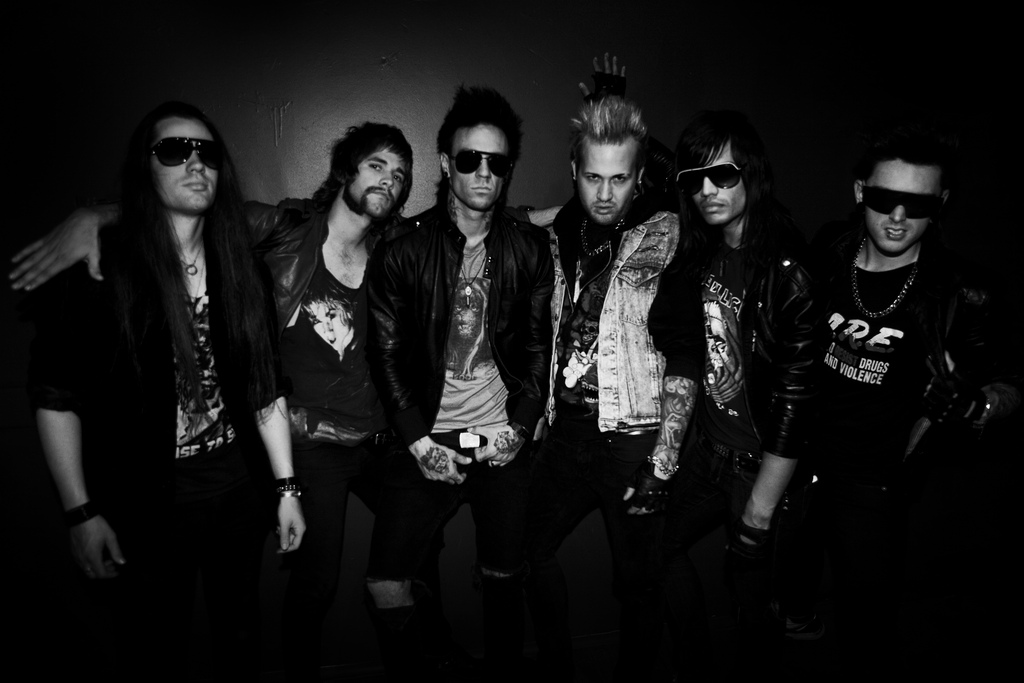
- The band in 2010

Background information
- Also known as: BBABH, Blessed
- Origin: Montreal, Canada
- Genres: Metalcore, glam metal, hard rock
- Years active: 2003–2014, 2023–present
- Labels: Century Media; Blood and Ink; Tooth & Nail; Rude
- Members: Tyler Hoare; Tony Gambino; "Shred" Sean Maier; Brandon Miller; Jared Baez
- Past members: Sam Ryder; Joel "Casey" Jones; Ian "Slater" Evans; Ben "Rex" Krueger; Robbie Hart; Frank "The Bird" Shooflar; Simon Foxx; Jon Cline; Matt Kirk; Hugh Charron; Joel Sauve

Blessed by a Broken Heart is a Canadian rock band from Montreal, Quebec. They released three albums, the last of which, Feel the Power, was released by Tooth & Nail Records and made the Billboard Christian Albums and Heatseekers Albums charts.

The band endured many line-up changes throughout its existence, leaving Hoare as the only original member. In July 2012, Tony Gambino announced he was stepping down as lead vocalist with Sam Ryder taking his place.

In 2022, Tony Gambino returned to the lineup and the band announced its reunion.

== History ==
The band was formed as a concept band in 2003 by Tyler Hoare. The original line-up consisted of vocalist Hugh Charron, bassist Joel Sauvé, guitarists Robbie Hart and Hoare, drummer Frank Shooflar, and keyboardist Simon Foxx. Their first album, All Is Fair in Love and War, was released on Blood and Ink Records in 2004.

Joel Sauvé and Hugh Charron departed in 2005. Hoare switched to bass and shred-style guitarist, "Shred" Sean Maier, from Long Island, joined. The band then began to change to a more 1980s glam metal sound. The next year, they toured in the United Kingdom on a sold-out headlining tour with Enter Shikari.

In January 2007, after the addition of vocalist Tony Gambino, they signed with Century Media Records. They recorded their second studio album, Pedal to the Metal, at The Farm in Vancouver, with producer Garth Richardson and engineer Ben Kaplan. The rest of 2007 was spent touring the U.S. with The Devil Wears Prada, A Day to Remember and Mychildren Mybride; before joining Kittie, It Dies Today, Silent Civilian, and Bring Me the Horizon for another U.S. tour.

In mid-January 2008, they returned to Europe, again touring with Bring Me the Horizon, as well as Maroon and Architects. They finished that tour with a string of headlining dates in the UK with Azriel and Dividing The Line. After that tour, rhythm guitarist, Robbie Hart and keyboardist Simon Foxx, both original members, were kicked out of the band.

In mid-2008, they were joined by rhythm guitarist Casey Jones and keyboardist Slater, and took part in on the first annual Scream the Prayer Tour, with Sleeping Giant, Impending Doom, and War of Ages.

Pedal to the Metal was released by Century Media in Europe in August 2008 and the US in September 2008. A headline tour in Europe and the UK was booked for November and December 2008 with support from I Am Ghost and Devil's Gift. After the European tour, original drummer Frank Shooflar left to pursue his career as a record producer and songwriter, Slater then moved to drums and former Still Remains keyboardist Ben Schauland was added, under the moniker "Rex Krueger".

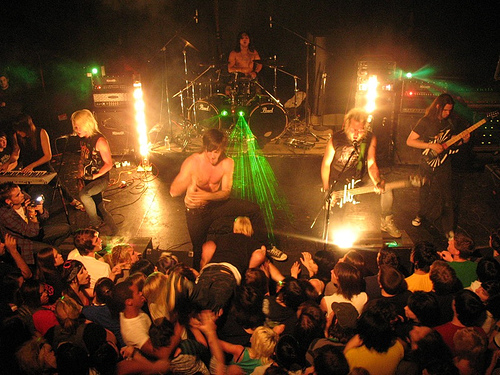
Blessed by a Broken Heart performing in 2007

In 2009, the band announced their relationship with Century Media Records had come to a mutually-agreed end.

In mid-2010, the band again took part in Scream the Prayer, this time with Maylene and the Sons of Disaster, For Today, A Plea for Purging, The Color Morale, and several others. However, they had to cut the tour short due to bus problems and the death of Hoare's grandmother. They played their last show of the tour at Christian rock festival HeavenFest. Keyboardist Ben "Rex Krueger" Schauland left the band. Sam Ryder, then a member of the Morning After, played rhythm guitar on the band's European tour while Casey Jones stayed home to be present for the birth of his first child.

On June 24, 2011, Tooth & Nail Records released a video officially welcoming Blessed by a Broken Heart to the label's roster, in which the band announced that they were recording a new album. On September 30, the band announced that a song called "Deathwish" would be released on October 17, 2011 for the cost of a tweet, and would be the first single from the new album, Feel the Power, which was at the time planned for release on January 24, 2012. A second single, "Forever", was released on December 6, 2011, with an accompanying video premiering on January 17, 2012.

In July 2012, Gambino, announced his departure and rhythm guitarist Sam Ryder was announced as new vocalist. Ryder appeared on a third single, "Out of Control", released July 24, 2012.

On September 7, 2013, guitarist Sean Maier announced that the band was breaking up due to repeated legal struggles with record companies and lack of support from booking agencies. The post also stated that singer Sam Ryder would continue working as the frontman for Close Your Eyes and Maier would continue to work on his new project Shred Starz. Ryder has recently left the band Close Your Eyes.

The band reunited for a farewell show on October 31, 2014.

The first teaser of the reunion appeared on the band's Instagram on October 6, 2022, and a performance at Furnace Fest 2023 was announced on December 23.

The new lineup includes Tony Gambino, Tyler Hoare, "Shred" Sean, Ian "Slater" and new member Don Vedda.

The single "SHOTS FIRED" was released on March 3, 2023.

The single "Days of Thunder" was released on June 24, 2023.

== Band members ==
Current

- Tyler Hoare – bass (2005–2013, 2014, 2023–present), backing vocals (2003–2013); rhythm guitar (2003–2005)
- "Shred" Sean Maier – lead guitar (2005–2013, 2014, 2023–present)
- Tony Gambino – lead vocals (2007–2012, 2014, 2023–present)
- Brandon Miller – rhythm guitar, backing vocals (2023–present)
- Jared Baez – drums (2023–present)

Former

- Hugh Charron – lead vocals (2003–2005)
- Joel Sauvé – bass (2003–2005)
- Nathan – rhythm guitar (2005)
- Robbie Hart – lead guitar (2003–2005), rhythm guitar, (2005–2008) backing vocals (2003–2008)
- Frank "The Bird" Shooflar – drums (2003–2008)
- Simon Foxx – keyboards, additional guitar (2003–2008)
- Matt Kirk – lead vocals (2005–2006)
- Jon Cline – lead vocals (2006–2007)
- Ben Schauland "Rex Krueger" – keyboards (2009–2010)
- Sam Ryder – lead vocals (2012–2013), rhythm guitar, backing vocals (2010–2013)
- Ian "Captain Morgain" Scott – rhythm guitar (2012–2013 touring)
- Joel "Casey" Jones – rhythm guitar, backing vocals (2008–2010, 2014)
- Ian "Slater" Evans – keyboards (2008–2009, 2010–2013, 2014), drums (2009–2013, 2014), backing vocals (2008–2013, 2014)

Timeline

== Discography ==
Year	Album	Label	Chart positions	
Year	Album	Label	US Christ.	US Heat.
2005	All Is Fair in Love and War	Blood and Ink Records	—	—
2008	Pedal to the Metal	Century Media Records	—	—
2012	Feel the Power	Tooth & Nail Records	28	19
