= Space Man =

2022 single by Sam Ryder

Single by Sam Ryder

from the album There's Nothing but Space, Man!
- Released: 22 February 2022
- Genre: Pop rock; soft rock
- Length: 3:37 (original version); 3:04 (Eurovision version)
- Label: Parlophone
- Songwriters: Sam Ryder; Amy Wadge; Max Wolfgang
- Producer: Koz

Sam Ryder singles chronology
"The Sun's Gonna Rise" (2021)	"Space Man" (2022)	"Somebody" (2022)

Music video
- "Space Man" on YouTube

Eurovision Song Contest 2022 entry
- Country: United Kingdom
- Artist: Sam Ryder
- Composers: Sam Ryder; Amy Wadge; Max Wolfgang
- Lyricists: Sam Ryder; Amy Wadge; Max Wolfgang

Finals performance
- Final result: 2nd
- Final points: 466

Entry chronology
- ◄ "Embers" (2021)
- "I Wrote a Song" (2023) ►

Official performance video
- "Space Man" (Grand Final) on YouTube

"Space Man" is a song by British singer-songwriter Sam Ryder, released as a single on 22 February 2022 through Parlophone Records. It represented the United Kingdom at the Eurovision Song Contest 2022 in Turin, Italy, after being internally selected through TaP Music and the BBC, the British broadcaster for the Eurovision Song Contest. Co-written by Ryder, Amy Wadge and Max Wolfgang, it appears on Ryder's debut studio album There's Nothing but Space, Man!, which was released on 9 December 2022.

"Space Man" received positive reviews from critics, who praised Ryder's vocals, and they additionally commended his positive attitude and desire to see change how the British public and press view the Eurovision Song Contest. Described as an uplifting pop track, it became a fan favourite to win the contest. Ryder embarked on a promotional tour for the song, including giving televised performances at Capital's Summertime Ball and at the Platinum Party at the Palace.

At the contest in Italy, Ryder finished in second place with 466 points, becoming the highest scoring UK Eurovision entrant and winning the jury vote with 283 points, and scoring the third highest jury votes by a contestant. He gave the UK their best result since 1998 and its first top three result since 2002. "Space Man" peaked at number two on the UK Singles Chart, becoming the highest-charting UK Eurovision entry since Gina G's "Ooh Aah... Just a Little Bit" in 1996. It has been certified Platinum by the British Phonographic Industry (BPI).

== Background and release ==
"Space Man" was released on 22 February 2022 onto all streaming platforms. Ryder was announced as the UK's Eurovision entry on March 10, 2022, by Scott Mills on BBC Radio 1, with the song being previously featured on ‘Tune of the Week’. The music video premiered onto the Eurovision Song Contest's official YouTube channel on the same day and was filmed in Budapest, Hungary. It was included on the 2022 edition of Now That's What I Call Music!. It appears on Ryder's debut studio album There's Nothing but Space, Man!.

On 18 May, Ryder released a Eurovision guitar solo version after his performance at the Eurovision Song Contest 2022. On 1 June, limited signed Platinum Jubilee editions were released on 7 June. On 23 March 2023, Ryder's jumpsuit that he had worn at the Eurovision final was displayed in Liverpool, ahead of the city hosting the contest in May.

== Production and composition ==
"Space Man" was co-written and composed by Sam Ryder, Grammy nominated winning singer-songwriter Amy Wadge, and Max Wolfgang. It was recorded at Cube Recording Studios in Cornwall, amid the COVID-19 pandemic, in London. It was also produced by Canadian record producer Koz. "Space Man" is a pop track, showing 70s pop influences like Elton John and Queen, and runs for a total of 3 minutes and 4 seconds.

== Critical reception ==
"Space Man" was met with universal acclaim, and became a fan favourite to win the contest. The Evening Standard described the song as "a solidly written pop song; whether it'll win over our European cousins remains to be seen." James Hall in The Daily Telegraph stated "Ryder represents our greatest hope of rising from the Eurovision ashes for years. [...] Not only can he sing, but he can perform too thanks to his time on the metal circuit and in Nashville. He has charisma. [...] Picking him is a clever move." Simon Duke in the Chronicle Live stated "Following his first rehearsal in Turin, Italy, he has been declared as the UK's best Eurovision hope in years". El Hunt for magazine Bustle described "Space Man" thus: "Covered with galactic sliding guitars and more than a hint of Elton John, the song imagines floating in space as a lonely, isolated astronaut with the longing to be grounded back down to earth again. And fair play, it's not too bad." Caroline Frost in The Spectator said "Listen to this year's entry, and you will hear hints of Sir Elton's 'Rocket Man' and 'Tiny Dancer'. At last we’re taking it seriously, and we're channelling the best of British pop music, one of our greatest soft powers. But this year, for the first in decades, we can at least say we tried. And everyone loves a trier."

George Griffiths from The Official Charts Company said "'Space Man' is one of the most exciting entries the UK has sent in recent memory. [...Ryder's] entry, is a scatter-shot pop banger, with an electrifying chorus that does seem at points like it's lifting up into the atmosphere. One thing is certain the UK are taking Eurovision seriously this year." Angelica Frey in The Guardian stated "'Space Man' has filching celestial vibes from Elton John’s 'Rocket Man', to the Beatles’ 'Across the Universe' and R.E.M.'s 'Man on the Moon'. His strident chorus notes really hit you between the eyes but 'Space Man' is our best entry for many years." William Lee Adams from Vice and Wiwibloggs described his entry as a "emotive ballad with his voice gliding across varied terrain, from deep to gritty to a glorious falsetto. I still can’t help but root for Sam." Nick Reilly for Rolling Stone UK stated: "Ryder is the UK’s brightest Eurovision hope we've had in years and is the strongest song that we have sent in a decade. A good song is nothing without a great singer, and Ryder’s impressive vocal range proves that he’s a huge talent in his own right. His entry allows those vocals to soar once more. Anchored by a soaring, stadium-sized chorus that is bound to grab the hearts of the continent." Rachel Aroesti for The Guardian stated: "the song is a rollicking power ballad about loneliness that recalls classic British pop such as Elton John’s 'Rocket Man', Bowie’s 'Starman', and Queen. Co-written with Ed Sheeran collaborator Amy Wadge, it is slick, dramatic and formidably catchy, and it’s not hard to see why Ryder is our best bet in ages."

Attitude ranked the song at number seven on their list of Best Eurovision UK entries of the 21st century. In 2023, "Space Man" was named as the UK's favourite Eurovision UK entry in a voting poll with BBC Radio 2. The Daily Telegraph included "Space Man" as number three on their 2023 list of worst to best UK Eurovision entries. In February 2024, I news, named it as the UK's best Eurovision entry. In April 2025, it was voted as the "greatest Eurovision entry of the 21 century" by the BBC Radio 2 listeners.

== Promotion ==
Ryder embarked on a European tour to promote his single. Following the announcement that he would be representing the UK at Eurovision, "Space Man" had its TV debut performance on BBC's The One Show, and he was interviewed on the same day. He travelled to Bulgaria to perform the song on The Nikolaos Tsitiridis Show and also recorded the UK 'live-on-tape' backup performance for Eurovision. He continued with his promotions in Netherlands, Serbia, and San Marino, and to other countries within Europe.

Besides televised performances he attended radio events and Eurovision pre parties throughout Europe. For his interviews on This Morning and Good Morning Britain, he was praised for his positive attitude to see change in how the British public and press views the Eurovision Song Contest. On 22 April 2022, the song was performed at the York Hall for Eurovision House Party.

On 7 May 2022, following his second rehearsal run in Turin, Italy, Ryder's live performance received positive reviews from critics and fans. It was confirmed that he had brought the biggest prop of the competition, a huge illuminated metallic structure. Following Ryder's rehearsal, he rose up in the betting odds and became one of the favourites to win the contest. On 12 May 2022, the BBC aired a documentary detailing Ryder's journey to Eurovision.

Ryder continued with promotional activities following the Eurovision final. He gave interviews across the UK on daytime and night time talk shows, including The One Show and Good Morning Britain. He continued his promotions on radio stations including BBC Radio 1, BBC Radio 2, and Capital. He performed the single at the Platinum Party at the Palace, in which he received positive reviews. He later performed an orchestral version of the track at the 2022 Royal Variety Show.

== Eurovision Song Contest ==
=== Selection ===
On 21 October 2021, the day after the official list of participants in Eurovision 2022 was released, the BBC announced its plans for the British national selection, opting for an internal process no longer in collaboration with record label BMG, but with TaP Music instead. The management company's leading artists include Dua Lipa, Ellie Goulding and Lana Del Rey. Kate Phillips (BBC commissioning editor) stated that the new collaboration "will enable the BBC to tap into some great music talent" and that the broadcaster has "big ambitions for the 2022 contest". On 25 January 2022, TaP revealed that they had started shortlisting potential acts for the contest – with established, emerging and brand new artists having approached them for the Eurovision project – and that they had worked with BBC Radio 1 and Scott Mills in order to choose the British representative.

Sam Ryder was announced as the chosen entrant with the song "Space Man" on 10 March 2022. The entry was revealed by Scott Mills on BBC Radio 1's breakfast show with Greg James, with "Space Man" having previously featured as 'Tune of the Week' on Mills' afternoon show on Radio 1. It was later announced that TaP Music would donate their consultancy fees to the Migrant Offshore Aid Station, to support those affected by the 2022 Russian invasion of Ukraine.

=== At Eurovision ===
The Eurovision Song Contest 2022 was held at the PalaOlimpico in Turin, Italy. The two semi-finals were held on 10 and 12 May and the grand final on 14 May 2022. Since the United Kingdom is a member of the "Big Five", they qualified directly for the final. In addition to their participation in the final, the United Kingdom was also required to broadcast and vote in one of the two semi-finals. This was decided via a draw held during the semi-final allocation draw on 25 January 2022, when it was announced that the United Kingdom would be voting in the second semi-final.

Leading after the jury vote with 283 points, the United Kingdom would finish in second place behind Ukraine with 466 points overall after the televote—its best result at Eurovision since 1998, and its first top three finish since 2002.

== Cover versions ==
The song has been covered by Dutch singer and YouTuber Davina Michelle, Norwegian singer and violinist Alexander Rybak, and Swedish singer Måns Zelmerlöw.

Ryder himself performed a mashup of the song with elements of "I Wanna Be Your Slave" by Italian rock band Måneskin, during "Your Lyrics, Different Song" with Scott Mills on BBC Radio 1. The song was performed by both Ryder and Swedish Eurovision entrant Cornelia Jakobs on the social media app TikTok.

== Commercial performance ==
"Space Man" made its first appearance on the UK Singles Chart at number seventy-eight. Following the Eurovision final, the OCC reported that at the midweek stage, it was a contender for the number one spot. On 20 May, it reached a new peak of number two, becoming the highest-charting UK Eurovision entry since Gina G's "Ooh Aah... Just a Little Bit" in 1996. It marked 50 years since a UK runner up at Eurovision last had a number two single and fifty years since a UK runner up at Eurovision last had a top ten, five and three UK Single. It topped the Official Singles Sales and Downloads Charts. It was ranked as the third best-selling song of 2022 in the UK.

"Space Man" reached number one on The Official Big Top 40 charts, and achieved moderate success in other European countries. The song peaked at number five in Iceland and reached the top fifteen in Lithuania, Sweden, and the German Download Charts. It reached the top twenty in Belgium, the Australian Digital Tracks and also number twenty-two in Ireland, becoming the highest charting UK Eurovision entry on the Irish Singles Chart since 2014. It also charted in the Netherlands, Switzerland, Greece, Turkey, Slovakia and on the Billboard Global 200.

=== Year-end lists ===
Space Man on year-end lists
Critic/Publication	List	Rank	Ref.
Official Charts	Best-selling songs of 2022	3	

== Charts ==
=== Weekly charts ===
Weekly chart performance for "Space Man"
Chart (2022)	Peak position
Australia Digital Tracks (ARIA)	30
Belgium (Ultratop 50 Flanders)	22
Germany Download (GfK)	12
Global 200 (Billboard)	93
Greece (IFPI)	51
Iceland (Tónlistinn)	5
Ireland (IRMA)	22
Lithuania (AGATA)	13
Netherlands (Dutch Top 40)	27
Netherlands (Single Top 100)	71
Slovakia Airplay (ČNS IFPI)	46
Sweden (Sverigetopplistan)	15
Switzerland (Schweizer Hitparade)	45
Turkey (Radiomonitor Top 100)	48
UK Singles (OCC)	2

=== Year-end charts ===
Year-end chart performance for "Space Man"
Chart (2022)	Position
Belgium (Ultratop 50 Flanders)	72
UK Singles (OCC)	66
UK Singles Sales (OCC)	3

== Certifications ==
Certifications for "Space Man"
Region	Certification	Certified units/sales
United Kingdom (BPI)	Platinum	600,000^{‡}
^{‡} Sales+streaming figures based on certification alone.

== Accolades ==
Accolades for "Space Man"
Year	Award ceremony	Category	Nominee(s)/work(s)	Result	Ref.
2022	Marcel Bezençon Awards	Press Award	Himself	Won	
2022	The Official Big Top 40	UK Number One	"Space Man"	Won	
2022	Edinburgh International Television Festival	TV Moment of the Year	"Space Man" – Eurovision Performance	Nominated	
2022	Eurovision Awards	Best Video	"Space Man"	Won	
2022	ESC Eurovision Radio Awards	Best Song & Best Male Artist	"Space Man"	Won	
