= Alien Sex Fiend discography =

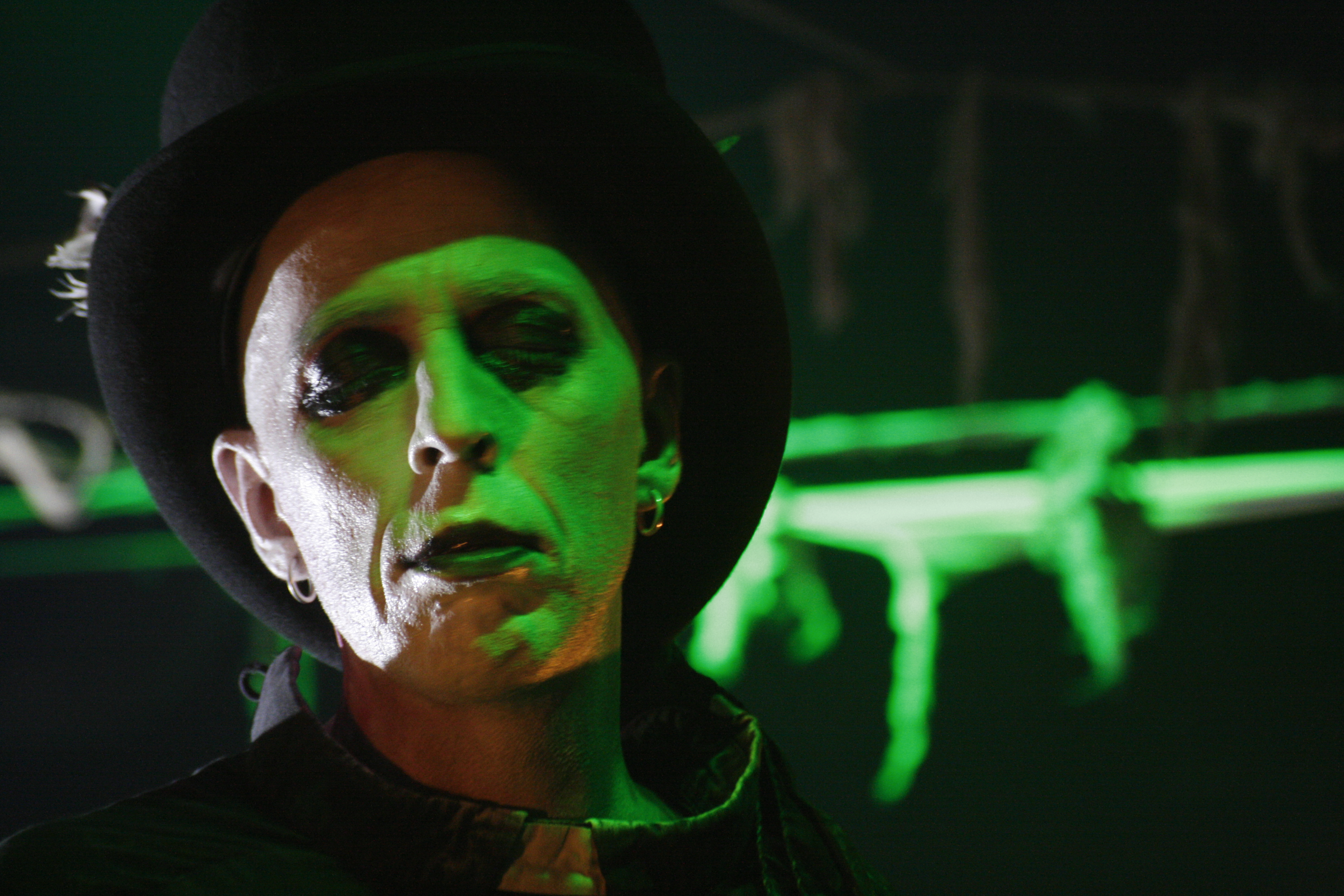
- Alien Sex Fiend live in Paris, 2007
- Studio albums: 13
- EPs: 2
- Live albums: 5
- Compilation albums: 14
- Singles: 23
- Video albums: 5
- Box sets: 3

The English gothic rock band Alien Sex Fiend have released 13 studio albums, six live albums, 17 compilation albums, two extended plays, 22 singles and eight video albums. Most of their releases have been on Anagram Records, a sub-label of Cherry Red Records. The band have also released three studio albums and three singles on the 13th Moon label, founded in 1996 by band members Nik Wade (Nik Fiend) and Christine Wade (Mrs. Fiend).

In the 1980s, the band's releases regularly reached the top 20 on the UK Indie Chart, beginning with the 1983 release of "Ignore the Machine", which peaked at No. 6 on the UK Indie Singles Chart. Between 1983 and 1987, 12 more Alien Sex Fiend singles appeared on the charts, all but one of which reached the top 20. Five of their albums made the top 20 on the UK Independent Album Chart.

Two mid-1980s singles also made the official UK Singles Chart: "Dead and Buried" peaked at No. 91 in 1984, while a reissued version of "Ignore the Machine" reached No. 99 the following year. Maximum Security was the band's sole album to make the UK Albums Chart, reaching No. 100 in 1985.

== Albums ==
=== Studio albums ===
| Title | Album details | Peak chart positions | |
| Title | Album details | UK | UK Indie |
|---|---|---|---|
| Who's Been Sleeping in My Brain | Released: 25 November 1983; Label: Anagram; Formats: LP | — | 10 |
| Acid Bath | Released: October 1984; Label: Anagram; Formats: LP, MC | — | 4 |
| Maximum Security | Released: October 1985; Label: Anagram; Formats: LP, MC | 100 | 5 |
| "It" the Album | Released: November 1986; Label: Anagram; Formats: LP, MC | — | 7 |
| Here Cum Germs | Released: 5 October 1987; Label: Anagram; Formats: LP, MC | — | 22 |
| Another Planet | Released: 14 November 1988; Label: Anagram; Formats: CD, LP, MC | — | — |
| Curse | Released: 24 September 1990; Label: Anagram; Formats: CD, LP, MC | — | — |
| Open Head Surgery | Released: 30 March 1992; Label: Anagram; Formats: CD, LP, MC | — | — |
| Inferno – The Odyssey Continues | Released: November 1994; Label: Anagram; Formats: CD, 2xLP | — | — |
| Nocturnal Emissions | Released: 10 March 1997; Label: 13th Moon; Formats: CD, 2xLP | — | — |
| Information Overload | Released: February 2004; Label: 13th Moon; Formats: CD | — | — |
| Death Trip | Released: 3 May 2010; Label: 13th Moon; Formats: CD, LP | — | — |
| Possessed | Released: 9 November 2018; Label: Cherry Red; Formats: CD, 2xLPm digital download | — | — |
"—" denotes releases that did not chart or were not released in that territory.

NOTE: Another Planet charted on US CMJ College Top 100 at #33

=== Live albums ===
| Title | Album details | Peak chart positions |
| Title | Album details | UK Indie |
|---|---|---|
| Turn the Monitors Up | Released: 1984; Label: F.O.; Formats: MC | — |
| Liquid Head in Tokyo | Released: July 1985; Label: Anagram; Formats: LP | 7 |
| Too Much Acid? | Released: 18 September 1989; Label: Anagram; Formats: CD, 2xLP, MC | — |
| The Altered States of America | Released: February 1993; Label: Anagram; Formats: CD, LP, MC | — |
| Flashbacks! – Live 1995–1998 | Released: September 2001; Label: Yeaah!; Formats: CD | — |
"—" denotes releases that did not chart or were not released in that territory.

=== Compilation albums ===
| Title | Album details |
|---|---|
| All Our Yesterdays | Released: 29 February 1988; Label: Anagram; Formats: CD, LP |
| The Legendary Batcave Tapes | Released: October 1993; Label: Anagram; Formats: CD, LP, MC |
| Drive My Rocket – The Collection Part One | Released: September 1994; Label: Cleopatra; Formats: CD; US-only release |
| The Singles 1983–1995 | Released: 1995; Label: Anagram; Formats: CD, LP, MC |
| I'm Her Frankenstein – The Collection Part Two | Released: January 1995; Label: Cleopatra; Formats: CD; US-only release |
| Wardance of the Alien Sex Fiend | Released: 9 February 1998; Label: Recall 2 cd; Formats: 2xCD |
| The Bat Cave Masters | Released: April 1998; Label: Cleopatra; Formats: CD; US-only release |
| Fiend at the Controls Vol. 1 & 2 | Released: 24 May 1999; Label: Anagram; Formats: 2xCD |
| The Best of Alien Sex Fiend | Released: 26 February 2001; Label: Anagram; Formats: CD |
| R.I.P. – A 12'' Collection | Released: 17 November 2008; Label: Anagram; Formats: 2xCD |
| Bat Cave Anthems | Released: February 2009; Label: Cleopatra; Formats: CD; US-only release |
| Between Good and Evil – The Collection | Released: 6 May 2013; Label: PressPlay; Formats: CD |
| ʽAbducted! The Best of Alien Sex Fiend | Released: 10 July 2013; Label: Anagram; Formats: digital download |
| Fiendology: A 35 Year Trip Through Fiendish History 1982–2017 A.D. and Beyond | Released: 25 August 2017; Label: Cherry Red; Formats: 3xCD |

=== Box sets ===
| Title | Album details |
|---|---|
| A.S.F. Box | Released: 1990; Label: Windsong International; Formats: 9xCD; Japan-only release |
| Classic Albums and BBC Sessions Collection | Released: 23 February 2015; Label: Cherry Red; Formats: 4xCD |
| Classic Albums Volume 2 | Released: 24 June 2016; Label: Cherry Red; Formats: 4xCD |

=== Video albums ===
| Title | Album details |
|---|---|
| A Purple Glistener | Released: 1983; Label: Jettisoundz Video; Formats: VHS |
| Liquid Head in Tokyo | Released: 1985; Label: Cherry Red Films; Formats: VHS |
| Edit | Released: June 1987; Label: Jettisoundz Video; Formats: VHS |
| Over Dose! | Released: 1988; Label: Jettisoundz Video; Formats: VHS |
| Re-Animated – The Promo Collection | Released: 1995; Label: Visionary Communications/Cleopatra; Formats: VHS; US-only release |

== EPs ==
| Title | EP details |
|---|---|
| The Impossible Mission Mini L.P. | Released: August 1987; Label: PVC; Formats: LP, MC; US-only release |
| Re-Possessed EP | Released: 8 November 2019; Label: 13th Moon; Formats: digital download |

== Singles ==
| Single | Year | Peak chart positions | | Album |
| Single | Year | UK | UK Indie | Album |
|---|---|---|---|---|
| "Ignore the Machine" | 1983 | — | 6 | Non-album single |
| "Lips Can't Go" | 1983 | 126 | 12 | Who's Been Sleeping In My Brain |
| "R.I.P. (Blue Crumb Truck)"/"New Christian Music" | 1984 | 103 | 4 | Non-album single |
| "Dead and Buried" | 1984 | 91 | 4 | Acid Bath |
| "E.S.T. (Trip to the Moon)" | 1984 | 120 | 3 | Acid Bath |
| "Ignore the Machine" (reissue) | 1985 | 99 | 6 | Non-album single |
| "I'm Doing Time in a Maximum Security Twilight Home" | 1985 | 138 | — | Maximum Security |
| "I Walk the Line" | 1986 | 133 | 12 | Non-album single |
| "Smells Like..." | 1986 | 128 | — | "It" the Album |
| "Hurricane Fighter Plane" | 1987 | 118 | — | Non-album single |
| "The Impossible Mission" | 1987 | 134 | 11 | Here Cum the Germs |
| "Here Cum Germs" | 1987 | 156 | 14 | Here Cum the Germs |
| "Stuff the Turkey" | 1987 | 157 | 14 | Non-album single |
| "Bun Ho!" | 1988 | 178 | — | Another Planet |
| "Haunted House" | 1989 | — | — | Non-album single |
| "Now I'm Feeling Zombiefied" | 1990 | — | — | Curse |
| "Magic" | 1992 | 190 | — | Open Head Surgery |
| "Inferno" (The Mixes) | 1994 | — | — | Inferno – The Odyssey Continues |
| "Evolution" | 1996 | — | — | Nocturnal Emissions |
| "On a Mission" (Remixes) | 1997 | — | — | Nocturnal Emissions |
| "Tarot" | 1998 | — | — | Nocturnal Emissions |
| "All the Madmen" (US-only release) | 2007 | — | — | Non-album single |
| "Shit's Coming Down" | 2018 | — | — | Possessed |
"—" denotes releases that did not chart or were not released in that territory.
