= All Our Yesterdays =

All Our Yesterdays may refer to:

== Television ==
- All Our Yesterdays (TV series), a UK popular history programme from 1960 to 1989
- "All Our Yesterdays" (Rising Damp), a 1974 episode
- "All Our Yesterdays" (Star Trek: The Original Series), a 1969 episode

== Literature ==
- "Tomorrow and tomorrow and tomorrow", the origin of the phrase, a soliloquy from the Shakespeare play Macbeth
- All Our Yesterdays (book), a 1969 history of 1940s science fiction fandom, by Harry Warner, Jr.
- All Our Yesterdays (novel), 1994, by Robert B. Parker
- Tutti i nostri ieri ('All Our Yesterdays'), a novel by Natalia Ginzburg. Its American title, A Light for Fools, also alludes to the same passage from Macbeth.

== Music ==
=== Albums ===
- All Our Yesterdays, a 1988 compilation album by Alien Sex Fiend
- All Our Yesterdays (EP), 2011, by Verah Falls
- All Our Yesterdays (Blackmore's Night album), 2015

=== Songs ===
- "All Our Yesterdays", a song by Allan Holdsworth from his 1986 album Atavachron
- "All Our Yesterdays", a 2010 song by Alan Parsons
- "All Our Yesterdays", a song by Mac Demarco from his 2019 album Here Comes the Cowboy

== See also ==
- All Yesterdays, 2012 book by Darren Naish, C.M. Kosemen and John Conway, with the 2013 sequel All Your Yesterdays
- All Tomorrows, 2006 book by C. M. Kosemen
