= John Piper =

John Piper may refer to:

- John Piper (artist) (1903–1992), English painter, printmaker and designer of stained-glass windows
- John Piper (broadcaster), BBC radio host
- John Piper (British Army officer) (1773–1851), lieutenant-governor of Norfolk Island
- John Piper (theologian) (born 1946), Calvinist Baptist pastor and author
- John Piper, a recurring fictional character in crime novels by Harry Carmichael, a pen name of British writer Leo Ognall

== See also ==
- Piper (surname)
- John Pyper-Ferguson (born 1964), Canadian actor
