= Disappearance of Amy Fitzpatrick =

Disappearance of a 15-year-old Irish girl

Amy Fitzpatrick
- Born: Amy Carrie Fitzpatrick; 7 February 1992; Dublin, Ireland
- Disappeared: 1 January 2008 (aged 15); Málaga, Spain
- Status: Missing for 18 years, 8 months and 3 days

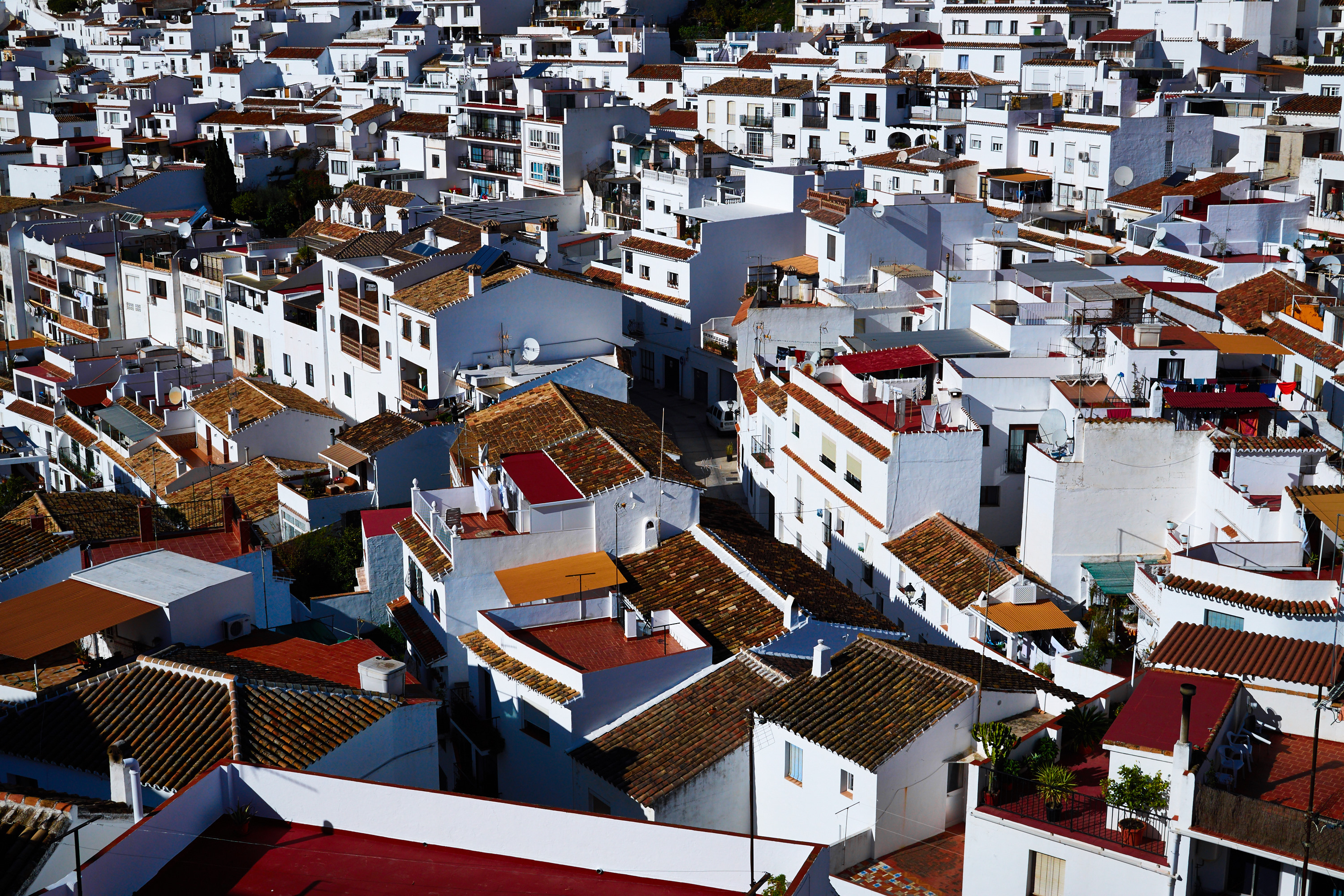
Mijas, Spain

The disappearance of Amy Fitzpatrick occurred on New Year's Day 2008. At 10pm on that day, 15-year-old Irish girl Amy Fitzpatrick said goodbye to her friend Ashley Rose, with whom she had been babysitting Ashley's brother at a house in Mijas Costa in Málaga, Spain. Fitzpatrick should have arrived at her home a few minutes later, as it was only a short walk away. She never arrived home and has not been heard from or seen since that night.

== Initial search ==
Following her disappearance, a search involving hundreds of people was launched amidst speculation this was not an abduction.

In August 2008, the home of Dave Mahon - the partner of Amy Fitzpatrick's mother Audrey - and Fitzpatrick's lawyer in Riviera del Sol was broken into and a laptop that was used in the search for Fitzpatrick was stolen. In addition, Fitzpatrick's Nokia mobile phone was stolen. The 32-year-old lawyer, Juan José de la Fuente Teixidó, said the burglars got into his property by forcing a locked garden gate. He said: "The stolen documents included confidential police reports about Fitzpatrick's disappearance. I believe the burglary was related to Fitzpatrick's disappearance. It makes no sense that they took documents which financially are worthless, and left behind all my expensive valuables like TVs, computers and music equipment."

== Ransom demand ==
In June 2009, Audrey Fitzpatrick received a telephone call from a man claiming he knew the location of Amy Fitzpatrick. Fitzpatrick described the caller as having an African accent and asking her if she was Fitzpatrick's mother. In an article published by expatriate newspaper Euro Weekly News, Audrey said:

He went on to say he knew where she was. She had been kidnapped and was in Madrid and the police were not to be involved. So I agreed, of course. He then said he'd ring me back with a name and address in two hours. Five hours later, after sitting with my phone in my hand and my heart in my mouth, I got a text to say, and I quote: 'Can you pay us 500,000 euro. Yes or no send your answer now and will send you all the info you need.' The phone number on this text is 672 564 687. I'll also give you the number he rang me on, too: 672 564 681.

Audrey Fitzpatrick commented that the Guardia Civil and her private investigators followed up on these numbers, but they were both pre-pay, and had never been registered.

== Later investigations ==
Audrey Fitzpatrick has taken on private investigators who have been working on Fitzpatrick's case since 2008. They are the same detectives who investigated the disappearance of Madeleine McCann. In May 2012, the Herald reported that a tip had been given to Gardaí that Irish convicted gangland murderer Eric "Lucky" Wilson had murdered her. Her parents believe that this particular piece of information is credible; however, a body is yet to be found. Amy was seen out with an older man on the night she disappeared who her family now believe was Wilson.

A police report from May 2011 claims three witnesses have come forward alleging they saw Amy with an unidentified blonde woman in the Trafalgar Bar in Calahonda's El Zoco centre hours after her previous last reported sighting.

Ahead of what would have been her 30th birthday, Fitzpatrick's parents sought to bring a practice of cold case reviews to the EU.

Amy's 23-year-old brother Dean Fitzpatrick was stabbed to death in Coolock, Dublin, in 2013 in an incident involving Dave Mahon, his mother's partner. On May 6, 2016, Dave Mahon was found not guilty of the murder but guilty of manslaughter. He was sentenced to 7 years in prison. He was released in July 2021 after serving 5 years. In August of 2021 he was arrested on suspicion of assaulting a man in his 70's. He was acquitted of the assault charge in March 2025. In 2023 Mahon published How Much Pain Can Our Hearts Endure, a 900 page book covering Fitzpatrick's disappearance and Dean's death.

== See also ==
- List of people who disappeared mysteriously (2000–present)

== Bibliography ==
- O'Toole, Michael; Fitzpatrick, Audrey; Mahon, Dave (2012). Please Find My Amy. Paperweight Publications. ISBN 978-1-908813-04-6.
- Mahon, David (13 December 2023). How Much Pain Can Our Hearts Endure. Woodbridge Publishers. ISBN 978-1-916849-27-3.
