= BBC Radio Solent =

BBC Local Radio service for Hampshire, Dorset and the Isle of Wight, England

- Southampton and Dorchester; England
- Broadcast area: Hampshire, Dorset and the Isle of Wight
- Frequencies: FM: 96.1 MHz (Hampshire, Isle of Wight and East Dorset); FM: 103.8 MHz (Central and West Dorset); DAB: 11B (Bournemouth); DAB: 11C (South Hampshire); Freeview: 714 (Hampshire); Freeview: 715 (Dorset)
- RDS: BBC SLNT

Programming
- Language: English
- Format: Local news, talk and music

Ownership
- Owner: BBC Local Radio, BBC South, BBC South West

History
- First air date: 31 December 1970
- Former frequencies: 999 MW; 1359 MW

Technical information
- Licensing authority: Ofcom

Links
- Website: www.bbc.co.uk/radiosolent/

BBC Radio Solent is the BBC's local radio station serving Hampshire, Dorset and the Isle of Wight, broadcasting on FM, DAB, digital TV and via BBC Sounds from studios on Havelock Road in Southampton.

According to RAJAR, the station has a weekly audience of 204,000 listeners and a 4.2% share as of September 2023.

== History ==
The station began broadcasting on 31 December 1970. It is named after The Solent, the area of sea between Southampton, Portsmouth and the Isle of Wight.

In 1996, Radio Solent expanded its coverage into West Dorset and South Dorset by taking over neighbouring BBC Dorset FM, which was formerly an opt-out of BBC Radio Devon.

In 2013, a new programme specifically for Dorset listeners on 103.8 FM was launched under the name Breakfast in Dorset, after campaigns for a more locally focused service. The programme is presented by Steve Harris from a studio complex in Dorchester and also broadcasts county-wide on DAB.

== Technical ==
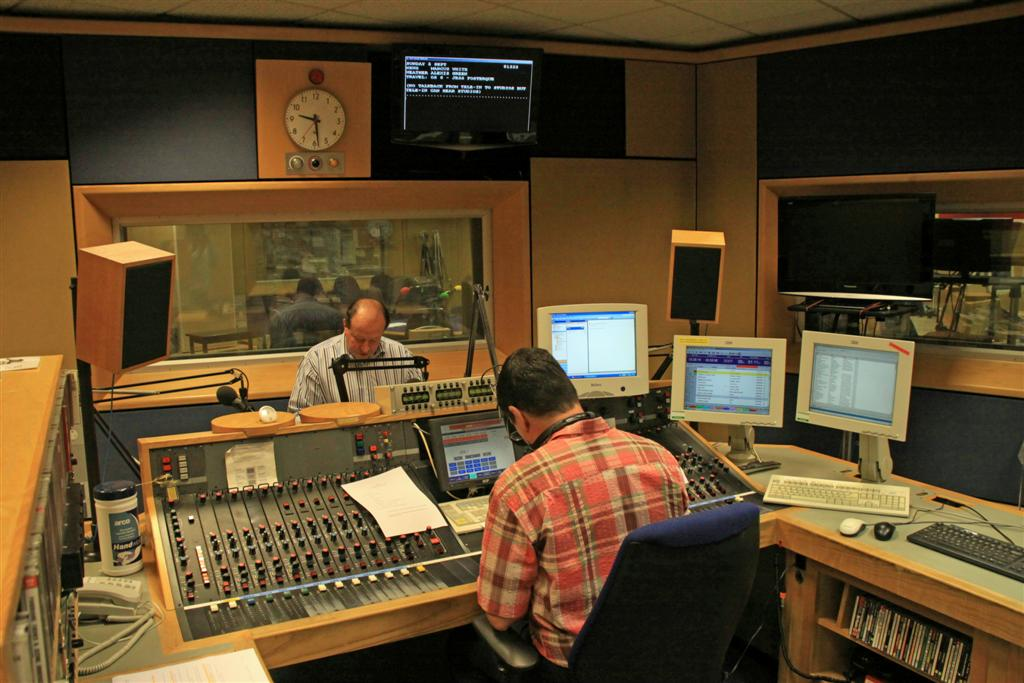
Former presenter Nick Girdler in an original BBC Radio Solent studio in Southampton

The service is broadcast on 96.1 FM for Hampshire, the Isle of Wight and eastern Dorset from Rowridge transmitting station on the Isle of Wight; and on 103.8 FM for western Dorset from Bincombe Hill transmitter. Since 2003, the station has also been broadcast on DAB Digital Radio from the NOW South Hampshire and NOW Bournemouth networks from thirteen transmitters between them.

The station also broadcasts on Freeview TV channels 714 (Hampshire / Isle of Wight) and 715 (Dorset) in the BBC South region, and streams online via BBC Sounds. Freeview TV channel 715 (Dorset) is also broadcast in the BBC South West and BBC West regions.

From launch until 2020, BBC Radio Solent broadcast on medium wave, with the main AM transmitter on 999 kHz from Fareham covering most of the coverage area and a secondary transmitter covering Bournemouth and Poole on 1359 kHz from Fern Barrow, Bournemouth.

=== North and north-east Hampshire ===
The signal for Hampshire on 96.1 FM from Rowridge on the Isle of Wight is weaker north of Winchester than the transmissions from other BBC Local Radio stations, so that the north Hampshire towns of Basingstoke and Andover are officially served by BBC Radio Berkshire, while towns such as Aldershot, Farnborough and Fleet in the north-east of the county are served by BBC Radio Surrey.

== Programming ==
As of 2023, local programming was produced and broadcast from the BBC's Southampton studios from 6 am to 6 pm each Monday to Friday and for sports coverage. Full speech content is required during the breakfast peak of 7 am to 8.30 am. The station must also provide at least 95 hours of locally made programming per week, that provides news, information and content relevant to the areas and communities it serves.

On weekdays, the station's 6 am to 10 am breakfast show, 10 am to 2 pm morning show and 2 pm to 6 pm afternoon show are broadcast solely to the station's broadcast area.

The station's Saturday and Sunday afternoon show is occupied by sports coverage under the BBC Radio Solent Sport banner. The Saturday evening 8 pm to 10 pm slot is occupied by the BBC Music Introducing programme which features music from new and up and coming artists from the local area. The show helped discover and launch the careers of Wet Leg and has featured artists such as Natives and Echotape.

During the station's downtime, BBC Radio Solent simulcasts overnight programming from BBC Radio 5 Live between 1 am and 6 am.

== Presenters ==
=== Notable past presenters ===
- Roger Day (DJ and presenter, left in 2012, now at Boom Radio)
- Kenny Everett (1972)
- Nick Girdler (1972–2006, 2009–2019)
- Nicky Horne (left in 2019, now at Boom Radio)
- Simon Jupp (former Member of Parliament for East Devon)
- Andrew Peach (now at BBC Radio Berkshire)
- John Piper (presented Piper's Tune throughout the 1970s, left to launch 2CR in Bournemouth)
- Carolyn Quinn (left to join BBC Radio 4)
- Richard Skinner (newsreader, left to join BBC Radio 1 in 1973)
- Sean Street (broadcaster, poet, writer, and Britain's first Professor of Radio)
- Sally Taylor (presenter on BBC South Today, worked for Radio Solent from 2006 to 2011)
- Peter White (the BBC's Disability Affairs Correspondent, worked for Radio Solent from 1970 to 2006)
