= Nick Girdler =

BBC radio broadcaster

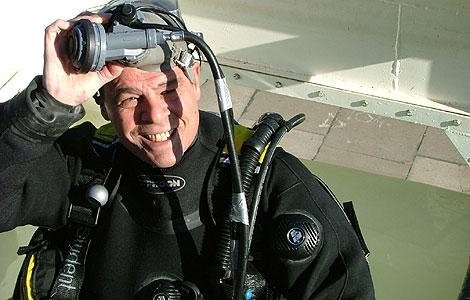
Nick Girdler underwater

Nick Girdler is a freelance radio broadcaster who worked for BBC Radio Solent from 1972 until 2006 and again from 2009 until 2019.

Following a short-lived retirement from 2006, on 3 June 2009, Radio Solent announced that he would be returning to the station on 14 June 2009, to host a Sunday morning (9 am to noon) programme.

Girdler presented his last programme on 24 February 2019 having purportedly been given just 10 days’ notice of termination of employment, as a result of changes to the Sunday morning line-up.

== Competitions ==
The BBC doesn't favour competitions any more, so "The Top Ten" is not a competition but a BBQ. It lasts for the duration of the three hour show, ie:

- The Top Ten Runs
  - Easy answer: Dexy's Midnight Runners
  - More difficult answer: The National Union Of Railworkers or NUR...which is RUN backwards!

The answers are often "off the planet" and a Top Ten has never been completed. Girdler always gives the answers at the end of the show with Number 10 being the most difficult and rarely guessed. "The Top Tens" are either made up by listeners, Girdler, his Producer Rebecca Parker or a combination of all three.

Former competitions include:

- Sod-u-ko - based on the popular new numbers game. If the listeners guess the correct number in the correct place, they are asked a general knowledge question. If they can't give the correct answer, it goes out for any listener to answer.
- Crossbar (or Son-of-Crossbar) - Nick gives clues to 5 words or phrases which intersect like a crossword, one word crossing the other four.
- Famous Five - clues are given for 5 words, one in each of 5 'drawers'; Julian, Dick, George, Ann and Timmy. Answers will either start or end with one of the letters in the name of its 'drawer'.
- Top 10 - this began when listeners completed a competition very quickly, so Nick invited them to guess his top 10 James Bond films. The top 10s have moved from being simply a factual list, to one involving wordplay and obscure information.
- The Hard One - a very hard question for which very little information is given initially. Further clues are given as time passes. 'The Hard One' originally ran until it was solved - often several weeks. Recently the 'Well-Hard One' has lasted only a week before the answer is revealed.

== Catchphrases ==
Over the years Girdler developed a set of stock phrases which he used regularly:

- Gordon Bennett - in place of any expletive
- Love this job - usually after a song he likes
- A bit whizzy - to describe anything remotely modern or impressive
- You're not listening fast enough - when a listener guesses an answer already given
- A bit "Balsamic" - infers a bit posh
- The beautiful Bevois Vallee - Reference to an area of Southampton, close to the studio, which is anything but beautiful, spelled Bevois Valley (pronounced Beavis Valley)

== Past Features ==
- The Girdler Line - listeners phone-in with requests for help after 10.30. Often Girdler will provide an answer, or if not a listener will usually provide one swiftly.
- The Newsdog - interviews a local person (usually with something to promote) at 10.00 every day, the second half of the interview is devoted to a review of the daily newspapers.
- The Bloke - Girdler's reference to the Sports bulletin whilst on the late shift.
- The Antidote to The Bloke -Girdler's apparent disinterest for sport meant that a soothing piece of classical music was always played after the Sports News.

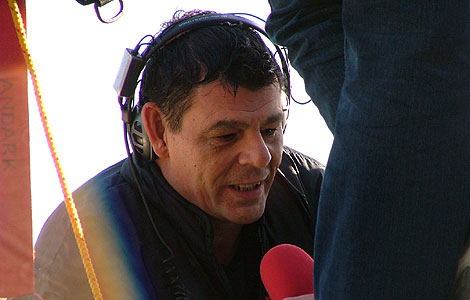
Nick Girdler moments after his failed record attempt

== Interests ==
Girdler is a keen sailor (his boat is called Seasaw) and sails in the Solent most weeks. Whenever Nick embarked on a DIY project, listeners were usually informed. Girdler had demonstrated an interest in underwater broadcasting for decades, and so on 4 November 2005 attempted a World record for sub-aqua radio broadcasting. Despite failing the attempt after 90 minutes, he did break the UK record.
