= Verah Falls =

- Origin: Portland, Oregon USA
- Genres: Post-hardcore, metalcore
- Years active: 2010 - 2014
- Labels: (Ex) BlkHeart
- Members: Jacob Krueger; Brian Van Buskirk; McCary McCutcheon; Dylan Williams; Ty Wenz
- Past members: Craig Prater; Graham Brown; Kyle Gilmer; Forrest Burton; Jacob Martin; James Ormsby
- Website: Verah Falls on Facebook

Verah Falls was an American post-hardcore band from Portland, Oregon. Formed in 2010 the group was signed to BlkHeart Group. Their debut EP, All Our Yesterdays, was released on June 7, 2011.

== History ==
Verah Falls was founded in the fall of 2010, by vocalist Craig Prater, and drummer Tyler Wenz, in Portland, Oregon. They asked friend Grant Slewitzke to help with a demo and, together with producer Stephan Hawkes, they recorded a track called "The cover up, uncovered" which was later used on the EP. They then went on a search to find the current line-up. The group went on to record a five-song EP at Interlace Audio in their hometown. After local touring, they received attention from BlkHeart Group and signed onto their roster that included Molotov Solution, Destruction Of A Rose and No Bragging Rights.

In June 2011, the band released their debut EP, All Our Yesterdays, on iTunes, to mixed reviews. The album was recorded by Craig Prater, Ty Wenz, Graham Brown, Kyle Gilmer, and Forrest Burton. Ryan Williford of online review site Audiopinions stated that, "The instrumental parts were well written and there is nothing here that is beyond their skill or them trying to force anything into a song. One of the best factors about the band is that nothing takes priority over another aspect of the sound", while Vic Vaughn of Metal review site MetalSucks simply stated that "Uh, wow, another shitty melodic emo-screamo hard-kee-yore band. It sucks. Ignore it."

In March 2014 vocalist Craig and bassist Timothee left the band. The band added new vocalist Jacob Krueger and bassist Dylan Williams and now perform under the name Like Vultures.

== Discography ==
Studio albums

Year	Album	Label(s)	Chart positions		
Year	Album	Label(s)	US	US Indie	US Heat
2011	All Our Yesterdays	BlkHeart Group	—	—	—
2012	"Divide"		—	—	—
2013	"Pariah"		—	—	—
2013	"Throat of the World"		—	—	—
2014	"Century"		—	—	—
