= The Endless River =

Studio album by Pink Floyd
- Released: 7 November 2014
- Recorded: 1969, 1993, 2013–2014
- Studios: Astoria; Britannia Row, Islington; Medina; Olympic
- Genres: Ambient; psychedelia; blues rock; progressive rock
- Length: 53:02
- Labels: Parlophone; Columbia
- Producers: David Gilmour; Phil Manzanera; Youth; Andy Jackson

Pink Floyd chronology
The Best of Pink Floyd: A Foot in the Door (2011)	The Endless River (2014)	1965: Their First Recordings (2015)

Singles from The Endless River
- 1. "Louder than Words" Released: 14 October 2014

The Endless River is the fifteenth and final studio album by the English rock band Pink Floyd, first released on 7 November 2014 by Parlophone Records in Europe and a few days later on Columbia Records in the rest of the world. It was the third Pink Floyd album recorded under the leadership of the guitarist, David Gilmour, and the first following the death of the keyboardist and songwriter, Richard Wright, who appears posthumously. It was produced by Gilmour, Youth, Andy Jackson and Phil Manzanera.

The Endless River is a double album consisting mainly of instrumental and ambient music drawn from material recorded during the sessions for the previous Pink Floyd album, The Division Bell (1994). Additional material was recorded in 2013 and 2014 on Gilmour's Astoria boat studio and in Medina Studios in Hove, England. Only one track, "Louder than Words", has lead vocals. After the death of the longtime Pink Floyd cover artist Storm Thorgerson in 2013, the cover was created by Ahmed Emad Eldin, design company Stylorouge, and Aubrey Powell, the co-founder of Thorgerson's design company Hipgnosis.

The Endless River was promoted with the "Louder than Words" single and artwork installations in cities around the world. It became the most pre-ordered album of all time on Amazon UK and debuted at number one in several countries. The vinyl edition was the fastest-selling UK vinyl release since 1997. The Endless River received mixed reviews: some critics praised the nostalgic mood, while others found it unambitious or meandering.

== Recording ==
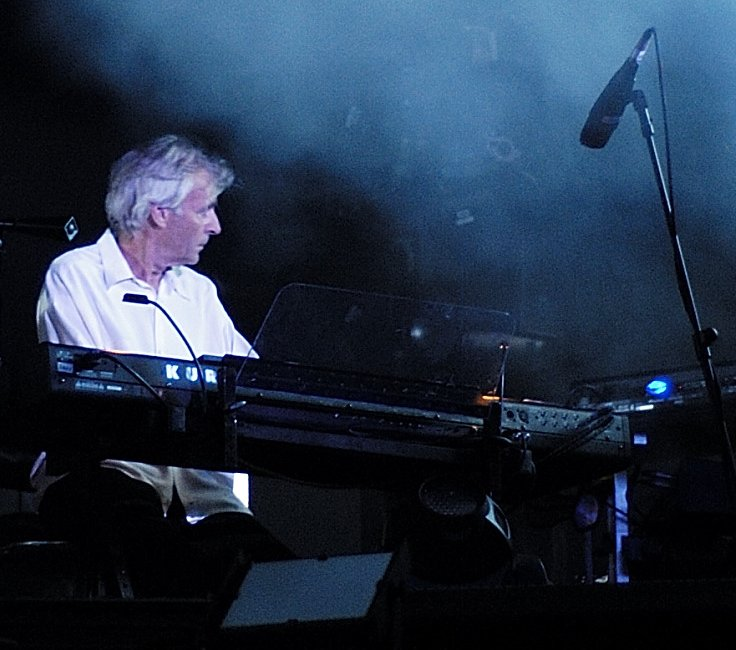
The Endless River was created as a tribute to Pink Floyd founding member Rick Wright, who died in 2008.

The Endless River is based on music recorded during the sessions for Pink Floyd's previous studio album, The Division Bell (1994). The Division Bell was recorded in 1993 and 1994 in Britannia Row Studios in London, and on the Astoria boat studio, belonging to guitarist David Gilmour. Pink Floyd recorded hours of music during the sessions; the engineer Andy Jackson edited it into an hour-long ambient composition tentatively titled The Big Spliff, but the band did not release it.

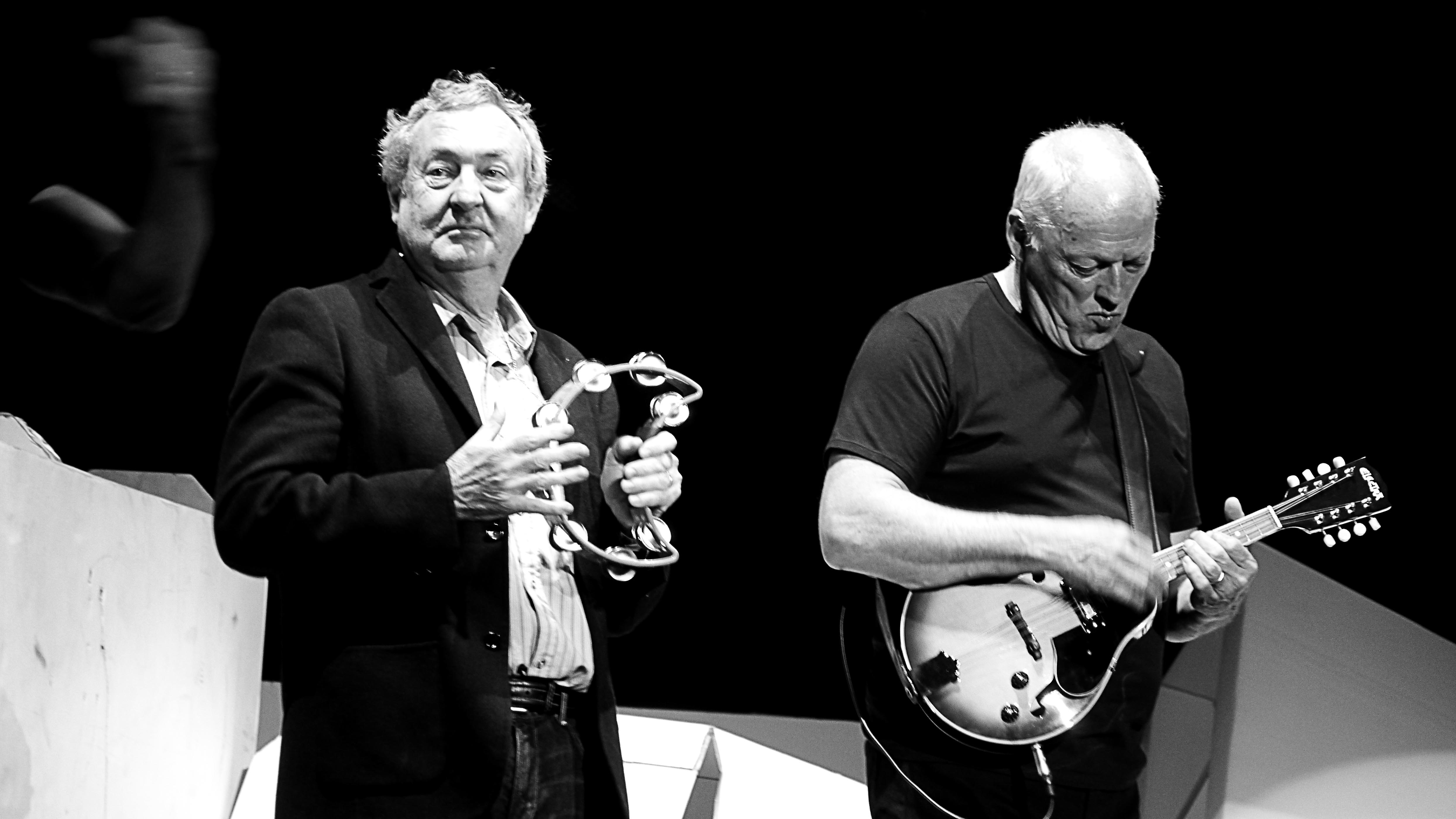
Drummer Nick Mason (left) and guitarist David Gilmour (right) took up the project in 2013, intending to create "a 21st-century Pink Floyd album".

Keyboardist Richard Wright died of cancer on 15 September 2008. In 2013, Gilmour and drummer Nick Mason decided to revisit the unused Division Bell recordings to make a new album, re–recording parts, adding new ones, and using modern studio technology. Gilmour said: "With Rick gone, and with him the chance of ever doing it again, it feels right that these revisited and reworked tracks should be made available as part of our repertoire." Only a small part of The Big Spliff was used. Two tracks from The Big Spliff are included on the deluxe version of the album as bonus tracks.

Gilmour asked guitarist and producer Phil Manzanera, who co-produced his 2006 solo album On an Island, to work on the material. Manzanera, Jackson, and engineer Damon Iddins spent six weeks assembling four 14-minute pieces. Gilmour gave two pieces to producer Youth, who added guitar and bass parts. In November 2013, Gilmour led sessions with Manzanera, Youth and Jackson to record material with Mason, saxophonist Gilad Atzmon and bassist Guy Pratt. Vocalists including Durga McBroom recorded backing vocals, and Gilmour recorded lead vocals on "Louder than Words", with lyrics by his wife, author Polly Samson. Bassist and songwriter Roger Waters, who left Pink Floyd in 1985, was not involved.

"Autumn '68", named in reference to the 1970 Pink Floyd song "Summer '68", features a recording of Wright playing the Royal Albert Hall pipe organ during the rehearsal for Pink Floyd's show at the Royal Albert Hall on 26 June 1969. "Talkin' Hawkin'" contains a sample of scientist Stephen Hawking's speech taken from a British Telecom commercial, which was also sampled for The Division Bell on "Keep Talking". Mason received writing credits for "Sum", and "Skins", a two-and-a-half-minute drum solo.

Gilmour said The Endless River would be Pink Floyd's last album, saying: "I think we have successfully commandeered the best of what there is ... It's a shame, but this is the end." Mason said it would likely be the last Pink Floyd album. In 2024, Gilmour said that The Endless River was not originally intended as "a properly paid-for Pink Floyd record" and that he had been "bullied by the record company".

== Composition ==
The Endless River comprises four pieces, which form a continuous flow of mostly ambient and instrumental music. Gilmour said: "Unapologetically, this is for the generation that wants to put its headphones on, lie in a beanbag, or whatever, and get off on a piece of music for an extended period of time. You could say it's not for the iTunes, downloading-individual-tracks generation." Mason described the album as a tribute to Wright: "I think this record is a good way of recognising a lot of what he does and how his playing was at the heart of the Pink Floyd sound. Listening back to the sessions, it really brought home to me what a special player he was."

"Louder than Words" is the only track with a lead vocal. Samson wrote the lyrics after observing the band's interaction during the rehearsals for their 2005 Live 8 reunion, their first performance with Waters in over 24 years. She said: "What struck me was, they never spoke ... It’s not hostile, they just don’t speak. And then they step onto a stage, and musically, that communication is extraordinary." The album title is taken from a lyric on the last track of The Division Bell, "High Hopes": "The water flowing / The endless river / For ever and ever." Gilmour said it suggested a continuum between the records.

== Packaging ==
The Endless River cover art depicts a young man punting a Thames skiff across a sea of clouds towards the sun. After the death of longtime Pink Floyd artist Storm Thorgerson in 2013, Pink Floyd collaborated with Aubrey Powell, co-founder of Thorgerson's design company Hipgnosis. Powell discovered 18-year-old Egyptian artist Ahmed Emad Eldin and asked to use the concept from his piece Beyond the Sky for The Endless River. Eldin was a Pink Floyd fan and accepted enthusiastically. Powell felt Ahmed's concept had "an instant Floydian resonance", and described it as "enigmatic and open to interpretation". The final cover is a recreation of Eldin's work by London design firm Stylorouge. Powell felt that the cover summed up the title and music, and was appropriate for the recording on the Thames.

The Endless River was also released in boxed DVD and Blu-ray "deluxe" editions, containing a 24-page hardback book, postcards, and a bonus disc of three additional tracks and six music videos. The DVD edition includes the album in Dolby Digital and DTS 5.1 surround sound, plus a 48 kHz /24 bit stereo version. The Blu-ray has DTS Master Audio and PCM, 96/24 5.1 surround and a PCM stereo 96/24 version.

== Promotion ==
Several art installations, such as this one in South Bank, London, were placed around the world in promotion of The Endless River.

Pink Floyd were affected by the sale of EMI to the Universal Music Group, which lasted from 2011 to 2013. The European Commission and the Federal Trade Commission approved the sale with conditions, including the sale of certain EMI assets. Pink Floyd, along with many other bands under the EMI roster, were transferred to different labels during the process. The Parlophone Label Group was formed under Parlophone as one of many assets to be sold off by Universal following the acquisition of EMI, with Pink Floyd transferred to the Parlophone Label Group during the sale. The Warner Music Group, in 2013, struck a deal with Universal to buy the Parlophone Label Group from EMI, acquiring publishing rights to Pink Floyd's back catalog and future releases in the process.

In a tweet on 5 July 2014, Samson released the album title and a projected release window of October 2014 to pre-empt a tabloid newspaper report. The announcement was followed by backing vocalist Durga McBroom posting a photo of her alongside Gilmour in the recording studio. Details about The Endless River were announced on Pink Floyd's website on 7 July.

Pink Floyd and Parlophone unveiled The Endless River on 22 September 2014, including the release date, artwork and track listing, accompanied by a promotional website, a hyperstitial for the Pink Floyd website. The site featured an artist's statement, photographs from the Division Bell sessions, pre-order details and two teasers, one featuring a 30-second snippet of "It's What We Do", and a television advertisement, featuring the album's geometric-based artwork. Pre-orders on physical and digital formats started the same day. Prominent installations of the album's artwork were placed around the world, including a four-sided 8m tall billboard placed in South Bank, London, and large-scale poster advertisements in cities such as Berlin, Paris, Los Angeles, Milan, New York and Sydney.

The only single, "Louder than Words", premiered on Chris Evans' breakfast show on BBC Radio 2 as a shortened radio edit. Gilmour and Mason appeared in an interview for BBC Radio 6 Music to promote the album and to discuss Wright's contributions. The track "Allons-y (1)" was made available to download from the iTunes Store on 4 November 2014. In the week before release, The Endless River became the most pre-ordered album in Amazon UK's history; the following week, the record was broken by III by Take That. There was no Endless River tour, as Gilmour said it was impossible without Wright.

== Critical reception ==
Professional ratings
Aggregate scores
Source	Rating
AnyDecentMusic?	5.4/10
Metacritic	58/100
Review scores
Source	Rating
AllMusic	3.5/5 stars
The Guardian	3/5 stars
The Independent	N/A
Record Collector	5/5 stars
NME	5/10
The Observer	4/5 stars
Pitchfork	5.7/10
PopMatters	6/10 medals
Rolling Stone	3.5/5 stars
Uncut	3.5/5 stars

On the review aggregator site Metacritic, The Endless River has a score of 58 based on 24 reviews, indicating "mixed or average reviews". Ludovic Hunter-Tilney of the Financial Times praised the nostalgic "Floydian" sound, reminiscent of Pink Floyd's work prior to The Wall (1979), and wrote: "How fitting that a band so accustomed to loss should close their account with an engrossing elegy to their own past." Cameron Cooper of The Music gave the album three and a half out of five, writing that it felt "less like a swansong and more like a final homage ... the lack of vocals gives the music more freedom, allowing it to speak for itself". In The Guardian, Alexis Petridis described it as "not a new album from an extant band, but an echo from the past – or a last, warm but slightly awkward group hug ... on those terms, it works just fine". He praised the lead single and final track "Louder than Words" as "stately, poignant and open-hearted". In Rolling Stone, David Fricke wrote:"Wright was the steady, binding majesty in the Floyd's explorations. This album is an unexpected, welcome epitaph." The Observer wrote that the album is "an understated affair but unmistakably the Floyd ... a pretty good way to call it a day."

J.C. Maçek III of PopMatters wrote: "Without the vocals, something is very clearly missing and the listener is left wanting more. While this makes for a good album, The Endless River is not quite fitting to serve as the final album of the greatest rock band of their kind, to say nothing of one of the greatest rock bands of any kind ever to perform." Andy Gill of The Independent called it "just aimless jamming, one long thread of Dave Gilmour's guitar against Rick Wright's pastel keyboards and Nick Mason's tentative percussion, with nary a melody of any distinction alighted upon for the duration .... without the sparking creativity of a Syd or Roger, all that's left is ghastly faux-psychedelic dinner-party muzak." The NME wrote that The Endless River was "a collection of spruced-up outtakes ... On those limited terms it works well enough, and it's interesting from a certain geeky perspective, but it's never quite as satisfying or substantial as you want it to be." Pitchfork wrote that The Endless River "is quintessentially and self-consciously Pink Floyd, for better or for worse ... it proves to be one of the few Pink Floyd releases that sounds like a step backwards, with nothing new to say and no new frontiers to explore." Mikael Wood of the Los Angeles Times called it "so excruciatingly dull (even by Pink Floyd's often-dull standards) that the band's name on the cover feels like a straight-up bait-and-switch".

== Commercial performance ==
In the week before its release, The Endless River displaced Four by One Direction as the most pre-ordered album of all time on Amazon UK. It debuted at number one on the UK Albums Chart, with sales totaling 139,351 the third highest opening sales week of 2014, making it Pink Floyd's sixth UK number one. As of 27 November 2014, the vinyl edition had sold 6,000 copies, making it the fastest-selling UK vinyl release of 2014 and the fastest-selling since 1997. The album also debuted at number one in several other countries, including France, Germany, Portugal, Ireland, the Netherlands, Belgium, New Zealand, and Canada. In the US, it debuted at number 3 on the Billboard 200 with 170,000 copies sold in its first week; by January 2015, it had sold 355,000 copies there. Worldwide, The Endless River sold over 2.5 million copies in 2014. Tracks from the album have been downloaded/viewed a total of over two hundred million times on Spotify, the top track being Things Left Unsaid with over 20 million plays.

== Track listing ==
All tracks produced by David Gilmour, Phil Manzanera, Youth and Andy Jackson.

Side one
No.	Title	Writer(s)	Length
1.	"Things Left Unsaid"	David Gilmour, Richard Wright	4:26
2.	"It's What We Do"	Gilmour, Wright	6:17
3.	"Ebb and Flow"	Gilmour, Wright	1:55
Total length:			12:38

Side two
No.	Title	Writer(s)	Length
1.	"Sum"	Gilmour, Wright, Nick Mason	4:48
2.	"Skins"	Gilmour, Wright, Mason	2:37
3.	"Unsung"	Wright	1:07
4.	"Anisina"	Gilmour	3:16
Total length:			11:48

Side three
No.	Title	Writer(s)	Length
1.	"The Lost Art of Conversation"	Wright	1:42
2.	"On Noodle Street"	Gilmour, Wright	1:42
3.	"Night Light"	Gilmour, Wright	1:42
4.	"Allons-y (1)"	Gilmour	1:57
5.	"Autumn '68"	Wright	1:35
6.	"Allons-y (2)"	Gilmour	1:32
7.	"Talkin' Hawkin'"	Gilmour, Wright	3:29
Total length:			13:39

Side four
No.	Title	Writer(s)	Length
1.	"Calling"	Gilmour, Anthony Moore	3:37
2.	"Eyes to Pearls"	Gilmour	1:51
3.	"Surfacing"	Gilmour	2:46
4.	"Louder than Words"	Gilmour, Polly Samson	6:36
Total length:			14:50 53:02

- The vinyl track listing is used regardless of format (CD, DVD, Blu-Ray, digital).

== Personnel ==
Adapted from the 2014 release

Pink Floyd

- David Gilmour – guitars (all tracks), EBow (1, 3, 10), lead vocals (18), backing vocals (7, 14, 17), keyboards (7, 15, 16), piano (6, 7), EMS VCS 3 (4, 6), bass guitar (2, 4, 7, 17), Hammond organ (18), percussion (8), voice samples (1)
- Nick Mason – drums (2, 4, 5, 7, 9, 11, 13, 14, 16, 17, 18), percussion (15, 18), rototoms (5), gong (5, 12, 16), voice samples (1)
- Richard Wright – Hammond organ (1, 11, 13, 16), Farfisa organ (4, 6, 14, 16), Royal Albert Hall Organ (12), piano (4, 6, 8, 14, 18), Rhodes piano (9, 18), electric piano (3), keyboards (1, 2, 5, 16, 17), synthesiser (1, 2, 8, 10, 14, 17, 18), voice samples (1, 18)

Additional musicians

- Guy Pratt – bass guitar (9, 14)
- Bob Ezrin – bass guitar (11, 13, 18), additional keyboards (1)
- Andy Jackson – bass guitar (5, 16), effects (15)
- Jon Carin – synthesisers (9, 11, 13), percussion loop (11, 13)
- Damon Iddins – additional keyboards (4, 12)
- Anthony Moore – keyboards (15)
- Gilad Atzmon – tenor saxophone (7), clarinet (7)
- Durga McBroom – backing vocals (14, 17, 18)
- Louise Marshall – backing vocals (18)
- Sarah Brown – backing vocals (18)
- Stephen Hawking – voice sample (14)
- Escala:
  - Chantal Leverton – viola (18)
  - Victoria Lyon – violin (18)
  - Helen Nash – cello (18)
  - Honor Watson – violin (18)

Production and design

- Bob Ezrin – co-producer (1993 sessions)
- David Gilmour – producer
- Phil Manzanera – producer
- Andy Jackson – producer, engineer, mixing, mastering of bonus content on DVD and Blu-ray
- Youth – producer, engineer, additional programming, sound design, assorted synthesisers and keyboards
- Eddie Bander – engineer, additional programming, sound design, assorted synthesisers and keyboards
- Michael Rendall – engineer, additional programming, sound design, assorted synthesisers and keyboards
- Damon Iddins – engineer
- James Guthrie – mastering for CD
- Joel Plante – mastering for CD
- Doug Sax – mastering for the vinyl issue
- Aubrey Powell – creative director
- Stylorouge – sleeve design
- Ahmed Emad Eldin – album cover concept

== Charts ==
=== Weekly charts ===
Weekly chart performance for The Endless River
Chart (2014–2015)	Peak position
Australian Albums (ARIA)	3
Austrian Albums (Ö3 Austria)	1
Belgian Albums (Ultratop Flanders)	1
Belgian Albums (Ultratop Wallonia)	1
Brazilian Albums (ABPD)	4
Canadian Albums (Billboard)	1
Croatian International Albums (HDU)	1
Czech Albums (ČNS IFPI)	1
Danish Albums (Hitlisten)	1
Dutch Albums (Album Top 100)	1
Finnish Albums (Suomen virallinen lista)	4
French Albums (SNEP)	1
German Albums (Offizielle Top 100)	1
Greek Albums (IFPI)	1
Hungarian Albums (MAHASZ)	3
Irish Albums (IRMA)	1
Israeli Albums Chart	1
Italian Albums (FIMI)	1
Japanese Albums (Oricon)	7
South Korean International Albums (Circle)	4
New Zealand Albums (RMNZ)	1
Norwegian Albums (VG-lista)	1
Polish Albums (ZPAV)	1
Portuguese Albums (AFP)	1
Scottish Albums (Official Charts)	1
Spanish Albums (Promusicae)	6
Swedish Albums (Sverigetopplistan)	1
Swiss Albums (Schweizer Hitparade)	1
UK Albums (Official Charts)	1
UK Rock & Metal Albums (OCC)	1
US Billboard 200	3
US Top Rock Albums (Billboard)	2

=== Year-end charts ===
2014 year-end chart performance for The Endless River
Chart (2014)	Position
Australian Albums (ARIA)	25
Austrian Albums (Ö3 Austria)	22
Belgian Albums (Ultratop Flanders)	10
Belgian Albums (Ultratop Wallonia)	8
Canadian Albums (Billboard)	43
Dutch Albums (Album Top 100)	5
French Albums (SNEP)	16
German Albums (Offizielle Top 100)	3
Italian Albums (FIMI)	2
New Zealand Albums (RMNZ)	8
Polish Albums (ZPAV)	3
South Korean International Albums (Gaon)	52
Swedish Albums (Sverigetopplistan)	47
Swiss Albums (Schweizer Hitparade)	8
UK Albums (OCC)	9
US Billboard 200	115
US Top Rock Albums (Billboard)	24

2015 year-end chart performance for The Endless River
Chart (2015)	Position
Belgian Albums (Ultratop Flanders)	41
Belgian Albums (Ultratop Wallonia)	33
Canadian Albums (Billboard)	17
Dutch Albums (Album Top 100)	48
French Albums (SNEP)	125
German Albums (Offizielle Top 100)	98
Hungarian Albums (MAHASZ)	30
Italian Albums (FIMI)	44
Swiss Albums (Schweizer Hitparade)	45
US Billboard 200	152
US Top Rock Albums (Billboard)	14

=== Decade-end charts ===
Decade-end chart performance for The Endless River
Chart (2010–2019)	Position
Germany (Official German Charts)	38

== Certifications ==
Region	Certification	Certified units/sales
Australia (ARIA)	Platinum	70,000^{^}
Austria (IFPI Austria)	Gold	7,500^{*}
Belgium (BRMA)	Gold	15,000^{*}
Brazil (Pro-Música Brasil) DVD	Platinum	30,000^{*}
Canada (Music Canada)	Platinum	89,000
Denmark (IFPI Danmark)	Gold	10,000^{^}
France (SNEP)	2× Platinum	200,000^{*}
Germany (BVMI)	3× Gold	300,000^{‡}
Hungary (MAHASZ)	Platinum	2,000^{^}
Italy (FIMI)	4× Platinum	200,000^{*}
Mexico (AMPROFON)	3× Platinum+Gold	210,000^{‡}
New Zealand (RMNZ)	Platinum	15,000^{^}
Norway (IFPI Norway)	Gold	15,000^{‡}
Poland (ZPAV)	3× Platinum	60,000^{‡}
Sweden (GLF)	Gold	20,000^{‡}
Switzerland (IFPI Switzerland)	Platinum	20,000^{^}
United Kingdom (BPI)	Platinum	300,000^{*}
United States (RIAA)	Gold	500,000^{^}
Summaries
Europe (IFPI)	Platinum	1,000,000^{*}
Worldwide (IFPI)	—	2,500,000
^{*} Sales figures based on certification alone.^{^} Shipments figures based on certification alone.^{‡} Sales+streaming figures based on certification alone.

== Release schedule ==
Release history for The Endless River
The Endless River
Region	Date	Format	Label	Catalogue no.
Australia	7 November 2014	Digital download	Columbia Records	none
Germany	7 November 2014	Digital download	Parlophone	none
France	10 November 2014	Digital download	Parlophone	none
United States	10 November 2014	Digital download	Columbia Records	none
United Kingdom	10 November 2014	Compact Disc	Parlophone / Warner Bros. Records	
United Kingdom	10 November 2014	Digital download	Parlophone / Warner Bros. Records	none
United Kingdom	10 November 2014	2x Vinyl	Parlophone / Warner Bros. Records	
Canada	11 November 2014	Digital download	Columbia Records	none

Release history for The Endless River deluxe edition
The Endless River deluxe edition
Region	Date	Format	Label	Catalogue no.
Germany	7 November 2014	Digital download	Parlophone	none
France	10 November 2014	Digital download	Parlophone	none
United States	10 November 2014	Digital download	Columbia Records	none
United Kingdom	10 November 2014	Compact Disc, DVD	Parlophone / Warner Bros. Records	
United Kingdom	10 November 2014	Compact Disc, Blu-ray	Parlophone / Warner Bros. Records	
United Kingdom	10 November 2014	Digital download	Parlophone / Warner Bros. Records	none
Canada	11 November 2014	Digital download	Columbia Records	none

== Adaptations ==
- Ian Emes, a British artist and film director, and Pink Floyd's original animator, created a film using The Endless River music that was released in 2019.

== See also ==
- List of music released posthumously
