= Ahmed Emad Eldin =

Egyptian digital artist

- أحمد عماد الدين
- Born: ِAhmed Emad Eldin; October 23, 1996 (age 30); Jeddah, Saudi Arabia
- Known for: Digital artist
- Notable work: Pink Floyd - The Endless River
- Website: ahmedemadeldin.com

The Endless River (2014), Eldin's design for the 2014 studio album.

Ahmed Emad Eldin (Arabic: أحمد عماد الدين) is an Egyptian digital artist who came to prominence as the designer of the sleeve of Pink Floyd's 2014 album The Endless River. In 2015, Emad Eldin was chosen by Adobe for their "25 Under 25" list. Emad Eldin has been described as "an acclaimed digital artist and photo manipulator whose work has been displayed all over, from museums to the sleeve of Pink Floyd's album The Endless River" and who "has made a name for himself in the global digital art space" often producing "commercial work" though "much of his artwork comes from his own dreams." Emad Eldin is an Oniros Film Awards winner. His work has been part of exhibitions, including the "Bad Consumers" exhibition at Doge's Palace, Genoa and "Kahlil Gibran: Guide for our Times" at Sotheby's Gallery in London, "featuring nine Egyptian artists, along with 38 others from across the Middle East."

== Life ==
Emad Eldin was born October 23, 1996, and grew up in Jeddah, Saudi Arabia (with the exception of three years he and his family spent in Egypt); his parents are both Egyptian. Emad Eldin has been an artist since the age of 13, stating that he is "self-taught and... learned from YouTube and many other websites." He cites Salvador Dalí as an influence.

Emad Eldin is an undergraduate student in Pharmacy at Future University in Egypt.

== Career ==
=== The Endless River ===
Pink Floyd's creative team, led by Aubrey Powell, discovered Ahmed on the art portfolio website Behance. One of Ahmed's designs was chosen as the cover for the band's The Endless River album. Powell, the late Storm Thorgerson's partner at the Hipgnosis design studio, stated that when they "saw Ahmed’s image it had an instant Floydian resonance," citing its "enigmatic" qualities as well as how Emad Eldin's work is open to interpretation."

In an article in the UK's The Independent, Ahmed described what inspired the design Powell chose for The Endless River album cover: "Thinking about life and nature and what is beyond the world of charming factors we have never seen is enough to create millions of different amazing feelings." Ahmed has stated that he created the image on the cover of The Endless River on 3 October 2013 and that it was originally titled "Beyond the Sky."

As stated in the band's press announcement, once chosen, Ahmed's "concept for the powerful imagery of a man rowing on a 'river' of clouds was ... re-created by Stylorouge, [the] award-winning UK design agency," adding that "Pink Floyd's album artwork, mostly created by Storm Thorgerson of Hipgnosis, is as legendary as the band's music" but that "with Storm's passing in 2013, the task of finding an image that carried on Storm's legacy passed to Aubrey 'Po' Powell, Storm's original partner in Hipgnosis."

=== Other albums ===
Emad Eldin has dome album cover artwork for Massar Egbari (2015), Hamza Namira (2018), and Basata (2018). Emad Eldin also collaborated with Juno Records artist Tim Green, influencing the overall concept of his album "Her Future Ghosts" (2018).

=== Film poster art ===
Emad Eldin has produced poster art for the films Clash (2016), Stray (2017), and Heavy Rain (2018). Emad Eldin received an Orinos Film Awards recognition in 2018 in the category of "Best Poster" for "Heavy Rain."
