= John Piper (broadcaster) =

John Piper was the mid-morning host on BBC Radio Solent throughout the 1970s. His programme was called Piper's Tune. The show had a huge following, and consisted of a mix of music, guests and the regular feature, "Give a Neighbour a Hand," in which listeners would offer advice to people who called in asking for help. In 1979, Piper left BBC Radio Solent to join Two Counties Radio in Bournemouth, as the station's first Programme Controller. He was involved with a programme called Without Walls in 1995. He remained on the air until he retired to Spain with his wife, Dilys. Piper also served as mayor of his home town, Sitio de Calahonda, near Málaga, in the latter half of the 1980s. Piper was also a journalist and naturalist who served in Special Operations during World War II.
