= Maximum Security (Alien Sex Fiend album) =

Studio album by Alien Sex Fiend
- Released: October 1985
- Recorded: 1985
- Genre: Gothic rock; industrial rock
- Length: 42:42
- Label: Anagram
- Producer: Alien Sex Fiend

Alien Sex Fiend chronology
Acid Bath (1984)	Maximum Security (1985)	"It" the Album (1986)

Maximum Security is the third studio album by English rock band Alien Sex Fiend, released in October 1985 by Anagram Records.

== Release ==
Maximum Security peaked at No. 100 in the UK Albums Chart, and is to date their only charting album.

The record was reissued in 1986 in CD format, retitled as The First Alien Sex Fiend Compact Disc and featuring four additional tracks including the single "E.S.T. (Trip to the Moon)". The entire album appeared on the B-side of the 1986 cassette "It" the Cassette.

== Reception ==
Professional ratings
Review scores
Source	Rating
AllMusic	3/5 stars

Trouser Press described the album as "bleak and predominantly slow" and that it "suffers from a somewhat monotonous sameness".

== Track listing ==
Side A
No.	Title	Length
1.	"I'm Doing Time in a Maximum Security Twilight Home"	6:01
2.	"Mine's Full of Maggots"	5:44
3.	"Do You Sleep?"	4:03
4.	"In and Out of My Mind"	4:45

Side B
No.	Title	Length
1.	"Spies"	4:45
2.	"Fly in the Ointment"	3:45
3.	"Seconds to Nowhere"	2:34
4.	"The Beaver Destroys Forests"	1:28
5.	"Do You Sleep? (Version)"	3:58
6.	"Depravity Lane (Think I'll Take a Trip...)"	5:39
Total length:		42:42

CD reissue bonus tracks
No.	Title	Length
11.	"E.S.T. (Trip to the Moon) (7" Version)"
12.	"Boneshaker Baby"
13.	"Ignore the Machine (Electrode Mix)"
14.	"Attack!!! (12" Version)"
