= Another Planet =

Studio album by Alien Sex Fiend
- Released: 14 November 1988
- Recorded: 1988
- Genre: Gothic rock; industrial rock
- Length: 39:37
- Label: Anagram
- Producer: Alien Sex Fiend

Alien Sex Fiend chronology
Here Cum Germs (1987)	Another Planet (1988)	Curse (1990)

Another Planet is the sixth studio album by the English rock band Alien Sex Fiend. It was released in 1988 by Anagram Records.

== Release ==
The cassette and CD versions included the bonus track "Satisfaction", a cover of the Rolling Stones song.

The CD was reissued in the UK in 2005.

== Reception ==
Professional ratings
Review scores
Source	Rating
AllMusic	3/5 stars

Trouser Press qualified the album as "extremely entertaining". The Chicago Tribune called it "an LP of strange, well-done dance-floor fare that relies as much on biting, astringent guitar and murderous drumming as on synth-generated thumps and thweeps."

== Track listing ==
Side A
No.	Title	Length
1.	"Bun-Ho!"	1:43
2.	"Everybodys Dream"	3:51
3.	"Radiant City"	4:11
4.	"Spot Your Lucky Warts"	0:16
5.	"Sample My Sausage"	2:38
6.	"Outer Limits"	1:54
7.	"Instant Karma Sutra"	7:13

Side B
No.	Title	Length
1.	"So Much to Do – So Little Time"	4:23
2.	"Alien"	4:14
3.	"Wild Green Fiendy Liquid"	0:17
4.	"Nightmare Zone"	4:03
5.	"Bun-Ho! (Time After Time)"	2:52
6.	"Another Planet"	3:58

CD bonus tracks
No.	Title	Length
14.	"Silver Machine"
15.	"Satisfaction"
