= Who's Been Sleeping in My Brain =

Studio album by Alien Sex Fiend
- Released: 25 November 1983
- Recorded: 1–14 September 1983 at Aosis Studios, London, England
- Genre: Gothic rock
- Length: 43:33
- Label: Anagram
- Producer: Youth

Alien Sex Fiend chronology
Who's Been Sleeping in My Brain (1983)	Acid Bath (1984)

Who's Been Sleeping in My Brain is the debut studio album by English rock band Alien Sex Fiend. It was released on 25 November 1983 by Anagram Records. It was produced by Martin "Youth" Glover.

== Track listing ==
All tracks are written by Alien Sex Fiend (Christine Wade, David James, Johnnie Freshwater and Nicholas Wade).

Side A
No.	Title	Length
1.	"Wish I Woz a Dog"	6:38
2.	"Wild Women"	3:15
3.	"I'm Not Mad"	4:25
4.	"New Christian Music"	5:50
5.	"Wigwam Wipe Out"	2:50

Side B
No.	Title	Length
1.	"I'm Her Frankenstein"	2:40
2.	"I Am a Product"	4:20
3.	"Ignore the Machine"	6:30
4.	"Lips Can't Go"	5:40
5.	"Black Rabbit"	1:25
Total length:		43:33

== Reception ==
Professional ratings
Review scores
Source	Rating
AllMusic	3/5 stars

Who's Been Sleeping in My Brain was generally well received. Trouser Press called it "a charming collection of psychopunk".

== Personnel ==
Alien Sex Fiend

- Nik Fiend (Nicholas Wade) – vocals
- Mrs. Fiend (Christine Wade) – keyboards
- Yaxi Highrizer (David James) – guitar
- Johnnie Ha-Ha (Johnnie Freshwater) – drums

Technical

- Youth – production
- John Lee – engineering
- Trigger – engineering
