= "It" the Album =

Studio album by Alien Sex Fiend
- Released: October 1986
- Recorded: 1986
- Length: 46:03
- Label: Anagram
- Producer: Alien Sex Fiend, Pete McGhee

Alien Sex Fiend chronology
Maximum Security (1985)	"It" the Album (1986)	Here Cum Germs (1988)

"It" the Album is the fourth studio album by English rock band Alien Sex Fiend, released in October 1986 by Anagram Records.

== Content ==
The album cover was painted by frontman Nik Fiend.

== Release ==
The 1986 cassette version ("It" the Cassette) also included the band's full 1985 album Maximum Security.

The album was later reissued in CD format with three additional tracks and retitled It (The CD).

== Reception ==
Professional ratings
Review scores
Source	Rating
AllMusic	3/5 stars

Trouser Press called the album "unquestionably the group's most creative, mind-expanding undertaking".

== Track listing ==
Side A
No.	Title	Length
1.	"Smells Like..."	5:49
2.	"Manic Depression"	13:13
3.	"Believe It or Not"	4:40

Side B
No.	Title	Length
1.	"April Showers"	9:15
2.	"Wop Bop"	3:42
3.	"Get into It"	3:43
4.	"Lesson One"	3:35
5.	"Do It Right"	5:03
6.	"To Be Continued..."	0:42

CD reissue bonus tracks
No.	Title	Length
10.	"Buggin' Me..."	3:39
11.	"Hurricane Fighter Plane" (Red Krayola cover)	6:48
12.	"It Lives Again"	3:46
