= Alien Sex Fiend =

English rock band

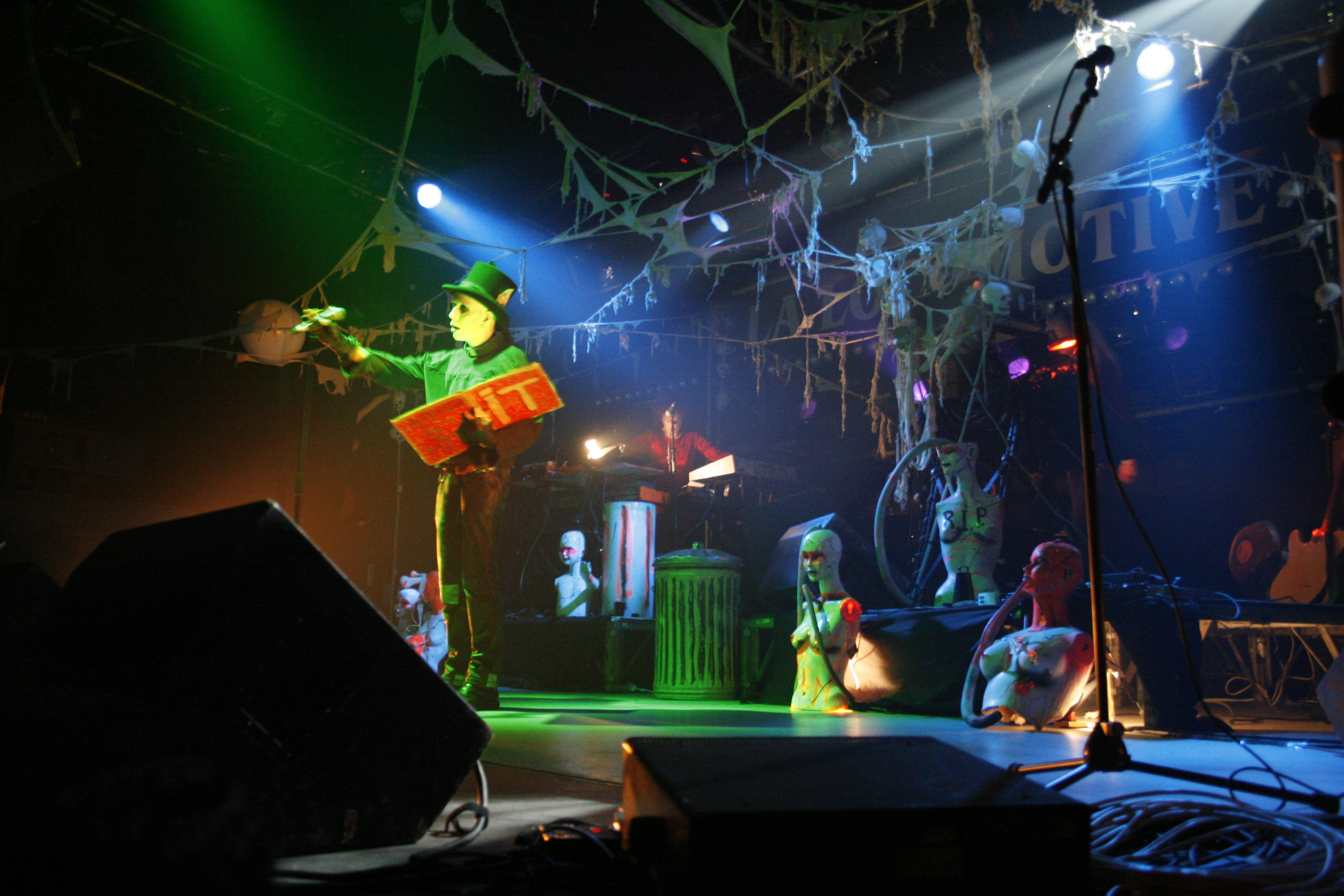
- Alien Sex Fiend in 2007

Background information
- Origin: London, England
- Genres: Deathrock; gothic rock; industrial; post-punk
- Years active: 1982–present
- Labels: Anagram, 13th Moon, Flicknife
- Members: Nik Fiend; Mrs. Fiend
- Past members: Yaxi Highrizer; Johnny Ha-Ha; Rat Fink Jr. Doc Milton

Alien Sex Fiend is an English rock band, formed in London in 1982. The current lineup of the band consists of Nik Fiend and Mrs. Fiend. Five of the group's albums and 12 of their singles reached top 20 positions in the UK indie charts in the period up to 1987.

== History ==
Alien Sex Fiend were formed by Nicholas Wade (Nik Fiend), Christine Wade (Mrs Fiend), David James (Yaxi Highrizer) and John Freshwater (Johnnie Ha Ha) in late 1982 at the Batcave club in London (where Nik worked). The band became known in the gothic scene for its dark, electronic industrial-leaning sound, heavy samples, loops, dub remixes and manic vocals.

Nik Wade had previously been a member of the Alice Cooper-influenced bands the Earwigs and Mr & Mrs Demeanour, and later the punk band Demon Preacher (later known as the Demons). Demon Preacher's drummer was Razzle, who later became famous in Hanoi Rocks.

Alien Sex Fiend recorded a cassette (The Lewd, the Mad, the Ugly and Old Nick) with Youth of Killing Joke, which brought them to the attention of the UK music press, along with the appearance of their track "R.I.P." on the Batcave club compilation, The Batcave: Young Limbs and Numb Hymns 1983, released by London Records in 1983.

They signed to the Cherry Red sub-label Anagram Records, releasing their first single, "Ignore the Machine", in August 1983. The single was immediately successful on the UK Independent Chart, reaching No. 6. Their debut studio album, Who's Been Sleeping in My Brain, was released by Anagram on 1 November 1983, followed by Acid Bath in 1984. They released the world's first 11" single, "E.S.T. (Trip to the Moon)", that October.

The band also recorded two BBC Peel Sessions in 1984. At the May session, they recorded "Attack!!!", "Dead and Buried", "Ignore the Machine" and "Hee Haw"; at the August session, "In God We Trust", "E.S.T. (Trip to the Moon)" and "Boneshaker Baby".

In October 1985, their third studio album Maximum Security reached No. 100 on the UK Albums Chart and remained there for the week of 12 October. They also had two top 100 singles with "Dead and Buried" in August 1984 (No. 91) and a reissued "Ignore the Machine" in March 1985 (No. 99). Throughout the early 1980s, their work was frequently in the UK Indie Chart and remained a fixture on American college radio.

The band also became popular in Japan, and in 1985, they released a live album recorded there, Liquid Head in Tokyo. Freshwater left later in 1985, and the band continued as a trio, supporting Alice Cooper on his "The Nightmare Returns" tour in 1986 and releasing "It" the Album that October. The band was reduced to a duo of the Wades when James left following the release of 1987's Here Cum Germs.

In early 1988, the band, as the Dynamic Duo, recorded a one-off 12" single "Batman Theme" with recording and live engineer Len Davies, before continuing as Alien Sex Fiend, incorporating electronics and sampling even more into their sound on the album Another Planet, released in November 1988. They reverted to a four-piece with the 1989 addition of two prior guest collaborators, drummer/guitarist Andrew Wilson (a.k.a. Rat Fink Jr., formerly of the Turnpike Cruisers) and keyboardist/guitarist Simon "Doc" Milton, who made their official debut on that year's Too Much Acid? double-live album. Their seventh studio album, Curse, was released in October 1990.

Fink and Milton departed in 1992, following that year's Open Head Surgery album and its subsequent tour (documented on The Altered States of America live album).

The Wades then became a duo once again and provided the soundtrack for the Digital Image Design game Inferno in 1994. Trouser Press said of the album, "Inferno... is styled less as electronic dance music than as burbling loops to accompany the action. Created with a delicate hand, much of the music is pleasant going on lovely, resembling early Depeche Mode or OMD."

In the mid 1990s, the band's video for "Zombified" appeared on the MTV show, Beavis and Butthead, subjected to their usual commentary.

In 1996, the Wades launched their own 13th Moon label, issuing three further albums: Nocturnal Emissions (1997), Information Overload (2004) and Death Trip (2010).

On 9 November 2018, Alien Sex Fiend released Possessed, their first album in eight years, on Cherry Red.

== Music style ==
Alien Sex Fiend has been described as gothic rock, deathrock and industrial. Glenn Danzig has cited the group's sonorous and echoing sounds as having influenced the mixing for several of the recordings for his group Samhain.

== Later projects ==
Fink published a book in 2000, Once Upon a Fiend, recalling his experiences in the band. He later drummed for Blackpool bands United States of Mind and Dog Food before joining Uncle Fester in 1999, who changed their name to UFX in 2006. Fink currently serves as frontman of Vince Ripper and the Rodent Show, a duo also featuring Vince "Ripper" Cornwall. They perform Alien Sex Fiend and the Cramps material, and have released two albums, It's Fun to Be a Monster and Boneyard a Go Go!!!.

== Discography ==
Studio albums

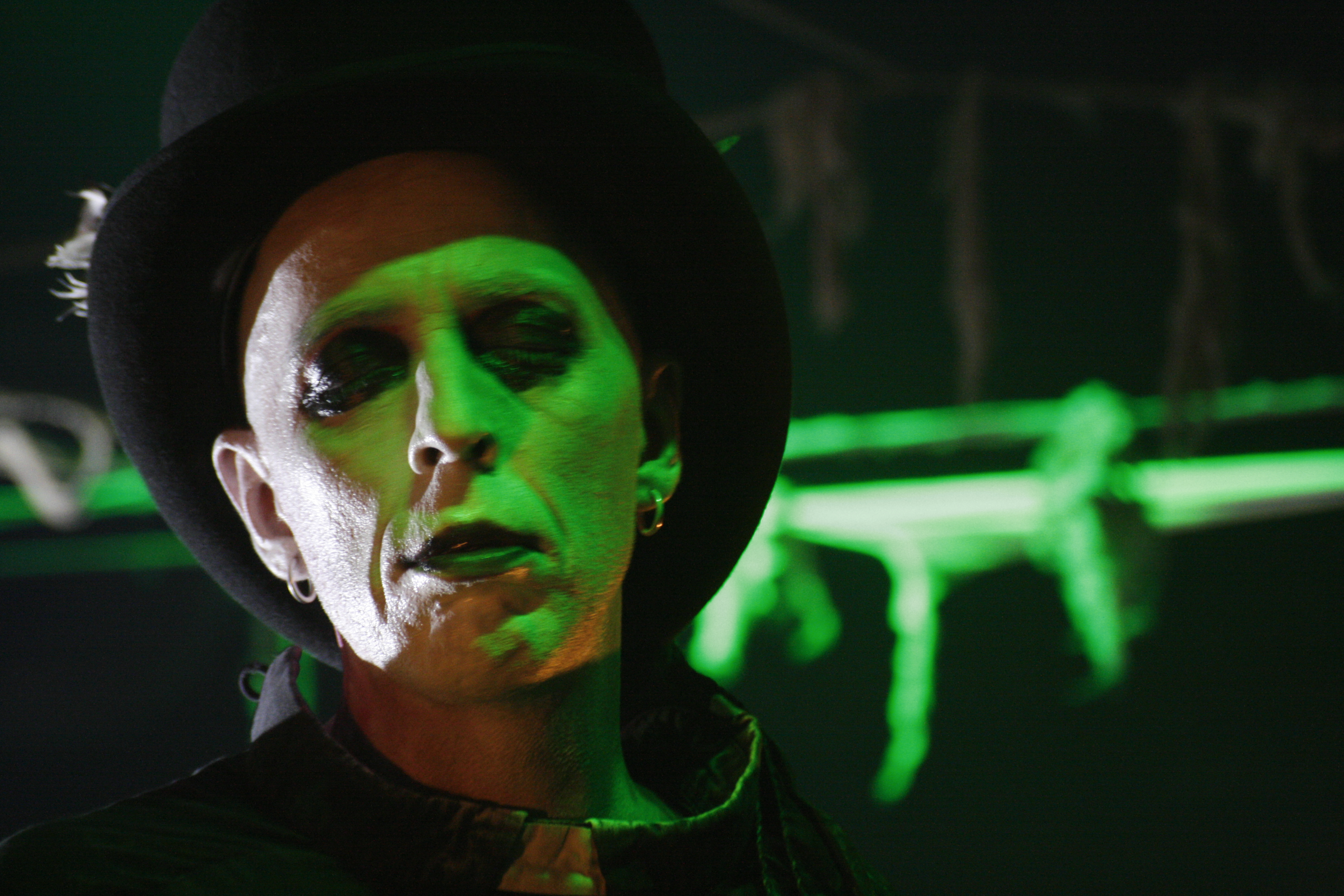
Alien Sex Fiend live in Paris, 2007

- Who's Been Sleeping in My Brain (1983)
- Acid Bath (1984)
- Maximum Security (1985)
- "It" the Album (1986)
- Here Cum Germs (1987)
- Another Planet (1988)
- Curse (1990)
- Open Head Surgery (1992)
- Inferno (1994)
- Nocturnal Emissions (1997)
- Information Overload (2004)
- Death Trip (2010)
- Possessed (2018)
