= Here Cum Germs =

Studio album by Alien Sex Fiend
- Released: 5 October 1987
- Recorded: 1987
- Length: 33:08
- Label: Anagram

Alien Sex Fiend chronology
"It" the Album (1986)	Here Cum Germs (1987)	Another Planet (1988)

Here Cum Germs is the fifth studio album by English rock band Alien Sex Fiend, released in 1987 by Anagram Records.

== Reception ==
Professional ratings
Review scores
Source	Rating
AllMusic	2/5 stars

Trouser Press described the album as "hastily recorded but competent".

== Track listing ==
Side A
No.	Title	Length
1.	"The Impossible Mission"	4:24
2.	"Here Cum Germs (Ravi-Mix #9)"	3:30
3.	"Isolation"	2:56
4.	"My Brain Is in the Cupboard – Above the Kitchen Sink"	7:07

Side B
No.	Title	Length
1.	"You Are Soul"	3:35
2.	"Death"	5:58
3.	"Boots On!"	5:38
