= All Our Yesterdays (EP) =

EP by Verah Falls
- Released: June 7, 2011
- Genre: Post-hardcore, metalcore
- Length: 21:15
- Label: BlkHeart
- Producer: Stephan Hawkes

Professional ratings
Review scores
| Source | Rating |
|---|---|
| Audiopinions | 8/10 stars |
| Metal Sucks | Negative |

All Our Yesterdays is the debut EP by American post-hardcore band, Verah Falls. Released on June 7, 2011.

== Reception ==
The album received mixed reviews. Ryan Williford of online review site Audiopinions stated that "The instrumental parts were well written and there is nothing here that is beyond their skill or them trying to force anything into a song. One of the best factors about the band is that nothing takes priority over another aspect of the sound.", while Vic Vaughn of Metal review site MetalSucks simply stated that "Uh, wow, another shitty melodic emo-screamo hard-kee-yore band. It sucks. Ignore it."

== Track listing ==
| No. | Title | Length |
|---|---|---|
| 1. | "Season Tickets to the Opera" | 3:49 |
| 2. | "Portland: Stay Golden" | 4:10 |
| 3. | "The Coverup (Uncovered)" | 3:57 |
| 4. | "So I Hear You Start Riots" | 4:04 |
| 5. | "A Family Affair" | 5:22 |
| Total length: | | 21:15 |

== Personnel ==
Verah Falls

- Craig Prater - Vocals
- Tyler Wenz - Drums
- Kyle Gilmer - Guitar
- Forrest Burton - Guitar
- Graham Brown - Bass

Production

- Production, recording and mixing by Stephan Hawkes
