= Acid Bath (album) =

Studio album by Alien Sex Fiend
- Released: 1984
- Recorded: August 1984
- Studio: Aosis Studios, London, England
- Genre: Gothic rock; industrial rock
- Length: 45:50
- Label: Anagram
- Producer: Kevin Armstrong

Alien Sex Fiend chronology
Who's Been Sleeping in My Brain (1983)	Acid Bath (1984)	Maximum Security (1985)

Professional ratings
Review scores
Source	Rating
AllMusic	2/5 stars

Acid Bath is the second studio album by English rock band Alien Sex Fiend, released in 1984 by Anagram Records. It was produced by Kevin Armstrong.

== Reception ==
Trouser Press described the album as "an inspired dose of mesmerizing, brain-frying insanity".

== Track listing ==
Side A
No.	Title	Length
1.	"In God We Trust (In Cars You Rust?)"	4:25
2.	"Dead and Re-Buried"	6:23
3.	"She's a Killer"	6:24
4.	"Hee-Haw (Here Come the Bone People)"	5:55
Total length:		22:37

Side B
No.	Title	Length
5.	"Smoke My Bones"	0:40
6.	"Break Down and Cry (Lay Down and Die – Goodbye)"	6:50
7.	"E.S.T. (Trip to the Moon)"	8:10
8.	"Attack!!!!!! #2"	6:12
Total length:		22:15

CD
No.	Title	Length
5.	"Bone Shaker Baby"	4:07
Total length:		48:26

== Personnel ==
Alien Sex Fiend

- Nik Fiend – bass, tape sampling, vocals
- Yaxi – guitars, bass
- Mrs. Fiend – keyboards, synthesizers, piano
- Johnnie Ha-Ha – drums, percussion, drum programming
