= Curse (Alien Sex Fiend album) =

Studio album by Alien Sex Fiend
- Released: 24 September 1990
- Length: 44:36
- Label: Anagram
- Producer: Alien Sex Fiend

Alien Sex Fiend chronology
Another Planet (1988)	Curse (1990)	Open Head Surgery (1992)

Curse is the seventh studio album by English rock band Alien Sex Fiend, released in September 1990 by Anagram Records.

== Reception ==
Professional ratings
Review scores
Source	Rating
AllMusic	2/5 stars
Trouser Press	favourable

AllMusic wrote that the album is "just as invigorating, funny and flesh-crawling as always, though it's a much more technological ASF than ever before".

== Track listing ==
Side A
No.	Title	Length
1.	"Katch 22 (You/Along Cums Reality/Hubble Bubble/Goodbye to Space)"	11:56
2.	"Now I'm Feeling Zombiefied"	9:15
Total length:		20:47

Side B
No.	Title	Length
3.	"Stress"	2:20
4.	"Blessings of the State (Extended Mix)"	5:52
5.	"Eat! Eat! Eat! (An Eye for an Eye)"	5:45
6.	"Ain't Got Time to Bleed"	4:11
7.	"Dali-isms"	0:10
8.	"Burger Bar Baby"	0:58
9.	"I Think I"	4:06
Total length:		25:45

CD bonus tracks
No.	Title	Length
7.	"Bleeding Reprise"
11.	"Mad Daddy Drives a U.F.O."
12.	"Wuthering Wind"
13.	"Radio Jimi"
14.	"Hands of the Silken"
15.	"Blessing in Disguise"
Total length:		59:27
