= Sitio de Calahonda =

Town in Andalusia, southern Spain

Coordinates: 36°29′43.35″N 4°43′32″W

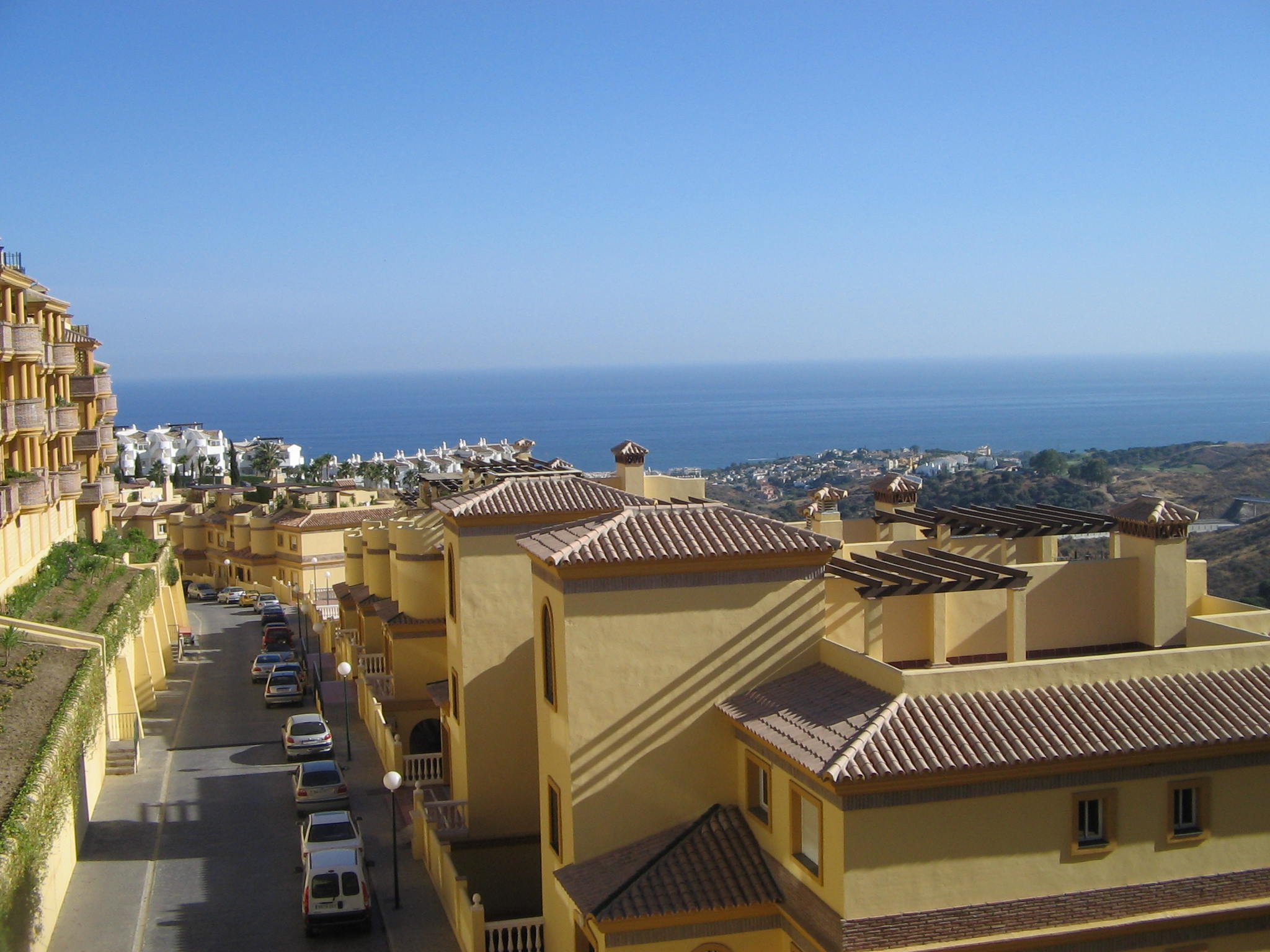
View of Calahonda.

Sitio De Calahonda is a town in Andalusia, southern Spain. It lies on the coast about halfway between Fuengirola and Marbella, and is part of the municipality of Mijas.

== History ==
The town was developed by D. Juan de Orbaneja in 1963, occupying the space between Marbella and Mijas.

The town was affected by wildfires on September 11 and 12 of 2011, and again in September 2012.
