= List of songs about or referencing serial killers =

This is a list of songs about or referencing serial killers. The songs are divided into groups by the last name of the killer the song is about or mentions.

== A–B ==
=== Axeman of New Orleans ===
- "Axeman Jazz (Don't Scare Me Papa)" - Squirrel Nut Zippers
- The Axeman's Jazz - Beasts of Bourbon
- "Axtmann" - Eisregen
- "The Mysterious Axman's Jazz (Don't Scare Me Papa)" – Joseph John Davilla

=== Joe Ball ===
- "Joe Ball was his name" – Macabre

=== Elizabeth Báthory ===
- "An Execution" – Siouxsie and the Banshees
- "Bathe in Blood" – Evile
- "Báthory Erzsébet" - Sunn O)))
- "Beauty Through Order" – Slayer
- "The Bleeding Baroness" – Candlemass
- "Blissfully Exsanguinated" - Defeated Sanity
- "Countess Bathory" - Venom
- "Countess Erszebeth Nadasdy" – Barathrum
- Cruelty and the Beast album by Cradle of Filth
- Die Blutgräfin album by Untoten
- "Elizabeth" – Aiden
- "Elizabeth" – Ghost
- Elizabeth album – Kamelot
- "Elizabeth Bathory" – Tormentor
- "Rose of Pain" – X Japan
- "To the Memory of the Dark Countess" – Mütiilation
- "Torquemada 71" – Electric Wizard
- "Woman of Dark Desires" – Bathory
- "The Wrath of Satan's Whore" – Countess

=== Robert Berdella ===
- "Diary of Torture" – Macabre

=== David Berkowitz ===
- ".44 Magnum Opus" - Exodus
- "6 Foot 7 Foot" - Lil Wayne feat. Cory Gunz
- "Bay of Pigs" – The Acacia Strain
- "Black Privilege" - Dr. Dre
- "Cereal Killer" – Green Jellÿ
- "Death 2" – Flatbush Zombies
- "Diddy Doo Wop (I Hear The Voices)" – Hall & Oates
- "Ditty" – Barkmarket
- "I Hear Black" – Overkill
- "Hello From the Gutter" – Overkill
- "Hot Damn" – Ivy Levan
- "Insane in the Brain" – Cypress Hill
- "Jumping at Shadows" – Benediction
- "Looking Down the Barrel of a Gun" – Beastie Boys
- "Mr. 44" – Electric Hellfire Club
- "Reign In Blood" – Necro
- "(Sam), Son of Man" – Marilyn Manson and The Spooky Kids
- "Stay Wide Awake" – Eminem
- "Son of A Gun (David Berkowitz)" – Church of Misery
- "Son of Sam" - Chain Gang
- "Son of Sam" – Dead Boys
- "Son of Sam" – Elliott Smith
- "Son of Sam" – Macabre
- "Son of Sam" – Shinedown
- "Son of Sam" – Violent Soho
- "Summer Of Sam" – Lana Del Rey
- "Unseen Darkness" – Sinister

=== Paul Bernardo ===
- "Choking Games" − Nicole Dollanganger

=== Kenneth Bianchi & Angelo Buono ===
- "Hillside Strangler" – The Destructors
- "The Hillside Stranglers" – Macabre
- "I Wanna Make You Scream" – Battalion of Saints
- "Notown Blues" – The Black Lips

=== Lawrence Bittaker and Roy Norris ===
- "The Murder Mack" – Macabre

=== Ian Brady & Myra Hindley ===
- "Archives of Pain" – Manic Street Preachers
- "Lambs to the Slaughter" – Church of Misery
- "Mother Earth" – Crass
- "No One Is Innocent" – The Sex Pistols
- "Suffer Little Children" – The Smiths
- "Very Friendly" – Throbbing Gristle

=== Jerry Brudos ===
- "Fatal Foot Fetish" – Macabre
- "Truest Shade of Crimson – Through the Eyes of the Dead

=== Ted Bundy ===
- "Anne" – Bloodbath
- "Black Friday" – Lil' Kim
- "Blackest Eyes" – Porcupine Tree
- "Blow" – Tyler, the Creator
- "Bundy" – Animal Alpha
- "Bundy's DNA" – Acid Drinkers
- "Crack" – Slowthai
- "Death 2" – Flatbush Zombies
- "The Drifter" – Green on Red
- "epaR" – Earl Sweatshirt
- "I, Motherfucker (Ted Bundy)" – Church of Misery
- "Just another psycho" - Mötley Crüe
- "Lotta True Crime"- Penelope Scott
- "Meticulous Invagination" – Aborted
- "Mr. Gore" – Blitzkid
- "Murder Dividead" – Edge Of Sanity
- "Reign In Blood" - Necro
- "Serial Killer" – Vio-lence
- "Stay Wide Awake" – Eminem
- "Stripped, Raped and Strangled" – Cannibal Corpse
- "Ted Bundy" – Theory of a Deadman
- "The Ted Bundy Song" – Macabre
- "Ted Bundy's Thanksgiving Dinner" – A Lot Like Birds
- "Ted, Just Admit It…" – Jane's Addiction
- "Till Death" – Lord Infamous
- "Torch Song Trilogy" - Handsome Boy Modeling School
- "Video Crimes" - Tin Machine
- "Warrior" - Swollen Members
- "We Want Cunt" – Jeffree Star
- "What Turns You on?" – The Cassandra Complex
- "The Wheels on the Bug" – Macabre

== C–F ==
=== Richard Chase ===
- "Blood Sucking Freaks (Richard Chase)" – Church of Misery
- "House Sparrow" – Xiu Xiu
- "Refuse 2 Lose" - Brotha Lynch Hung

=== Andrei Chikatilo ===
- "Andrei Chikatilo" – SKYND
- "How Are You, Kid?" – Macabre
- "Psychopathy Red" – Slayer
- "Red Ripper Blues (Andrei Chikatilo)" – Church of Misery
- "Ripper von Rostow" – Eisregen
- "Rostov Ripper" – Impious
- "The Butcher of Rostov" – Blood Tsunami

=== Leonarda Cianciulli ===
- "Confessions of an Embittered Soul (Leonarda Cianciulli)" by Church of Misery
- "Teacakes" – Macabre

=== Adolfo Constanzo ===
- "El Padrino (Adolfo Constanzo)" – Church of Misery
- "Sacrifical Shack" – Pain Teens

=== Dean Corll ===
- "Candyman" – Monte Cazazza
- "Candyman (Dean Corll)" – Church of Misery

=== Jeffrey Dahmer ===
- "213" – Slayer
- "Arcarsenal" – At The Drive-In
- "Bagpipes from Baghdad" – Eminem
- "Bandit" – Juice WRLD ft. NBA YoungBoy
- "Benz or Beamer" – Outkast
- "Big Boy’s Neighborhood Freestyle" - Kendrick Lamar
- "Black Friday"- Lil Kim
- "Body Parts" – Three 6 Mafia
- "Brainless" – Eminem
- "Break the Law"- Mac Miller
- "Cannibal" – Kesha
- "Celebrity Cannibalism" – Creaming Jesus
- "Choklit Factory" – Marilyn Manson
- "Control" – The Black Dahlia Murder
- "Da Graveyard" – Big L
- Dahmer – Macabre
- "Dahmer and the Limbs" – Nicole Dollanganger
- "Dahmer Does Hollywood" - Amigo the Devil
- "Dahmer is Dead" – Violent Femmes
- "Danger Zone" – Big L
- "Dark Horse" – Katy Perry ft. Juicy J
- "Death 2" – Meechy Darko
- "Designer Sadness" – Zheani
- "Dirty Frank" – Pearl Jam
- "Electric City" – Black Eyed Peas
- "Freak Like Me" – Brooke Candy ft. TOOPOOR
- "Freeze Dried Man" – Macabre
- "God Bless" – Combichrist
- "I'm On It" – J. Cole
- "Jeffrey" – Juice WRLD
- "Jeffrey Dahmer" – Soulfly
- "Keep it Underground" – Lords of the Underground
- "KKKill the Fetus" - Esham
- "Killer" - Phoebe Bridgers
- "Lift Me Up" - Vince Staples
- "Lil' Drummer Boy’ "- Lil Kim
- "Marlon JD" – Manic Street Preachers
- "Moonshine" - Swollen Members
- "Must Be The Ganja" - Eminem
- "Murder Avenue" - Geto Boys
- "Nature of the threat" - Ras Kass
- "Natural Born Killaz" - Dr. Dre ft. Ice Cube
- "Now I'm High, Really High" − Three 6 Mafia
- "Orange Juice" - EarlWolf
- "Particle Accelerator" - Tad
- "Pretty Boy Swag" - Tyga
- "Psycopath Killer" - Eminem ft Slaughterhouse & Yelawolf
- "Rage All Over" - Wargasm
- "Rap, Soda y Bohemia" – Molotov
- "Reign In Blood" - Necro
- "Room 213" – Church of Misery
- "Room 213" – Dead Moon
- "Room 213" - G.G.F.H.
- "Said the Spider to the Fly" - the pAper chAse
- "Sandwitches" - Tyler the Creator
- "Siccmade" - Brotha Lynch Hung
- "Sinthasomphone" – Venetian Snares
- "Spooky Mormon Hell Dream" - Andrew Rannells
- "Still Born/Still Life" – Christian Death
- "Straight Boys" - Jeffree Star
- "The Ballad Of Jeffrey Dahmer" – Pinkard & Bowden
- "The Joker's Wild" – Insane Clown Posse
- "Things Get Worse" - Eminem Ft. B.o.B
- "Tom Dahmer Mixtape Freestyle" – Necro
- "Transformer" – Future ft. Nicki Minaj
- "Trigger Inside" - Therapy?
- "Usual Suspects" – Hollywood Undead
- "You're Gonna Love This"- 3OH!3
- "What's That Smell?" – Macabre
- "What Will Happen Will Happen"- Lemon Demon

=== Albert DeSalvo ===
- "The Boston Strangler" – Macabre
- "Boston Strangler (Albert DeSalvo)" – Church of Misery
- "Dedicated to Albert De Salvo" – Whitehouse
- "Dirty Water" – The Standells
- "Little Engine" – Eminem
- "Midnight Rambler" – The Rolling Stones

=== Dnepropetrovsk maniacs ===
- "Dealers of Fame" - Oh, Sleeper

=== Mark Essex ===
- "Soul Discharge (Mark Essex)" – Church of Misery

=== Albert Fish ===
- "27 Needles" – John 5
- "Albert Fish/Liverwurst" – Green Jellÿ
- "Albert Was Worse Than Any Fish In The Sea" – Macabre
- "Better Ways To Fry A Fish" - Amigo the Devil
- "Document: Grace Budd" – The Number Twelve Looks Like You
- "Fish" - Tyler, the Creator
- "Fishtales" – Macabre
- "The Gray Man (Albert Fish)" – Church of Misery
- "Human Consumption" - Necro
- "Instruments of Hell" – Exhumed
- "Letter to Mother" - Divine Heresy
- "Mr. Albert Fish (Was Children Your Favourite Dish?)" – Macabre
- "Mr Fish" – Sparzanza
- "Slaughter House" – Macabre
- "Three Bedrooms in a Good Neighborhood" − Death Grips
- "The Werewolf of Westeria" – John 5

=== Lavinia Fisher ===
- "Pretty Lavinia" – American Murder Song

=== Lonnie David Franklin Jr. ===
- "Twistin'" – Lil Ugly Mane (featuring Denzel Curry)

== G–J ==
=== John Wayne Gacy ===
- "33 Something" – Bathory
- "Clownin' Around" - Deer Tick
- "Finger Paintings of The Insane" - Acid Bath
- "Gacy's Lot" – Macabre
- "Gacy's Place" - The Mentally Ill
- "John Wayne Gacy" – SKYND
- "John Wayne Gacy, Jr." – Sufjan Stevens
- "Master of Brutality (John Wayne Gacy)" – Church of Misery
- "Melmac" - The Cribs
- "Panty Shot" – Mindless Self Indulgence
- "Pogo The Clown" – Dog Fashion Disco
- "Pogo The Clown" – Hubert Kah
- "Reign In Blood" - Necro
- "Stinky" – Macabre
- "Suffer Age" – Fear Factory
- "Three for Flinching (Revenge of the Porno Clowns)" – The Dillinger Escape Plan
- "Unaccommodating" – Eminem
- "Under the Floor" – Hail the Sun

=== Harvey Murray Glatman ===
- "Harvey Glatman (Your Soul Will Forever Rot)" – Macabre

=== Carl Großmann ===
- "The Sweet Tender Meat Vendor" - Macabre

=== Belle Gunness ===
- "Bella The Butcher" – Macabre
- "Belle Gunness" – Cassius
- "Black Widow of La Porte" – John 5

=== Fritz Haarmann ===
- "Fritz Haarman der Metzger" – Macabre
- "Fritz Haarman the Butcher" – Macabre
- "Most Evil (Fritz Harmann)" – Church of Misery
- "Warte Warte" – Macabre

=== John George Haigh ===
- "Acid Bath Vampire" – Macabre
- "Make Them Die Slowly (John George Haigh)" – Church of Misery

=== Robert Hansen ===
- "Butcher Baker (Robert Hansen)" – Church of Misery
- "Robert Hansen" – SKYND

=== Karla Homolka ===
- "Choking Games" − Nicole Dollanganger

=== Jack the Ripper ===
- "Blood Red Sandman" – Lordi
- "Catch Me If You Can" - Leathermouth
- "The Death of Jack the Ripper" – The Legendary Pink Dots
- "Down on Whores" – Benediction
- "Fall" - Eminem
- "In the Mind of a Lunatic" – Sigh
- "Jack" – Iced Earth
- "Jack the Knife" – The Electric Hellfire Club
- "Jack the Ripper" – Buckethead
- "Jack the Ripper" - Hobbs' Angel of Death
- "Jack the Ripper" – LL Cool J
- "Jack The Ripper" – Macabre
- "Jack the Ripper" – Morrissey
- "Jack the Ripper" – Motörhead
- "Jack the Ripper" – Nationalteatern
- "Jack the Ripper" – Nick Cave and The Bad Seeds
- "Jack the Ripper" – Rob Kelly
- "Jack the Ripper" – Screaming Lord Sutch
- "Jack The Ripper" – The Horrors
- "Jack the Ripper" – The Fuzztones
- "Jack the Ripper in Heaven" – Club Moral
- "Jack the Ripper vs. Hannibal Lecter" - Epic Rap Battles of History
- "Killer on the Loose" - Thin Lizzy
- "Life Is a Rock (But the Radio Rolled Me)" – Reunion
- "London In Terror" - Motionless In White
- "Maxwell Murder" – Rancid
- "Music Box" - Eminem
- "Must be the Ganja" - Eminem
- "Reconstruction of the Female Anatomy" - Through the Eyes of the Dead
- "Respite on the Spitalfields" - Ghost
- "The Ripper" – Judas Priest
- "Saucy Jack" – Spinal Tap
- "She Knows" – Ne-Yo Feat. Juicy J
- The Somatic Defilement – Whitechapel
- "Tombstone Blues" − Bob Dylan
- "Unsolved Mysteries" – Animal Collective

== K–M ==
=== Theodore Kaczynski ===
- "Body Parts" – Three 6 Mafia
- "Exploding Octopus" – Ill Bill
- "FC: The Freedom Club" – Sleepytime Gorilla Museum
- "I Wanna Be a Unabomber" – Donnas
- "Killer Kaczynski" – Mando Diao
- "Militia Song" – Camper Van Beethoven
- "Unabomber" – J. Cole
- "The Unabomber" – Macabre
- "Unabomber" – M.I.R.V.
- "Unabomber" – The Acacia Strain
- "Unabomber" – Underground Resistance
- "What Will Happen Will Happen" - Lemon Demon

=== Edmund Kemper ===
- "Abomination Unseen" – Devourment
- "Edmund Kemper" – SKYND
- "Edmund Kemper Had a Terrible Temper" – Macabre
- "Edmund Temper" – Amigo the Devil
- "Forever" – The Berzerker
- "Fortress/Outer Space/Forever" – System of a Down
- "Killifornia (Ed Kemper)" – Church of Misery
- "Murder" – Seabound
- "Severed Head" – Suicide Commando
- "Temper Temper Mr. Kemper" – The Celibate Rifles
- "Urge to Kill" – Throbbing Gristle

=== Béla Kiss ===
- "Bela Kiss" – Gazpacho
- "Bella Kiss" – John 5
- "The Kiss of Death" - Macabre

=== Randy Kraft ===
- "Freeway Madness Boogie (Randy Kraft)" – Church of Misery

=== Joachim Kroll ===
- "Evil Ole Soul" – Macabre

=== Richard Kuklinski ===
- "The Iceman" – Macabre
- "Lyrical Hitman (Richard Kuklinski)" – Royce Da 5'9" and Marvwon

=== Peter Kürten ===
- Dedicated to Peter Kurten – Whitehouse
- "Dusseldorf Monster" - Church of Misery
- "In Germany Before the War" – Randy Newman
- "Vampire of Düsseldorf" – Macabre

=== Leonard Lake & Charles Ng ===
- "The Ballad of Leonard and Charles" – Exodus
- "The Lake Of Fire" – Macabre
- "Leonard's Lake" - Lil Ugly Mane
- "Macerate and Petrify" – Venetian Snares

=== Henry Lee Lucas & Ottis Toole ===
- "Henry: Portrait of a Serial Killer" - Fantômas
- "Let's Be Bad, Henry" - the pAper chAse
- "Lucas Toole" - Downthesun
- "Murder Company" – Church of Misery
- "Serial Killer" – Macabre
- "They Like Me, They Love Me" – Jason Hill
- "While You Sleep, I Destroy Your World"- Nailbomb

=== Herman Mudgett (a.k.a. H. H. Holmes) ===
- "Dr. Holmes (He Stripped Their Bones)" – Macabre
- "From the Cradle to the Grave" - Havok
- "Infecting them with Falsehood" – Deeds of Flesh
- "Murder Castle Blues (H.H. Holmes)" – Church of Misery
- "Them Dry Bones" - Macabre
- "The Torture Doctor" - Alkaline Trio

=== Herbert Mullin ===
- "Megalomania (Herbert Mullin)" – Church of Misery

== N–R ==
=== Dennis Nilsen ===
- "Cranley Gardens" (Denis Nilsen) – Church of Misery
- "Killing for Company" – Swans
- "Turnabout" — Moth Wranglers
- "When Lovers Die" – Children on Stun
- "You're Dying To Be With Me" – Macabre

=== Carl Panzram ===
- "The Nobodies" - Marilyn Manson
- "Reminiscences of a Minnesota State Training School Alumni, Class of 1905" – Flare Acoustic Arts League

=== Christopher Peterson ===
- "Shotgun Peterson" – Macabre

=== Alexander Pichushkin ===
- "Sewers" – Torture Killer

=== Robert Pickton ===
- "Fed To The Pigs" – Devourment
- "Hooker Fortified Pork Products" – The Accüsed
- "Pigfarm" – Mad Sin

=== Mikhail Popkov ===
- "Mikhail Popkov" – SKYND

=== Dorothea Puente ===
- "Dorthea's Dead Folks Home" – Macabre

=== Dennis Rader ===
- "Bind, Torture and Kill" – Suicide Commando
- "Bind Torture Kill" – Suffocation
- "B.T.K." - Church of Misery
- "BTK" - Exodus
- "Lotta True Crime" - Penelope Scott
- "Raider II" - Steven Wilson

=== Gilles de Rais ===
- "Barbazul versus el amor letal" - Patricio Rey y sus Redonditos de Ricota
- "The Black Knight" – Macabre
- Godspeed on the Devil's Thunder - Cradle of Filth
- "Into the Crypts of Rays" – Celtic Frost
- "Tritt Ein" – Saltatio Mortis
- "The Window" - The Black Dahlia Murder

=== Richard Ramirez ===
- "Acosador Nocturno" - Soulfly
- "City of Angels" - Testament
- "Disappearing Syndrome" – Hail the Sun
- "Godzilla" - Eminem
- "Going Going Gone" – Exodus
- "Kamikaze" - Eminem
- "Killer" – King Diamond
- "Knight Stalker" - Shadow Project
- "Night Crawler" - Judas Priest
- "Night Crawling" - Miley Cyrus featuring Billy Idol
- "The Night Stalker" – Bewitched
- "Night Stalker" – Macabre
- "Night Stalker" – Super Heroines
- "Noche Acosador" – John 5
- "Nocturnal Predator" - Legion of the Damned
- "Ramirez" - The Acacia Strain
- "The Reflecting God" - Marilyn Manson
- "Richard Ramirez" - SKYND
- "Richard Ramirez Died Today Of Natural Causes" - Sun Kil Moon
- "Smooth Criminal" - Michael Jackson
- "Snake Eyes and Sissies" - Marilyn Manson
- "Where Evil Dwells (Richard Ramirez)" – Church of Misery
- "Your Window Is Open" – Macabre

=== Gary Ridgway ===
- "Come On Down" - Green River
- "Deep Red Bells" – Neko Case
- "Green River" – Church of Misery
- "The Green River Murderer (He's Still Out There)" – Macabre
- "I Wanna Know What Love Is" - Julie Ruin
- "Sane vs. Normal" - Mnemic
- "You Can't Slip" - Sir Mix A Lot

=== Danny Rolling ===
- "Danny Rolling" – The Murder Junkies

== S–Z ==
=== Tamara Samsonova ===
- "Tamara Samsonova" – SKYND

=== Shankill Butchers ===
- "Shankill Butchers" – The Decemberists
- "Shankill Butchers" – Sarah Jarosz

=== Harold Shipman ===
- "Doctor Death ((Harold Shipman))" - Church of Misery
- "Lips of Ashes" – Porcupine Tree
- "What About Us?" - The Fall

=== Peter Stumpp ===
- "1589" - Powerwolf
- "Werewolf of Bedburg" – Macabre

=== Peter Sutcliffe ===
- "Archives of Pain" - Manic Street Preachers
- "The Chapeltown Rag" - Slipknot
- "Leeds Ripper" – Throbbing Gristle
- "Leeds United" – Luke Haines
- "Night Shift" – Siouxsie and the Banshees
- "The Ripper" – Pallas
- "Ripper" - The Exploited
- "Ripping Into Pieces (Peter Sutcliffe)" – Church of Misery

=== Jack Unterweger ===
- "Disappearing Syndrome" – Hail the Sun

=== Joseph Vacher ===
- "The Ripper Tramp from France" - Macabre

=== Dorángel Vargas ===
- "El Comegente" - Soulfly

=== Fred West/Rose West ===
- "25 Cromwell St." - Apoptygma Berzerk
- "Evil" – Interpol
- "Fred and Rose" - Kunt and the Gang
- "Strip the Soul" - Porcupine Tree

=== Wayne Williams ===
- "Aquemini" - Outkast
- "Atlanta, GA" - Shawty Lo feat. Gucci Mane, The-Dream, and Ludacris
- "the ends" - Travis Scott feat. André 3000
- "Growing Pains" - Ludacris feat. Fate Wilson and Keon Bryce
- "Thought Process" - Goodie Mob feat. André 3000

=== Aileen Wuornos ===
- "Aileen" – Willam
- "Aileen Wuornos" – SKYND
- "Disease of Men" – Kristin Hayter
- "Filth Bitch Boogie (Aileen Wuornos)" – Church of Misery
- "For I Am the Light (And Mine Is the Only Way Now)" - Kristin Hayter
- "Holy Is the Name (Of My Ruthless Axe)" − Kristin Hayter
- "If the Poison Won't Take You My Dogs Will" – Kristin Hayter
- "Poor Aileen" – Superheaven
- "Sixth Of June" – It Dies Today

=== Graham Frederick Young ===
- "Poison" – Macabre
- "Taste the Pain (Graham Young)" – Church Of Misery

=== Zodiac Killer ===
- "Dear Editor" – Kamelot
- "Death 2" – Flatbush Zombies
- "Gemini" – Slayer
- "Nostalgia in Lemonade" − Avey Tare
- "Sick of Living (Zodiac)" – Church of Misery
- "Venus in Furs" – Electric Wizard
- "The Zodiac" – Kamelot
- "Zodiac" – Macabre
- "Zodiac" – Melvins
- "Zodiac" - Six Feet Under
- "Zodiac (He Is Still Out There.....)" – Christian Death
- "Zodiac Shit" – Flying Lotus

== See also ==
- Lists of serial killers
- Murder ballad

== Further listening (recorded compilations) ==
- Bloody Ballads: Classic British and American Murder Ballads, Sung by Paul Clayton, Ed. by Kenneth S. Goldstein, Riverside Records, New York, 1956 (includes cover notes)
- Blood Booze 'n Bones, Sung by Ed McCurdy, banjo accompaniment by Erik Darling, Elektra Records, 1956 (includes 12 page booklet)
- Murder Ballads, by Nick Cave and the Bad Seeds, Mute Records, 1996
- Murder Metal, Macabre, 2003 (This band appears to have become known for a death metal variation of the murder ballad)
