= Michael Bethke =

American murderer

- Occupation: Former clerk
- Known for: Killing, decapitating co-worker

Details
- Victims: Joseph Lesinski, aged 49
- Locations: White Hen Pantry, Burnham, Illinois, U.S.
- Killed: 1
- Weapons: Kitchen knife

Michael Bethke is an American citizen from Calumet City, Illinois, who killed and decapitated Joseph Lesinski, his 49-year-old co-worker at the Burnham, Illinois, White Hen Pantry grocery store, on June 6, 1991.

Described as having "chronic paranoid schizophrenia", Bethke was found not guilty by reason of insanity and sentenced to up to 49 years in a state mental institution.

== Press coverage ==
A story regarding Bethke can be found in the May 21, 1993 issue of the Chicago Tribune at page 3. The story states that Michael Bethke of Calumet City, Illinois was found not guilty by reason of insanity in the slaying of 49 year-old Joseph Lesinski and that a hearing regarding his mental condition and future prognosis would be held on June 3, 1993. The story also states that the slaying occurred on June 6, 1991, while both Bethke and his victim Lesinki were working at the Burnham White Hen Pantry. According to the story, "Bethke admitted to decapitating Lesinski with a knife when the victim bent over to get a pack of cigarettes." The July 9, 1993 issue of the Tribune reports that Bethke was ordered to spend up to 49 years in a state mental institution. The June 7, 1991, issue of the Chicago Tribune also has a detailed article on page 1.

Bethke was described by Assistant Public Defender Paul Brownlee as having "chronic paranoid schizophrenia". He used a 14-inch kitchen knife to behead Lesinski. A detailed report of the crime scene can be found in the June 8, 1991, issue of the Sun-Times, at page 12, which noted that the victim apparently had the word "repent" scrawled on his forehead.

== In popular culture ==
His story was described in the song "White Hen Decapitator" on the Macabre album Sinister Slaughter in 1993.
