= Sinister Slaughter =

Studio album by Macabre
- Released: April 13, 1993
- Recorded: September – October 1992
- Studio: Universal Studios, Chicago, Illinois
- Genre: Death metal; thrash metal
- Length: 42:18
- Label: Nuclear Blast
- Producer: Macabre, Jeff Cline

Macabre chronology
Gloom (1989)	Sinister Slaughter (1993)	Behind the Wall of Sleep (1994)

Professional ratings
Review scores
Source	Rating
AllMusic	3/5 stars

Sinister Slaughter is the second full-length album by American death metal band Macabre and was released in 1993 by Nuclear Blast Records. The cover artwork is a parody on the Beatles album Sgt. Pepper's Lonely Hearts Club Band featuring the band members, serial killers and mass murderers. The album was re-released in 2000 in a digipak that included the songs off the Behind the Wall of Sleep EP as bonus tracks.

The album's sound has been described as "very unique, offbeat murder metal." The album explores lyrical themes pertaining to serial killers.

== Track listing ==
1. "Nightstalker" – 2:04 – Richard Ramirez
2. "The Ted Bundy Song" – 1:18 – Ted Bundy
3. "Sniper in the Sky" – 1:51 – Charles Whitman
4. "Montreal Massacre" – 1:25 – Marc Lépine
5. "Zodiac" – 3:46 – Zodiac Killer
6. "James Pough, What the Hell Did You Do?!" – 2:09 – James Edward Pough
7. "The Boston Strangler" – 1:10 – Albert DeSalvo
8. "Mary Bell" – 0:43 – Mary Bell
9. "Mary Bell Reprise" – 0:45 – Mary Bell
10. "Killing Spree (Postal Killer)" – 1:21 – Patrick Sherrill
11. "Is It Soup Yet?" – 1:18 – Daniel Rakowitz
12. "White Hen Decapitator" – 2:30 – Michael Bethke
13. "Howard Unrah (What Have You Done Now?!)" – 2:28 – Howard Unrah
14. "Gacy's Lot" – 2:20 – John Wayne Gacy
15. "There Was a Young Man Who Blew up a Plane" – 2:10 – Jack Gilbert Graham
16. "Vampire of Dusseldorf" – 2:43 – Peter Kürten
17. "Shotgun Peterson" – 2:48 – Christopher Peterson
18. "What's that Smell?" – 3:02 – Jeffrey Dahmer
19. "Edmund Kemper Had a Horrible Temper" – 2:34 – Edmund Kemper
20. "What the Heck Richard Speck (Eight Nurses You Wrecked)" – 2:05 – Richard Speck
21. "Albert Was Worse than Any Fish in the Sea" – 1:31 – Albert Fish

== Credits ==
- Corporate Death – guitars and lead vocals
- Nefarious – bass guitar and vocals. Acoustic guitar on "Mary Bell." Lead vocals on "Killing Spree (Postal Killer)." and "Airplane bass" on "There Was A Young Man Who Blew Up A Plane"
- Dennis the Menace – Drums
- Jeff Cline – Synclavier programming and sound effects. Piano intro on "Vampire Of Dussledorf." Soundtrack for Murder Intro on "Nightstalker."
- Scary Gary – lead vocals on "White Hen Decapitator." Laugh and voice on "Nightstalker" intro.
- Tony Iovino – guitar solo on "Shotgun Peterson." Acoustic insanity on "James Pough, What the Hell Did You Do?!"

=== Technical ===
- Produced by Jeff (The Max Mixer) Cline and Macabre
- Executive producer – Markus Staiger
- Music and lyrics by Corporate Death and Nefarious except "Zodiac" lyrics "ciphered" by The Zodiac Killer
- Drum parts – Dennis the Menace
- All songs arranged by Macabre, except "Mary Bell" arranged ("derranged" according to the album notes) by Nefarious and Jeff Cline
- Photos – Curt Ritchie
- Album cover – Dan Schneider
- Concept – John Martin and Nefarious
- Revised layout – A. J. Loeb
