= 1966 Dayton race riot =

Civil disorder in Ohio

- Dayton uprising Part of the ghetto riots
- Date: September 1, 1966
- Location: Dayton, Ohio, United States

Parties
Ohio National Guard	rioters

Casualties
- Deaths: 1
- Injuries: 30
- Arrested: Over 100 (Note: On the low end, a 2013 book by academic Ravi K. Perry states that there were "over one hundred arrests". The Encyclopedia of American Race Riots (2007) states that 130 arrests had been made, While both a 2016 article in the Dayton Daily News and a 2017 article on BlackPast.org state that over 500 arrests were made.)

A race riot occurred in Dayton, Ohio, United States, on September 1 and lasted about 24 hours, ending after the Ohio National Guard had been mobilized. It was the largest race riot in Dayton's history and one of several to occur during the 1960s.

Through the 20th century, Dayton experienced significant racial tensions due to the white population's discrimination of African Americans in the city. By the mid-1960s, it was one of the most segregated cities in the United States, with most of its African American population living in the impoverished west side of the city, described by the Dayton Daily News as "a ghetto with neglected schools and discriminatory city services". By 1966, the area had experienced several race-related riots. That year, in the early morning of September 1, Lester Mitchell, an African American man, was killed in a drive-by shooting, with eyewitnesses saying that the assailant had been white. Following this, largescale rioting had begun by 10 a.m., primarily affecting west Dayton before moving into the city's downtown. By 10:30 a.m., the mayor of Dayton arrived at the scene of the rioting and stated that he had requested the governor of Ohio to mobilize the National Guard to restore order. Additionally, a curfew was enacted, some businesses were closed, and the several hundred police attempted to blockade west Dayton. The National Guard arrived at around 3 p.m., but by that time much of the rioting had ended.

In the aftermath of the rioting, one person had died, 30 had been injured, and over 100 had been arrested. The riot caused about $250,000 in property damage, primarily to African American-owned businesses in west Dayton. Following the riot, the area began to decline economically, with many businesses either relocating or remaining closed. The city's racial issues were exacerbated in the following years with additional race riots (including two in 1967 and the King assassination riots in 1968) and increased white flight to the surrounding area. Speaking about the issue in 2016, former Dayton mayor Rhine McLin stated that west Dayton had been "punished" by city officials because of the riot and had peaked economically in the years immediately preceding the riot. As of 2016, Dayton remains among the most segregated major metropolitan areas in the United States.

== Background ==
The 1960s in the United States saw several large race riots in major cities. This wave of riots began in New York City with the Harlem riot of 1964 and were followed the next year by the Watts riots in Los Angeles, which were regarded as one of the most destructive riots to occur in the country in the 1900s. These riots were often due to underlying social issues facing African American communities in these large cities and, according to academic Jonathon A. Cooper, were often triggered by "a confrontation between blacks and the police over a relatively trivial matter".

In the city of Dayton, Ohio, racial tensions had grown through the mid-1900s, with many African Americans segregated from the white population of the city. In 1966, the city was one of the most segregated in the United States, with about 60,000 African Americans (roughly 96 percent of Dayton's African American population) living in west Dayton due to housing segregation. The area was an impoverished part of the city, with a 2016 article in the Dayton Daily News describing it as "what many perceived as a ghetto with neglected schools and discriminatory city services". A 1966 article in the Dayton Daily News identified four main issues that African American community leaders had with regards to west Dayton, which included worse educational opportunities than white schools offered, joblessness, lack of access to home loans due to discrimination, and a lack of concern for the neighborhood residents from city leaders. While there had been some integration in the previous years, such as the election of Dayton's first African American board of education member and city commissioner in 1952 and 1961, respectively, some in the west side felt that the progress was occurring too slowly. In 1963, some white residents of the Madison Township suburb rioted after a black family moved into their neighborhood, which was suppressed by riot police.

At about 3 a.m. EDT on the morning of September 1, 1966, Lester Mitchell, a 39-year-old African American man, was shot while sweeping the sidewalk in front of his bar on West Fifth Street, (Note: While several sources state that he was sweeping the sidewalk in front of his bar, one article from the Dayton Daily News states that he was sweeping the sidewalk in front of his apartment.) located in a busy business district in west Dayton. Mitchell was taken to a hospital, where he died from his injuries. Sources varied to some extent on the killing, with one eyewitness stating that it was a white man driving a red car in a drive-by shooting, though they were unsure if it was a single man or a group of men involved. (Note: In the Encyclopedia of American Race Riots (2007), academic Claudia Matherly Stolz stated that the drive-by shooting was conducted by three white men in a pickup truck. Additionally, in a 2013 book, academic Ravi K. Perry stated that Mitchell had been killed "by white assailants".)

== Riot ==
By 10 a.m., the killing of Mitchell had precipitated one of the earliest race riots in Dayton's history, (Note: While the entry on the riot in the Encyclopedia of American Race Riots (2007) states that it was "the first race riot in the history of Dayton, Ohio", a 2016 article in the Dayton Daily News states that there had been an earlier race riot in 1955 over the murder of Emmett Till.) with looting and rioting primarily occurring in west Dayton. While Mitchell's murder had been the primary cause of the riot, other causes included underlying issues that had impacted Dayton's African American community, such as high unemployment, poor housing, and a lack of dialogue with city leaders. Additionally, the rioting had been inflamed by a police investigation wherein they stated that a drive-by shooting would have been impossible. During this time, rioters threw projectiles such as bottles and rocks at vehicles driven by or carrying white Americans, with a reporter from The Journal Herald reporting that the crowd was chanting, "Kill! Kill! Kill!". One white truck driver suffered a fractured jaw after a projectile came through the windshield of his vehicle. Over 100 protesters were involved, and while 225 police officers set up a blockade around west Dayton, they were given orders to not engage with the rioters. Soon, the rioting had spread into downtown Dayton, leading to more property damage in that area. During this time, some African American men sought to defuse the situation by attempting to negotiate concessions with Dayton's city manager and police chief, requesting that some of the protesters who had been arrested be released and that two white police officers who patrolled west Dayton be removed from that beat. While the city officials agreed to these changes, it did little to hamper the rioting. C. J. McLin, who was later elected as a member of the Ohio House of Representatives, was one of the people who negotiated with the city officials.

By 10:30 a.m., Dayton Mayor Dave Hall had arrived at the scene of the rioting. Police stationed there had armed themselves with shotguns borrowed from nearby pawn shops. Speaking to the crowd via a police car bullhorn, Hall notified them that he had requested the governor of Ohio to deploy members of the Ohio National Guard to subdue this "disturbance of the peace". Governor Jim Rhodes, who was at the Ohio State Fair when he received Hall's request, approved it and deployed 1,000 soldiers. At around 12:40 p.m., Hall ordered that bars and restaurants in west Dayton be closed. Additionally, liquor stores were closed, a curfew for everyone under the age of 15 was enacted, some city services were temporarily suspended, and trains were rerouted. By 3 p.m., the National Guard had arrived in Dayton, led by Adjutant General Erwin Hostetler and composed of men from the nearby municipalities of Blanchester, Covington, Eaton, Middletown, and Xenia. However, by the time of their arrival, much of the rioting had ended. Guardsmen patrolled the city in Jeeps armed with .50-caliber machine guns, while Hostetler made a tour of the city in an unmarked police car without any violent incidents, noting only signs of property damage. In total, rioting lasted for about 24 hours.

== Aftermath ==
In the immediate aftermath of the rioting, there were 30 injuries and one death. Sources vary on the exact number of arrests made during the rioting, but there were over 100 total. Public safety costs associated with the riot were approximately $20,000 (equivalent to $198,462 in 2022), while the cost of the property damage was about $250,000 ($2.48 million in 2022), which mostly affected African American-owned businesses. The riot garnered national attention because U.S. President Lyndon B. Johnson had been scheduled to speak at a Labor Day ceremony in Dayton the following weekend. The Dayton Daily News later described the riot as "one of the city's worst race riots" and "one of the worst riots in Dayton's history". In the years that followed, Dayton was home to several more race riots, including two in 1967 (one following a speech by civil rights activist H. Rap Brown and another following the police killing of an African American man) and one in 1968 as part of the nationwide King assassination riots. Of these, the 1966 riot was the largest. Nationwide, 1966 saw numerous race riots similar to the one in Dayton, with about 44 major American cities experiencing race riots, resulting in seven deaths and about 400 injuries. However, Dayton was one of only five cities, along with Cleveland, Chicago, Milwaukee, and San Francisco, to result in the National Guard being called. The following year saw even more riots than in 1966, leading to the U.S. federal government creating the Kerner Commission to study and report on the wave of riots across the country. While no one was ever convicted of Mitchell's murder, a former police officer for Dayton's police department stated in a 2016 article of the Dayton Daily News that he believed it may have been Neal Long, a racist serial killer who targeted African American men in Dayton.

Following the riot, many businesses in west Dayton either relocated out of the area or never reopened, and west Dayton continued to decline economically over the next several decades. Segregation remained a significant issue in Dayton. In 2002, the city's school district was the last in Ohio to be released from a federal desegregation order, though many of the schools are still highly segregated. As of 2016, according to a report from the Brookings Institution, Dayton was the 14th most segregated large metropolitan area in the United States. Additionally, the city saw marked white flight following the riot, resulting in an overall decline in the population and in increase in the African American population as a percentage of the population. Speaking about the changes to west Dayton following the rioting, politician Rhine McLin (daughter of C. J. McLin) said, "West Dayton today is worse off than west Dayton 50 years ago before the riots. Those areas were punished for rioting". Former NAACP President Jessie Gooding Jr. similarly stated that west Dayton had been economically more vibrant prior to the riot, but offered a different take on the reason for the decline, saying, "What led to their demise? Contrary to popular belief, it was not only the riots, but the highway system first, in my opinion. Before the riots, moves were being made by the city and the state to acquire land on the west side for the highway system. After the riots, when many of the businesses were closed and white flight began in earnest, the promised economic boom to the west side did not happen and small black businesses were affected". However, as of 2016, the area has seen some new economic investment in the form of new businesses and developments.

In 2016, the riot was the subject of a four-part story by the Dayton Daily News called "Lasting Scars", which analyzed both the causes of and the lasting legacy of the riot.

== See also ==
- List of ethnic riots
- List of incidents of civil unrest in the United States
- Mass racial violence in the United States

== Sources ==
- Perry, Ravi K. (2013). Black Mayors, White Majorities: The Balancing Act of Racial Politics. Lincoln, Nebraska: University of Nebraska Press. ISBN 978-0-8032-4946-2.
