= Morbid Curiosity =

Morbid Curiosity may refer to:

- Morbid curiosity, an interest in death, violence, or other harmful events
- Morbid Curiosity (magazine), an American non-fiction magazine
- Morbid Curiosity, a 2007 novel by Deborah LeBlanc
- Morbid Curiosity, a 2018 album by Thingy
- "Morbid Curiosity", the second part of the song "Mass Murder" by Macabre from the 1987 EP Grim Reality
- "Morbid Curiosity", a song by Heathen from the 1991 album Victims of Deception
