= Carnival of Killers =

Studio album by Macabre
- Released: November 13, 2020
- Genre: Death metal; thrash metal; grindcore
- Length: 40:51
- Label: Nuclear Blast

Macabre chronology
Grim Scary Tales (2011)	Carnival of Killers (2020)

Carnival of Killers is the sixth album by American extreme metal band Macabre. It was released through Nuclear Blast on November 13, 2020.

== Reception ==
Angela Davey in Kerrang! described Carnival of Killers as "for death metal fans looking for expert songwriting and precision, this record is best avoided. This is a tongue-in-cheek rendering of the genre from the band who supposedly helped to craft it. There’s silliness aplenty and a great riff or two, however, this is a novelty album that’s meant to be taken light heartedly. Listen with a sense of humour and you won’t be disappointed." Blabbermouth described the album as "no surprises to be found on Macabre's "Carnival of Killers", and the band's campy humor has always been the primary driver of their musical odes to horrific crimes. But even longtime fans may still lament that, given the nine-year wait, there's not a little bit more metallic meat to the record's bones."

== Track listing ==
1. "Intro (instrumental)" - 0:36
2. "Your Window Is Open" - 3:02 - Richard Ramirez
3. "Joe Ball Was His Name" - 3:32 Joe Ball
4. "Stinky" - 2:15 - John Wayne Gacy
5. "Abduction (instrumental)" - 0:27
6. "Tea Cakes" - 2:45 - Leonarda Cianciulli
7. "Them Dry Bones (Delta Rhythm Boys cover)" - 2:45 - H. H. Holmes
8. "Richard Speck Grew Big Breasts" - 2:36 - Richard Speck
9. "Slaughter House" - 2:33 - Albert Fish
10. "Breaking Point (instrumental)" - 0:52
11. "The Lake of Fire" - 3:57 - Leonard Lake
12. "Warte, Warte" - 3:00 - Fritz Haarmann
13. "Now It's Time to Pay" - 2:27 - Timothy McVeigh
14. "The Wheels on the Bug" - 2:23 - Ted Bundy
15. "Corpse Violator" - 3:16 - Ed Gein
16. "The Murder Mack" - 4:25 - Lawrence Bittaker and Roy Norris

== Credits ==
- Corporate Death - Guitars, Vocals
- Nefarious - Bass, Vocals
- Dennis The Menace - Drums
