= Behind the Wall of Sleep (EP) =

EP by Macabre
- Released: July 25, 1994
- Genre: Death metal; thrash metal
- Length: 11:56
- Label: Nuclear Blast

Macabre chronology
Sinister Slaughter (1993)	Behind the Wall of Sleep (1994)	Dahmer (2000)

Professional ratings
Review scores
Source	Rating
Allmusic	1.5/5 stars

Behind the Wall of Sleep is an EP by American extreme metal band Macabre released in 1994 on Nuclear Blast Records. It contains three new tracks and one cover of Black Sabbath's song "Behind the Wall of Sleep" from their 1970 debut album Black Sabbath.

This EP is included on the re-release of the Sinister Slaughter album; however the title is misspelled as Behind the Walls of Sleep.

The name comes from "Beyond the Wall of Sleep", a horror tale written by H. P. Lovecraft.

== Track listing ==
1. "Fishtales" – 1:48 - Albert Fish
2. "Behind the Wall of Sleep" – 3:52
3. "Slaughter Thy Poser" – 2:14
4. "Freeze Dried Man" – 3:59 - Jeffrey Dahmer

== Credits ==
- Corporate Death – guitars, vocals
- Nefarious – bass, vocals
- Dennis the Menace – drums
- Gouger (John Tolczyk) – engineer
