= Grim Reality =

Grim Reality may refer to:

- Grim Reality (EP), by Macabre, 1987
- Grim Reality (album), by Insane Poetry, 1992
