= Addison Grace =

American musician and TikTok personality (born 2001)

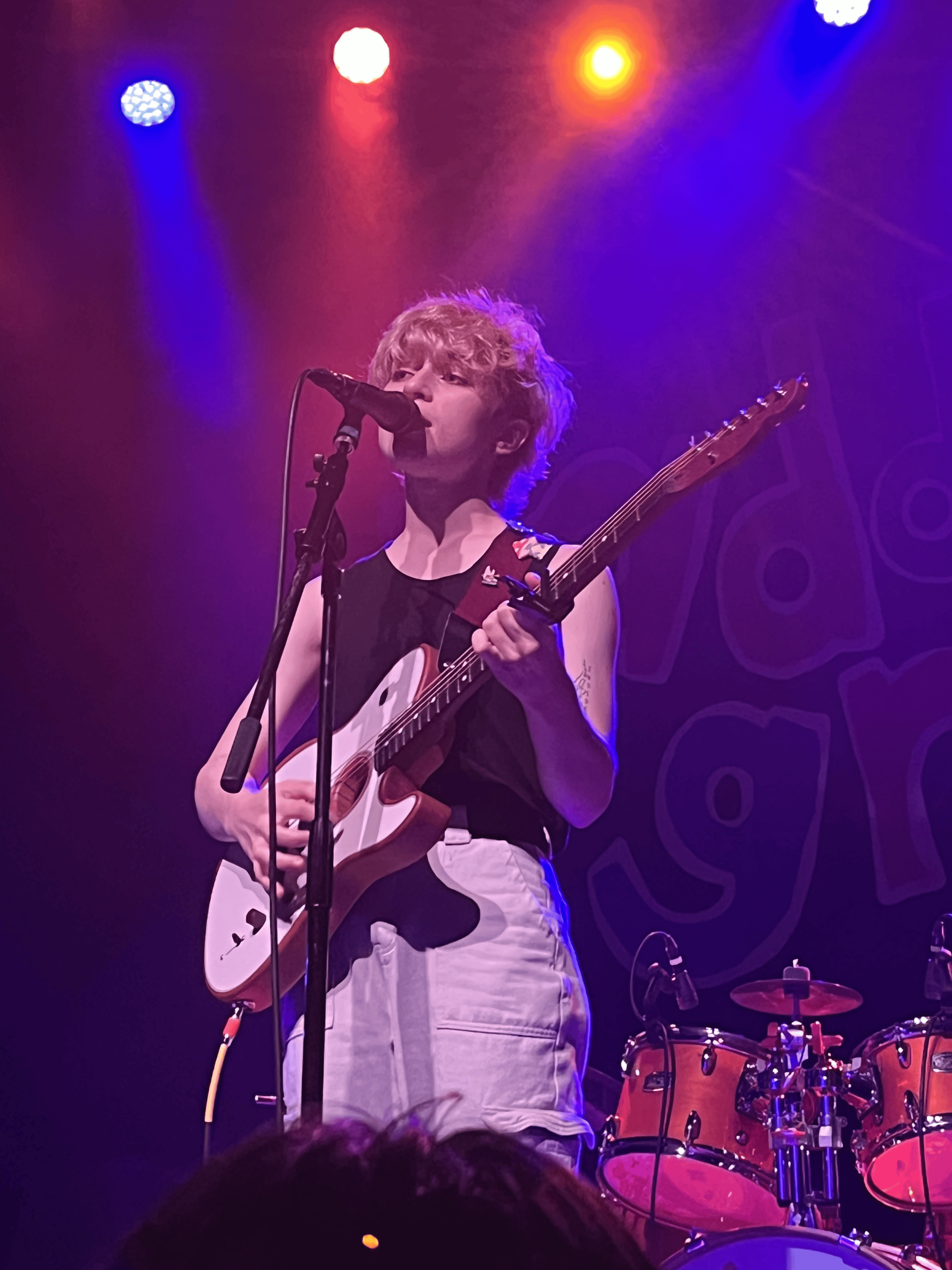

Background information
- Born: March 21, 2001 (age 25); California, United States
- Origin: Salt Lake City, Utah
- Genres: Indie pop; bedroom pop
- Occupations: Singer, songwriter, producer, TikToker
- Instruments: Vocals, ukulele, guitar
- Years active: 2017–present
- Labels: Level Music, Wally the Wall Shark
- Website: addisongrace.xyz

TikTok information
- Page: Addison Grace
- Followers: 3.7M (May 4, 2025)

Addison Grace (born March 21, 2001) is an American singer-songwriter and online personality. Having developed a following on social media sites like TikTok, Instagram, and YouTube, he (Note: Grace uses he/him and they/them pronouns. This article uses he/him for consistency.) has released two EPs, Immaturing and Things That Are Bad for Me (both 2022), and toured with artists including Cavetown, Tessa Violet, Penelope Scott, and Chloe Moriondo.

== Early life ==
Grace was born on March 21, 2001 in California, but grew up in Salt Lake City, Utah, where his family moved when he was a child. He was raised by a single mother who encouraged her children (Addison and two older siblings) in sports and performing arts, enrolling Grace in choir, acting, and dance lessons. Grace was drawn to singing at an early age, performing in various school and church choirs and auditioning for local musicals. He was also a visual artist as a child. When Grace was 13, his brother brought a ukulele home from France, and Grace, having seen YouTubers use the instrument, began using it to make his own music. Grace graduated high school but did not attend college, instead taking a retail job as a cashier and store manager and performing at coffee shops on the side until his music career took off.

== Career ==
Grace created a YouTube channel in 2017, posting ukulele bedroom covers as well as original songs. He also began posting music and other content to Instagram in 2018 and TikTok in 2019. After posting a Christmas cover in which he wore a Cavetown sweatshirt (having bought it at a concert in 2019), Grace gained the attention of Alternate Side management, who helped release his 2020 debut single "Sugar Rush" with Cavetown producing. Shortly afterward, Grace was signed to Warner Music Group's Level Music. A second single, "Overthink", was released on October 30, 2020. The following year, Grace released several more singles including "Honeysuckle", "Party Killer", and "Manic Pixie Dream Girl", as well as acoustic versions of his first two singles entitled "Why I Overthink" and "I've Got A Sugar Rush". He also opened for Chloe Moriondo on her fall "Blood Bunny" tour, alongside Wallice, Penelope Scott, and Alfie Templeman.

January 2022 saw the official single release of "I Wanna Be a Boy". The song, about Grace's discovery of his gender identity, had been a fan favorite since Grace had posted it as an acoustic demo to YouTube in December 2020; the demo reached over 500K views on YouTube, while the official release reached over 1 million streams on Spotify. The single's cover art is a scrapbook-style collage of photos of Grace throughout his life. Another single, "Makes Me Sick", was released on March 4; it was produced by Cameron Hale (Claud, Neon Trees, Khalid) and accompanied by a music video directed by Sydney Ostrander (Chloe Moriondo, Beach Bunny), and reached over 100,000 streams within two weeks of its release. In the spring, Grace joined Cavetown as an opening act on his US tour alongside Tessa Violet.

Grace's debut EP, Immaturing, was released on May 6, 2022, featuring "I Wanna Be a Boy" and "Makes Me Sick" alongside the singles "I Don't Wanna Fall in Love" and "Getting Used To". In July, Grace supported Penelope Scott on several dates in London during her UK tour, and in August, he embarked on his first headlining tour, "The Immaturing Tour", accompanied by Sydney Rose, Kate Stephenson, and Leanna Firestone.

In October, Grace released a new single, "Pretty Girl", produced by Andy Seltzer (Chelsea Cutler, Del Water Gap, Samia); he also announced an upcoming second EP entitled Things That Are Bad For Me. A second single, "If Nobody Likes U", premiered later in the month, and the EP was released on November 11. Also in November, Grace joined Ricky Montgomery on a West Coast tour.

In April 2023, Grace released the single "WW3", a protest song directed at United States Senate action surrounding the climate crisis, gun control, and LGBT rights. The song was produced by Roy Kerr, who co-wrote the song with Grace and Fatherson's Ross Leighton, and was mastered by Chris Gehringer. In July, Grace announced his debut album, Diving Lessons, to be released on September 29, 2023, via AWAL and co-produced by Cavetown, alongside the album's lead single "White Lie".

== Artistry and public image ==
Grace's music typically occupies the indie pop and bedroom pop genres, influenced by artists including Cavetown, Tessa Violet, Orla Gartland, Dodie, Taylor Swift, Phoebe Bridgers, Lizzy McAlpine, Mitski, and Rex Orange County. He has named Swift's "Teardrops on My Guitar" as the first song that emotionally affected him: "I had this broken-down Hannah Montana guitar that was not tuned correctly, and I was like, 'Oh, my God, I can feel her emotion.'" Discussing his evolution prior to the release of Immaturing, Grace said, "If you listen to [my first single] "Sugar Rush," it's this lo-fi ukulele song, and now I'm writing "I Don't Wanna Fall in Love," these hyper-pop electronic songs." The latter song has also been described as "rock-leaning", while "Makes Me Sick" incorporates a harp and acoustic guitar. "Pretty Girl", the lead single from Things That Are Bad For Me, introduced a darker and more melancholy sound than Grace's previous work.

Lyrically, both Grace and the media have compared his songwriting to diary entries. Several songs are informed by Grace's queer identity; "Sugar Rush" metaphorically describes a queer awakening and first crush, while "I Wanna Be a Boy" and "Pretty Girl" reflect Grace's evolving trans identity and its impact on relationships. Other songs have dealt with anxiety and self-sabotage ("Makes Me Sick"), societal ideas of romance ("I Don't Wanna Fall in Love"), coming of age ("Getting Used To", "Kill The Switch"), and self-acceptance ("If Nobody Likes U"). Grace told BroadwayWorld that the Immaturing EP was "my journey of growing up, discovering myself, and transitioning", whereas Things That Are Bad for Me was "the journey of not only learning to live with yourself but also learning to feel those difficult, gross emotions and be able to accept them."

=== Social media use ===
Grace is known for his use of social media, being active on platforms including YouTube, Instagram, Twitter, Twitch, and most prominently TikTok. As of July 2022, Grace had over 3.8 million TikTok followers, 500K on Instagram, and 200K on YouTube. His TikTok account features song and tour promos, content about being a trans artist, and short unrelated humorous videos. Grace's early online persona was described as "bubbly", marked by "expressiveness", "e-girl makeup and twee style", while a 2022 profile described his persona as "bold, funny, utterly idiosyncratic". Grace has expressed a preference for TikTok among his platforms, citing its ease of use and allowance for genuine expression.

== Personal life ==
Grace is a Lesbian and a non-binary trans man who uses he/they pronouns. Having identified as a bisexual cis woman at the beginning of his career, Grace discovered his identity while writing the song "I Wanna Be a Boy" and came out ahead of the song's official release.

Grace is autistic and has ADHD, and has often spoken about mental health online. Outside of music, Grace crochets as a hobby and is known among fans for making stuffed animals, particularly sharks and frogs; his business, Wally the Wall Shark, is named for his stuffed shark. He has a tattoo above his knee of a lyric from the Phoebe Bridgers song "Graceland Too", which he performed while touring with Cavetown. He owns an adopted cat named Killua.

During the George Floyd protests in 2020, Grace participated in Blackout Tuesday, encouraging followers to vote in upcoming elections and donate to a list of progressive and anti-racist organizations, including the Minnesota Freedom Fund, the Innocence Project, Reclaim the Block, and Black Lives Matter. In March 2022, following a series of legislation in Florida and Texas targeting LGBT youth such as the "Don't Say Gay" bill, Grace tweeted that he was "nauseatingly sick" of such legislation and to "keep speaking up against each one". Speaking to GoPride.com the following month, he said, "There are a lot of issues that I care about like global warming and the insane amount of attacks that are happening to transgender kids around the country. It is heartbreaking and still hurts even though it is not affecting the state where I live now. It is saying that someone does not deserve to feel comfortable in their body. I want to be able to be a voice for those kids."

== Discography ==
=== EPs ===
- Immaturing (2022)
- Things That Are Bad for Me (2022)

=== Studio albums ===
- Diving Lessons (2023)

=== Singles ===
Year	Song	Album	Producer(s)	Writer(s)
2020	"Sugar Rush"	non-album single	Cavetown	Addison Grace
2020	"Overthink"	non-album single	Addison Grace	Addison Grace & Elie Rizk
2021	"Honeysuckle"	non-album single	Addison Grace	Addison Grace & Charli Adams
2021	"Party Killer"	non-album single	Addison Grace	Addison Grace
2021	"Manic Pixie Dream Girl"	non-album single	Addison Grace & Pete Robertson	Addison Grace & Charli Adams
2021	"Why I Overthink"	non-album single	Addison Grace	Addison Grace & Elie Rizk
2021	"I've Got a Sugar Rush" (ft. Sydney Rose)	non-album single	Cavetown	Addison Grace
2022	"I Wanna Be a Boy"	Immaturing	Jake Aaron	Addison Grace
2022	"Makes Me Sick"	Immaturing	Cameron Hale	Cameron Hale & Addison Grace
2022	"Getting Used To"	Immaturing	Addison Grace (as Wally the Wall Shark)	Michael Hart & Addison Grace
2022	"I Don't Wanna Fall in Love"	Immaturing	Addison Grace (as Wally the Wall Shark)	Addison Grace, Cameron Hale Lazar & Lucas Arens
2022	"Pretty Girl"	Things That Are Bad For Me	Andy Seltzer	Addison Grace, Andy Seltzer & Charli Adams
2022	"If Nobody Likes U"	Things That Are Bad For Me	Cameron Hale	Addison Grace & Robyn Dell'Unto
2022	"Valerie"	Things That Are Bad For Me	Jake Aron	Addison Grace & Charli Adams
2023	"WW3"	non-album single	Roy Kerr	Roy Kerr, Addison Grace, Ross Leighton
2023	"White Lie"	Diving Lessons	Cameron Hale	Addison Grace
2023	"SLIME!"	Diving Lessons	Cavetown	Addison Grace

=== Music videos ===
Year	Title	Director
2020	"Sugar Rush"	Addison Grace
2020	"Overthink"	Addison Grace
2021	"Honeysuckle"	Addison Grace
2021	"Party Killer"	Addison Grace
2021	"Manic Pixie Dream Girl"	Addison Grace
2022	"Makes Me Sick"	Sydney Ostrander
2022	"Pretty Girl"	Sydney Ostrander
2022	"If Nobody Likes U"	Sydney Ostrander
2023	"White Lie"	Sydney Ostrander
2023	"SLIME!"	Sydney Ostrander
