= Olive Burt =

Olive Woolley Burt (1894–1981) was an American teacher and journalist, known as a folklorist for her collection of murder ballads. She was also a prolific author of books.

== Life ==
She was born in Ann Arbor on 26 May 1894, the daughter of Jed F. Wooley and his wife Agnes Forsyth: she had eight brothers. In 1897 the family settled in Salt Lake City. In 1913 she became an elementary school teacher in Washington County, Utah, later moving to Garfield County, Utah. She wrote newspaper article.

In 1918 Olive graduated B.A. from the University of Utah, and in 1922 she married Cyril Ray Burt, with whom she had a son and two daughters. In 1927 she moved back to Salt Lake City, and began work at The Salt Lake Tribune. She later worked as an editor on the Deseret News. There she took it badly that the News would not print her favorable review of Juanita Brooks's edition of the diaries of John D. Lee.

Olive Burt died on 10 September 1981.

== Collecting murder ballads ==
Burt became interested in true crime stories while on The Salt Lake Tribune. She did extensive research on murder ballads and their associated narratives, with fieldwork collecting of unpublished material and a letter to each state historical society. Her 1958 book American Murder Ballads and Their Stories received in 1959 a special Edgar Award. A review in Western Folklore by John Greenway, largely positive, noted the absence of detailed sourcing, and cautioned that newspaper reports of murders (which he said were a major source) were often inaccurate. Minrose Gwin comments that her coverage of African-American material is sparse, though it does mention "Stagolee"; and notes her proposal that "John Brown's Body" should qualify. She further suggests that Burt's remark that the murders in ballads were intra-racial would not apply by the 1960s.

== Books ==
Burt wrote over 50 books, publishing one or two per year over a long period. Many of these were aimed at children, or for instructional purposes. They included a biography of Sarah Josepha Hale, Sarah J. Hale: First Woman Editor (1960).

Some of the children's titles written by Olive Burt include: "Jedediah Smith: Fur Trapper of the Old West" (1951). "John Wanamaker: Boy Merchant" (1952). "The Oak's Long Shadow" (1952). "Ouray the Arrow" (1953). "John Charles Fremont: Trail Marker of the Old West" (1955). "Brigham Young" (1956). "Jim Beckwourth:Crow Chief" (1957). "American Murder Ballads and Their Stories," collected and edited by Olive Woolley Burt (1958). "Ringling Brothers:Circus Boys" (1958). "Space Monkey:The True Story of Miss Baker" (1960). "I Challenge the Dark Sea" (1962). "John Alden: Young Puritan" (1964). "I am an American" (1964). "The Wind Before the Dawn" (1964). "Jayhawker Johnny" (1966). "Old America Comes Alive" (1966). "Born to Teach" (1967). "Young Wayfarers of the Early West" (1968). "The National Road:How America's Vision of a Transcontinental Highway Grew Through Three Centuries to Become a Reality" (1968). "The Story of American Railroads" (1969). "Black Women of Valor" (1974). "The Horse in America" (1975).
