= Joe Ball =

American murderer and suspected serial killer (1896–1938)

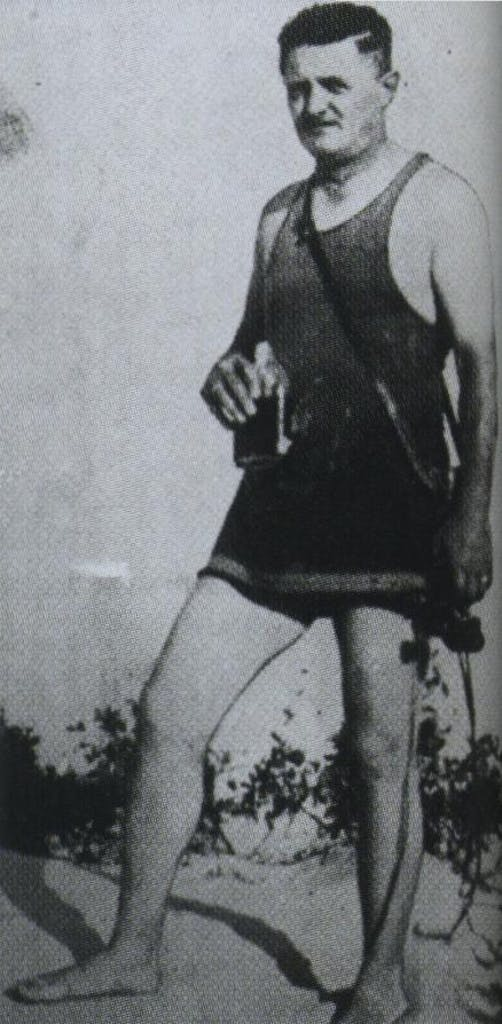
- Born: Joseph Douglas Ball; January 7, 1896; San Antonio, Texas, U.S.
- Died: September 24, 1938 (aged 42); Elmendorf, Texas, U.S.
- Cause of death: Suicide by gunshot
- Other names: The Alligator Man; The Butcher of Elmendorf; The Bluebeard of South Texas
- Spouse: Dolores Goodwin (m. 1937)

Details
- Victims: 2+
- Span of crimes: 1937–1938
- Country: United States
- State: Texas

Joseph Douglas Ball (January 7, 1896 – September 24, 1938) was an American murderer and suspected serial killer, sometimes referred to as the "Alligator Man", the "Butcher of Elmendorf" and the "Bluebeard of South Texas".

== Background ==
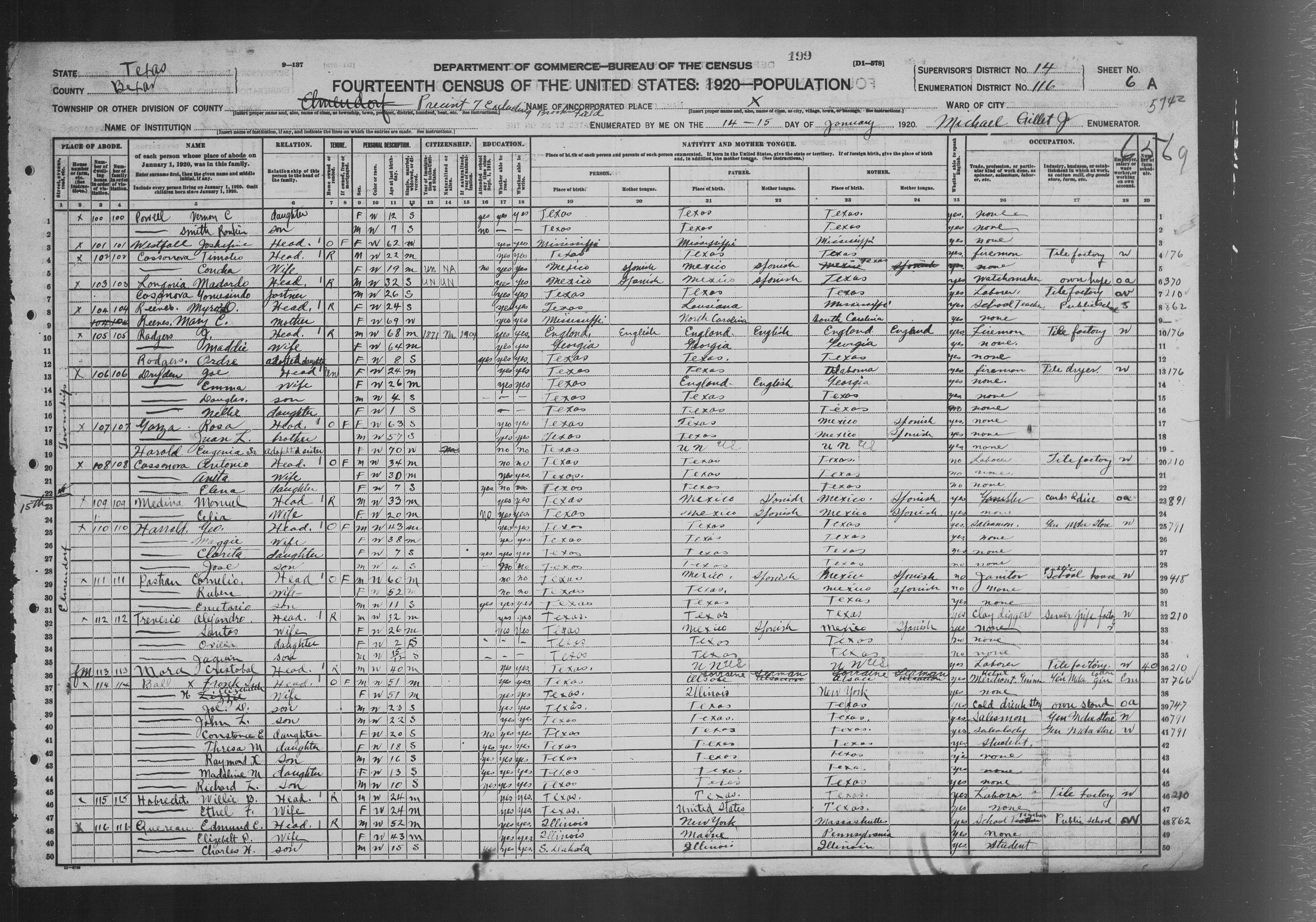
1920 U.S. census with the Ball family on lines 37–45. Joe D. Ball is on line 37.

Joseph Douglas Ball was born in San Antonio to Elizabeth Hart (née Lawler; 1868–1922) and Frank Xavier Ball (1868–1937), a rich farm owner later turned general store owner, as the second of eight children. Joseph Ball's brother, Raymond Ball, was the first mayor of Elmendorf, Texas.

After serving on the frontlines in Europe during World War I, Ball started his career as a bootlegger, providing illegal liquor to those who could pay for it. After the end of Prohibition, he opened a saloon called the Sociable Inn in Elmendorf. He built a pond that contained five alligators and charged people to view them, especially during feeding time; the food consisted mostly of live cats and dogs.

== Murders ==
After a while, women in the area were reported missing, including barmaids. When two Bexar County deputy sheriffs went to question him in 1938, Ball pulled a handgun from his cash register and killed himself with a bullet through the heart (as noted on his death certificate by the coroner, but some sources report that he shot himself in the head).

A handyman who conspired with Ball, Clifford Wheeler, admitted to helping Ball dispose of the bodies of two of the women he had killed. Wheeler described how Ball had killed barmaid Minnie Gotthardt in June 1937, and, later on, fellow barmaid Hazel Brown, also known as "Schatzie", after she fell for a regular customer at the bar and wanted to stop working for Ball. Wheeler led them to the remains of Hazel Brown and Minnie Gotthardt. He was imprisoned for two years as an accessory to murder, whereas the alligators were donated to the San Antonio Zoo. In a 1957 interview, Ball's wife Dolores "Buddy" Goodwin (whose temporary disappearance had been previously attributed to a murder by Ball) claimed that no actual women were thrown into the alligator pit, saying that there were only ever two murders. Ball's nephew, Richard "Bucky" Ball Jr., attributes the crimes to violent trauma experienced during his World War I service.

Few written sources from the era could verify Ball's crimes. Newspaper editor Michael Hall investigated the story in depth in 2002 and wrote on his findings for Texas Monthly.

== In popular culture ==
The film Eaten Alive by Tobe Hooper was inspired by Ball. The film features a man named Judd, a serial killer who runs a hotel and disposes of his victims' bodies by feeding them to a Nile crocodile.

Ball was referenced in Bones in the fifth episode of season eight, "The Method in the Madness".

Macabre wrote a song called "Joe Ball Was His Name" on their album Carnival of Killers.

== See also ==
- List of serial killers nicknamed "Bluebeard"
- List of serial killers in the United States
- List of serial killers by number of victims
