= Murder ballad =

Type of ballad dealing with crime or death

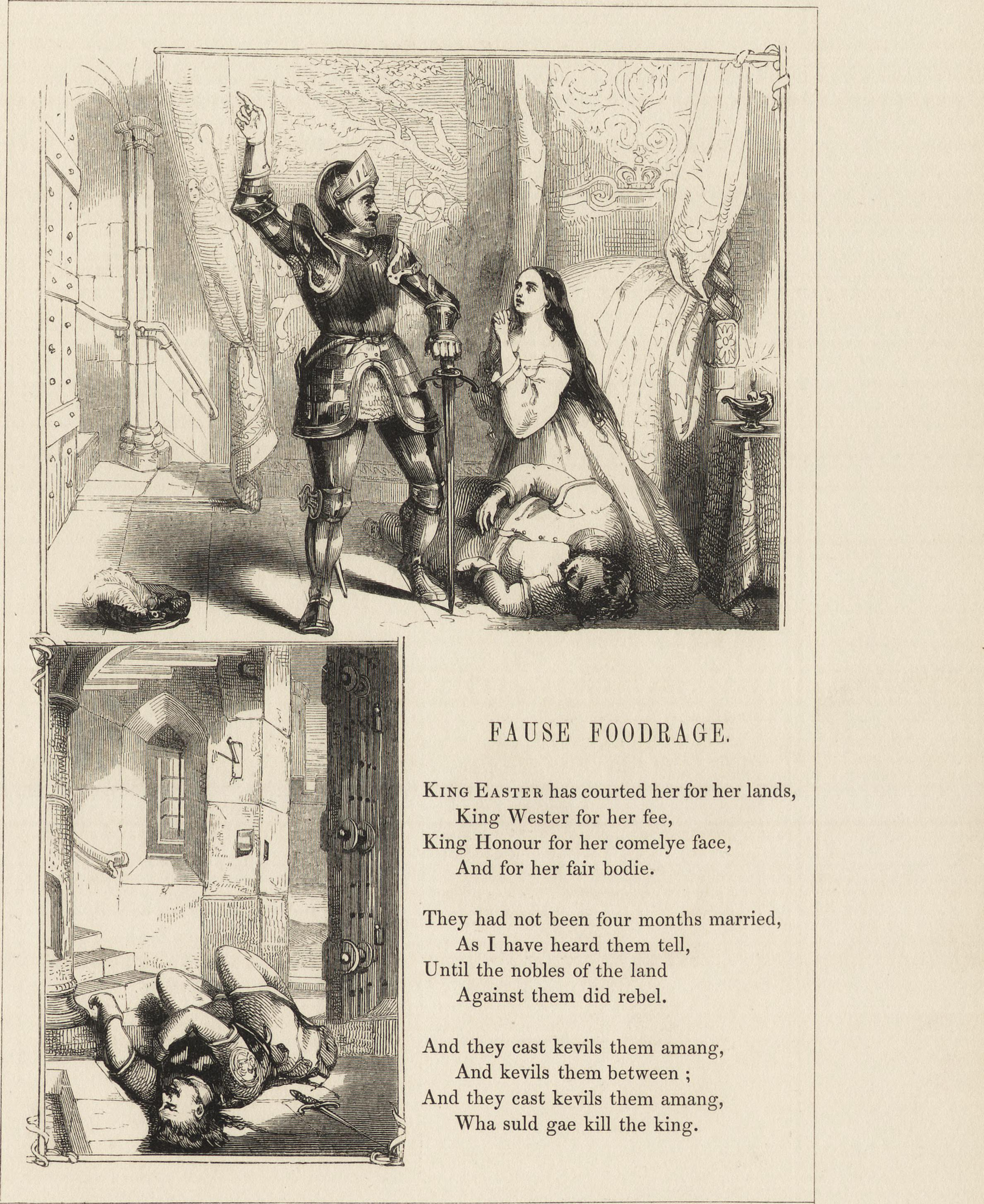
- Fause Foodrage from The Book of British ballads (1842)
- Stylistic origins: Ballad
- Cultural origins: England, Scottish Lowlands, Scandinavia, Iceland, Faroe Islands, Germany and Ireland

Murder ballads are a subgenre of the traditional ballad form dealing with a crime or a gruesome death. Their lyrics form a narrative describing the events of a murder, often including the lead-up and/or aftermath. The term refers to the content, and may be applied to traditional ballads, part of oral culture.

== Definition ==
The term ballad, applied to traditional or folk music, means a narrative song. Within ballads, the "event song" is dedicated to narrating a particular event, and the murder ballad is a type of event song in which the event is a murder. This definition can be applied also to songs composed self-consciously within, or with reference to, the traditional generic conventions. Atkinson, referring to traditional English ballads, comments that "there is no shortage of murders in the corpus of ballads [...] and few of them are concealed with any success."

Some murder ballads tell the story from the point of view of the murderer, or attempt to portray the murderer in a somewhat sympathetic light, such as "Tom Dooley". A recording of that song sold nearly four million copies for The Kingston Trio in 1958. Other murder ballads tell the tale of the crime from the point of view of the victim, such as "Lord Randall", in which the narrator becomes ill and discovers that he has been poisoned. Others tell the story with greater distance, such as "Lamkin", which records the details of the crime and the punishment without any attempt to arouse sympathy for the criminal. Supernatural revenge wrought by the victim upon the murderer sometimes figures in murder ballads such as "The Twa Sisters" (also known as "Binnorie" or "Minnorie" Child Ballad #10).

Daniel A. Cohen comments that the murder ballads should be distinguished from a related genre, "dying verses", intended for reading rather than singing, a New England tradition from the 18th century. Their relation to courtship murders came in the 19th century.

== History ==
Murder ballads make up a notable portion of traditional ballads, many of which originated in Scandinavia, England, and lowland Scotland in the premodern era (suggesting an ultimate Germanic cultural origin). In those, while the murder is committed, the murderer usually suffers justice at the hands of the victim's family, even if the victim and murderer are related (see "Edward/Son David", "The Cruel Brother", and "The Two Sisters" for examples). In these ballads, murderous women usually burn while men hang—see "Lamkin" and some Scottish versions of "The Two Sisters". Within the context of the British Isles, murder ballads are only found in English and Scots-speaking regions (broadly, England, lowland Scotland, and northeastern Ireland), and are not a feature of Gaelic or Welsh-language music.

The details and locales for a particular murder ballad did change over time. For example, "Knoxville Girl" is essentially the same ballad as "The Wexford Girl" with the setting transposed from Ireland to Tennessee—the two of them are based on "The Oxford Girl", a murder ballad set in England. Many American murder ballads are modified versions of Old World ballads with any elements of supernatural retribution removed and the focus transferred to the slaughter of the innocent. For example, the English ballad "The Gosport Tragedy" of the 1750s had both murder and vengeance on the murderer by the ghosts of the murdered woman and her unborn baby, who call up a great storm to prevent his ship sailing before tearing him apart. In contrast, the Kentucky version, "Pretty Polly", has the victim being betrayed by the man she loves, stabbed in the heart, and buried in a shallow grave. The epilogue describes her killer being hanged by the community and his soul burning in hell and a "debt to the Devil" in a few versions.

African music traditions brought by enslaved people blended with the conventions. Olive Burt noted that the murder ballad tradition of the American Old West is distinct to some extent from that of ballads rooted in the old broadside tradition, noting that:

Western settlers found murder and bloodshed fascinating, and composed local ballads. But with printing facilities scarce, many of these items were not published at all while others saw fame only briefly in the columns of the local newspapers. As a result, true western ballads of murder—except those about such famous outlaws as Jesse James, Cole Younger, Sam Bass, and their ilk—have been entirely lost, or are known only to the children of those who knew and sang them. These children are now, of course, old men and women. Some of the best examples of western murder ballads will be lost forever when these people die.

While in Ukrainian folklore tradition the murder ballad genre is not as common, there are few folk songs that fit the genre. One of them is the popular song from the 18th century called "Oi Ne Khody Hrytsiu" written by semi-legendary poet and singer Marusia Churai. In the song a girl named Hanna is in love with a Cossack Hrytz (Greg) and warns him not to go to parties in fear of him being seduced. He doesn't listen and falls in love with another girl. Hanna brews a deadly potion and gives it to Hrytz at supper. When he is buried she goes to his grave and tells him why she did it.

Several historical murder ballads became hit pop songs in the 1950s and 1960s, including the Kingston Trio's "Tom Dooley", which was a #1 Billboard hit in 1958; Lloyd Price's version of "Stagger Lee", which reached the top of the chart in 1959; and Lefty Frizzell's "Long Black Veil", which was a hit for a number of artists over the years.

== In popular culture ==
Tom Lehrer's song, "The Irish Ballad", is a parody of the traditional murder ballad. J.H.P. Pafford, in a review of Olive Burt's American Murder Ballads and their Stories, states that the song contains "a running prose commentary on the incidents described in many [such] ballads."

Suzanne Collins's Mockingjay from The Hunger Games trilogy includes lyrics to the song "The Hanging Tree", which follows Appalachian murder ballad style; music for the song was composed for the third film by James Newton Howard.

Murder ballads inspired by Western movies were popular subjects for the easy listening and adult contemporary music of the late 1960s to early 70s, some based on real life and others on fictional events. "I'm Gonna Get Me A Gun" by Cat Stevens tells the story of Billy the Kid before he began his murder spree, and "Glendale Train" by New Riders of the Purple Sage is about the James Gang murdering two railroad workers during a train robbery. Ones based on fictional stories include "I Did What I Did For Maria" telling the tale of widower's vigilante justice against the bandit who murdered his wife, "Hutchinson Jail" about a prisoner accused of shooting a man, or Tom Jones' "Delilah" about a man stabbing his unfaithful lover in a fit of anger. Murder ballads by female vocalists are often sung from the victim's perspective, such as "Bang Bang" by Cher.

== See also ==
- List of songs about or referencing serial killers
- Narcocorrido
- Teenage tragedy song
- Cantastoria
