= Rät =

2020 single by Penelope Scott

Single by Penelope Scott

from the album Public Void
- Released: August 29, 2020
- Length: 3:14
- Label: Tesla's Pigeon
- Songwriter: Celeste Ferguson
- Producer: Penelope Scott

Penelope Scott singles chronology
"Rät" (2020)	"Born2Run" (2020)

"Rät" is the debut single by American singer Penelope Scott, released on August 29, 2020 from her debut studio album Public Void. It went viral on the video-sharing app TikTok and became her breakout hit. The song is about idolizing yet becoming disillusioned with wealthy leaders of modern science and technology, especially referring to Elon Musk.

== Background ==
The title of the song originates from a 2014 Internet meme joking that Elon Musk is short for "elongated muskrat". According to Penelope Scott, the song was easy to write as she had already planned out the structure, such as having a "crunchy" beat with video game sounds. She did not know a lot about Musk or do research for the song, but chose him to be the focus as she considered him a symbol of business leaders who have much control or influence on people's lives with their new technology and innovation, as well as the reverence for such products from the general public (especially the younger generations). She called the song a "breakup letter to the tech cult that is Silicon Valley." She has also said it addresses ideas that many people are not sure how to discuss, particularly the supposed benefits of new science and technology to the public and the importance of how they are used.

== TikTok virality ==
The song gained traction on TikTok for the wit and criticism in the lyrics. By early 2021, it was used in over 50 thousand videos on the platform, including ones that involve cosplay, art, and makeup.

== Charts ==
Chart performance for "Rät"
Chart (2021)	Peak position
US Hot Rock & Alternative Songs (Billboard)	29

== Certifications ==
Region	Certification	Certified units/sales
United States (RIAA)	Platinum	1,000,000^{‡}
^{‡} Sales+streaming figures based on certification alone.
