= Grim Scary Tales =

Studio album by Macabre
- Released: January 31, 2011
- Genre: Death metal; thrash metal; grindcore
- Length: 49:36
- Label: Hammerheart, Willowtip
- Producer: Geoff Montgomery

Macabre chronology
Murder Metal (2003)	Grim Scary Tales (2011)	Carnival of Killers (2020)

Grim Scary Tales is the fifth album by American extreme metal band Macabre released in 2011. The album cover depicts the notorious Romanian prince Vlad the Impaler holding a goblet filled with blood. The album focuses on historical figures famous for killing people, such as Vlad Tepes, Countess Bathory, Gilles de Rais, and Nero. It has been described as "primitive death metal, occasionally erupting into nursery rhyme or cartoon-theme melodies, and the vocals go back and forth between guttural growls and high-pitched, hoarse shrieking". It is also Macabre's first release since Murder Metal in 2003.

== Concept ==
The album focuses on historical figures famous for killing people, such as Vlad Tepes, Countess Bathory, Gilles de Rais, and Nero. Corporate Death described the album concept as "document[ing] the history of murder from the earliest recorded killers in chronological order", and suggested that there would be a second part "finish[ing] the timeline".

== Reception ==
Professional ratings
Review scores
Source	Rating
About.com	2.5/5 stars
Allmusic	3/5 stars

George Pacheco, in About.com, described Grim Scary Tales as "more of a novelty than anything else, despite the band's crisp, thrash riffs and steamroller rhythms" and suggested the album "isn't really worth more than a few cursory, curious spins at best". Allmusic's Phil Freeman was also ambivalent about the album, suggesting that "longtime Macabre fans, who find depth in the band's lyrical fixations, will doubtless be thrilled at their heroes' return. Most metalheads, and everyone else, can safely skip this one, though".

== Track listing ==
1. "Locusta" – 2:57 - Locusta
2. "Nero's Inferno" – 2:43 - Nero
3. "The Black Knight" – 4:05 - Gilles de Rais
4. "Dracula" – 5:10 - Vlad Tepes
5. "The Big Bad Wolf" – 4:06 - Gilles Garnier
6. "Countess Bathory" (Venom cover) – 3:26 - Elizabeth Bathory
7. "Burke and Hare" – 4:17 - Brendan "Dynes" Burke and William Hare
8. "Mary Ann" – 3:27 - Mary Ann Cotton
9. "The Bloody Benders" – 2:46 - The Bender Family
10. "Lizzie Borden" – 1:33 - Lizzie Borden
11. "The Ripper Tramp from France" – 3:38 - Joseph Vacher
12. "Bella the Butcher" – 3:00 - Belle Gunness
13. "The Kiss of Death" – 3:24 - Béla Kiss
14. "The Sweet Tender Meat Vendor" - 5:04 - Carl Großmann

== Credits ==
- Corporate Death - Guitars, Vocals
- Nefarious - Bass, Vocals
- Dennis The Menace - Drums
