= Uzhur =

Town in Krasnoyarsk Krai, Russia

Uzhur Ужур
- Town
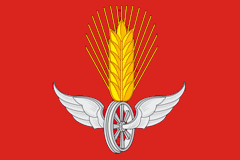
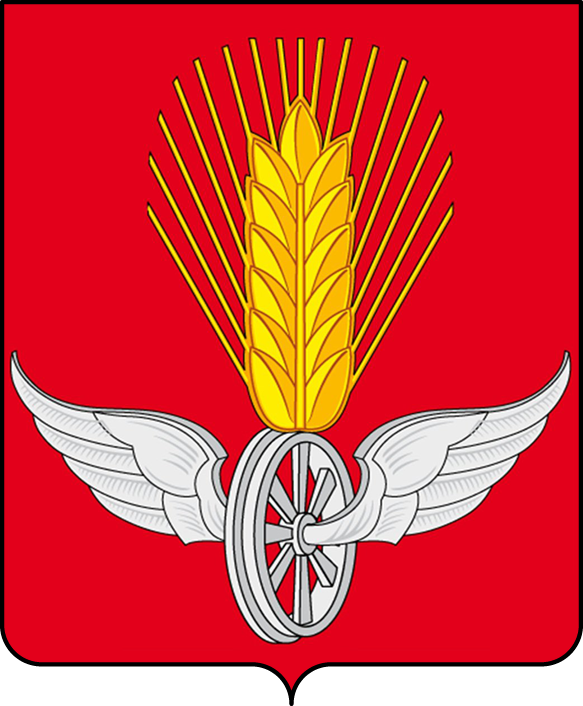
- Flag Coat of arms
- Interactive map of Uzhur
- Location of Uzhur Uzhur (Krasnoyarsk Krai)
- Coordinates: 55°19′03″N 89°49′21″E
- Country: Russia
- Federal subject: Krasnoyarsk Krai
- Administrative district: Uzhursky District
- District townSelsoviet: Uzhur
- Founded: 1760
- Elevation: 380 m (1,250 ft)

Population (2010 Census)
  - Total: 16,093
  - Estimate (2021): 14,134 (−12.2%)

Administrative status
  - Capital of: Uzhursky District, district town of Uzhur

Municipal status
  - Municipal district: Uzhursky Municipal District
  - Urban settlement: Uzhur Urban Settlement
  - Capital of: Uzhursky Municipal District, Uzhur Urban Settlement
- Time zone: UTC+7 (MSK+4)
- Postal code: 662250–662255
- OKTMO ID: 04656101001
- Website: uzur-admin.ru

Uzhur (Russian: Ужу́р) is a town and the administrative center of Uzhursky District in Krasnoyarsk Krai, Russia, located approximately 300 kilometers (190 mi) from Krasnoyarsk between Kuznetsk Alatau and Solgon mountain ranges where the Chernavka River flows into the Uzhurka. Population: 16,093 (2010 census); 17,252 (2002 census); 28,376 (1989 Soviet census).

== History ==
It was founded in 1760 as the seat of Uzhurskaya Volost. First it was a small village, but it grew and in 1953 it was granted town status.

== Administrative and municipal status ==
Within the framework of administrative divisions, Uzhur serves as the administrative center of Uzhursky District. As an administrative division, it is incorporated within Uzhursky District as the district town of Uzhur. As a municipal division, the district town of Uzhur is incorporated within Uzhursky Municipal District as Uzhur Urban Settlement.

== Economy ==
The economy of the town is based on well-developed agriculture and the railway line. The most developed agricultural aspects are crops growing, dairy and milk production, and cattle and sheep breeding. There are about fifty different businesses in Uzhur. 90% of all production is food industry. Some part of it is exported all over Krasnoyarsk Krai.

== Military ==
Uzhur is home to the 62nd Missile Division of the Strategic Rocket Forces of Russia and houses a base containing several R-36M ICBMs.

== Notable people ==
- Tamara Samsonova (born 1947), suspected serial killer
- Viktor Vladislavovich Zubarev (born 1973), politician
