= Skynd (band) =

Australian industrial band

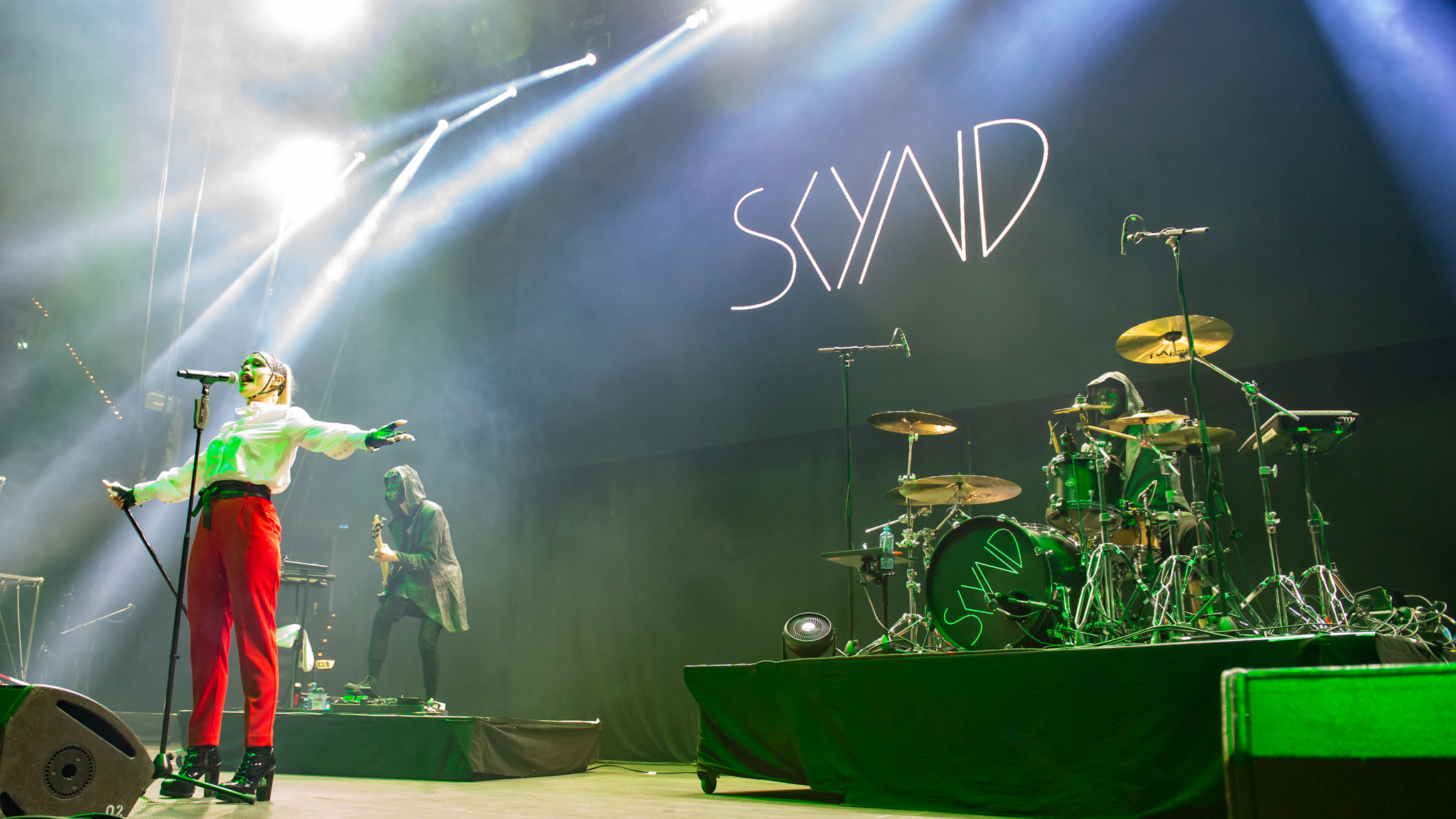
- Skynd at Rock im Park 2022

Background information
- Origin: Sydney, Australia
- Genre: Industrial rock
- Years active: 2017–present
- Members: Skynd; Father
- Website: skynd-music.com

Skynd (stylised as SKYND) is an Australian industrial rock band consisting of a lead singer named Skynd and a multi-instrumentalist named Father. Their music applies the grim aesthetic of true crime, with songs largely based on disturbing deaths and murders. They have released songs about topics such as the death of Elisa Lam, the manslaughter of Conrad Roy, and the mass suicide in Jonestown.

== History ==
Skynd is known for her diverse vocal styles, ranging from high pitch to low pitch and often with an inhuman element. Notably, Jonathan Davis of Korn is a fan and joined Skynd in her song "Gary Heidnik". Davis appeared in the music video as well.

Skynd's first headliner performance was at Electrowerkz in 2019 where she dressed in a motley combination of corpse paint and Victorian-styled clothing. Fans were greeted with cups of Kool-Aid as a reference to her song about the Jonestown massacre. Shortly after, Skynd was shortlisted as a Heavy Music Awards 2020 Finalist.

Skynd has been interviewed by The Boo Crew on Episode 90 of the Bloody Disgusting podcast, as well as by Ebony Story of Wall of Sound.

== Discography ==
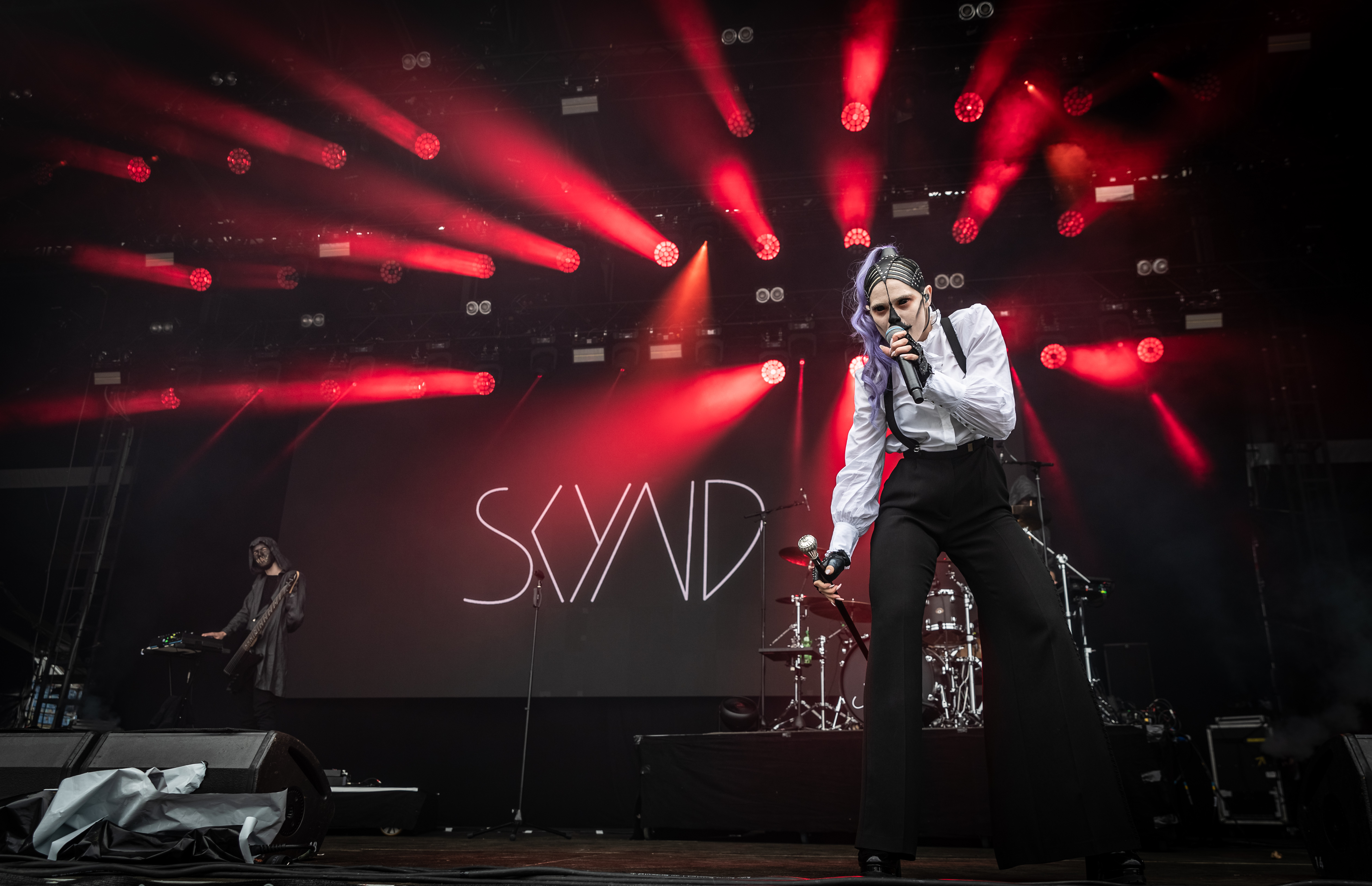
Skynd live at Rock am Ring 2022

=== EPs ===
- Chapter I (2018)
- Chapter II (2019)
- Chapter VII: The Red Winter (2026)
- Chapter VIII: The Open Secret (2026)

=== Singles ===
- "Elisa Lam" (2018)
- "Gary Heidnik" (feat. Jonathan Davis) (2018)
- "Richard Ramirez" (2018)
- "Jim Jones" (2019)
- "Katherine Knight" (2019)
- "Tyler Hadley" (2019)
- "Columbine" (feat. Bill $aber) (2020)
- "Michelle Carter" (2021)
- "Chris Watts" (2022)
- "Armin Meiwes" (2022)
- "John Wayne Gacy" (2022)
- "Edmund Kemper" (2023)
- "Robert Hansen" (2023)
- "Bianca Devins" (2023)
- "Heaven's Gate" (2024)
- "Violets are Blue" (2024)
- "Aileen Wuornos" (2025)
- "Mary Bell" (2026)
- "Andrei Chikatilo" (2026)
- "Tamara Samsonova" (2026)
- "Mikhail Popkov" (2026)
- "Jimmy Savile" (with Swarm) (2026)
- "Johnny Kitagawa" (2026)
- "Danny Masterson" (2026)
