= Neal Long =

American serial killer

- Born: Neal Bradley Long; September 19, 1927; Campton, Kentucky, U.S.
- Died: June 12, 1998 (aged 70); Federal Medical Center, Rochester, Minnesota, U.S.
- Other names: "The Shotgun Slayer" "The Midnight Slayer"
- Motive: Anger over desegregation White supremacy
- Convictions: Federal; First degree murder of a federal employee Interference with a federally provided activity resulting in death Ohio; Aggravated murder (2 counts); Murder
- Penalty: Life imprisonment

Details
- Victims: 4–7+
- Span of crimes: 1972–1975
- Country: United States
- State: Ohio
- Date apprehended: September 19, 1975

Neal Bradley Long (September 19, 1927 – June 12, 1998), known as The Shotgun Slayer, was an American serial killer responsible for at least 21 attacks against African-American men in Dayton, Ohio between 1972 and September 1975, as a result of which between four and seven people died and 14 others were wounded. Following his arrest, Long confessed to the murders, saying he was outraged by desegregation, and pleaded guilty. He received several life terms and died in a federal prison in Minnesota in 1998.

== Biography ==
Not much is known about Long's upbringing. He was born on September 19, 1927, in Campton, Kentucky, but moved to Dayton in 1944 where he would spend most of his life prior to his arrest. In the late 1940s, he married and went on to have seven children.

Problems began to arise in the mid-1960s, when Neal began showing signs of mental illness and displayed violent behavior directed at Black people. On October 31, 1966, he went to the police station and claimed that in the summer of 1944, when he was 17, he and a friend had been attacked by two Black men on Washington Street. Long claimed that he had stabbed the man in self-defense and then fled the scene, leaving the man bleeding on the ground. He was temporarily detained but later released as authorities were unable to find any record of such an incident occurring at the time and location Long had indicated.

Due to his deteriorating mental health, Long sought help from a psychiatrist in 1968. He then voluntarily agreed to undergo treatment at the Dayton Mental Health Center. During his three-month stay there, he was diagnosed with a psychopathic personality disorder.

Long also held a lifelong interest in firearms and military paraphernalia, owning several pistols and shotguns in his private collection. At the time of his arrest, he was going through divorce procedures and worked at a service station in Kettering.

In 2016, the Dayton Daily News published an article wherein a former Dayton police officer claimed Long to have been the person who killed Lester Mitchell, an African American man, in 1966. Mitchell's death was the immediate cause of the 1966 Dayton race riot, and his murderer has never been found.

== Murder of Charles Glatt and exposure ==
On the afternoon of September 19, 1975, Long entered the Federal Office building and asked for 46-year-old sociologist Doctor Charles A. Glatt. When Dr. Glatt replied, Long shot him four times in the neck, chest, and abdomen with a pistol. A few minutes later, Long was arrested by guards. Glatt was sent to the hospital to be treated for his injuries, but died due to complications three hours after the shooting.

Glatt worked at Ohio State University and was considered one of the leading experts in the design and implementation of desegregation busing programs in major American cities. By 1975, he had developed plans to end segregation in public schools in 18 states, and early that year, he had been appointed by the 6th Circuit Court of Appeals to develop a similar program for the Dayton school system, which was to be completed by November 3. Long later stated that his motive for killing Glatt was his desegregation programs, which would put together Black students with the majority white students. Long believed this would supposedly result in conflict, a higher crime rate, and his 12-year-old son, Mark, being physically assaulted by African-American children.

After his arrest, Long admitted that he had committed between 25 and 30 attacks against Black people in Dayton whilst under the influence of alcohol and drugs between 1972 and 1975. Long shot them from his Ford Fairlane using a double-barrel shotgun, resulting in several deaths. The murders caused a moral panic, with the perpetrator dubbed 'The Shotgun Slayer' or 'The Midnight Slayer'. As a result, a reward of $10,000 was offered for information leading to the capture of the elusive killer, with townspeople patrolling the streets at night and various civil rights groups asking the city to declare a state of emergency. In their efforts to solve the case, Dayton police unsuccessfully sought assistance from the FBI. Initially, Long's testimony was doubted, but in the following weeks, he was identified as the shooter by several survivors and witnesses. When his apartment was searched, police found several shotguns and pistols covered by pillow cases.

Following this, after comparing Long's testimony with the dates, geographic data, and times of year when he allegedly committed the murders, the investigators charged him with several attacks and six murders (separate from the Glatt killing). Long was charged with shooting Eddie Freson on August 21, 1972, who was wounded, but survived; the September 26, 1973, murder of Edward Tillman and wounding of James Watts; the May 23, 1975, shooting at a crowd of African-Americans gathered at a party, resulting in gunshot wounds to the arm of George Ingram; the July 1975 murders of 27-year-old Larry Romine in Dayton View and 21-year-old Robert Hoard on Cincinnati Street; and finally, the attempted murders of Leonard Goff and Glenda Gay, which occurred a few days after the Romine-Hoard shootings. According to Long himself, his motivation was his hatred towards black people.

== Trial ==
In late September, at one of the pre-trial hearings, Long's lawyers filed a motion for a forensic psychiatric evaluation to establish whether their client was sane, which was granted. The results, released on November 4, established that Neal Long was sane and subject to criminal liability.

The trial began in late 1976, beginning with the murder of Charles Glatt. At trial, Long fully admitted his guilt and expressed remorse for his crimes. In November 1976, he pleaded guilty in federal court to civil rights charges and first degree murder in relation to the killing of Glatt, and on December 27, was sentenced to two consecutive life terms. In 1977, Long pleaded guilty to three counts of murder in state court to avoid a possible death sentence and received three additional life terms plus 22 to 85 years. Prosecutors granted the plea due to concerns over witness testimony; Leonard Goff had since died of a drug overdose.

== Death ==
Due to the high-profile nature of his crimes and for his own safety, Long spent the remainder of his life in various federal institutions outside Ohio under an assumed name. In the mid-1990s, he was transferred to the Federal Medical Center in Rochester, Minnesota, where he died on June 12, 1998.

== See also ==
- List of serial killers in the United States
- Christopher Peterson, African American serial killer known as "The Shotgun Killer" who claimed to be motivated by hatred of White people
- Joseph Paul Franklin, known as "The Racist Killer" for his murders which were motivated by a white supremacist ideology
