= Public Void =

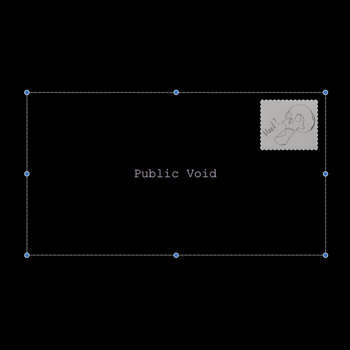

Studio album by Penelope Scott
- Released: September 25, 2020
- Genres: Alternative pop; indie pop; hyperpop
- Length: 26:09
- Label: Tesla's Pigeon
- Producer: Penelope Scott

Penelope Scott chronology
The Junkyard 2 (2020)	Public Void (2020)	Hazards (2021)

Singles from Public Void
- 1. "Cigarette Ahegao" Released: April 5, 2020; 2. "Lotta True Crime" Released: May 26th, 2020

Public Void is the debut studio album by Penelope Scott, released on September 25, 2020, through Tesla's Pigeon. The album combines elements of indie pop, alternative pop, and hyperpop. The album reached its peak on Lithuanian Neighbouring Rights Association and the song, "Rät", which became popular on Tiktok, reached No. 22 on the Billboard Hot Rock & Alternative Songs chart.

== Background ==
Penelope Scott is an American singer, songwriter and producer. In 2018, She began publishing her songs online on SoundCloud under the name Honey Morello. She posted her first EP, Goblin Hours, on Bandcamp on October 24, 2019. She then released the compilation album Junkyard on February 27, 2020, followed shortly by the release of The Junkyard 2 on May 13, 2020.

Public Void, was released on Bandcamp on August 29, 2020, then released on September 25, 2020 through many streaming services. She did the album all by herself. The title “public void” refers to the first two words in a Java method that returns nothing.

== Track listing ==
All tracks are written by Penelope Scott.

Public Void track listing
No.	Title	Length
1.	"Cigarette Ahegao"	2:38
2.	"Lotta True Crime"	3:27
3.	"American Healthcare (Glitzy)"	4:29
4.	"Feel Better"	4:12
5.	"Moonsickness"	5:14
6.	"Dumpster"	2:32
7.	"Rät"	3:14
Total length:		26:09

== Personnel ==
Credits adapted from liner notes.

- Penelope Scott – production, lyrics, instruments, beats
