= Gloom (album) =

Studio album by Macabre
- Released: 1989
- Recorded: Chicago Recording Company June 1989
- Genre: Death metal; thrash metal; grindcore
- Length: 24:33
- Label: Vinyl Solutions

Macabre chronology
Grim Reality (1987)	Gloom (1989)	Sinister Slaughter (1993)

Professional ratings
Review scores
Source	Rating
AllMusic	1.5/5 stars

Gloom is the debut album of American extreme metal band Macabre, released in 1989. Several versions of this album exist. Some versions include the Grim Reality EP, other include a few live tracks and two songs from the Grim Reality EP.

== Track listing ==
1. "Embalmer"
2. "Trampled to Death" - The Who concert disaster
3. "Holidays of Horror" - Ronald Gene Simmons
4. "Fritz Haarmann the Butcher" - Fritz Haarmann
5. "Evil Ole Soul" - Joachim Kroll
6. "Harvey Glatman (Your Soul Will Forever Rot)" - Harvey Glatman
7. "McMassacre" - James Huberty
8. "David Brom Took an Axe" - David Brom
9. "Cremator" - Marcel Petiot
10. "Nostradamus" - Nostradamus
11. "I Need to Kill" - Joseph Kallinger
12. "Ultra Violent"
13. "Rat Man"
14. "Hey Laurie Dann" - Laurie Dann
15. "Patrick Purdy Killed Five and Wounded Thirty" - Patrick Purdy
16. "Exhumer"
17. "Dr. Holmes (He Stripped Their Bones)" - Herman Mudgett
18. "The Green River Murderer (He's Still out There)" - Gary Ridgway
19. "Funeral Home"
20. "Disease" ¹
21. "Natural Disaster" ¹
22. "What the Heck Richard Speck (Eight Nurses You Wrecked)" ²
23. "Ultra Violent" ²
24. "Funeral Home" ²
25. "Mr. Albert Fish (Was Children Your Favorite Dish?)" ²
26. "Fritz Haarmann the Butcher" ²
27. "Killing Spree" ²

¹ Taken from Grim Reality
² Recorded live in April 1986

== Credits ==
- Corporate Death - guitars, vocals
- Nefarious - bass guitar, vocals
- Dennis The Menace - drums
