= Leonarda Cianciulli =

Italian serial killer

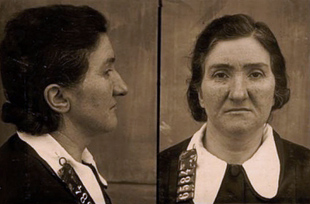
- Leonarda Cianciulli mugshot
- Born: 14 April 1894; Montella, Avellino, Italy
- Died: 15 October 1970 (aged 76); Pozzuoli, Naples, Italy
- Other name: "The Soap-Maker of Correggio" (Italian: la Saponificatrice di Correggio)
- Known for: Serial killer, cannibal
- Criminal charge: 3 murders
- Criminal penalty: 33 years of detention

Leonarda Cianciulli (14 April 1894 – 15 October 1970) was an Italian serial killer and cannibal. Better known as the Soap-Maker of Correggio (Italian: la Saponificatrice di Correggio), she murdered three women in the town of Correggio, Reggio Emilia, in 1939 and 1940, and turned their bodies into soap (using caustic soda) and teacakes.

== Early life ==
Leonarda Cianciulli was born in Montella, Avellino, in what was then the Kingdom of Italy. She attempted suicide twice in her youth. In 1917, Cianciulli married a registry office clerk, Raffaele Pansardi. Her mother did not approve of the marriage, as she had planned to marry her to another man. Cianciulli later claimed that on this occasion her mother had cursed them. In 1921, the couple moved to Pansardi's native town of Lauria, Potenza, where Cianciulli was sentenced and imprisoned for fraud in 1927. When released, the couple moved to Lacedonia, Avellino. After their home was destroyed in the 1930 Irpinia earthquake, they moved once more to Correggio, Reggio Emilia, where Cianciulli opened a small shop. She was very popular and well-respected within her neighbourhood.

Cianciulli had seventeen pregnancies during her marriage but lost three of the children to miscarriage. Ten more died in their youth. Consequently, Cianciulli was heavily protective of the four surviving children. Her fears were fuelled by a warning she had received some time earlier from a fortune teller, who said that she would marry and have children, but that all of the children would die young. Reportedly, Cianciulli also visited a Romani who practised palm reading, and who told her, "In your right hand I see prison, in your left a criminal asylum".

== Murders ==
In 1939, Cianciulli learned that her eldest son and favourite child, Giuseppe, was going to join the Royal Italian Army in preparation for the Second World War. She was determined to protect him at all costs and came to the conclusion that his safety required human sacrifices. Cianciulli found her victims in three middle-aged women, all neighbours.

=== Faustina Setti ===
The first of Cianciulli's victims, Faustina Setti, was a lifelong spinster who had come to her for help in finding a husband. Cianciulli told her of a suitable partner in Pola but asked her to tell no one of the news. She also persuaded Setti to write letters and postcards to relatives and friends. They were to be mailed when she reached Pola, to tell them that everything was fine. Preparing for her departure, Setti came to visit Cianciulli one last time in December of 1939. Cianciulli killed her with an axe and dragged the body into a closet, where she cut it into nine parts, gathering the blood into a basin. Cianciulli described what happened next in her official statement:

I threw the pieces into a pot, added seven kilos of caustic soda, which I had bought to make soap, and stirred the mixture until the pieces dissolved in a thick, dark mush that I poured into several buckets and emptied in a nearby septic tank. As for the blood in the basin, I waited until it had coagulated, dried it in the oven, ground it and mixed it with flour, sugar, chocolate, milk and eggs, as well as a bit of margarine, kneading all the ingredients together. I made lots of crunchy tea cakes and served them to the ladies who came to visit, though Giuseppe and I also ate them.

Some sources also record that Cianciulli apparently received Setti's life savings, 30,000 lire, as payment for her services.

=== Francesca Soavi ===
Francesca Soavi was the second victim. Cianciulli claimed to have found her a job at a school for girls in Piacenza. Like with Setti, Cianciulli persuaded her to write postcards to be sent to friends, this time from Correggio, detailing her plans. Also like Setti, Soavi came to visit Cianciulli before her departure. Cianciulli gave her drugged wine and killed her with an axe. The murder occurred on 5 September 1940. Cianciulli disposed of the body in the same way as Setti's and is said to have obtained 3,000 lire from her second victim.

=== Virginia Cacioppo ===
Cianciulli's third and final victim was the widow Virginia Cacioppo, a former soprano said to have sung at La Scala. For her, Cianciulli claimed to have found work as the secretary for a mysterious impresario in Florence. As with the other two women, Cianciulli instructed her not to tell a single person where she was going. Cacioppo agreed and, on 30 September 1940, came for a last visit to Cianciulli. The pattern of the murder was the same as the first two. However, unlike the first two victims, Cianciulli melted the body to make soap. According to Cianciulli's statement:

She ended up in the pot, like the other two ... her flesh was fat and white, when it had melted I added a bottle of cologne, and after a long time on the boil I was able to make some most acceptable creamy soap. I gave bars to neighbours and acquaintances. The cakes, too, were better: that woman was really sweet.

From Cacioppo, Cianciulli reportedly received 50,000 lire, assorted jewels and public bonds. She even sold all the victims' clothing and shoes.

== Discovery and trial ==
Cacioppo's sister-in-law, Albertina Fanti, grew suspicious of her sudden disappearance and had last seen her entering Cianciulli's house. She reported her fears to the superintendent of police in Reggio Emilia, who opened an investigation and soon arrested Cianciulli. Cianciulli did not confess to the murders until their suspicion fell on her son, Giuseppe Pansardi. She then provided detailed accounts of what she had done to absolve her son from any blame.

Cianciulli was tried for murder in Reggio Emilia in 1946. She remained unrepentant, going so far as to correct the official account while on the stand:

At her trial in Reggio Emilia last week Poetess Leonarda gripped the witness-stand rail with oddly delicate hands and calmly set the prosecutor right on certain details. Her deep-set dark eyes gleamed with a wild inner pride as she concluded: "I gave the copper ladle, which I used to skim the fat off the kettles, to my country, which was so badly in need of metal during the last days of the war ..."

Cianciulli was found guilty and sentenced to thirty years in prison and three years in a criminal asylum. She died of cerebral apoplexy in the women's criminal asylum in Pozzuoli on 15 October 1970.

A number of artefacts from the case, including the pot in which the victims were boiled, are on display at the Criminological Museum in Rome.

A darkly comic play about Cianciulli, Love and Magic in Mama's Kitchen, was first produced by Lina Wertmüller at the Spoleto Festival in 1979. The play began a run on Broadway in 1983.

== Media depictions ==
=== Cinema ===
- Black Journal by Mauro Bolognini
- La Saponificatrice – Vita di Leonarda Cianciulli by Alessandro Quadretti
- Da Lucia by Roberto Capucci Blue Suede Shoots
- Leonarda by Luca Brinciotti with Rosaria Cianciulli, 2015 short film

=== Television ===
- Deadly Women

=== Music ===
- "Confessions of an Embittered Soul (Leonarda Cianciulli)" by Church of Misery
- "Tea Cakes (Leonarda Cianciulli)" by the band Macabre

=== Theatre ===
- Amore e Magia nella Cucina di Mamma by Lina Wertmüller
- Leonarda Cianciulli: Storia di una serial Killer by Andrea Pilato

== See also ==
- List of incidents of cannibalism
- List of serial killers by country
- List of serial killers by number of victims
