= Penelope Scott =

American singer-songwriter (born 2000)

- Also known as: Honey Morello
- Born: 2000 (age 25–26)
- Genres: Indie folk; chiptune; electroclash
- Occupations: Musician; singer-songwriter; record producer
- Years active: 2018–present
- Labels: Tesla's Pigeon; Many Hats Distribution
- Website: penelopescott.com & honeymorello.com

Penelope Scott, also known by her alias Honey Morello, is an American musician, singer-songwriter, and producer.

In 2020, Scott released two compilation albums of demos, Junkyard and The Junkyard 2, followed by her debut album, Public Void. Her song "Rät" went viral shortly after its release, peaking at no. 29 on Billboard's Hot Rock & Alternative Songs Chart. Scott then released the EP Hazards in 2021, followed by two more EPs, Girl's Night and Mysteries for Rats in 2023.

Scott had produced all of her music until 2025, when she released her second studio album, Water Dogs, produced by Max Hershenow.

Scott's third studio album, Fear of God, was released on April 24th, 2026.

== Background ==
=== Early life and career ===
Scott grew up in California. Scott's father taught her how to use a microphone and introduced her to the technical side of music, using experience he gained during his time working as a roadie on tour. Scott's mother encouraged her to take piano lessons around eight or nine years old, and she continued to until her mid-teens. In middle and high school, Scott focused on learning pop songs by ear, writing lyrics, and learning to record. After graduating high school, Scott started college.There she joined her college's choir and learned to play the guitar. Scott majored in political science, while also taking courses in philosophy and computer science. In her senior year, she took a music production class, which was taught online due to the COVID-19 pandemic. As a result, Scott initially learned to produce remotely using the free software LMMS rather than Pro Tools, which she began using later.

Scott began publishing her songs online on SoundCloud in 2018, under the name Honey Morello. She posted her first EP, Goblin Hours, on Bandcamp on October 24, 2019. She released the compilation album Junkyard on February 27, 2020, followed shortly by the release of The Junkyard 2 on May 13, 2020. The songs on the latter explored sensitive topics such as emotional labor, insecurity, and healthcare. A song from that album, "Sweet Hibiscus Tea", also went viral the same month it was released. Scott was surprised at the success of The Junkyard 2 considering its lack of mixing.

=== 2020–2022: Public Void and Hazards EP ===
Scott's debut album, Public Void, was initially released on Bandcamp on August 29, 2020, then released September 25, 2020 on streaming services. In late 2020, her music found a larger audience on the short-form video-sharing app TikTok. A song off Public Void, "Rät", went viral on the app in November 2020. The song expresses disappointment with Silicon Valley and technology billionaires, specifically Elon Musk. "Rät" peaked at 29 on Billboard's Hot Rock & Alternative Songs Chart. Music producer Jesse Cannon cited Scott and the song's success as an example of artists reaching an audience beyond their niche, and calling its lyrics "so extremely online".

On November 4, 2020, Scott released the single "Born2Run", clips of which went viral prior to its official release. The song garnered attention after the January 6 United States Capitol attack, due to its lyrics describing a similar but fictional storming of the Capitol by politically involved youth. On April 30, 2021, Scott was featured on the song "Brittle, Baby!" by Char Chris. She also appeared in its video as an animated version of herself.

In July 2021, Scott released the song "7 O'Clock" and announced an EP, Hazards, which released on August 27, 2021, through Many Hats Distribution. She released the song "Dead Girls" as a single a day before the EP's release. In July 2021, Scott announced her first tour to support Hazards, beginning on the US West Coast in December 2021. She also announced East Coast tour dates for January 2022, but these were canceled due to concerns about then rising numbers of COVID-19 cases. In December 2021, Scott covered Carrie Underwood's "Before He Cheats" for an episode of the Recording Academy's ReImagined.

In May 2022, Scott played at the Belltown Bloom music festival in Seattle. In June, she began another U.S. headlining tour, supported by Rosie Tucker, fanclubwallet, and Yot Club. Scott then embarked on a UK/EU tour in July, supported by Addison Grace. In October 2022, she was featured on Cincinnati-based artist Lincoln's song "Baby Take My Acid", which appeared on his debut album Everything is Wrong.

=== 2023–2024: Mysteries for Rats / Girl's Night ===
On September 20, 2023, Scott released the single "Gross", followed by the single "Time of My Life" on October 12. On September 25, she announced a pair of EPs, Girl's Night and Mysteries for Rats, which released on November 3 and November 17 respectively.

Scott stated that she decided split the release into two EPs to differentiate their sound, saying "Whereas before, if you were buying one CD or record, you would want quantity, now you can pick the songs individually and put them in your playlist. I think being reserved and sorting the songs beforehand by vibe is a way to make the work more pleasant to the listener." Both EPs were combined as the double EP Mysteries for Rats / Girl's Night for their vinyl release.

On September 29, 2024, Scott appeared on a remix of Shauna Dean Cokeland's "Last Best Pop Stars".

=== 2025–present: Water Dogs and Fear of God ===
On February 27, 2025, Scott released the single "Girl's Always Right" alongside the announcement of her second studio album, Water Dogs, which released on March 14, 2025.

On October 24th, 2025, Scott released the single "Y2Kbaby". On February 13, 2026, she released another single titled “Loser”. On March 20th, 2026, Scott released the single 'See You In Hell' alongside an announcement for her new album titled 'Fear Of God', released on April 24th, 2026.

In July 2026, Scott released a single, Halloween in July and an album, ping, under her Honey Morello alias.

== Recognition ==
In November 2020, Scott appeared on Rolling Stone's Breakthrough 25, which showcases artists with large gains in streaming numbers—she was fifth, with 5.4 million streams that week. Her song "Rät" appeared in the Top 40 of Billboard's Hot Rock & Alternative Songs. Billboard's Danielle Chelosky said of her music, "Sonically, it's like being inside of a videogame; lyrically, it's like scrolling a Tumblr meme page of an edgy teenage girl."

Scott has been described as an example of TikTok allowing music artists to be successful without signing to a label; she reached three million monthly listeners on Spotify without substantial media coverage. By March 2021, her music had been streamed an estimated 88 million times in the U.S., and her has over 150 million views as of October 2025.

== Musical style and influences ==
Scott's music has been called "baroque punk". Chelosky said that her music features aspects of hyperpop. Scott said that she has "been waiting for anyone to come up with an accurate description" of her genre of music.

== Discography ==
=== Albums ===
==== Studio albums ====
Title	Album details	Peak chart positions
Title	Album details	LIT
Public Void	Released: August 29, 2020; Label: Tesla's Pigeon; Format: Digital download, streaming, CD, vinyl	86
Water Dogs	Released: March 14, 2025; Label: Many Hats Distribution; Format: Digital download, streaming, CD, vinyl	
Fear of God	Released: April 24, 2026; Label: Tesla's Pigeon; Format: Digital download, CD, streaming, vinyl	

==== Compilation albums ====
Title	Album details
Junkyard	Released: February 27, 2020; Label: Self-released; Format: Digital download, streaming, vinyl
The Junkyard 2	Released: May 13, 2020; Label: Self-released; Format: Digital download, streaming, vinyl, CD

=== Extended plays ===
Title	EP details
Goblin Hours	Released: October 24, 2019; Label: Self-released; Format: Digital download, streaming
Dancin' Times	Released: June 2, 2020; Label: Self-released; Format: Digital download, streaming
Hazards	Released: August 27, 2021; Label: Many Hats Distribution; Format: Digital download, streaming, vinyl
Girl’s Night	Released: November 3, 2023; Label: Amuseio AB; Format: Digital download, streaming
Mysteries for Rats	Released: November 17, 2023; Label: Amuseio AB; Format: Digital download, streaming
Mysteries for Rats / Girl's Night	Released: December 23, 2023; Label: Amuseio AB; Format: Vinyl

=== Singles ===
Title	Year	Peak chart positions	Certifications	Album
Title	Year	US Rock	Certifications	Album
"Rät"	2020	29	RIAA: Platinum	Public Void
"Born2Run"	2020	—		Non-album singles
"Brittle, Baby!" (with Char Chris)	2021	—		Non-album singles
"7 O'Clock"	2021	—		Hazards
"Dead Girls"	2021	—		Hazards
"Baby Take My Acid" (Lincoln featuring Penelope Scott)	2022	—		Everything is Wrong
"Gross"	2023	—		Mysteries for Rats
"Time of My Life"	2023	—		Girl's Night
"Girl's Always Right"	2025	—		Water Dogs
"Y2Kbaby"	2025	—		Fear Of God
"Loser"	2026	—		Fear Of God
"See You In Hell"	2026	—		Fear Of God

=== As Honey Morello ===
==== Studio albums ====
Title	Album details
ping	Released: July 15, 2026; Label: WDPJ; Format: Digital download, streaming

==== Singles ====
Title	Year	Album
"Halloween in July"	2026	Non-album singles
