= Jessie Gooding =

American politician

Jefferson Township Trustee
- In office November 4, 1969 – November 4, 1997
- Succeeded by: Angela Jones

President of the Dayton NAACP
- In office January 1, 1985 – December 31, 2002
- Preceded by: Richard Austin
- Succeeded by: Floyd B. Johnson

Personal details
- Born: Jessie O. Gooding; November 28, 1926 (age 99) Louisiana, U.S.
- Party: Democratic
- Spouse: Lavern Gooding
- Children: 1

Jessie Gooding (born November 28, 1926) is an American politician and member of the Democratic Party.

== Jefferson Township Trustee ==
On November 4, 1969, Jessie O. Gooding was elected as a Trustee in Jefferson Township, Montgomery County, Ohio. For part of his tenure, Gooding served as the President of the Trustees. On November 4, 1997, Gooding was defeated by Angela Jones after a 28 year tenure.

== Civil rights activism ==
Gooding had worked with Dr. Martin Luther King, Jr. in the late 1969s, and was concerned that his assassination would "upend nonviolent movement."

Gooding interviewed for inclusion in the Library of Congress National Visionary Leadership Project. He participated in the National Conference Survey of Race Relations conducted by the U.S. Commission on Civil Rights.

On December 9, 1984, Gooding defeated Tony Whitmore for the Presidency of the Dayton Chapter NAACP. He succeeded Atty. Richard Austin, who led the organization for 8 years. Gooding led the organization for 18 years, retiring on December 31, 2002. He supported Floyd B. Johnson to be his successor.

== Awards and recognition ==
Gooding has been recognized for his civil and human rights work. He was inducted into the Ohio Civil Rights Commission Hall of Fame in 2014 and the Dayton Region's Walk of Fame in 2019. Ohio state representative Willis Blackshear Jr. sponsored H.B. 671 to name portions of S.R. 35, "Jessie Gooding Highway". During the construction of the new Third St. bridge, the Montgomery County Engineer along with many community members, honored Gooding for his civil and human rights work.
