= Murder Metal =

Studio album by Macabre
- Released: September 22, 2003
- Genre: Death metal; thrash metal; grindcore
- Length: 44:05
- Label: Decomposed Records, Nuclear Blast

Macabre chronology
Dahmer (2000)	Murder Metal (2003)	Grim Scary Tales (2011)

Murder Metal is the fourth album by American extreme metal band Macabre. It was released on September 22, 2003, through Decomposed Records. The album was reissued by Nuclear Blast in 2019 through Bandcamp and in 2022 it was reissue and remastered for CD, cassette and vinyl.

== Track listing ==
1. "Acid Bath Vampire" - 3:46 - John Haigh
2. "You're Dying to Be with Me" - 2:43 - Dennis Nilsen
3. "Fatal Foot Fetish" - 2:08 Jerry Brudos
4. "The Hillside Stranglers" - 1:38 - The Hillside Stranglers
5. "Dorthea's Dead Folks Home" - 1:09 - Dorothea Puente
6. "The Iceman" - 2:44 - Richard Kuklinski
7. "Poison" - 1:16 - Graham Fredrick Young
8. "Werewolf of Bedburg" - 5:29 - Peter Stumpp
9. "Morbid Minister" - 1:28 - Gary M. Heidnik
10. "The Wustenfeld Man Eater" - 2:32 - Armin Meiwes
11. "Diary of Torture" - 2:14 - Robert Berdella
12. "Jack the Ripper" - 4:08 - Jack the Ripper
13. "Fritz Haarmann der Metzger" - 12:50 - Fritz Haarmann
14. "Jack The Stripper" - 1:14 - Hammersmith nude murders (secret track starting at 11:15 of the previous track)

== Personnel ==
- Corporate Death – guitars, vocals
- Nefarious – bass, vocals
- Dennis the Menace – drums
