= Tamara Samsonova =

Russian murderer (born 1947)

Tamara Samsonov
- Тама́ра Самсо́нова
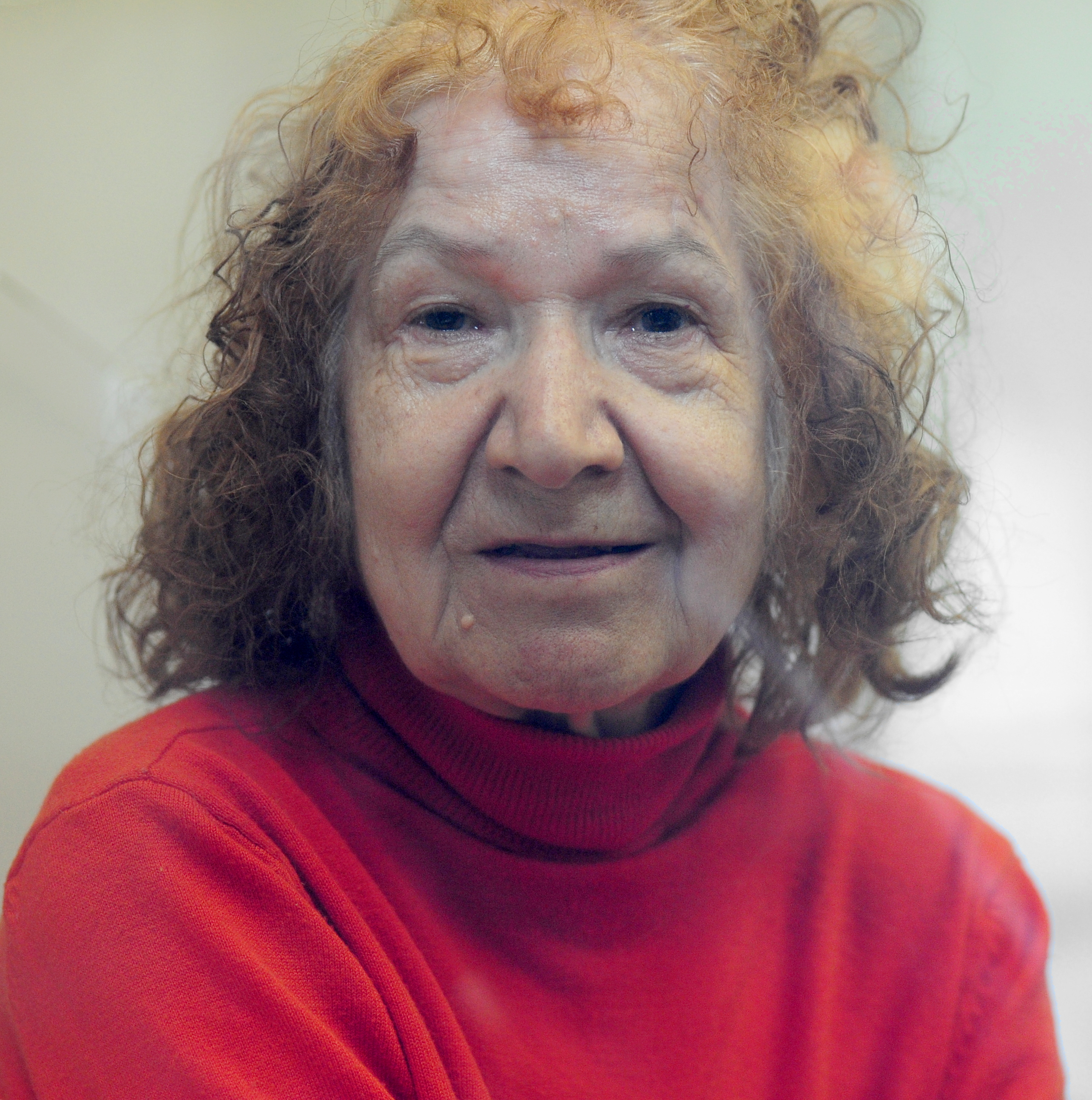
- Tamara Samsonova (29 July 2015) in the Frunze District Court of St. Petersburg.
- Born: Tamara Mitrofanovna Samsonova; 25 April 1947 (age 79); Uzhur, Krasnoyarsk Krai, RSFSR, Soviet Union
- Other names: "The Granny Ripper" "Baba Yaga"
- Education: Moscow State Linguistic University
- Spouse: Alexi Samsonov (m. 1971–2000)
- Conviction: Murder
- Capture status: Sentenced to psychiatric hospital

Details
- Victims: Known: Valentina Nikolaevna Ulanova; Sergei Potyavin; Presumed: Alexei Samsonov (husband); "Volodya" (tenant)
- Span of crimes: 2000–2015
- Country: Russia
- Location: St. Petersburg
- Killed: 2 proved (14 suspected)
- Weapons: Knife, poison
- Date apprehended: 27 July 2015

Tamara Mitrofanovna Samsonova (Russian: Тама́ра Митрофа́новна Самсо́нова; born 25 April 1947), known as Granny Ripper and Baba Yaga, is a Russian murderer and suspected serial killer who was arrested in July 2015. She has been hospitalized three times in psychiatric hospitals and may be schizophrenic.

== Biography ==
Samsonova was born on 25 April 1947, in the city of Uzhur, now part of the Krasnoyarsk Krai.

After graduating from high school, she arrived in Moscow and entered the Maurice Thorez Moscow State Pedagogical Institute of Foreign Languages. After graduating, she moved to Leningrad, where she married Alexei Samsonov. In 1971, she and her husband settled in the newly built panel house number 4 on Dimitrov Street.

For some time, she worked for Intourist travel agency, in particular, in the Grand Hotel Europe. The amount of work experience Samsonova gathered at the time of her retirement was 16 years.

In 2000, Samsonova's husband disappeared. She appealed to the police, but searches yielded nothing. Fifteen years later, in April 2015, she contacted the investigative unit of the Fruzensky District in St. Petersburg and gave a statement about her husband's disappearance.

== Murders ==
After her husband's disappearance, Samsonova rented out a room in her apartment. On 6 September 2003, during a quarrel, she killed her 44-year-old tenant, Sergei Potanin, and another male who was a 32-year-old resident from Norilsk. She dismembered his corpse and disposed of it outdoors on the Dimitrov street.

In March 2015, a mutual friend asked 79-year-old Valentina Nikolaevna Ulanova, who also lived on Dimitrov Street, to shelter Samsonova temporarily while Samsonova's apartment was being renovated. Samsonova lived in Ulanova's apartment for several months, helping with the housework. The relationship between the two deteriorated, and when Ulanova asked Samsonova to leave she refused to move out.

Samsonova travelled to Pushkin and persuaded a pharmacist to sell her the prescription drug phenazepam. She put the pills into an Olivier salad, a favourite of Ulanova's, and gave it to her.

On the night of 23 July, Samsonova found Ulanova's body lying on the kitchen floor. Samsonova dismembered the body with two knives and a saw and bagged up the pieces. She left pieces of Ulanova's body scattered about as she made several trips to take all the bags out of the apartment.

Ulanova's dismembered body, wrapped in a bathroom curtain, was found on the evening of 26 July, near a pond at house number 10 on Dimitrov Street. The package had not attracted attention for several days, until a resident took an interest in its contents.

The identity of the deceased was established on 27 July after a survey of apartment residents. When police officers knocked on Ulanova's apartment, Samsonova opened the door. Police found traces of blood in the bathroom, and the fastening from the torn-off curtain. Samsonova was arrested.

=== Investigation and compulsory treatment ===
On 29 July 2015, Samsonova was brought to the Frunze District Court of St. Petersburg. A forensic psychiatric examination determined on 26 November 2015 that she was a danger to society and to herself, and she was placed in a specialized institution until the end of the investigation.

In December 2015, Samsonova was sent for compulsory psychiatric treatment in a specialized hospital in Kazan.

She is being investigated in connection with 14 murders.

Police found a diary containing details of some of the murders. One entry claims she: "killed my tenant Volodya, cut him to pieces in the bathroom with a knife and put the pieces of his body in plastic bags and threw them away in the different parts of Frunzensky District."

== See also ==
- List of Russian serial killers
- List of serial killers by number of victims
