= Dahmer (album) =

Studio album by Macabre
- Released: January 31, 2000
- Recorded: Village Productions, Tornillo, TX, September 9–22, 1999
- Genre: Death metal; thrash metal; grindcore
- Length: 51:57
- Producer: Neil Kernon

Macabre chronology
Unabomber (1999)	Dahmer (2000)	Murder Metal (2003)

Dahmer is a concept album and third studio album by American grindcore/death metal band Macabre about Jeffrey Dahmer released in 2000. The songs comprise a biography of the life of Jeffrey Dahmer; therefore they are in chronological order.

== Track listing ==
1. "Dog Guts" – 3:15
2. "Hitchhiker" – 3:30
3. "In the Army Now" – 1:29
4. "Grandmother's House" – 2:27
5. "Blood Bank" – 2:17
6. "Exposure" – 2:15
7. "Ambassador Hotel" – 3:52
8. "How 'Bout Some Coffee" – 1:58
9. "Bath House" – 1:53
10. "Jeffrey Dahmer and the Chocolate Factory" – 1:01
11. "Apartment 213" – 2:38
12. "Drill Bit Lobotomy" – 1:39
13. "Jeffrey Dahmer Blues" – 2:28
14. "McDahmers" – 1:30
15. "Into the Toilet with You" – 1:43
16. "Coming to Chicago" – 1:36
17. "Scrub a Dub Dub" – 3:23
18. "Konerak" – 1:51
19. "Media Circus" – 0:22
20. "Temple of Bones" – 1:39
21. "Trial" – 2:04
22. "Do the Dahmer" – 1:35
23. "Baptized" – 1:31
24. "Christopher Scarver" – 2:23
25. "Dahmer's Dead" – 0:33
26. "The Brain" – 1:17

== Influences ==
Several songs take the tune of popular American songs and attach different lyrics to them:

- “When Johnny Comes Marching Home” (“In the Army Now”)
- “Over the River and Through the Wood” (“Grandmother's House”)
- “Charlie and the Chocolate Factory” (“Jeffrey Dahmer and the Chocolate Factory”)
- “She'll Be Coming 'Round the Mountain” ("Coming to Chicago")

Many of the songs also allude to aspects of American popular culture, examples being how "McDahmers" refers to the McDonald's Corporation and its use of “McWords” as well as its former slogan of being "a happy place".

== Personnel ==
Macabre

- Corporate Death - lead vocals, guitars
- Nefarious - bass, backing vocals
- Dennis The Menace - drums

Production

- Neil Kernon - production
