= Grim Reality (EP) =

EP by Macabre
- Released: 1987
- Recorded: 1986
- Genre: Death metal; thrash metal
- Length: 12:28
- Label: Decomposed Records, Vinyl Solutions

Macabre chronology
Grim Reality (1987)	Gloom (1989)

Professional ratings
Review scores
Source	Rating
AllMusic	1/5 stars

Grim Reality is an extended play by American extreme metal band Macabre. Released in 1987, it is the band's first release.

== Track listing ==
1. "Serial Killer" – 1:51 - Henry Lee Lucas and Ottis Toole
2. "Mr. Albert Fish (Was Children Your Favorite Dish?)" – 2:33 - Albert Fish
3. "Disease" – 1:37 *
4. "Mass Murder" – 5:20
  1. "Sulfuric Acid"
  2. "Morbid Curiosity"
  3. "Lethal Injection"
5. "Son of Sam" - David Berkowitz – 1:54
6. "Hot Rods to Hell" – 1:50
7. "Ed Gein" - Ed Gein – 2:55
8. "Natural Disaster" – 1:25 *

*Not on all releases

== Reception ==
In a low scoring review at AllMusic, Jason Birchmeier said "it's important to consider how ahead of their time the band was with this album, even if the music and the sound quality are a struggle at times."

== Personnel ==
- Corporate Death – guitars, vocals
- Nefarious – bass, vocals
- Dennis the Menace – drums
