= Macabre (band) =

American extreme metal band

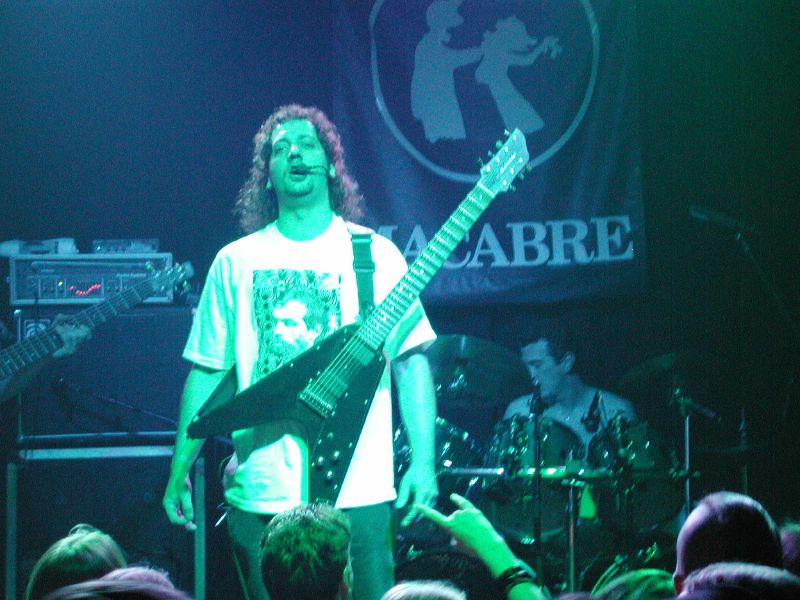
- Macabre performing in 2001

Background information
- Origin: Chicago, Illinois, U.S.
- Genres: Death metal; thrash metal; grindcore
- Years active: 1985–present
- Labels: Vinyl Solutions; Nuclear Blast; Season of Mist; Decomposed
- Members: Charles Lescewicz; Dennis Ritchie; Lance Lencioni

Macabre is an American death metal band from Chicago. The band has featured the same three members since their formation in 1985. The group blends thrash metal, death metal, and grindcore (sometimes with nursery rhymes and folk melodies). Macabre's lyrics focus on serial killers, mass murderers, and humorous elements. The group is signed to Nuclear Blast.

The band performed at Milwaukee Metal Fest in May 2023 and June 2024, and are scheduled return to the festival in 2026.

== Musical style and influences ==
Macabre was influenced by US and UK hardcore, grindcore, and death metal acts, ranging from Venom, The Accüsed, Raw Power, Suicidal Tendencies, and Cryptic Slaughter to Possessed and Napalm Death. Macabre's dark sense of humor alienated casual metal listeners but helped them gain a small following.

== Band members ==
- Nefarious (Charles Lescewicz) – bass, vocals
- Dennis the Menace (Dennis Ritchie) – drums
- Corporate Death (Lance Lencioni) – guitar, vocals

== Discography ==
=== Studio albums ===
- Gloom (1989)
- Sinister Slaughter (1993)
- Dahmer (2000)
- Murder Metal (2003)
- Grim Scary Tales (2011)
- Carnival of Killers (2020)

=== Demos, splits, and compilations ===
- Shitlist (1987)
- Grim Reality (1987)
- Shitlist (1988, 7")
- Nightstalker (1991, 7")
- Behind the Wall of Sleep (1994, EP)
- Unabomber (1999, EP)
- Capitalist Casualties / Macabre (2001, split with Capitalist Casualties)
- Morbid Campfire Songs (2002, as the Macabre Minstrels)
- Drill Bit Lobotomy (2002, 7")
- Macabre Electric & Acoustic Two CD Set (2004, 2-CD set including the CDs Murder Metal and Macabre Minstrels)
- True Tales of Slaughter and Slaying (2006, DVD)
- Grim Reality (2008) _{− re-issue featuring the remastered 1980s version and a Neil Kernon remix version}
- Human Monsters (2010, EP)
- Slaughter Thy Poser (2012, EP)
