= Lists of songs =

These are lists of songs. In music, a song is a musical composition for a voice or voices, performed by singing or alongside musical instruments. A choral or vocal song may be accompanied by musical instruments, or it may be unaccompanied, as in the case of a cappella songs. The lyrics of songs are typically of a poetic, rhyming nature, though they may be religious verses or free prose.

== By artist ==
See

- List of songs recorded by Arijit Singh
- List of songs recorded by 2PM
- List of songs recorded by 311
- List of songs recorded by 4Minute
- List of songs recorded by 911
- List of songs recorded by A-Teens
- List of songs recorded by Aaliyah
- List of songs recorded by Adele
- List of songs recorded by Aerosmith
- List of songs recorded by Ariana Grande
- List of songs recorded by Die Ärzte
- List of songs recorded by After School
- List of songs recorded by Christina Aguilera
- List of songs recorded by AKB48
- List of songs recorded by Fiona Apple
- List of songs recorded by Arch Enemy
- List of songs recorded by Arctic Monkeys
- List of songs recorded by Badlees
- List of songs recorded by Syd Barrett
- List of songs recorded by the Beach Boys
- List of songs recorded by Beady Eye
- List of songs recorded by the Beatles
- List of songs recorded by the Bee Gees
- List of songs recorded by Belinda
- Drake discography
- List of songs recorded by Drake Bell
- Lil Skies discography
- Lil Pump discography
- Katy Perry discography
- Mac Miller discography
- Kodak Black discography
- Blueface discography
- Juice Wrld discography
- List of songs recorded by Beyoncé
- List of songs recorded by Björk
- List of songs recorded by Corbin Bleu
- List of songs recorded by Blink-182
- List of songs recorded by Blur
- List of songs recorded by Bon Jovi
- List of songs recorded by Bright Eyes
- List of songs recorded by Brotherhood of Man
- List of songs recorded by Bucks Fizz
- List of songs recorded by Alexandra Burke
- List of songs recorded by Kate Bush
- List of songs recorded by Cardiacs
- List of songs recorded by Mariah Carey
- List of songs recorded by the Carpenters
- List of songs recorded by Johnny Cash
- List of songs recorded by the Cat Empire
- List of songs recorded by the Chemical Brothers
- List of songs recorded by Jay Chou
- List of songs recorded by Chrisye
- List of songs recorded by Kelly Clarkson
- List of songs recorded by the Clash
- List of songs by Coldplay
- List of songs recorded by Cheryl Cole
- List of songs recorded by Collective Soul
- List of songs recorded by Common
- List of songs recorded by Perry Como
- List of songs recorded by Harry Connick, Jr.
- List of songs recorded by Nikka Costa
- List of songs recorded by Miley Cyrus
- List of songs recorded by Dalida
- List of songs recorded by the Darkness
- List of songs recorded by A Day to Remember
- List of songs recorded by De/Vision
- List of songs recorded by Lana Del Rey
- List of songs recorded by Destiny's Child
- List of songs recorded by Dido
- List of songs recorded by Celine Dion
- List of songs recorded by DJ Quik
- List of songs recorded by Dragonette
- List of songs recorded by Dream Theater
- List of songs recorded by Electric Light Orchestra
- List of songs recorded by Elisa
- List of songs recorded by Sophie Ellis-Bextor
- List of songs recorded by Embrace
- List of songs recorded by Envy & Other Sins
- List of songs recorded by the Everly Brothers
- List of songs recorded by Exo
- List of songs recorded by f(x)
- List of songs recorded by Faith No More
- List of songs recorded by Mylène Farmer
- List of songs recorded by Sky Ferreira
- List of songs recorded by Flyleaf
- List of songs recorded by Foo Fighters
- List of songs recorded by Sergio Franchi
- List of songs recorded by Free
- List of songs recorded by Fugazi
- List of songs recorded by Zubeen Garg
- List of Genesis medleys
- List of songs recorded by Keith Getty
- List of Bengali songs recorded by Shreya Ghoshal
- List of Kannada songs recorded by Shreya Ghoshal
- List of Malayalam songs recorded by Shreya Ghoshal
- List of songs recorded by Shreya Ghoshal
- List of Tamil songs recorded by Shreya Ghoshal
- List of Telugu songs recorded by Shreya Ghoshal
- List of songs recorded by Ghost
- List of songs recorded by Girls Aloud
- List of songs recorded by Girls' Generation
- List of songs recorded by Goldfrapp
- List of songs recorded by Ellie Goulding
- List of songs recorded by Green Day
- List of songs recorded by Guillemots
- List of songs recorded by Guns N' Roses
- List of songs recorded by Hadouken!
- Emmylou Harris appearances
- Emmylou Harris collaborations A–F
- Emmylou Harris collaborations G–K
- Emmylou Harris collaborations L–Q
- Emmylou Harris collaborations R–Z
- List of songs recorded by George Harrison
- List of Hillsong songs
- List of songs recorded by Hollywood Undead
- List of songs recorded by Whitney Houston
- List of songs recorded by Iron Maiden
- List of songs recorded by J.B.O.
- List of songs recorded by the Jackson 5
- List of songs recorded by Michael Jackson
- List of songs recorded by Jay-Z
- List of songs recorded by Blind Willie Johnson
- List of songs recorded by JoJo
- List of songs recorded by Jonas Brothers
- List of songs recorded by Ada Jones
- List of songs recorded by Joy Division
- List of songs recorded by Junoon
- List of songs recorded by JYJ
- List of songs recorded by Kara
- List of songs recorded by Kasabian
- List of songs recorded by Keane
- List of songs recorded by Kent
- List of songs recorded by Alicia Keys
- List of songs recorded by Morgana King
- List of songs recorded by Kings of Leon
- List of songs recorded by Kavita Krishnamurthy
- List of Songs recorded by Kavita Krishnamurthy in South-Indian languages
- List of songs recorded by Kishore Kumar
- List of songs recorded by Talib Kweli
- List of songs recorded by Lady Gaga
- List of songs recorded by Cyndi Lauper
- List of songs written and performed by Avril Lavigne
- List of songs recorded by Lead Belly
- List of songs recorded by Huey Lewis and the News
- List of songs recorded by Leona Lewis
- List of songs recorded by Liberty X
- List of songs recorded by Linkin Park
- List of songs recorded by Led Zeppelin
- List of songs recorded by Jennifer Lopez
- List of songs recorded by Lorde
- List of songs recorded by Lostprophets
- List of songs recorded by Mike Love
- List of songs recorded by Mallu Magalhães
- List of songs recorded by Magnapop
- List of songs recorded by Marina and the Diamonds
- List of songs recorded by Maroon 5
- List of songs recorded by Bruno Mars
- List of songs recorded by Mireille Mathieu
- List of songs recorded by Mayday Parade
- List of Paul McCartney maxi-singles
- List of songs recorded by McFly
- List of songs recorded by Memphis Minnie
- List of songs recorded by mewithoutYou
- List of songs recorded by Kylie Minogue
- List of songs recorded by Nimal Mendis
- List of songs recorded by MGMT
- List of songs recorded by Milva
- List of songs recorded by Mina
- List of songs recorded by Nicki Minaj
- List of songs recorded by Minor Threat
- List of songs recorded by Mischief Brew
- List of songs recorded by the Misfits
- List of songs recorded by Mizraab
- List of songs recorded by Modern Talking
- List of songs recorded by Monica
- List of songs recorded by Mos Def
- List of songs recorded by Mumford & Sons
- List of songs recorded by Muse
- List of songs recorded by My Bloody Valentine
- List of songs recorded by My Chemical Romance
- List of songs recorded by Mýa
- List of songs recorded by Nadia Ali
- List of songs recorded by Udit Narayan
- List of songs recorded by the Narrative
- List of songs recorded by Natalia Kills
- List of songs recorded by Newsboys
- List of songs recorded by Jason Newsted
- List of songs recorded by Nickelback
- List of songs recorded by Nightwish
- List of songs recorded by Nirvana
- List of songs recorded by No Angels
- List of songs recorded by Noisettes
- List of songs recorded by Brandy Norwood
- List of songs recorded by Oasis
- List of songs recorded by Phil Ochs
- List of songs recorded by the Offspring
- List of songs recorded by Oh Land
- List of songs recorded by One Direction
- List of songs recorded by Patti Page
- List of songs recorded by Paramore
- List of songs recorded by Anuradha Paudwal
- List of songs recorded by Katy Perry
- List of songs recorded by Pet Shop Boys
- List of songs recorded by Washington Phillips
- List of songs recorded by Phish
- List of songs recorded by Pink Floyd
- List of songs recorded by Pink Martini
- List of songs recorded by Pixies
- List of songs recorded by Plan B
- List of songs recorded by the Pogues
- List of songs recorded by Elvis Presley
- List of Elvis Presley hit singles
- List of Elvis Presley international hit singles
- List of songs recorded by Elvis Presley on the Sun label
- List of songs recorded by Puddle of Mudd
- List of songs recorded by the Pussycat Dolls
- List of songs recorded by Queen
- List of songs recorded by Radiohead
- List of songs recorded by Mohammed Rafi
- List of songs recorded by Mohammed Rafi (A)
- List of songs recorded by Mohammed Rafi (B–C)
- List of songs recorded by Mohammed Rafi (D–F)
- List of songs recorded by Mohammed Rafi (G)
- List of songs recorded by Mohammed Rafi (H–I)
- List of songs recorded by Mohammed Rafi (J)
- List of songs recorded by Mohammed Rafi (K)
- List of songs recorded by Mohammed Rafi (L)
- List of songs recorded by Mohammed Rafi (M)
- List of songs recorded by Mohammed Rafi (N)
- List of songs recorded by Mohammed Rafi (O)
- List of songs recorded by Mohammed Rafi (P–R)
- List of songs recorded by Mohammed Rafi (S)
- List of songs recorded by Mohammed Rafi (T)
- List of songs recorded by Mohammed Rafi (U–Z)
- List of songs recorded by Rainbow (South Korean band)
- List of songs recorded by Raven-Symoné
- List of songs recorded by Red Hot Chili Peppers
- List of songs recorded by Blind Joe Reynolds
- List of songs recorded by Damien Rice
- List of songs recorded by Rihanna
- List of songs recorded by Rise Against
- List of songs recorded by Kelly Rowland
- List of songs recorded by Roxette
- List of songs recorded by Rush
- List of songs recorded by Saint Etienne
- List of songs recorded by Kumar Sanu
- List of songs recorded by the Saturdays
- List of songs recorded by Jack Savoretti
- List of songs recorded by Nicole Scherzinger
- List of songs recorded by Scissor Sisters
- List of songs recorded by Secret
- List of songs recorded by the Seekers
- List of songs recorded by Selena
- List of songs recorded by Selena Gomez & the Scene
- List of songs recorded by Shakira
- List of songs recorded by Ringo Sheena
- List of songs recorded by Shinee
- List of songs recorded by Sia
- List of songs recorded by Simon & Garfunkel
- List of songs recorded by Frank Sinatra
- List of songs recorded by Sinn Sisamouth
- List of songs recorded by Sissel Kyrkjebø
- List of songs recorded by Sistar
- List of songs recorded by Slade
- List of songs recorded by Slipknot
- List of songs recorded by Sy Smith
- List of songs recorded by the Smiths
- List of songs recorded by Regina Spektor
- List of songs recorded by Stateless
- List of songs recorded by Status Quo
- List of songs recorded by Stereophonics
- List of songs recorded by Rachel Stevens
- List of songs recorded by the Stone Roses
- List of songs recorded by Tinchy Stryder
- List of songs recorded by Sugababes
- List of songs recorded by Supertramp
- List of songs recorded by Skye Sweetnam
- List of songs recorded by Taylor Swift
- List of songs recorded by the Sword
- List of songs recorded by T-ara
- List of songs recorded by Take That
- List of songs recorded by Therapy?
- List of songs recorded by Thirty Seconds to Mars
- List of songs recorded by Justin Timberlake
- List of songs recorded by Ashley Tisdale
- List of songs recorded by Tokio Hotel
- List of songs recorded by Tokyo Jihen
- List of songs recorded by Travis
- List of songs recorded by Oliver Tree
- List of songs recorded by TVXQ
- List of songs recorded by U2
- List of songs recorded by Usher
- List of songs recorded by Carrie Underwood
- List of songs recorded by Steve Vai
- List of songs recorded by the Velvet Underground
- List of songs recorded by Julieta Venegas
- List of songs recorded by Rufus Wainwright
- List of songs recorded by Kanye West
- List of songs recorded by Westlife
- List of songs recorded by the White Stripes
- List of songs recorded by the Who
- List of songs recorded by the Wiggles
- List of songs recorded by Robbie Williams
- List of songs recorded by Brian Wilson
- List of songs recorded by Carl Wilson
- List of songs recorded by Dennis Wilson
- List of songs recorded by Wolf Alice
- List of songs recorded by Wolfmother
- List of songs recorded by Alka Yagnik
- List of songs recorded by "Weird Al" Yankovic
- List of songs recorded by ZOEgirl

== Cover songs ==
- List of cover versions of Jacques Brel songs
- List of songs covered by the Beatles
- List of cover versions of the Beatles songs
- List of cover versions of Black Sabbath songs
- List of Czech cover versions of songs
- List of cover versions of Depeche Mode songs
- List of artists who have covered Bob Dylan songs
- List of Grateful Dead cover versions
- List of cover versions of Michael Jackson songs
- List of cover versions of Led Zeppelin songs
- List of cover versions of The Miracles songs
- List of Live Lounge cover versions
- List of cover versions of Misfits songs
- List of artists who have covered Van Morrison songs
- List of S.H.E covers and parodies
- List of Phish cover versions
- List of cover versions of U2 songs
- List of Westlife covers

== By dance ==
- List of twist songs

== Film ==
- List of songs based on a film
- List of songs featured in Shrek

== By genre ==
- Christmas music
- List of calypso songs about cricket
- List of calypso songs about war
- List of Eurodance songs
- List of Hi-NRG artists and songs
- The History of Rock and Roll contents
- List of Italo disco artists and songs
- List of jazz standards
- List of Latin freestyle musicians and songs
- List of mashup songs
- List of murder ballads
- List of post-disco artists and songs
- List of power pop artists and songs
- List of quiet storm songs
- List of rock instrumentals
- List of soft rock artists and songs
- List of songs based on poems
- List of UK garage songs

== By geography ==
=== Countries ===
- List of number-one songs in Norway

==== Patriotic songs ====
- Armenian revolutionary songs
- List of Bangladeshi patriotic songs
- List of Bosnia and Herzegovina patriotic songs
- List of anthems of non-sovereign countries, regions and territories
- List of England football team songs
- List of historical national anthems
- List of national anthems
- List of Singaporean patriotic songs

==== Anthems ====
- List of historical national anthems
- List of anthems of non-sovereign countries, regions and territories
- List of anthems of Venezuela
- List of national anthems
- Anthems of the autonomous communities of Spain
- List of U.S. state songs

=== Cities ===
- List of songs about cities
- List of songs about Amsterdam
- List of songs about Berlin
- List of songs about Copenhagen
- List of songs about Hamburg
- List of songs about Jerusalem
- List of songs about Manila
- List of songs about Moscow
- List of songs about Paris
- List of songs about Stockholm
- List of songs about Tokyo

==== Australian cities ====
- List of songs about Melbourne
- List of songs about Sydney

==== Canadian cities ====
- List of songs about Montreal
- List of songs about Toronto
- List of songs about Vancouver

==== English cities ====
- List of songs about Birmingham
- List of songs about Liverpool
- List of songs about London
- List of songs about London (L)
- List of songs about Manchester

==== Indian cities ====
- List of songs about Delhi
- List of songs about Kolkata
- List of songs about Mumbai

==== Irish cities ====
- List of songs about Dublin

==== U.S. cities ====
- List of songs about Atlanta
- List of songs about Birmingham, Alabama
- List of songs about Boston
- List of songs about Chicago
- List of songs about Detroit
- List of songs about Miami
- List of songs about Nashville
- List of songs about New Orleans
- List of songs about New York City
- List of songs about Portland, Oregon
- List of songs about Seattle

=== States and provinces ===
- List of songs about Alabama
- List of Newfoundland songs
- List of songs about Ohio
- List of songs about Oklahoma

== By producer ==
- List of songs produced by Dallas Austin
- List of songs produced by Eminem
- List of songs produced by Ester Dean
- List of songs produced by Jam and Lewis
- List of songs written and produced by James Blake
- List of songs produced by Jeff Lynne
- List of songs written and produced by Nick Jonas
- List of songs written or produced by Naughty Boy
- List of songs written and produced by R. Kelly
- List of songs produced by Rico Love
- List of songs produced by Scott Storch
- List of songs written and produced by Soyeon
- List of songs produced by Stock Aitken Waterman
- List of songs produced by Suga

== Rated ==
- 1974 NME Critics End of Year Poll
- Rolling Stone's 500 Greatest Songs of All Time
- AFI's 100 Years...100 Songs
- B92 Top 100 Domestic Songs
- Songs of the Century
- Festive Fifty
- 50 Tracks
- 50 Tracks: The Canadian Version
- The Pitchfork 500
- Rock Express Top 100 Yugoslav Rock Songs of All Times
- Top 2000
- List of music considered the worst

== By session musician ==
- List of recordings of songs Hal Blaine has played on
- List of recordings of songs Earl Palmer has played on

== By songwriters ==
See

- Discography of Audie Murphy
- List of Irving Berlin songs (chronological)
- List of songs and arias of Johann Sebastian Bach
- List of songs composed by Franz Schubert
- List of songs composed by Jerome Kern
- List of songs written by Alicia Keys
- List of songs written by Ashford & Simpson
- List of songs written by Audie Murphy
- List of songs written by B.I
- List of songs written by Babyface
- List of songs written by Barry Mann and Cynthia Weil
- List of songs written by Bernie Taupin
- List of songs written by Berry Gordy
- List of songs written by Bob Crewe
- List of songs written by Bob Dylan
- List of songs written by Bonnie McKee
- List of songs written by Brett James
- List of songs written by Bruno Mars
- List of songs written by Burt Bacharach
- List of songs written by Cathy Dennis
- List of songs written by Cole Porter
- List of songs written by Craig Wiseman
- List of songs written by David Foster
- List of songs written by David Lee Murphy
- List of songs written by Dennis Linde
- List of songs written by Desmond Child
- List of songs written by Diane Warren
- List of songs written by Doc Pomus and Mort Shuman
- List of songs written by Dottie Rambo
- List of songs written by Emeli Sandé
- List of songs written by Frank J. Myers
- List of songs written by Frank Ocean
- List of songs written by G-Dragon
- List of songs written by Gary Barlow
- List of songs written by Goffin and King
- List of songs written by Gregg Alexander
- List of songs written by Hank Williams
- List of songs written by Holland, Dozier and Holland
- List of songs written by Hyuna
- List of songs written by Irving Berlin
- List of songs written by Isaac Hayes and David Porter
- List of songs written by Jack Keller
- List of songs written by Jeff Barry and Ellie Greenwich
- List of songs written by Jeffrey Steele
- List of songs written by Jerry Leiber and Mike Stoller
- List of songs written by Jimmy Jam and Terry Lewis
- List of songs written by John Rich
- List of songs written by Kenny Gamble and Leon Huff
- List of songs written by Kenzie
- List of songs written by Kim Hee-chul
- List of songs written by Kim Jong-hyun
- List of songs written by Kostas
- List of songs written by L.A. Reid (1983–1993)
- List of songs written by Lee Donghae
- List of songs written by Lynsey de Paul
- List of songs written by Natasha Bedingfield
- List of songs written by Norman Whitfield
- List of songs written by P. G. Wodehouse
- List of songs written by Paul Simon
- List of songs written by Pebe Sebert
- List of songs written by Phil Vassar
- List of songs written by Ravi
- List of songs written by Roger Cook and Roger Greenaway
- List of songs written by Shane McAnally
- List of songs written by Smokey Robinson
- List of songs written by Stephen Foster
- List of songs written by Super Junior
- List of songs written by Taecyeon
- List of songs written by Tove Lo
- List of songs written by Walter Afanasieff
- List of songs written by Willie Dixon
- List of songs written by Willie Nelson

== Television shows ==
- List of Britannia High songs
- List of Hannah Montana songs
- List of songs from Sesame Street
- List of songs in Smash
- List of songs in Victorious
- List of television theme music

=== Glee ===
- List of songs in Glee (season 1)
- List of songs in Glee (season 2)
- List of songs in Glee (season 3)
- List of songs in Glee (season 4)
- List of songs in Glee (season 5)

=== By reality television contestants ===
- List of American Idol Hot 100 singles
- Australian Idol discography
- Fame Academy discography
- Pop Idol discography
- Popstars (UK) discography
- The Voice (Australia) discography
- The Voice (U.S. TV series) discography
- The Voice UK discography
- The X Factor (Australia) discography
- The X Factor (U.S.) discography
- The X Factor (UK) discography

=== Eurovision ===
- List of Eurovision Song Contest entries (1956–2003)
- List of Eurovision Song Contest entries (2004–present)
- List of Junior Eurovision Song Contest entries

== Topical ==
- List of songs about abortion
- List of anti-war songs
- List of songs about bicycles
- List of birthday songs
- List of songs about child abuse
- List of songs about close encounters with aliens
- List of songs about the Cold War
- List of songs about death
- List of charity songs for Hurricane Katrina relief
- List of insect-inspired songs
- List of songs about Louth
- List of songs about school
- List of songs about the September 11 attacks
- List of songs about or referencing to serial killers
- List of songs about Tipperary
- List of train songs
- List of songs about the Vietnam War
- List of songs about Wicklow
- Role of music in World War II

== By music type ==
- List of patter songs
- List of songs containing the 50s progression
- List of songs which use the Jew's harp

== Unreleased songs ==
See

- List of unreleased songs recorded by ABBA
- List of unreleased songs recorded by Britney Spears
- List of unreleased songs recorded by Lana Del Rey
- List of unreleased songs recorded by Madonna
- List of unreleased songs recorded by Michael Jackson
- List of unreleased songs recorded by Pink Floyd
- List of unreleased songs recorded by R. Kelly
- List of unreleased songs recorded by the Beach Boys

== Video games ==
- List of downloadable songs for Rocksmith
- List of Dance Praise songs
- List of Guitar Praise songs
- List of Pump It Up songs

=== Guitar Hero ===
- List of songs in Guitar Hero
- List of songs in Guitar Hero II
- List of songs in Guitar Hero III: Legends of Rock
- List of songs in Guitar Hero World Tour
- List of songs in Guitar Hero 5
- List of songs in Guitar Hero: Warriors of Rock
- List of songs in Guitar Hero Live
- List of songs in Guitar Hero: Aerosmith
- List of songs in Guitar Hero: Metallica
- List of songs in Guitar Hero: Van Halen
- List of songs in Guitar Hero Encore: Rocks the 80s
- List of songs in the Guitar Hero: On Tour series
- List of songs in DJ Hero
- List of songs in DJ Hero 2

=== Music video game soundtracks ===
- List of DJMax soundtracks
- List of songs in The Idolmaster video games
- List of Karaoke Revolution songs
- List of downloadable songs for the Lips series
- List of songs in Lips
- List of songs in Lips: Canta en Español
- List of songs in Lips: Number One Hits
- List of Para Para Paradise songs

==== Dance Dance Revolution soundtracks ====
- Music of Dance Dance Revolution (1998 video game)
- Music of Dance Dance Revolution 2ndMix
- Music of Dance Dance Revolution (2009 video games)
- Music of Dance Dance Revolution Extreme
- Dance Dance Revolution Extreme 2 Limited Edition Music Sampler
- Dance Dance Revolution Extreme Limited Edition Music Sampler
- Dance Dance Revolution Ultramix 2 Limited Edition Music Sampler
- Music of Dance Dance Revolution X

==== Rock Band soundtracks ====
- List of songs in Rock Band
- List of songs in Rock Band 2
- List of songs in Rock Band 3
- List of songs in Rock Band 4
- List of songs in Rock Band Blitz
- List of songs in Rock Band Unplugged
- List of songs in The Beatles: Rock Band
- List of songs in Green Day: Rock Band
- List of songs in Lego Rock Band
- List of downloadable songs for the Rock Band series
- 2007 in downloadable songs for the Rock Band series
- 2008 in downloadable songs for the Rock Band series
- 2009 in downloadable songs for the Rock Band series
- 2010 in downloadable songs for the Rock Band series
- 2011 in downloadable songs for the Rock Band series
- 2012 in downloadable songs for the Rock Band series
- 2013 in downloadable songs for the Rock Band series
- 2015 in downloadable songs for the Rock Band series
- 2016 in downloadable songs for the Rock Band series
- 2017 in downloadable songs for the Rock Band series
- 2018 in downloadable songs for the Rock Band series
- 2019 in downloadable songs for the Rock Band series
- 2020 in downloadable songs for the Rock Band series
- List of Rock Band Network songs
- List of Rock Band Network 1.0 songs
- List of Rock Band Network 2.0 songs
- List of Rock Band track packs

==== SingStar ====
- List of downloadable songs for the SingStar series
- List of downloadable songpacks for the SingStar series
- List of downloadable songs for the SingStar series
- List of songs in SingStar games (PlayStation 2)
- List of songs in SingStar games (PlayStation 3)

== Miscellaneous/unsorted ==
- 1000 Years of Popular Music
- Clear Channel memorandum
- Charity record
- List of first music videos aired on MTV
- John Lennon's jukebox
- List of 2000s one-hit wonders in the United States
- List of 2010s one-hit wonders in the United States
- List of Basement Tapes songs (1975)
- List of Basement Tapes songs
- List of blackface minstrel songs
- List of Bob Dylan songs based on earlier tunes
- List of carols at the Nine Lessons and Carols, King's College Chapel
- List of charity songs for Hurricane Katrina relief
- List of Cornell University songs
- List of Don Omar collaborations
- List of diss tracks
- List of folk songs by Roud number
- List of Haruhi Suzumiya character song singles
- List of interpolated songs
- List of Jean-Michel Jarre compositions with multiple titles
- List of musical works in unusual time signatures
- List of musical works released in a stem format
- List of songs recorded by Westlife
- List of political party songs
- List of popular music songs featuring Andalusian cadences
- List of Runrig's Gaelic songs
- List of silent musical compositions
- List of songs which have spent the most weeks on the UK Singles Chart
- List of songs banned by the BBC
- List of songs containing the I-V-vi-IV progression
- List of Negima songs
- List of songs introduced by Frank Sinatra
- List of songs recorded by Zecchino d'Oro
- List of songs that retell a work of literature
- List of songs with Latin lyrics
- List of songs written and produced by Chris Braide
- List of tributes to Hank Williams
- List of tributes to Marvin Gaye
- List of UK hit singles by footballers
- List of Wisin & Yandel collaborations
- Nonsense song
- Pazz & Jop
- Peelennium

== See also ==
- Lists of albums (article)
- Lists of albums (category)
- List of lists
- List song
- Novelty song
- Outline of music
- Sporting song
