= List of songs recorded by Carl Wilson =

This list is an attempt to document every song recorded and released under the name of Carl Wilson, whether on an album, single, compilation or anthology album.

Song	Written By	Recorded	Album	Time	Producer
Bright Lights	Carl Wilson; Myrna Smith	???	Carl Wilson (1981)	3:47	James William Guercio
Feel Flows	Carl Wilson; Jack Rieley	1971	Surf's Up (1971)	4:44	The Beach Boys
Givin' You Up	Carl Wilson; Myrna Smith; Jerry Schilling	January 18 & February 1, 1982	Youngblood (1983)	4:41	Jeff Baxter
The Grammy	Carl Wilson; Myrna Smith	???	Carl Wilson (1981)	3:04	James William Guercio
Heaven	Carl Wilson; Myrna Smith; Michael Sun	???	Carl Wilson (1981)	4:23	James William Guercio
Hold Me	Carl Wilson; Myrna Smith	???	Carl Wilson (1981)	4:03	James William Guercio
Hurry Love	Carl Wilson; Myrna Smith	???	Carl Wilson (1981)	4:44	James William Guercio
If I Could Talk To Love	Carl Wilson; Myrna Smith	February 3, 1982	Youngblood (1983)	4:10	Jeff Baxter
Long Promised Road	Carl Wilson; Jack Rieley	1971	Surf's Up (1971)	3:28	The Beach Boys
Of The Times	Carl Wilson; Myrna Smith	January 19, 1982	Youngblood (1983)	4:07	Jeff Baxter
One More Night Alone	Billy Hinsche	February 3 & March 11, 1982	Youngblood (1983)	3:05	Jeff Baxter
The Right Lane	Carl Wilson; Myrna Smith	???	Carl Wilson (1981)	5:13	James William Guercio
Rockin' All Over the World	John Fogerty	February 2, 1982	Youngblood (1981)	3:00	Jeff Baxter
Seems So Long Ago	Carl Wilson; Myrna Smith	???	Carl Wilson (1981)	4:56	James William Guercio
She's Mine	Carl Wilson; Myrna Smith	January 29 & February 19, 1982	Youngblood (1983)	3:04	Jeff Baxter
This Is Elvis	Carl Wilson; Myrna Smith	???	This Is Elvis - Single (2015)	4:12	
Time	Carl Wilson; Myrna Smith	January 15 & 27, 1982	Youngblood (1983)	3:00	Jeff Baxter
Too Early To Tell	Carl Wilson; Myrna Smith; John Daly	February 1, 1982	Youngblood (1983)	2:51	Jeff Baxter
What More Can I Say	Carl Wilson; Myrna Smith	January 18, 1982	Youngblood (1983)	3:26	Jeff Baxter
What You Do To Me	John Hall; Johanna Hall	July 14 & 21, 1982	Youngblood (1983)	3:56	Jeff Baxter
What You Gonna Do About Me?	Carl Wilson; Myrna Smith	???	Carl Wilson (1981)	4:25	James William Guercio
Young Blood	Jerry Leiber; Mike Stoller; Doc Pomus	February 2, 19, & March 17, 1982	Youngblood (1983)	2:42	Jeff Baxter
