= List of songs recorded by Mike Love =

This list is an attempt to document every song recorded and released under the name of Mike Love, whether on an album, single, compilation or anthology album.

Song	Written by	Recorded	Album	Time	Producer
"Be My Baby"	Phil Spector; Jeff Barry; Ellie Greenwich	July 1980	Looking Back with Love (1981)	2:39	Curt Boettcher with Brian Wilson (uncredited)
"Calendar Girl"	Neil Sedaka; H. Greenfield	June–September 1981	Looking Back with Love (1981)	3:16	Curt Boettcher
"Cool Head, Warm Heart"	Mike Love	???	Songs from Here & Back (2006)	3:15	Paul Fauerso
"Hungry Heart"	Bruce Springsteen	???	Tribute to Bruce Springsteen: Made in the U.S.A. (2001)	3:17	???
"Looking Back with Love"	J. Studer; C. Thomas; D. Parker	June–September 1981	Looking Back with Love (1981)	3:38	Jim Studer with Curt Boettcher
"On and On and On"	Benny Andersson; Björn Ulvaeus	June–September 1981	Looking Back with Love (1981)	3:02	Curt Boettcher
"One Good Reason"	J. Studer; M. Brady	June–September 1981	Looking Back with Love (1981)	4:08	Curt Boettcher
"Over and Over"	Robert James Byrd	June–September 1981	Looking Back with Love (1981)	2:16	Curt Boettcher
"Paradise Found"	Mike Love; J. Studer	June–September 1981	Looking Back with Love (1981)	3:51	Curt Boettcher
"Rockin' the Man in the Boat"	J. Studer; J. Arnold; M. Brady	June–September 1981	Looking Back with Love (1981)	3:20	Curt Boettcher
"Runnin' Around the World"	J. Haymer; B. Aaronson	June–September 1981	Looking Back with Love (1981)	2:48	Curt Boettcher
"Teach Me Tonight"	Gene de Paul; Sammy Cahn	June–September 1981	Looking Back with Love (1981)	3:28	Curt Boettcher
Unleash the Love	Mike Love	2018	Unleash the Love	3:46	Michael Lloyd
