= List of charity songs for Hurricane Katrina relief =

Numerous musicians have recorded tribute songs to raise money for Hurricane Katrina survivors, and there are numerous more songs inspired by the event and its aftermath. Twenty-nine "remarkable works" spurred by Katrina have been noted by one source; there are others. The top 5 rap songs on the topic have been identified, in particular. By 2009, four years after Katrina, at least 40 songs were noted.

These songs and artists include:

- New Orleans-The Storm (About Katrina) – Song By Redwane and Boubker
- New Orleans-The Aftermath (About Katrina) – Song By Redwane and Boubker
- "Where Were You" by Jackson Browne
- "Flowers (this too will pass)" by The Dream Fighters, a song about what it was like to be a child in New Orleans when the levees broke.
- "Crescent City Snow" by Susan Cowsill
- "Get U Down" by Warren G featuring Snoop Dogg, Ice Cube and B-Real.
- "In The Night (I Can See)" – by Gregg Cobarr – http://www.cobarr.com/katrina
- "The Katrina Song" – Upbeat Love Song [2:11] by Subject to Change https://web.archive.org/web/20070929202033/http://www.pioneerindex.com/the_katrina_song
- "Mad Beaver Stump Grinding" by Amanda Lynn
- "All Hands Together" by Mika Nakashima
- "Home" and "The Avenue" by Cowboy Mouth
- "S.S.T." and "Brand New Orleans" single by Prince (artist)
- "Cry Out To Jesus" by Third Day. (Third Day has donated over $100,000 to the Gulf Coast Relief Fund, partially on a per-sale basis for the song.)
- Marc Broussard has released a 5-song live tribute album.
- Sheryl Crow Love is Free
- "I Hope" by the Dixie Chicks
- "Rockin Ralph's Roadhouse", a concept album and musical by Boston-based cajun/zydeco group the Squeezebox Stompers, is about regulars of a nightclub near New Orleans during and just after the hurricane.
- Xfactor- Help for Heros. (charity song)
- "Any Other Day" by Norah Jones and Wyclef Jean
- "Washed Away" by Kokomo Joe
- "Shelter In The Rain" by Stevie Wonder
- "Hold Out A Hand" by Edwin McCain
- "From The Bottom of My Heart" by Michael Jackson and All Stars
- "Valentine" by The Delays (Actually this was written about Hurricane Ivan in September, 2004)
- "Get Your Hustle On" by Juvenile
- "Black Rain" by Ben Harper
- "Resilient" by Teena Marie and her daughter Alia Rose
- "Mother Nature" by Papoose & Razah
- "Slabbed" by Jeffery Williams (a survivor's perspective)
- "Pontchartrain" by Vienna Teng
- "The Saints Are Coming" by Green Day and U2 Benefit for musicians who lost their instruments
- "In the Sun" by Michael Stipe and Chris Martin
- "Home" by Michael Bublé (This song was not originally written for Hurricane Katrina, however, it was played on the radio along with quotes from locals in the area, Bush, and the Mayor.
- "Louisiana" by Hank Waite
- "Breathe In, Breathe Out, Move On" by Jimmy Buffett
- "The Little Things Give You Away" by Linkin Park
- "Home Sweet Home" by Mötley Crüe featuring Linkin Park's lead singer Chester Bennington
- "Still New Orleans" by Bastian Foerstner (Kiel, Germany) Still New Orleans
- "Beneath The Tides" and "On March The Saints" by Down (From Over The Under)
- "From the Eye of the Storm" by Ayatey Shabazz (this song is actually written for concert band and describes the wide range of events and emotions while the composer endured the hurricane)http://www.barnhouse.com/product.php?id=012-3522-00
- "O Katrina!" - The Black Lips

== List of Songs Criticizing Response to Katrina ==
The following songs criticized the Bush Administration and/or FEMA's slow response to Hurricane Katrina:

- 12/26 by Kimya Dawson (the lyrics to this song specifically reference the 2004 tsunami and 2006 earthquake on 12/26, not Katrina)
- "The Flood" from "Boundary County" by Eilen Jewell
- "Knockin on My Trailer Door" by Weathered – http://www.BestCoverBand.com
- "Gov Did Nothin'" by John Butler Trio
- "Magnolia Soul" by Ozomatli
- "George Bush Doesn't Care About Black People" (also known as "George Bush Doesn't Like Black People") by The Legendary K.O.
- "Wide Awake" by Audioslave
- "Midnight in the City of Destruction" by The Nightwatchman
- "The Long Black Line" by New Orleans–based bluesman Spencer Bohren
- "The Big Easy Ain't Easy No More" by blues harp player Mark Hummel
- "Hell No, We Ain't Alright" by Public Enemy
- "Hurricane Song" by Allen Watty
- "Minority Report" by Jay-Z featuring Ne-Yo, produced by Dr. Dre. Though government authorities are criticized in the song, the artists place blame on themselves as well.
- "Georgia... Bush" by Lil Wayne. The track was recorded on the beat to Ludacris' single "Georgia" which sampled the Ray Charles track "Georgia On My Mind".
- "Dry Drunk Emperor" by TV on the Radio
- "Dollar Day" by Mos Def. The song criticizes the government's response to Hurricane Katrina, the Iraq War, Bono, U2 and calls for a new president.
- "Cry For Us" by Big Sty.
- "Day No One Needed to Know" by Moneen
- "New Orleans" by David Rovics
- "R.I.P New Orleans" by Meriwether
- "Katrina" by Anders Osbourne
- "Madman's Dream" by Assemblage 23
- "That's Life" by Killer Mike (criticizing Katrina's response with vitriol, as well as a myriad of other issues concerning the poor and/or black communities)
- "Voodoo Mouth" by Alamantra
- "Hurricane Katrina (The Ghosts of New Orleans)" by Frances Donnelly
- "The Little Things Give You Away" by Linkin Park
- "Rain" by Institution
- "All These People" by Harry Connick, Jr.
- "Washed Away " by Kokomo Joe
- "How Can a Poor Man Stand Such Times and Live?" by Bruce Springsteen
- "Where Were You?" by Jackson Browne
- "Tie My Hands" by Lil Wayne
- "Flooded" By Behind Enemy Lines
- "Houston" by R.E.M.
- "Red Letter Year" by Ani Difranco
- "Help is on the Way" by Rise Against
- "Louisiana Sky" by The John Popper Project
- "Houston" by Mary Chapin Carpenter
- "Katrina" by Ed Johnson & Novo Tempo
