= Thomas, Washington =

Ghost town in Washington (state)

- Ghost town
- Location within Washington (state) Location within the United States
- Coordinates: 47°21′14″N 122°13′45″W
- Country: United States
- State: Washington
- County: King
- Time zone: UTC-8 (Pacific (PST))
  - Summer (DST): UTC-7 (PDT)

Thomas is a ghost town in King County, Washington. It is situated on the left bank of the Green River, and is north of Auburn. At one time, it had a post office and a school. A fort of the United States Army was built in the community in 1855, with logs transported from Fort Steilacoom.

The community was named after John Micheltree Thomas, a local resident who came from Kentucky.

== Notable people ==
- Yoshio Kobuki (1918–1977), jockey
