= 2007 in downloadable songs for the Rock Band series =

- Songs released: 32
- Packs released: 6
- Albums released: 0

The Rock Band series of music video games supports downloadable songs for the Xbox 360, PlayStation 3, and Wii versions through the consoles' respective online services. Users can download songs on a track-by-track basis, with many of the tracks also offered as part of a "song pack" or complete album at a discounted rate. These packs are available for the Wii only on Rock Band 3. Most downloadable songs are playable within every game mode, including the Band World Tour career mode. All downloadable songs released before October 26, 2010 are cross-compatible between Rock Band, Rock Band 2 and Rock Band 3, while those after only work with Rock Band 3. Certain songs deemed "suitable for all ages" by Harmonix are also available for use in Lego Rock Band.

The Wii version of Rock Band does not support downloadable content, but Rock Band 2 and Rock Band 3 do, with DLC first made available in January 2009. Songs from the back catalogue of downloadable content were released for the Wii weekly in an effort by Harmonix to provide Wii players with every previously available song.

Following the release of Rock Band 4 for the PlayStation 4 and Xbox One, all previously purchased downloadable content for Rock Band 3 and earlier is forward compatible (with the exception of any downloadable content purchased for The Beatles: Rock Band) within the same system family at no additional cost.

32 downloadable Rock Band songs were released in 2007, 15 of which appeared alongside the launch of Rock Band on November 20, including song packs for Queens of the Stone Age, Metallica, and The Police.

== List of songs released in 2007 ==
The following songs have been released for the Rock Band games in the year 2007. All songs available in packs are also available as individual song downloads on the same date, unless otherwise noted. Dates listed are the initial release of songs on Xbox Live.

Some songs released before Rock Band 3 have been retrofitted to include Rock Band 3 features, including backing vocals, and the ability to buy an additional pack for Pro Guitar/Bass charts without having to buy the "RB3 Version" of the song. Certain songs have been marked "family friendly" by Harmonix; such songs released before Rock Band 3's launch on October 26, 2010 can be played in Lego Rock Band.

Starting October 26 (with The Doors), all new songs are only playable in Rock Band 3, due to a change in the file format. All songs released via downloadable content are playable in Rock Band 3, and support its new Pro Drum mode. Most songs released for Rock Band 3 include core features for keyboards, Pro Keyboards, and backing vocals in the core song, where they are appropriate. Additionally, some of these songs features charts for Pro Guitar and Bass that can also be purchased.

Song title	Artist	Year	Genre	Single / Pack name	Release date	Family Friendly	Additional Rock Band 3 Features
"Fortunate Son" (Cover Version) (Note: Track uses a cover version of the song, rather than a master recording.)	Creedence Clearwater Revival	1969	Southern Rock	Single	Nov 20, 2007	Yes	None
"Juke Box Hero" (Cover Version) (Note: Song is no longer available for purchase.)	Foreigner	1981	Classic Rock	Single	Nov 20, 2007	Yes	None
"Bang a Gong" (Cover Version)	T. Rex	1971	Glam	Single	Nov 20, 2007	No	None
"My Sharona" (Cover Version)	The Knack	1979	Pop-Rock	Single	Nov 20, 2007	No	Pro Guitar/Bass
"Cherry Bomb" (Cover Version)	The Runaways	1976	Punk	Single	Nov 20, 2007	No	None
"Joker & the Thief"	Wolfmother	2005	Rock	Single	Nov 20, 2007	Yes	None
"Ride the Lightning"	Metallica	1984	Metal	Metallica 01	Nov 20, 2007	No	None
"Blackened"	Metallica	1988	Metal	Metallica 01	Nov 20, 2007	No	None
"...And Justice for All"	Metallica	1988	Metal	Metallica 01	Nov 20, 2007	No	Pro Guitar/Bass
"3's & 7's"	Queens of the Stone Age	2007	Alternative	Queens of the Stone Age 01	Nov 20, 2007	No	None
"Little Sister"	Queens of the Stone Age	2005	Alternative	Queens of the Stone Age 01	Nov 20, 2007	No	None
"Sick, Sick, Sick"	Queens of the Stone Age	2007	Alternative	Queens of the Stone Age 01	Nov 20, 2007	No	None
"Can't Stand Losing You"	The Police	1978	Rock	The Police 01	Nov 20, 2007	No	None
"Synchronicity II"	The Police	1983	Rock	The Police 01	Nov 20, 2007	No	None
"Roxanne"	The Police	1978	Rock	The Police 01	Nov 20, 2007	No	None
"Heroes" (Cover Version)	David Bowie	1977	Glam	David Bowie 01	Nov 27, 2007	Yes	None
"Moonage Daydream"	David Bowie	1972	Glam	David Bowie 01	Nov 27, 2007	No	None
"Queen Bitch" (Cover Version)	David Bowie	1971	Glam	David Bowie 01	Nov 27, 2007	No	None
"N.I.B." (Cover Version)	Black Sabbath	1970	Metal	Black Sabbath 01	Dec 4, 2007	No	None
"Sweet Leaf" (Cover Version)	Black Sabbath	1971	Metal	Black Sabbath 01	Dec 4, 2007	No	None
"War Pigs" (Cover Version)	Black Sabbath	1970	Metal	Black Sabbath 01	Dec 4, 2007	No	None
"Ever Fallen in Love" (Cover Version)	Buzzcocks	1978	Punk	Punk 01	Dec 11, 2007	Yes	None
"I Fought the Law"	The Clash	1977	Punk	Punk 01	Dec 11, 2007	Yes	None
"Rockaway Beach"	Ramones	1977	Punk	Punk 01	Dec 11, 2007	Yes	None
"My Iron Lung"	Radiohead	1994	Alternative	Single	Dec 18, 2007	No	None
"Brass in Pocket" (Cover Version)	The Pretenders	1980	New Wave	Single	Dec 18, 2007	Yes	None
"Buddy Holly"	Weezer	1994	Alternative	Single	Dec 18, 2007	Yes	None
"Attack"	30 Seconds to Mars	2005	Emo	Single	Dec 25, 2007	No	None
"The Kill"	30 Seconds to Mars	2005	Emo	Single	Dec 25, 2007	Yes	None
"Dirty Little Secret"	All-American Rejects	2005	Emo	Single	Dec 25, 2007	Yes	None
"Move Along"	All-American Rejects	2005	Emo	Single	Dec 25, 2007	Yes	None
"Song with a Mission" (Cover Version)	The Sounds	2006	New Wave	Single	Dec 25, 2007	Yes	None
