= Looking Back with Love =

Studio album by Mike Love
- Released: October 8, 1981
- Recorded: 1980–1981
- Studios: Santa Barbara Sound and Mike Love's mobile studio, Santa Barbara, California
- Genre: Pop rock
- Length: 32:26
- Label: Boardwalk
- Producer: Curt Boettcher

Mike Love chronology
| Looking Back with Love (1981) | Unleash the Love (2017) |

Singles from Looking Back with Love
- 1. "Looking Back with Love" Released: 1981; 2. "Runnin' Around the World" Released: 1981; 3. "Be My Baby" Released: 1982

Professional ratings
Review scores
| Source | Rating |
|---|---|
| AllMusic | 4/5 stars |
| MusicHound Rock: The Essential Album Guide | woof! |
| The Rolling Stone Album Guide | 1/5 stars |

Looking Back with Love is the debut solo studio album by American musician Mike Love, co-founder of the Beach Boys. It was released on October 8, 1981, through Boardwalk Records. Produced by Curt Boettcher, the album includes a mix of covers and originals.

== Songs ==
The lyrics to the title track were written by Love's manager, Dan Parker.

"On and On and On" is a cover of an ABBA song which was itself influenced by the 1968 Beach Boys song "Do It Again".

Love's cover of "Be My Baby" originates from May 1980 sessions produced by (and featuring keyboards by) his Beach Boys bandmate and cousin Brian Wilson. However, the released track features additional overdubs and production completed without Wilson, and Curt Boettcher receives the sole production credit.

== Critical reception ==
The Rolling Stone Album Guide called the album "notable only for its title track: an egregious 'salute' to those crazy ol' '60s that would probably make a dandy Republican campaign jingle."

== Track listing ==
| No. | Title | Writer(s) | Length |
|---|---|---|---|
| 1. | "Looking Back with Love" | Jim Studer, Craig Thomas, Dan Parker | 3:38 |
| 2. | "On and On and On" | Benny Andersson, Björn Ulvaeus | 3:02 |
| 3. | "Runnin' Around the World" | James Haymer, Blair Aaronson | 2:48 |
| 4. | "Over and Over" | Robert James Byrd | 2:16 |
| 5. | "Rockin' the Man in the Boat" | Studer, Jim Arnold, Michael Brady | 3:20 |
| 6. | "Calendar Girl" | Neil Sedaka, Howard Greenfield | 3:16 |
| 7. | "Be My Baby" | Ellie Greenwich, Jeff Barry, Phil Spector | 2:39 |
| 8. | "One Good Reason" | Studer, Brady | 4:08 |
| 9. | "Teach Me Tonight" | Sammy Cahn, Gene De Paul | 3:28 |
| 10. | "Paradise Found" | Mike Love, Studer | 3:51 |
