= List of Britannia High songs =

This is a list of the songs from the United Kingdom TV Show, Britannia High. The songs feature artists Mitch Hewer as Danny, Georgina Hagen as Lauren, Sapphire Elia as Claudine, Matthew James Thomas as Jez, Marcquelle Ward as BB, and Rana Roy as Lola.

| Title | Artist(s) | Composer(s) | Featured Episode |
|---|---|---|---|
| "Start of Something" | Danny, Lauren, Jez, BB, Lola and Claudine | Eliot Kennedy/Gary Barlow/Andy Hill | Ep. 1, "Let's Dance!", Ep. 9 "Finale" |
| "Watch This Space" | Lauren and Claudine | Stephen Lipson/Nina Woodford/Phil Thornalley | Ep. 1, "Let's Dance!", Ep. 9 "Finale" |
| "Best of Me" | Lauren | Eliot Kennedy/Gary Barlow/Gary Go/James Bourne | Ep. 1, "Let's Dance!", Ep. 9 "Finale" |
| "Changing Man" | Danny and Lauren | Bryn Christopher/Matt Prime/Tim Woodcock | Ep. 2, "Behind the Mask", Ep. 9 "Finale" |
| "I'm The Man" | Danny | Stephen Lipson/Gary Go/Mark Owen | Ep. 2, "Behind the Mask", Ep. 8, "With a Little Help From My Friends" |
| "Missing Person" | Danny | Eliot Kennedy/Gary Barlow/Gary Go | Ep. 2, "Behind the Mask" |
| "Wake Up" | Jez | Eliot Kennedy/Steve Robson/Andy Hill | Ep. 3, "Who Are You?", Ep. 9 "Finale", Ep. 8, "With a Little Help From My Friends" |
| "I Am Who I Am" | Jez | Steve Lipson/Andy Hill/Gary Go | Ep. 3, "Who Are You?" |
| "Proud" | Jez | Steve Mac/Wayne Hector/Andy Hill | Ep. 3, "Who Are You?", Ep. 9 "Finale" |
| "Overnight Sensation" | Lola | Guy Chambers/Andy Hill/Chris Braide | Ep. 4, "Fame" |
| "Get Over Yourself" | Claudine, Lauren and Cast | Guy Chambers/James Bourne/Phil Thornalley | Ep. 4, "Fame" |
| "Picking Up the Pieces" | Lola, Lauren and Claudine | Martin Sutton/Ina Wroldsen/Mark Owen | Ep. 4, "Fame", Ep. 8, "With a Little Help From My Friends" |
| "Fight Song" | BB and Jez | Steve Mac/Chris Braide/Mark Owen | Ep. 5, "Go Your Own Way" |
| "Confessions" | BB and the girls | Eliot Kennedy/Gary Barlow/Jem Godfrey/Bill Padley/Sarah Osuji/Hannah Thomson/Alana Hood | Ep. 5, "Go Your Own Way" |
| "The Things That We Don't Say" | BB | Martin Sutton/Chris Neil/Francis White | Ep. 5, "Go Your Own Way", Ep. 9 "Finale" |
| "You Got Nothing on Me" | Claudine | Chris Neil/Ina Wroldsen/Martin Sutton | Ep. 6, "Miss Independent" |
| "Wake The Dead" | Claudine and the Cast | Karen Poole/Steve Lipson/James Bourne | Ep. 6, "Miss Independent" |
| "Growing Pains" | Danny and Claudine | Eliot Kennedy/Chris Braide/Nina Woodford | Ep. 6, "Miss Independent", Ep. 9 "Finale" |
| "Body to Body" | Stefan and Lola | Martin Terefe/Karen Poole/Jem Godfrey | Ep. 7, "Don't Stand So Close to Me" |
| "Obsession" | Lola and Stefan | Eliot Kennedy/Chris Braide/Karen Poole | Ep. 7, "Don't Stand So Close to Me" |
| "What Good is Love?" | Jez and Lauren | Gary Barlow/Chris Braide/Stephen Lipson | Ep. 7, "Don't Stand So Close to Me" |
| "So High" | Lauren and the Cast | Stephen Lipson/Nina Woodford | Ep. 8, "With a Little Help From My Friends" |
| "Weight of the World" | Jez | Guy Chambers/Mark Owen/Ina Wroldsen | Ep. 8, "With a Little Help From My Friends" |
| "Do It All Over Again" | Claudine | Eliot Kennedy/Gary Barlow/Ina Wroldsen | Ep. 8, "With a Little Help From My Friends" |
| "Body to Body" | Jez, Lola, BB & Danny | Martin Terefe/Karen Poole/Jem Godfrey | Ep. 9, "Finale" |
| "Without You" | Danny, Lauren, Claudine, BB, Jez and Lola | Gary Barlow/Lucie Silvas/Eliot Kennedy | Ep. 9, "Finale |
