= List of songs recorded by Memphis Minnie =

This is the complete list of songs recorded by Memphis Minnie, in alphabetical order.

== A–C ==
- "A Little Too Late"
- "After While Blues"
- "Ain't No Use Tryin' to Tell On Me (I Know Something on You)"
- "Ain't Nobody Home but Me"
- "Bad Outside Friends"
- "Ball and Chain Blues"
- "Banana Man Blues"
- "Beat It Right"
- "Black Cat Blues"
- "Black Rat Swing"
- "Black Widow Stinger"
- "Blue Monday Blues"
- "Blues Everywhere"
- "Botherin' That Thing"
- "Boy Friend Blues"
- "Broken Heart"
- "Bumble Bee"
- "Call the Fire Wagon"
- "Can I Do It for You"
- "Can't Afford to Lose My Man"
- "Caught Me Wrong Again"
- "Cherry Ball Blues"
- "Chickasaw Train Blues (Low Down Dirty Thing)"
- "Conjur Man"
- "Crazy Cryin' Blues"

== D–F ==
- "Daybreak Blues"
- "Dirty Dauber Blues"
- "Dirty Mother for You"
- "Doctor, Doctor Blues"
- "Don't Lead My Baby Wrong"
- "Don't Turn the Card"
- "Don't Want No Woman"
- "Down by the Riverside"
- "Down Home Girl"
- "Down in New Orleans"
- "Down in the Alley"
- "Dragging My Heart Around"
- "Drunken Barrel House Blues"
- "Ethel Bea"
- "Fashion Plate Daddy"
- "Fingerprint Blues"
- "Fish Man Blues"
- "Fishin' Blues"
- "Frankie Jean (That Trottin' Fool)"
- "'Frisco Town"

== G–I ==
- "Garage Fire Blues"
- "Georgia Skin"
- "Give It to Me in My Hand (Can I Go Home with You)"
- "Goin' Back to Texas"
- "Good Biscuits"
- "Good Morning"
- "Good Soppin'"
- "Got to Leave You No. 1"
- "Got to Leave You No. 2"
- "Grandpa and Grandma Blues"
- "Has Anyone Seen My Man?"
- "He's in the Ring (Doing That Same Old Thing)"
- "Hold Me Blues"
- "Hole in the Wall"
- "Hoodoo Lady"
- "Hot Stuff"
- "Hustlin' Woman Blues"
- "I Am Sailin'"
- "I Called You This Morning"
- "I Don't Want No Woman I Have to Give My Money To"
- "I Don't Want That Junk Outa You"
- "I Don't Want You No More"
- "I Got To Make a Change Blues"
- "I Hate to See the Sun Go Down"
- "I Hope Love Will Change Some Day"
- "I Never Told a Lie"
- "Ice Man Blues"
- "Ice Man (Come On Up)"
- "I'd Rather See Him Dead"
- "If You See My Rooster (Please Run Him Home)"
- "I'm a Bad Luck Woman"
- "I'm a Gambling Woman"
- "I'm Going Back Home"
- "I'm Going Don't You Know"
- "I'm Gonna Bake My Biscuits"
- "I'm Not a Bad Gal"
- "I'm So Glad"
- "I'm Talking About You"
- "I'm Waiting On You"
- "I'm Wild About My Stuff"
- "In Love Again"
- "In My Girlish Days"
- "It Was You, Baby"
- "It's Hard to Be Mistreated"
- "It's Hard to Please My Man"
- "I've Been Treated Wrong"

== J–L ==
- "Jailhouse Trouble Blues"
- "Jockey Man Blues"
- "Joe Louis Strut"
- "Joliet Bound"
- "Jump Little Rabbit"
- "Keep It to Yourself"
- "Keep On Eatin'"
- "Keep On Goin'"
- "Keep On Sailin'"
- "Keep Your Big Mouth Shut"
- "Kid Man Blues"
- "Kind Treatment Blues"
- "Killer Diller Blues"
- "Killer Diller from the South"
- "Kissing in the Dark"
- "Lake Michigan"
- "Lean Meat Won't Fry"
- "Let Me Ride"
- "Let's Go to Town"
- "Living the Best I Can"
- "Long As I Can See You Smile"
- "Look What You Got"
- "Looking the World Over"
- "Lonesome Shack Blues"
- "Love Come and Go"
- "Low Down Man Blues"

== M–O ==
- "Ma Rainey"
- "Man, You Won't Give Me No Money"
- "Me and My Chauffeur Blues"
- "Mean Mistreater Blues"
- "Memphis Minnie-Jitis Blues"
- "Meningitis Blues"
- "Million Dollar Blues"
- "Moaning the Blues"
- "Moonshine"
- "Mr. Tango Blues"
- "My Baby Don't Want Me No More"
- "My Black Buffalo"
- "My Butcher Man"
- "My Gage Is Going Up"
- "My Man Is Gone Again"
- "My Mary Blues"
- "My Strange Man"
- "My Wash Woman's Gone"
- "New Bumble Bee Blues"
- "New Caught Me Wrong Again"
- "New Dirty Dozen"
- "New Orleans Stop Time"
- "Night Watchmen Blues"
- "North Memphis Blues"
- "Nothing in Rambling"
- "Oh, Believe Me"
- "Out in the Cold"

== P–R ==
- "Pickin' the Blues"
- "Pig Meat on the Line"
- "Pile Driving Blues"
- "Please Don't Stop Him"
- "Please Set a Date"
- "Plymouth Rock Blues"
- "Poor and Wandering Woman Blues"
- "Preacher's Blues"
- "Reachin' Pete"
- "Remember Me Blues"
- "Running and Dodging Blues"

== S–T ==
- "Selling My Pork Chops"
- "She Put Me Outdoors"
- "She Wouldn't Give Me None"
- "Shout the Boogie"
- "Soo Cow Soo"
- "Squat It"
- "Stinging Snake Blues"
- "Stop Lying to Me"
- "Sweet Man"
- "Sylvester and His Mule Blues"
- "That Will Be Allright"
- "The Man I Love"
- "The Saint"
- "This Is Your Last Chance Baby"
- "Three Times Seven Blues"
- "Today Today Blues"
- "Tonight I Smile with You"
- "Too Late"
- "True Love"

== W–Y ==
- "Walking and Crying Blues"
- "Wants Cake When I'm Hungry"
- "Weary Woman's Blues"
- "Western Union"
- "What a Night"
- "What Fault You Find of Me? Part 1"
- "What Fault You Find of Me? Part 2"
- "What's the Matter with the Mill?"
- "When My Man Comes Home"
- "When the Levee Breaks"
- "When the Saints Go Marching Home"
- "When the Sun Goes Down"
- "When You Love Me"
- "When You're Asleep"
- "Where Is My Good Man"
- "Why Did I Make You Cry"
- "World of Trouble"
- "Worried Baby Blues"
- "You Can't Give It Away"
- "You Got to Get Out of Here"
- "You Got to Move"
- "You Need a Friend"
- "You Wrecked My Happy Home"
