= List of songs about Montreal =

This is a list of songs about Montreal, the second-most populous city in Canada and most populous city in the Canadian province of Quebec.

== Background ==
According to the Montreal Gazette, "songwriters and poets have been hallucinating over Montreal for ages. It's a city where small-towners from the regions dream of making their mark, a city of love where nights on the Main can give you frissons and being alone makes no sense, a city dwarfed by the otherworldly cross atop Mount Royal." In songs, the city frequently has been compared to Paris and viewed as the "Paris of North America".

In 2012, to celebrate its 20th year, the Pointe-à-Callière Museum, which aims to promote the history of Montreal, published a ranking of the five songs about Montreal that most outstandingly discuss it. The ranking was based on votes from thousands of online users.

== List ==
This list includes only songs for which at least one reliable source says that the song is about Montreal.

Single	Artist(s)	Details
"Demain matin, Montréal m’attend"	Michel Tremblay, François Dompierre, and Louise Forestier (Note: Michel Tremblay wrote the lyrics, François Dompierre wrote the music, and Louise Forestier sang the piece.)	Pointe-à-Callière Museum selected the song as one of five best songs about Montreal.
"Hello Montreal"	Billy Rose, Mort Dixon, and Harry Warren (Note: Billy Rose and Mort Dixon wrote the words. Harry Warren wrote the music.)	During Prohibition, people considered Montreal to be ancillary to New York City. Montreal served large quantities of alcohol. A 1928 song, Hello Montreal spoke to this dynamic in its lyrics, "Speak easy, speak easy, and tell the bunch / I won't go east, I won't go west, got a different hunch / I'll be leaving in the summer, and I won't be back till fall / Goodbye Broadway, hello Montreal."
"I Just Wanna Stop"	Gino Vannelli	In the song's first sentence, Vannelli performs, "When I think about those nights in Montreal".
"J'ai souvenir encore"	Claude Dubois	Pointe-à-Callière Museum selected the song as one of five best songs about Montreal.
"Le blues de la Métropole"	Beau Dommage	Pointe-à-Callière Museum selected the song as one of five best songs about Montreal.
"Les Nuits de Montréal"	Jacques Normand	The English translation of the 1949 French-language song's title is "Montreal by Night". Observing that it is so common to listen to Paris nights in places like Place Pigalle and Montmartre, the song says, "Mais ici on a aussi" ("Here we also have").
"Je reviendrai à Montréal"	Robert Charlebois	After the songwriter relocated to France, in 1976 he created the song. Three days prior to the 1995 Quebec referendum for sovereignty, at a Place du Canada rally opposing independence, the event organizers played the song at its completion. Pointe-à-Callière Museum selected the song as one of five best songs about Montreal.
"The Main"	Nanette Workman	The blues song warmly lauds Montreal's rowdy nightlife experiences.
"Montreal"	Kelly McMichael	Kelly McMichael is a singer-songwriter from Newfoundland. In the song, she longingly commemorates a trip she made to the city over the summer. Calling it "the best time of my life", she found that although later trips to Montreal are enjoyable, "it's never quite as nice".
"Montreal"	Ariane Moffatt	Moffatt is a singer-songwriter from Quebec. Again and again, her lyrics say "Je reviens à Montréal" which when translated from French to English means "I'm coming back to Montreal." Pointe-à-Callière Museum selected the song as one of five best songs about Montreal.
"Montreal"	Allison Russell	The song's lyrics are in English and French, fluctuating between the two. Exclaim! called the song "a loving tribute to the city where [Russell] was born, full of nostalgic lyrics about cathedrals, 'azure light' and how 'shadows felt like loving arms'".
"Montreal"	Penelope Scott	With "self-defeating lyrics" throughout, the song discusses how a prepared trip to Montreal was ostensibly discarded. Scott sings in a funny and dispiriting manner, "It's not that it's a bad plan / No, the plan fuckin' slapped."
"'Montreal"	The Tragically Hip	The École Polytechnique massacre happened at the Montreal engineering school Polytechnique Montréal and resulted in the deaths of 14 women and wounded another 14 people. The massacre was the stimulus for the song which has the lyrics "The snow is so merciless / On poor old Montreal".
"This Is the Dream of Win and Regine"	Owen Pallett	The song is inspired by the founders of the Montreal band Arcade Fire, husband and wife Win Butler and Régine Chassagne. Its chorus says, "Montreal might eat its young/but Montreal won't break us down." According to SB Nation, the songwriter is discussing "the infamously caustic and self-cannibalizing nature of the local indie music scene".
"Theme for Montreal"	John Labelle	David Johnston of the Montreal Gazette said of the song, "It's a little sappy, no doubt about it, but it works as our version of 'New York, New York' or 'I Left My Heart in San Francisco'."
"Suzanne"	Leonard Cohen	The song showcases how Montreal's waterways are enticing and is set at night in August in which the singer observes the river. Cohen said in an interview with Maclean's, "It was about the beginning of a different life for me, my life wandering alone in Montreal."
