= Youngblood (Carl Wilson album) =

Studio album by Carl Wilson
- Released: February 1983
- Recorded: 1982 – 1983
- Genre: Pop, rock and roll
- Length: 36:42
- Label: Caribou
- Producer: Jeff Baxter

Carl Wilson chronology
Carl Wilson (1981)	Youngblood (1983)	Like a Brother with Gerry Beckley and Robert Lamm (2000)

Professional ratings
Review scores
Source	Rating
Allmusic	2.5/5 stars

Youngblood is the second and final solo studio album by Carl Wilson. It was released in 1983 by Caribou Records. It was re-issued on CD on September 21, 2010.

== Writing ==
Wilson said, "This time, that soul or rhythm-and-blues flavor is most evident in the writing. I loved those soul records that were coming out in the mid-1960s, and all the great singers who were around then. I wanted that edgy kind of emotional energy in the songs, so you can really feel them."

== Reception ==
Robert Palmer of The New York Times said the album "will appeal to some of those people who find Beach Boys music too sweet and bland. It's guitar-based mainstream rock, with soul and gospel roots, a far cry from the blue-eyed barbershop harmonies popularized by the Beach Boys."

== Track listing ==
All tracks composed by Carl Wilson and Myrna Smith; except where indicated.

1. "What More Can I Say" – 3:26
2. "She's Mine" – 3:04
3. "Givin' You Up" (Carl Wilson, Myrna Smith, Jerry Schilling) – 4:41
4. "One More Night Alone" (Billy Hinsche) – 3:05
5. "Rockin' All Over the World" (J.C. Fogerty) – 3:00
6. "What You Do to Me" (John Hall, Johanna Hall) – 3:56
7. "Young Blood" (Jerry Leiber, Mike Stoller, Doc Pomus) – 2:42
8. "Of the Times" – 4:07
9. "Too Early to Tell" (Carl Wilson, Myrna Smith, John Daly) – 2:51
10. "If I Could Talk to Love" – 4:10
11. "Time" – 3:00
12. "Givin' You Up (Single Edit)" [CD bonus track] (Carl Wilson, Myrna Smith, Jerry Schilling) - 4:14

== Personnel ==
- Carl Wilson – guitar, lead vocals, backing vocals, harmony vocals on "Rockin' All Over the World"
- Jeff Baxter, Geo Conner – guitar, backing vocals
- John Daly, Elliott Randall, Trevor Veitch – guitar
- Billy Hinsche – keyboards, guitar, backing vocals
- Vinnie Colaiuta, Ed Greene, Alan Krigger – drums
- Gerald Johnson, Neil Stubenhaus – bass guitar
- Jim Ehinger – piano, keyboards
- Nicky Hopkins – piano
- Lon Price, Bryan Cummings, Ron Viola – tenor saxophone
- Jerry Peterson – baritone saxophone
- Lee Thornburg – tenor saxophone, flugelhorn
- Myrna Smith-Schilling – backing vocals
- Timothy B. Schmit – backing vocals
- Burton Cummings – backing vocals on “Rockin’ All Over the World” and “Young Blood”
- Billie Barman – backing vocals
- Phyllis St. James – backing vocals
- Krohn McHenry – backing vocals

Technical personnel

- Jeff Baxter – producer
- Larold Rebhun – engineer

== Charts ==
Singles

Billboard (United States)

Year	Single	Chart	Position
1983	"What You Do to Me"	Billboard Hot 100	72
1983	"What You Do to Me"	Adult Contemporary	20
