= List of songs in Guitar Hero: Aerosmith =

Guitar Hero: Aerosmith is a music video game developed by Neversoft and published by Activision. It is the second expansion title to the Guitar Hero series of video games, and was released in June 2008 for the Xbox 360, PlayStation 2, PlayStation 3, and Wii game consoles. It is the first title in the series to focus primarily on the works of one specific band, Aerosmith. The majority of the game's set list are works by Aerosmith, but there are also works by artists that have acted as inspirations or touring partners for the band such as Run-D.M.C., The Kinks, and Joan Jett. In addition to 25 Aerosmith songs, there are four songs from lead guitarist Joe Perry's solo album. The game contains a total of 41 songs.

Guitar Hero: Aerosmith's gameplay is structured similarly to the gameplay of the other games in the series, in which players use a guitar-shaped peripheral to simulate the playing of rock music, hitting fret buttons and strumming in time to notes as they scroll on the screen. The player's performance is tracked through each song; if the player does well they are given a score and a rating of up to five stars; if the player performs poorly, the song may end prematurely and the player will need to try the song again. Each song can be played at one of four difficulties that changes the number and speed of the notes that must be played.

== Main setlist ==
The primary single player mode is the Career Mode, in which the player works through 31 songs divided into six sequential tiers as listed below, each representing a different chapter and at a different location during Aerosmith's career and reflecting an increasing difficulty in the songs. In Guitar Hero: Aerosmith, the first two songs of each tier, representing opening acts, must be successfully completed before two Aerosmith or Joe Perry songs are presented. Once these are complete, the player then must complete (or turn down) the Encore song before they can move onto the next tier. The tiers are arranged as to follow Aerosmith's rise to success, starting at their first performance at Mendon-Upton Nipmuc Regional High School, up through their performance at the Super Bowl XXXV halftime show and their induction into the Rock and Roll Hall of Fame. The last tier features an additional Boss Battle against Joe Perry. In addition to the 31 main songs, ten additional songs can be unlocked from "The Vault" using in-game money earned during Career Mode. Once songs have been unlocked in Career Mode or from "The Vault", the player may then play these songs at any time in Quickplay mode, play co-operatively with another player performing the bass or rhythm guitar line, or compete in head-to-head battles offline or online. There is no Co-op Career Mode as was present in Guitar Hero III: Legends of Rock.

While tracks from Deep Purple and The White Stripes were initially reported to be in the game, they are not in the final setlist. There were no plans to offer the tracks from the game as downloadable content for Guitar Hero III or Guitar Hero World Tour. However, "Rag Doll", "Love in an Elevator" and "Livin' on the Edge" were later released as full band DLC for Guitar Hero 5 on 18 May.

All Aerosmith and Joe Perry songs in the game are master recordings as marked in the table below; in the case of four Aerosmith songs, these were specifically re-recorded for the game due to the lack of existing master recordings. All but four of the "opening acts" are also master recordings; in the case of the other four songs, these are cover versions performed either by WaveGroup Sound or Steve Ouimette. The year column in the table reflects the year the song was recorded as stated in the game.

Year	Song title	Artist	Master recording?	Tier
1964	"All Day and All of the Night"	The Kinks (cover by WaveGroup)		2. "First Taste of Success"; (Max’s Kansas City)
1972	"All the Young Dudes"	Mott the Hoople (cover by WaveGroup)		1. "Getting the Band Together"; (Nipmuc High School)
1991	"Always on the Run"	Lenny Kravitz and Slash	✓	5. "The Great American Band"; (Half Time Show)
1976	"Back in the Saddle"	Aerosmith	✓	5. "The Great American Band"; (Half Time Show)
2001	"Beyond Beautiful"^{b}	Aerosmith	✓	5. "The Great American Band"; (Half Time Show)
1977	"Bright Light Fright"	Aerosmith	✓	4. "International Superstars"; (Moscow)
1977	"Cat Scratch Fever"	Ted Nugent	✓	6. "Rock N Roll Legends"; (Rock & Roll Hall of Fame)
1977	"Complete Control"	The Clash	✓	3. "The Triumphant Return"; (The Orpheum)
1977	"Draw the Line"	Aerosmith	✓	1. "Getting the Band Together"; (Nipmuc High School) (encore)
1973	"Dream On"^{a}	Aerosmith	✓	5. "The Great American Band"; (Half Time Show) (encore)
1979	"Dream Police"	Cheap Trick	✓	1. "Getting the Band Together"; (Nipmuc High School)
2008	"Guitar Battle vs Joe Perry"^{b}	Joe Perry	✓	6. "Rock N Roll Legends"; (Rock & Roll Hall of Fame)
1990	"Hard to Handle"	The Black Crowes (cover by Steve Ouimette)		5. "The Great American Band"; (Half Time Show)
1988	"I Hate Myself for Loving You"	Joan Jett	✓	2. "First Taste of Success"; (Max’s Kansas City)
1985	"King of Rock"	Run-D.M.C.	✓	4. "International Superstars"; (Moscow)
1993	"Livin' on the Edge"	Aerosmith	✓	3. "The Triumphant Return"; (The Orpheum)
1989	"Love in an Elevator"^{b}	Aerosmith	✓	3. "The Triumphant Return"; (The Orpheum) (encore)
1973	"Make It"^{a}	Aerosmith	✓	1. "Getting the Band Together"; (Nipmuc High School)
1973	"Mama Kin"^{a}	Aerosmith	✓	6. "Rock N Roll Legends"; (Rock & Roll Hall of Fame)
1973	"Movin' Out"^{a}	Aerosmith	✓	2. "First Taste of Success"; (Max’s Kansas City)
1979	"No Surprize"^{b}	Aerosmith	✓	2. "First Taste Of Success"; (Max’s Kansas City)
1976	"Nobody's Fault"	Aerosmith	✓	4. "International Superstars"; (Moscow)
1973	"Personality Crisis"	New York Dolls (cover by Steve Ouimette)		3. "The Triumphant Return"; (The Orpheum)
1987	"Rag Doll"^{b}	Aerosmith	✓	3. "The Triumphant Return"; (The Orpheum)
1992	"Sex Type Thing"	Stone Temple Pilots	✓	6. "Rock N Roll Legends"; (Rock & Roll Hall of Fame)
1985	"She Sells Sanctuary"	The Cult	✓	4. "International Superstars"; (Moscow)
1975	"Sweet Emotion"	Aerosmith	✓	2. "First Taste of Success"; (Max’s Kansas City) (encore)
1975	"Toys in the Attic"	Aerosmith	✓	6. "Rock N Roll Legends"; (Rock & Roll Hall of Fame)
1974	"Train Kept A-Rollin'"	Aerosmith	✓	6. "Rock N Roll Legends"; (Rock & Roll Hall of Fame) (encore)
1975	"Uncle Salty"	Aerosmith	✓	1. "Getting the Band Together"; (Nipmuc High School)
1986	"Walk This Way"	Aerosmith featuring Run-D.M.C.	✓	4. "International Superstars"; (Moscow) (encore)

- ^aThis song has been re-recorded for use in Guitar Hero: Aerosmith
- ^b Song has a rhythm guitar track instead of a bass guitar co-operative play track.

== Bonus songs ==
Bonus songs can be purchased using in-game money at "The Vault", along with additional characters, outfits, guitars and finishes, and video interviews with Aerosmith. Once purchased, the player may play these songs in Quickplay, co-operative, or competitive modes. All bonus songs in the game are master recordings.

Year	Song title	Artist
1976	"Combination"	Aerosmith
2007	"Joe Perry Guitar Battle"^{a}	Joe Perry
1977	"Kings and Queens"	Aerosmith
1985	"Let the Music Do the Talking"^{a}	Aerosmith
2005	"Mercy"	Joe Perry
1974	"Pandora's Box"	Aerosmith
1998	"Pink"	Aerosmith
1976	"Rats in the Cellar"^{a}	Aerosmith
2005	"Shakin' My Cage"	Joe Perry
2005	"Talk Talkin"^{a}	Joe Perry
1975	"Walk This Way"	Aerosmith

- ^a Song has a rhythm guitar track instead of a bass guitar co-operative play track.
