= List of songs recorded by Blind Joe Reynolds =

This is a list of the songs recorded by Blind Joe Reynolds.

Paramount Records, c. November 1929 in Grafton, WI

- "Cold Woman Blues" Paramount 12983, released 1929
- "Nehi Blues" Paramount 12927, released 1929
- "Ninety Nine Blues" Paramount 12983, released 1929
- "Outside Woman Blues" Paramount 12927, released 1929

Victor Records, November 26, 1930 in Memphis, TN

- "Goose Hill Woman Blues" unreleased, believed lost
- "Married Man Blues" Victor 23258, released 1930
- "Short Dress" unreleased, believed lost
- "Third Street Woman Blues" Victor 23258, released 1930
