= Myrna Smith =

American singer and songwriter (1941–2010)

- Born: Myrna Yvonne Smith; May 28, 1941; Newark, New Jersey, U.S.
- Died: December 24, 2010 (aged 69) Canoga Park, California, U.S.
- Genres: Soul; gospel; disco; R&B; pop
- Occupations: Singer; songwriter
- Years active: 1960–2010
- Formerly of: The Sweet Inspirations
- Spouse: Jerry Schilling (m. 1982; div. 1987)

Myrna Yvonne Smith (May 28, 1941 – December 24, 2010) was an American songwriter and singer.

== Biography ==
Smith became a high school English teacher in South Brunswick, New Jersey in the 1960s, while she also pursued her singing career. She was an original member of Dionne Warwick's Gospelaires group which later evolved into the Sweet Inspirations. The Sweet Inspirations backed Dionne Warwick, Aretha Franklin and countless others, and later served as Elvis Presley's backing group. When she joined, the lead singer of the Sweet Inspirations was Cissy Houston, the mother of Whitney Houston and dynamic soprano featured on Aretha Franklin's "Ain't No Way". The Sweet Inspirations would secure their own contract with Atlantic Records and records several albums in the late 60s / early 70s.

In 1973, Smith began dating Jerry Schilling, a friend and associate of Elvis who subsequently also managed the Beach Boys at one point. She was married to Schilling from 1982 to 1987.

In the early 1980s, she co-wrote all of the songs on Carl Wilson's 1981 solo album Carl Wilson, as well as a few of the songs on his 1983 solo album Youngblood, and Wilson's contributions to The Beach Boys' self-titled 1985 album.

While performing on the "Elvis: The Concert" European tour in March 2010, Smith developed pneumonia which eventually led to kidney failure and a stroke. She died on December 24, 2010, in Canoga Park, California, after an illness, five months short of her 70th birthday.
