= Yoshio Kobuki =

Japanese American jockey (1918–1997)

Personal information
- Born: October 17, 1918; Thomas, Washington, US
- Died: 1997 (aged 78–79); Galt, California, US

Sport
- Sport: Horse racing

Joe "Kokomo Joe" Kobuki (born Yoshio Kobuki, sometimes misspelled Kabuki; October 17, 1918 – 1997) was a Japanese American jockey who was the first jockey in the United States of Japanese descent.

== Early life ==
Kobuki was born on October 17, 1918—one month prematurely, in his cabin in Thomas, Washington, the youngest of five siblings. Born a low weight, his mother died on October 28, of Spanish flu. Afterwards, his oldest sibling stayed with their market grower father, while he and his three other siblings—all of the latter whom also later died of Spanish flu—were sent to live in Japan with their maternal aunt.

== Career ==
Returning to the United States in 1934, Kobuki changed his given name to Joe by the time he graduated high school c. 1936. He moved to Los Angeles, getting a job as a stable hand at Santa Anita Park, where a supervisor nicknamed him Kokomo Joe because he couldn't pronounce his name.

He began racing in summer 1941, and won most of his races due to his small stature and light weight. Though, Kobuki experienced racism, with white jockeys—who labelled him "the dirty Jap"—plotting and failing to end his racing career. He also spent World War II in an internment camp. He lost a lot of his skill when he returned to racing, as well as being discriminated against more. During a race in Arizona, his horse was pushed into a fence by another horse, which broke Kobuki's femur and hospitalized him for a year.

After recovering, he returned to racing in June 1948, and was the first licensed jockey of Japanese descent in the United States. He won twice at the Pleasanton Fairgrounds Racetrack in July. Though, track owners refused to let him race beyond then, and Kobuki went to work as a stable hand at the Hollywood Park Racetrack until the 1980s. He lived in a trailer park in Galt during his later life, where he died of cancer in 1997, aged 78 or 79.
