= Unleash the Love =

Studio album by Mike Love
- Released: November 17, 2017
- Recorded: 2004–2017
- Genres: Pop, rock
- Label: BMG
- Producer: Michael Lloyd

Mike Love chronology
| Looking Back with Love (1981) | Unleash the Love (2017) | Reason for the Season (2018) |

Unleash the Love is the second solo studio album by American singer Mike Love. It was released on November 17, 2017.

== Background and production ==
Before Unleash the Love, Mike Love had not officially released a solo album since 1981's Looking Back with Love, released 36 years earlier.

Unleash the Love initially had the title of Mike Love Not War, but that got shelved during the recording process. The term Mike Love Not War had previously been used in a variety of contexts, such as being placed on t-shirts and adopted as a title for an extended play by indie pop group Smudge. Love would later revisit this title with a 2023 solo album.

Speaking with The Guardian in 2013, Love stated that he'd "stockpiled" a collection of songs for possible release "for decades". However, he'd hesitated due to needing to assemble the proper "team to get my music out". Broadly speaking, Love aimed to have the release remark upon "the hopes and aspirations of those on the planet who like to see more positivity and harmony."

== Track listing ==
All tracks composed by Mike Love except where noted.

Disc 1 – Mike Love Originals
| No. | Title | Writer(s) | Length |
|---|---|---|---|
| 1. | "All the Love in Paris" (featuring Dave Koz) | Love, Paul Fauerso | 3:25 |
| 2. | "Getcha Back" (featuring John Stamos) | Love, Terry Melcher | 3:16 |
| 3. | "Daybreak Over the Ocean" | | 5:37 |
| 4. | "I Don’t Wanna Know" | | 3:17 |
| 5. | "Too Cruel" | | 3:02 |
| 6. | "Crescent Moon" | | 3:10 |
| 7. | "Cool Head, Warm Heart" | | 3:17 |
| 8. | "Pisces Brothers" | | 4:17 |
| 9. | "Unleash The Love" | | 3:46 |
| 10. | "Ram Raj" | | 5:34 |
| 11. | "10,000 Years Ago" (featuring John Stamos) | | 4:24 |
| 12. | "Only One Earth" | | 4:07 |
| 13. | "Make Love Not War" | | 3:56 |

All tracks composed by Mike Love and Brian Wilson except where noted.

Disc 2 – Mike Love/Beach Boys Re-Records
| No. | Title | Writer(s) | Length |
|---|---|---|---|
| 1. | "California Girls" | | 2:57 |
| 2. | "Do It Again" (featuring Mark McGrath & John Stamos) | | 2:46 |
| 3. | "Help Me, Rhonda" | | 2:58 |
| 4. | "I Get Around" | | 2:17 |
| 5. | "The Warmth of the Sun" (featuring Ambha Love) | | 3:08 |
| 6. | "Brian's Back" | Love | 3:41 |
| 7. | "Kiss Me Baby" | | 2:56 |
| 8. | "Darlin'" (featuring AJR) | | 2:38 |
| 9. | "Wild Honey" (featuring John Cowsill) | | 3:21 |
| 10. | "Wouldn't It Be Nice" | Love, Wilson, Tony Asher | 2:33 |
| 11. | "Good Vibrations" | | 3:43 |
| 12. | "Fun, Fun, Fun" | | 2:24 |

== Personnel ==
- Mike Love – vocals
- Bruce Johnston – vocals
- Scott Totten – guitar, backing vocals
- Randy Leago – saxophone
- John Ferraro – drums
- Jim Cox – keyboards
- Tim Pierce – guitar
- Paul III – bass guitar
- Michael Lloyd – keyboards, guitar, drums, bass guitar
- Carl Wilson – vocals on "Brian's Back"
- Jeffrey Foskett – rhythm guitar
- Curt Bisquera – drums
- Joel Peskin – tenor saxophone
- Brian Eichenberger – bass guitar, backing vocals
- Paul Fauerso – keyboards, programming, percussion, backing vocals
- John Stamos – drums on "Getcha Back" and "10,000 Years Ago", vocals on "Do It Again"
- Mark McGrath – vocals on "Do It Again"
- Laurence Juber – guitar
- Cliff Hugo – bass guitar
- Dave Koz – saxophone on "All the Love In Paris"
- Adrian Baker – backing vocals
- John Jorgenson – guitar
- John Cowsill – drums, lead vocals on "Wild Honey"
- AJR – vocals on "Darlin'"
- Christian Love – backing vocals
- Brian Love – backing vocals
- Donny Gerrard – backing vocals
- Hayleigh Love – backing vocals
- Edna Wright – backing vocals
- Ambha Love – lead vocals on "The Warmth of the Sun"

== Chart performance ==
- Billboard Independent Albums – #37
