= 2013 in downloadable songs for the Rock Band series =

- Songs released: 41
- Packs released: 3
- Albums released: 0

The Rock Band series of music video games supports downloadable songs for the Xbox 360, PlayStation 3, and Wii versions through the consoles' respective online services. Users can download songs on a track-by-track basis, with many of the tracks also offered as part of a "song pack" or complete album at a discounted rate. These packs are available for the Wii only on Rock Band 3. Most downloadable songs are playable within every game mode, including the Band World Tour career mode. All downloadable songs released before October 26, 2010, are cross-compatible between Rock Band, Rock Band 2 and Rock Band 3, while those after only work with Rock Band 3. All songs that are available to Rock Band 3 are playable in Rock Band Blitz. Certain songs deemed "suitable for all ages" by Harmonix are also available for use in Lego Rock Band.

The Wii version of Rock Band does not support downloadable content, but Rock Band 2 and Rock Band 3 do, with DLC first made available in January 2009. Songs from the back catalogue of downloadable content were released for the Wii weekly in an effort by Harmonix to provide Wii players with every previously available song.

Following the release of Rock Band 4 for the PlayStation 4 and Xbox One, all previously purchased downloadable content for Rock Band 3 and earlier is forward compatible (with the exception of any downloadable content purchased for The Beatles: Rock Band) within the same system family at no additional cost.

== List of songs released in 2013 ==
The following table lists the available songs for the Rock Band series released in 2013. All songs available in packs are also available as individual song downloads on the same date, unless otherwise noted. New songs are released on Tuesdays for Xbox Live, PlayStation Network, and Nintendo WFC, unless otherwise noted. Dates listed are the initial release of songs on Xbox Live. Starting May 20, 2008, all downloadable songs are available in both the North American and European markets, unless otherwise noted.

As of October 2009, over 800 songs have been made available as downloadable content (DLC). As of October 19, 2009, over 60 million downloadable song purchases have been made by players. The following is a list of the songs that have been released in 2013.

Some songs released before Rock Band 3 have been retrofitted to include Rock Band 3 features, including backing vocals, and the ability to buy an additional pack for Pro Guitar/Bass charts without having to buy the "RB3 Version" of the song. Certain songs have been marked "family friendly" by Harmonix; such songs released before Rock Band 3's launch on October 26, 2010 can be played in Lego Rock Band.

Since October 26, 2010 (with The Doors Pack 01), all new songs are only playable in Rock Band 3, due to a change in the file format. All songs released via downloadable content are playable in Rock Band 3, and support its new Pro Drum mode. Most songs released for Rock Band 3 include core features for keyboards, Pro Keyboards, and backing vocals in the core song, where they are appropriate. Additionally, some of these songs features charts for Pro Guitar and Bass that can also be purchased.

In February 2013, Harmonix announced that it would end the regular weekly release of new Rock Band DLC after April 2, 2013 in order to focus work on new projects. However, on January 12, 2015, Harmonix announced that it would release the three new Rock Band 3 DLC, the first in nearly 21 months, the next day.

Song title	Artist	Year	Genre	Single / Pack name	Release date	Family Friendly	Additional Rock Band 3 Features
"Moves Like Jagger" (Note: Songs are also available as imports from Rock Band Blitz.) (Note: Song is no longer available for purchase.)	Maroon 5 ft. Christina Aguilera	2010	Pop-Rock	Single	Jan 8, 2013	No	Core
"Pumped Up Kicks"	Foster the People	2011	Indie Rock	Foster the People 01	Jan 8, 2013	No	Core
"These Days"	Foo Fighters	2011	Alternative	Single	Jan 8, 2013	Yes	Core
"Jessie's Girl"	Rick Springfield	1981	Classic Rock	Rick Springfield 01	Jan 15, 2013	Yes	Core & Pro Guitar/Bass
"I've Done Everything for You"	Rick Springfield	1981	Classic Rock	Rick Springfield 01	Jan 15, 2013	No	Core & Pro Guitar/Bass
"Don't Talk to Strangers"	Rick Springfield	1982	Classic Rock	Rick Springfield 01	Jan 15, 2013	No	Core
"Stronger (What Doesn't Kill You)"	Kelly Clarkson	2011	Pop/Dance/Electronic	Single	Jan 22, 2013	Yes	Core
"Cult of Personality"	Living Colour	1988	Rock	Single	Jan 22, 2013	Yes	Core & Pro Guitar/Bass
"Spoonman"	Soundgarden	1994	Grunge	Single	Jan 22, 2013	No	Core & Pro Guitar/Bass
"Bang Your Head (Metal Health)"	Quiet Riot	1983	Metal	Single	Jan 22, 2013	Yes	Core
"Walk This Way"	Aerosmith	1975	Rock	Aerosmith's Greatest Dimension	Jan 29, 2013	No	Core
"Sweet Emotion"	Aerosmith	1975	Rock	Aerosmith's Greatest Dimension	Jan 29, 2013	No	Core & Pro Guitar/Bass
"Dream On" (Live)	Aerosmith	1973	Rock	Aerosmith's Greatest Dimension	Jan 29, 2013	Yes	Core & Pro Guitar/Bass
"Legendary Child"	Aerosmith	2012	Rock	Aerosmith's Greatest Dimension	Jan 29, 2013	No	Core
"Lover Alot"	Aerosmith	2012	Rock	Aerosmith's Greatest Dimension	Jan 29, 2013	No	Core
"Back in the Saddle"	Aerosmith	1976	Rock	Aerosmith's Greatest Dimension	Jan 29, 2013	No	Core
"Death on Two Legs (Dedicated to...)"	Queen	1975	Classic Rock	Single	Feb 5, 2013	No	Core
"Once Bitten, Twice Shy"	Great White	1989	Glam	Single	Feb 5, 2013	No	Core
"So Far Away"	Avenged Sevenfold	2010	Metal	Single	Feb 5, 2013	Yes	Core
"The Wicker Man"	Iron Maiden	2000	Metal	Single	Feb 5, 2013	Yes	Core & Pro Guitar/Bass
"More Than Words" (Note: Song includes a Pro Guitar chart in the base price; the chart does not need to be purchased separately.)	Extreme	1990	Rock	Single	Feb 12, 2013	Yes	Core & Pro Guitar
"Love Hurts"	Nazareth	1975	Classic Rock	Single	Feb 12, 2013	Yes	Core
"Glory of Love"	Peter Cetera	1986	Pop-Rock	Single	Feb 12, 2013	Yes	Core
"Keep On Loving You"	REO Speedwagon	1980	Classic Rock	Single	Feb 12, 2013	Yes	Core
"Tainted Love"	Soft Cell	1981	Pop/Dance/Electronic	Single	Feb 12, 2013	Yes	Core
"One Week"	Barenaked Ladies	1998	Rock	Single	Feb 19, 2013	No	Core
"Shine (Rock Band Re-Record)"	Collective Soul	1994	Alternative	Single	Feb 19, 2013	Yes	Core
"A Little Less Sixteen Candles, A Little More "Touch Me""	Fall Out Boy	2005	Pop-Rock	Single	Feb 19, 2013	Yes	Core
"Got You (Where I Want You)"	The Flys	1998	Alternative	Single	Feb 26, 2013	No	Core & Pro Guitar/Bass
"Silent Lucidity"	Queensrÿche	1990	Prog	Single	Feb 26, 2013	Yes	Core
"It's Been Awhile"	Staind	2001	Nu-Metal	Single	Feb 26, 2013	No	Core
"So Far Away"	Staind	2003	Nu-Metal	Single	Feb 26, 2013	Yes	Core
"Kids in the Street"	The All-American Rejects	2012	Emo	Single	Mar 5, 2013	No	Core
"Always"	Blink-182	2003	Punk	Single	Mar 5, 2013	Yes	Core
"Give It Away"	Red Hot Chili Peppers	1991	Alternative	Single	Mar 5, 2013	No	Core & Pro Guitar/Bass
"Weird Science"	Oingo Boingo	1985	New Wave	Single	Mar 12, 2013	Yes	Core & Pro Guitar/Bass
"Rosanna"	Toto	1982	Pop-Rock	Single	Mar 12, 2013	Yes	Core
"Diamond Eyes (Boom-Lay Boom-Lay Boom)"	Shinedown	2010	Nu-Metal	Single	Mar 19, 2013	No	Core
"Jungle Boogie"	Kool and the Gang	1973	R&B/Soul/Funk	Single	Mar 19, 2013	Yes	Core & Pro Guitar/Bass
"Shout"	Tears for Fears	1985	New Wave	Single	Mar 19, 2013	Yes	Core
"Send the Pain Below"	Chevelle	2002	Rock	Chevelle 01	Mar 26, 2013	Yes	Core
"The Red"	Chevelle	2002	Rock	Chevelle 01	Mar 26, 2013	Yes	Core & Pro Guitar/Bass
"Face to the Floor"	Chevelle	2011	Rock	Chevelle 01	Mar 26, 2013	Yes	Core
"American Pie"	Don McLean	1971	Classic Rock	Single	Apr 2, 2013	No	Core
