= Carl Wilson (album) =

Studio album by Carl Wilson
- Released: March 27, 1981
- Studios: Caribou Ranch Studios, Nederland, Colorado
- Length: 34:35
- Label: Caribou
- Producer: James William Guercio

Carl Wilson chronology
Carl Wilson (1981)	Youngblood (1983)

Professional ratings
Review scores
Source	Rating
Allmusic	3/5 stars

Carl Wilson is the debut solo album by American musician Carl Wilson. Wilson was reportedly at this time unhappy with the progress being made by The Beach Boys creatively, and like his brother Dennis had a few years earlier, Carl signed a solo contract with James William Guercio's CBS-distributed Caribou Records, which four years prior put out Dennis's album Pacific Ocean Blue, and was also the current label of The Beach Boys. The album was released on March 27, 1981, and peaked at number 185 on the Billboard 200. Of the eight tracks on the album, seven of them are written by Carl Wilson and Myrna Smith, who was the wife of Carl's then manager Jerry Schilling, with the remaining track being co-written by Carl, Myrna and Michael Sun.

== Track listing ==
All music composed by Carl Wilson; all lyrics written by Myrna Smith except where indicated:

=== Side one ===
1. "Hold Me" – 4:03
2. "Bright Lights" – 3:47
3. "What You Gonna Do About Me?" – 4:25
4. "The Right Lane" – 5:13

=== Side two ===
1. "Hurry Love" – 4:44
2. "Heaven" (Myrna Smith, Michael Sun) – 4:23
3. "The Grammy" – 3:04
4. "Seems So Long Ago" – 4:56

== Personnel ==
Credits taken from the original album liner notes

- Carl Wilson – lead (all tracks) and backing vocals (all but 1), electric (all but 8) and acoustic guitars (6–8), synthesizer (3), organ (3), cowbell (1)
- Myrna Smith – lead (1) and backing vocals (all but 1)
- James William Guercio – bass guitar (1–3, 6–8), acoustic guitars (5, 7), percussion (2–6, 8); producer
- John Daly – electric guitar (1, 4, 5), slide guitar (1), pedal steel guitar (6)
- Gerald Johnson – bass guitar (4, 5)
- James Stroud – drums (1–3, 6–8), cowbell (1), tambourine (7), shaker (7)
- Randy McCormick – clavinet (7), Fender Rhodes electric piano (8)
- Joel Peskin – saxophone (8)
- Alan Krigger – drums (4, 5), tambourine (4), Syndrum (4)
- Engineered by Wayne Tarnowski, assisted by David "Gino" Giorgini

== Charts ==
Chart (1981)	Peak position
US Billboard 200 Albums	185
