= List of songs in The Idolmaster video games =

The Idolmaster is a series of raising simulation and rhythm video games created by Bandai Namco Games (formerly Namco). Its first game premiered in Japan in 2005 as an arcade game, and the series has grown to numerous ports, sequels and spin-offs across multiple video game consoles. Each game in the main series deals with the training of prospective pop idols on their way to stardom. The main talent agency featured in the series is 765 Production, and other studios introduced in later games include 876 Production featured in The Idolmaster Dearly Stars, and 961 Production originally introduced in The Idolmaster SP, but which later returns in The Idolmaster 2.

The games in the series feature a variety of music sung by the idols, many of which are featured in multiple games either initially or as downloadable content (DLC). As of the release of The Idolmaster One For All in May 2014, the series includes an initial setlist of 73 songs, and each game initially contains a limited number of these songs. For example, the arcade version of The Idolmaster contains 10 of these songs, and this is increased to 16 with its Xbox 360 port. Songs initially released on various music albums and singles for the series have also been featured in the games. Starting with The Idolmaster Live For You! in 2008, DLC packs have been released which add to a game's initial setlist of songs. As of June 2015, 66 of the 73 songs have also been released in DLC packs. In addition, there are 43 more songs that are only available in DLC packs, which brings the total number of songs featured in the series to 116 songs. Aside from a few exceptions, none of the songs have set singers—almost all of the songs can be sung by any one of the idols in a given game.

== Initial setlist ==
There are 73 songs initially available across the entire series. There is a large amount of overlap between the songs as many of them are featured in multiple games. In addition to the original versions of these songs, 16 remixes are also included in The Idolmaster Live For You! which have to be unlocked by satisfying certain events in the game. The Idolmaster 2 also features a remix of the song "The Idolmaster", in addition to two songs that also have to be unlocked. The original arcade game has 10 songs, and this is increased to 16 in the Xbox 360 port. Not counting the remix versions, Live For You! contains the same 16 songs from the Xbox 360 port. The three versions of The Idolmaster SP each contain 20 songs, though 17 of them are common to all versions. The Idolmaster Dearly Stars contains 10 songs. The Xbox 360 version of The Idolmaster 2 contains 18 songs, and its PlayStation 3 version contains 23 songs. The three versions of The Idolmaster Shiny Festa each contain 20 songs, though 6 of them are common to all versions. One song is initially available in The Idolmaster Shiny TV. Lastly, The Idolmaster One For All contains 21 songs.

Song list
Song title	The Idolmaster		The Idolmaster Live For You!	The Idolmaster SP			The Idolmaster Dearly Stars	The Idolmaster 2		The Idolmaster Shiny Festa			The Idolmaster Shiny TV	The Idolmaster One For All
Song title	Arcade	Xbox 360	The Idolmaster Live For You!	Perfect Sun	Missing Moon	Wandering Star	The Idolmaster Dearly Stars	Xbox 360	PlayStation 3	Honey Sound / Harmonic Score	Funky Note / Rhythmic Record	Groovy Tune / Melodic Disc	The Idolmaster Shiny TV	The Idolmaster One For All
"9:02pm"	Yes	Yes	Yes + remix^{[A]}^{[U]}	Yes	Yes	Yes	No	No	Download	No	No	No	No	Download
"Acceleration" (アクセルレーション)	No	No	No	No	No	No	No	No	No	No	No	No	No	Limited^{[n 8]}
"Agent Yoru o Yuku" (エージェント夜を往く)	Yes	Yes	Yes + remix^{[A]}^{[U]}	Yes	Yes	Yes	Yes	No	Download	No	No	Yes	Download	Download
"Ai Like Hamburger" (愛 LIKE ハンバーガー)	No	No	No	No	No	No	No	Download	Yes	No	No	No	Download	Download
"Alice or Guilty"	No	No	No	No	No	No	No	Limited^{[n 1]}	Limited^{[n 1]}	No	No	No	No	No
"Alive"	No	No	No	No	No	No	Yes	No	Download^{[n 2]}	No	No	No	Download^{[n 2]}	No
"Alright*"	No	No	No	No	No	No	No	No	No	No	No	Yes	Download	No
"Aoi Tori" (蒼い鳥)	Yes	Yes	Yes + remix^{[A]}^{[U]}	Yes	Yes	Yes	No	No	No	No	No	No	Download	No
"Brand New Day!"	No	No	No	No	No	No	No	Download	Download	No	Yes	No	Download	Yes
"Change!!!!"	No	No	No	No	No	No	No	Download	Download	Yes	Yes	Yes	Download	Yes
"Colorful Days"	No	No	Download	Yes	Yes	Yes	No	Download	Download	No	No	No	Download	Yes
"Dazzling World"	No	No	No	No	No	No	Yes	No	Download^{[n 4]}	No	No	No	Download^{[n 4]}	No
"Destiny"	No	No	No	No	No	No	No	No	No	No	No	No	No	Yes
"Do-Dai"	No	No	Download	Download	Download	Download	No	Yes	Yes	No	Yes	No	Download	No
"edeN"	No	No	No	No	No	No	No	No	No	No	No	Yes	Download	Download
"First Stage"	Yes	Yes	Yes + remix^{[A]}^{[U]}	Yes	Yes	Yes	No	No	No	No	No	No	Download	No
"First Step"	No	No	No	No	No	No	No	Limited^{[n 6]}	Limited^{[n 6]}	No	No	No	No	No
"Furufuru Future☆" (ふるふるフューチャー☆)	No	No	Download	Download	Download	Download	No	No	Download	No	No	Yes	Download	Yes
"Futari no Kioku" (フタリの記憶)	No	No	Download	Download	Download	Yes	No	No	No	No	Yes	No	Download	Yes
"Go My Way!!"	No	Yes	Yes + remix^{[A]}^{[U]}	Yes	Yes	Yes	Yes	Yes	Yes	Yes	No	No	Download	Yes
"Hello!!"	No	No	No	No	No	No	Yes	No	No	No	No	No	No	Download^{[n 10]}
"Here We Go!!"	Yes	Yes	Yes + remix^{[A]}^{[U]}	Yes	Yes	Yes	No	No	No	No	No	No	No	No
"Honey Heartbeat"	No	No	No	No	No	No	No	Download	Yes	No	Yes	No	Download	Download
"I"	No	No	Download	Download	Download	Download	No	Yes	Yes	No	No	No	No	No
"I Want"	No	No	Download	Yes	Download	Download	No	Download	Download	Yes	No	No	Download	Download
"Ippai Ippai" (いっぱいいっぱい)	No	No	Download	Download	Yes	Download	No	No	No	Yes	No	No	Download	Yes
"Jibun Restart" (自分REST@RT)	No	No	No	No	No	No	No	Download	Download	Yes	Yes	Yes	Download	Yes
"Jitensha" (自転車)	No	No	No	No	No	No	No	No	No	No	No	Yes	Download	No
"Kami Summer!!" (神SUMMER!!)	No	No	No	No	No	No	No	Download	Download	Yes	No	No	Download	Download
"Kazahana" (風花)	No	No	No	No	No	No	No	No	No	No	No	Yes	Download	No
"Kimi wa Melody" (キミはメロディ)	No	No	No	Download	Download	Download	No	No	No	No	No	Yes	Download	Download
"Kiramekirari" (キラメキラリ)	No	No	Download	Yes	Download	Download	Yes	Yes	Yes	No	Yes	No	Download	Yes
"Koi o Hajimeyō" (恋をはじめよう)	No	No	No	No	No	No	No	Limited^{[n 1]}	Limited^{[n 1]}	No	No	No	No	No
"Kosmos, Cosmos"	No	No	Download	Download	Download	Yes	No	Yes	Yes	No	No	Yes	Download	Yes
"Kyun! Vampire Girl" (きゅんっ! ヴァンパイアガール)	No	No	No	No	No	No	No	Download	Download	No	Yes	No	Download	Download
"Little Match Girl"	No	No	No	No	No	No	No	Download	Yes	No	No	Yes	Download	Download
"L-O-B-M"	No	No	No	Download	Download	Download	No	Download	Download	No	Yes	No	Download	Download
"Lo♥ve♥ly" (ラ♥ブ♥リ♥)	No	No	No	No	No	No	No	No	No	Yes	No	No	Download	No
"Mahō o Kakete!" (魔法をかけて!)	Yes	Yes	Yes + remix^{[A]}^{[U]}	Yes	Yes	Yes	No	No	Download	Yes	No	No	Download	Download
"Marionette no Kokoro" (マリオネットの心)	No	No	No	No	No	No	No	Download	Download	No	No	Yes	Download	Download
"Massugu" (まっすぐ)	No	Yes	Yes + remix^{[A]}^{[U]}	Yes	Yes	Yes	No	No	No	No	No	Yes	Download	No
"Masterpiece"	No	No	No	No	No	No	No	No	No	No	No	No	No	Yes
"Me ga Au Toki" (目が逢う瞬間)	No	No	Download	Download	Yes	Download	No	Yes	Yes	Yes	No	No	Download	Yes
"Megare!"	No	No	No	No	No	No	No	Yes	Yes	No	No	No	Download	Download
"Meisō Mind" (迷走Mind)	No	No	Download	Yes	Download	Download	No	Yes	Yes	No	No	Yes	Download	Yes
"Music♪"	No	No	No	No	No	No	No	No	No	Yes	Yes	Yes	Download	Download
"My Best Friend"	No	Yes	Yes + remix^{[A]}^{[U]}	Yes	Yes	Yes	No	Yes	Yes	No	No	No	No	Yes
"My Song"	No	No	Download	Download	Download	Download	No	Yes	Yes	No	No	No	Download	Download
"Nanairo Button" (七彩ボタン)	No	No	No	No	No	No	No	No	Yes^{[U]}	No	Yes	No	Download	Download
"Next Life"	No	No	No	No	No	No	No	No	No	No	Yes	No	Download	No
"Ohayō!! Asagohan" (おはよう!! 朝ご飯)	Yes	Yes	Yes + remix^{[A]}^{[U]}	Yes	Yes	Yes	No	No	No	No	Yes	No	Download	No
"Omoide o Arigatō" (思い出をありがとう)	No	Yes	Yes + remix^{[A]}^{[U]}	Yes	Yes	Yes	No	No	Download	No	No	No	No	Download
"Only My Note"	No	No	No	No	No	No	No	No	No	No	No	No	No	Yes
"Otome yo Taishi o Idake!!" (乙女よ大志を抱け!!)	No	No	No	No	No	No	No	No	No	Yes	No	No	Download	No
"Overmaster" (オーバーマスター)	No	No	No	Download	Download	Download	No	Download	Download	No	No	Yes	Download	Download
"Positive!" (ポジティブ!)	Yes	Yes	Yes + remix^{[A]}^{[U]}	Yes	Yes	Yes	No	No	Download	No	Yes	No	Download	Download
"Precog" (プリコグ)	No	No	No	No	No	No	Yes	No	Download^{[n 3]}	No	No	No	Download^{[n 3]}	No
"Ready!!"	No	No	No	No	No	No	No	No	Yes	Yes	Yes	Yes	Download	Yes
"Relations"	No	Yes	Yes + remix^{[A]}^{[U]}	Yes	Yes	Yes	Yes	Yes	Yes	No	No	Yes	Download	Download
"Shalala" (シャララ)	No	No	No	No	No	No	No	No	No	Yes	No	No	Download	No
"Shiny Smile"	No	No	Download	Download	Download	Download	Yes	Yes	Yes	Yes	No	No	Download	Download
"Smoky Thrill"	No	No	No	No	No	No	No	Yes^{[U]}	Yes^{[U]}	No	Yes	No	Download	Download
"Start Star" (スタ→トスタ→)	No	No	Download	Download	Download	Yes	No	No	No	No	Yes	No	Download	Yes
"Taiyō no Jealousy" (太陽のジェラシー)	Yes	Yes	Yes + remix^{[A]}^{[U]}	Yes	Yes	Yes	No	No	No	No	No	No	Download	No
"The Idolmaster"	Yes	Yes	Yes + remix^{[A]}^{[U]}	Yes	Yes	Yes	Yes	Yes^{[C]}	Yes^{[C]}	Yes	Yes	Yes	Download	Download^{[C]}
"The World is All One!!"	No	No	No	No	No	No	No	Yes	Yes	Download	Download	Download	Download	Yes
"Tonari ni..." (隣に…)	No	No	Download	Download	Yes	Download	No	No	No	Yes	No	No	Download	Yes
"Vault That Borderline!"	No	No	No	No	No	No	No	No	No	Yes	No	No	Download	Download
"Visionary" (ビジョナリー)	No	No	No	No	No	No	No	No	No	No	Yes	No	Download	Download
"Watashi wa Idol♡" (私はアイドル♡)	No	Yes	Yes + remix^{[A]}^{[U]}	Yes	Yes	Yes	No	No	Download	Yes	No	No	Download	Download
"Watashitachi wa Zutto...Deshō?" (私たちはずっと…でしょう?)	No	No	No	No	No	No	No	Download	Download	Yes	Yes	Yes	Download	Download
"We Have A Dream"	No	No	No	No	No	No	No	No	No	No	No	No	Yes	Download
"Yakusoku" (約束)	No	No	No	No	No	No	No	No	No	Yes	No	No	Download	No

== Downloadable content ==
Starting with The Idolmaster Live For You! in 2008, downloadable content (DLC) packs have been released which add to a game's initial setlist of songs. The packs are available either through the Xbox Live Marketplace or the PlayStation Store depending on the game. As of June 2015, 109 songs, including various remixes, have been released in DLC packs, 66 of which are also initially available in one of the games in the series. This includes "The World is All One!!", which is available for The Idolmaster Shiny Festa via a product code contained in the limited edition of the three game versions. The remaining 43 songs are only available in DLC packs.

=== From the initial setlist ===
Song list
Song title	The Idolmaster Live For You!	The Idolmaster SP	The Idolmaster 2		The Idolmaster Shiny TV	The Idolmaster One For All	Download pack and release date
Song title	The Idolmaster Live For You!	The Idolmaster SP	Xbox 360	PlayStation 3	The Idolmaster Shiny TV	The Idolmaster One For All	Download pack and release date
"9:02pm"	Yes^{[B]}	Yes^{[B]}	No	Yes	No	Yes	Live For You! catalog 1 – February 27, 2008; SP catalog 15 – April 28, 2010; The Idolmaster 2 PS3 catalog 17 – April 24, 2013; One For All catalog 14 – June 24, 2015
"Agent Yoru o Yuku" (エージェント夜を往く)	Yes^{[B]}	Yes^{[B]}	No	Yes	Yes	Yes	Live For You! catalog 1 – February 27, 2008; SP catalog 16 – May 26, 2010; The Idolmaster 2 PS3 catalog 14 – November 29, 2012; Shiny TV mini album 12 – February 19, 2014; One For All catalog 14 – June 24, 2015
"Ai Like Hamburger" (愛 LIKE ハンバーガー)	No	No	Yes	No	Yes	Yes	The Idolmaster 2 X360 catalog 3 – April 27, 2011; Shiny TV mini album 2 – October 2, 2013; One For All catalog 13 – May 26, 2015
"Alive"	No	No	No	Limited^{[n 2]}	Limited^{[n 2]}	No	The Idolmaster 2 PS3 catalog 3 – December 22, 2011; Shiny TV mini album 10 – January 22, 2014
"Alright*"	No	No	No	No	Yes	No	Shiny TV mini album 7 – December 4, 2013
"Aoi Tori" (蒼い鳥)	Yes^{[B]}	Yes^{[B]}	No	No	Yes	No	Live For You! catalog 1 – February 27, 2008; SP catalog 14 – March 31, 2010; Shiny TV mini album 4 – October 23, 2013
"Brand New Day!"	No	No	Yes	Yes	Yes	No	The Idolmaster 2 X360 catalog 13 – February 29, 2012; The Idolmaster 2 PS3 catalog 5 – February 29, 2012; Shiny TV mini album 5 – November 6, 2013
"Change!!!!"	No	No	Yes	Yes	Yes	No	The Idolmaster 2 X360 catalog 12 – January 31, 2012; The Idolmaster 2 PS3 catalog 4 – January 31, 2012; Shiny TV mini album 3 – October 9, 2013
"Colorful Days"	Yes + remixes^{[A]}^{[B]}	No	Yes	Yes	Yes	No	Live For You! catalog 12 – March 24, 2009 (original); Live For You! catalog 17 – August 25, 2009 (remixes); The Idolmaster 2 X360 catalog 6 – July 28, 2011; The Idolmaster 2 PS3 catalog 10 – August 1, 2012; Shiny TV mini album 6 – November 20, 2013
"Dazzling World"	No	No	No	Limited^{[n 4]}	Limited^{[n 4]}	No	The Idolmaster 2 PS3 catalog 7 – April 26, 2012; Shiny TV mini album 9 – January 9, 2014
"Do-Dai"	Yes + remixes^{[A]}^{[B]}	Yes + remix^{[B]}	No	No	Yes	No	Live For You! catalog 3 – April 29, 2008 (original); Live For You! catalog 8 – September 22, 2008 (Remix-A); Live For You! catalog 9 – October 28, 2008 (Remix-B); SP catalog 6 – July 15, 2009 (original); SP catalog 17 – June 30, 2010 (remix); Shiny TV mini album 11 – February 5, 2014
"edeN"	No	No	No	No	Yes	Yes	Shiny TV mini album 12 – February 19, 2014; One For All catalog 10 – February 25, 2015
"First Stage"	Yes^{[B]}	Yes^{[B]}	No	No	Yes	No	Live For You! catalog 1 – February 27, 2008; SP catalog 14 – March 31, 2010; Shiny TV mini album 7 – December 4, 2013
"Furufuru Future☆" (ふるふるフューチャー☆)	Yes	Yes	No	Yes	Yes	No	Live For You! catalog 7 – August 26, 2008; SP catalog 5 – June 10, 2009; The Idolmaster 2 PS3 catalog 12 – September 26, 2012; Shiny TV mini album 6 – November 20, 2013
"Futari no Kioku" (フタリの記憶)	Yes	Yes	No	No	Yes	No	Live For You! catalog 13 – April 28, 2009; SP catalog 1 – February 19, 2009; SP catalog 4 – May 13, 2009; Shiny TV mini album 8 – December 18, 2013
"Go My Way!!"	Yes^{[B]}	Yes^{[B]}	No	No	Yes	No	Live For You! catalog 2 – March 25, 2008; SP catalog 18 – July 28, 2010; Shiny TV mini album 1 – October 2, 2013
"Hello!!"	No	No	No	No	No	Limited^{[n 10]}	One For All catalog 3 – July 29, 2014
"Here We Go!!"	Yes^{[B]}	Yes^{[B]}	No	No	No	No	Live For You! catalog 1 – February 27, 2008; SP catalog 15 – April 28, 2010
"Honey Heartbeat"	No	No	Yes	No	Yes	Yes	The Idolmaster 2 X360 catalog 2 – March 31, 2011; Shiny TV mini album 7 – December 4, 2013; One For All catalog 13 – May 26, 2015
"I"	Yes + remixes^{[A]}^{[B]}	Yes + remix^{[B]}	No	No	No	No	Live For You! catalog 5 – June 24, 2008 (original); Live For You! catalog 11 – December 22, 2008 (remixes); SP catalog 13 – February 24, 2010 (original); SP catalog 17 – June 30, 2010 (remix)
"I Want"	Yes	Yes	Yes	Yes	Yes	Yes	Live For You! catalog 17 – August 25, 2009; SP catalog 3 – April 15, 2009; SP catalog 4 – May 13, 2009; The Idolmaster 2 X360 catalog 7 – August 31, 2011; The Idolmaster 2 PS3 catalog 11 – August 29, 2012; Shiny TV mini album 7 – December 4, 2013; One For All catalog 4 – August 26, 2014
"Ippai Ippai" (いっぱいいっぱい)	Yes	Yes	No	No	Yes	No	Live For You! catalog 13 – April 28, 2009; SP catalog 3 – April 15, 2009; SP catalog 4 – May 13, 2009; Shiny TV mini album 6 – November 20, 2013
"Jibun Restart" (自分REST@RT)	No	No	Yes	Yes	Yes	No	The Idolmaster 2 X360 catalog 10 – November 29, 2011; The Idolmaster 2 PS3 catalog 2 – November 30, 2011; Shiny TV mini album 11 – February 5, 2014
"Jitensha" (自転車)	No	No	No	No	Yes	No	Shiny TV mini album 12 – February 19, 2014
"Kami Summer!!" (神SUMMER!!)	No	No	Yes	Yes	Yes	Yes	The Idolmaster 2 X360 catalog 9 – October 26, 2011; The Idolmaster 2 PS3 catalog 1 – October 27, 2011; Shiny TV mini album 5 – November 6, 2013; One For All catalog 3 – July 29, 2014
"Kazahana" (風花)	No	No	No	No	Yes	No	Shiny TV mini album 5 – November 6, 2013
"Kimi wa Melody" (キミはメロディ)	No	Yes	No	No	Yes	Yes	SP catalog 7 – August 26, 2009; Shiny TV mini album 3 – October 9, 2013; One For All catalog 6 – October 28, 2014
"Kiramekirari" (キラメキラリ)	Yes	Yes	No	No	Yes	No	Live For You! catalog 16 – July 28, 2009; SP catalog 1 – February 19, 2009; SP catalog 4 – May 13, 2009; Shiny TV mini album 2 – October 2, 2013
"Kosmos, Cosmos"	Yes	Yes	No	No	Yes	No	Live For You! catalog 14 – May 26, 2009; SP catalog 3 – April 15, 2009; SP catalog 4 – May 13, 2009; Shiny TV mini album 1 – October 2, 2013
"Kyun! Vampire Girl" (きゅんっ! ヴァンパイアガール)	No	No	Yes	Yes	Yes	Yes	The Idolmaster 2 X360 catalog 4 – May 31, 2011; The Idolmaster 2 PS3 catalog 7 – April 26, 2012; Shiny TV mini album 2 – October 2, 2013; One For All catalog 5 – September 25, 2014
"Little Match Girl"	No	No	Yes	No	Yes	Yes	The Idolmaster 2 X360 catalog 1 – February 23, 2011; Shiny TV mini album 7 – December 4, 2013; One For All catalog 8 – December 25, 2014
"Lo♥ve♥ly" (ラ♥ブ♥リ♥)	No	No	No	No	Yes	No	Shiny TV mini album 10 – January 22, 2014
"L-O-B-M"	No	Yes	Yes	Yes	Yes	Yes	SP catalog 18 – July 28, 2010; The Idolmaster 2 X360 catalog 5 – June 30, 2011; The Idolmaster 2 PS3 catalog 9 – June 28, 2012; Shiny TV mini album 6 – November 20, 2013; One For All catalog 5 – September 25, 2014
"Mahō o Kakete!" (魔法をかけて!)	Yes^{[B]}	Yes^{[B]}	No	Yes	Yes	Yes	Live For You! catalog 1 – February 27, 2008; SP catalog 16 – May 26, 2010; The Idolmaster 2 PS3 catalog 13 – October 31, 2012; Shiny TV mini album 9 – January 9, 2014; One For All catalog 6 – October 28, 2014
"Marionette no Kokoro" (マリオネットの心)	No	No	Yes	Yes	Yes	Yes	The Idolmaster 2 X360 catalog 11 – December 22, 2011; The Idolmaster 2 PS3 catalog 3 – December 22, 2011; Shiny TV mini album 9 – January 9, 2014; One For All catalog 7 – November 25, 2014
"Massugu" (まっすぐ)	Yes^{[B]}	Yes^{[B]}	No	No	Yes	No	Live For You! catalog 2 – March 25, 2008; SP catalog 18 – July 28, 2010; Shiny TV mini album 10 – January 22, 2014
"Me ga Au Toki" (目が逢う瞬間)	Yes	Yes	No	No	Yes	No	Live For You! catalog 16 – July 28, 2009; SP catalog 1 – February 19, 2009; SP catalog 4 – May 13, 2009; Shiny TV mini album 4 – October 23, 2013
"Megare!"	No	No	No	No	Yes	Yes	Shiny TV mini album 5 – November 6, 2013; One For All catalog 2 – June 25, 2014
"Meisō Mind" (迷走Mind)	Yes	Yes	No	No	Yes	No	Live For You! catalog 15 – June 23, 2009; SP catalog 2 – March 11, 2009; SP catalog 4 – May 13, 2009; Shiny TV mini album 8 – December 18, 2013
"Music♪"	No	No	No	No	Yes	Yes	Shiny TV mini album 1 – October 2, 2013; One For All catalog 12 – April 28, 2015
"My Best Friend"	Yes^{[B]}	Yes^{[B]}	No	No	No	No	Live For You! catalog 2 – March 25, 2008; SP catalog 18 – July 28, 2010
"My Song"	Yes + remixes^{[A]}^{[B]}	Yes + remix^{[B]}	No	No	Yes	Yes	Live For You! catalog 4 – May 27, 2008 (original); Live For You! catalog 8 – September 22, 2008 (Remix-A); Live For You! catalog 9 – October 28, 2008 (Remix-B); SP catalog 8 – September 30, 2009 (original); SP catalog 17 – June 30, 2010 (remix); Shiny TV mini album 8 – December 18, 2013; One For All catalog 5 – September 25, 2014
"Nanairo Button" (七彩ボタン)	No	No	No	No	Yes	Yes	Shiny TV mini album 12 – February 19, 2014; One For All catalog 3 – July 29, 2014
"Next Life"	No	No	No	No	Yes	No	Shiny TV mini album 3 – October 9, 2013
"Ohayō!! Asagohan" (おはよう!! 朝ご飯)	Yes^{[B]}	Yes^{[B]}	No	No	Yes	No	Live For You! catalog 1 – February 27, 2008; SP catalog 15 – April 28, 2010; Shiny TV mini album 4 – October 23, 2013
"Omoide o Arigatō" (思い出をありがとう)	Yes^{[B]}	Yes^{[B]}	No	Yes	No	Yes	Live For You! catalog 2 – March 25, 2008; SP catalog 18 – July 28, 2010; The Idolmaster 2 PS3 catalog 16 – February 20, 2013; One For All catalog 14 – June 24, 2015
"Otome yo Taishi o Idake!!" (乙女よ大志を抱け!!)	No	No	No	No	Yes	No	Shiny TV mini album 1 – October 2, 2013
"Overmaster" (オーバーマスター)	No	Yes	Yes	Yes	Yes	Yes	SP catalog 12 – January 27, 2010; The Idolmaster 2 X360 catalog 8 – September 29, 2011; The Idolmaster 2 PS3 catalog 8 – May 31, 2012; Shiny TV mini album 3 – October 9, 2013; One For All catalog 2 – June 25, 2014
"Positive!" (ポジティブ!)	Yes^{[B]}	Yes^{[B]}	No	Yes	Yes	Yes	Live For You! catalog 1 – February 27, 2008; SP catalog 16 – May 26, 2010; The Idolmaster 2 PS3 catalog 18 – June 26, 2013; Shiny TV mini album 11 – February 5, 2014; One For All catalog 3 – July 29, 2014
"Precog" (プリコグ)	No	No	No	Limited^{[n 3]}	Limited^{[n 3]}	No	The Idolmaster 2 PS3 catalog 5 – February 29, 2012; Shiny TV mini album 11 – February 5, 2014
"Ready!!"	No	No	No	No	Yes	No	Shiny TV mini album 2 – October 2, 2013
"Relations"	Yes^{[B]}	Yes^{[B]}	No	No	Yes	Yes	Live For You! catalog 1 – February 27, 2008; SP catalog 15 – April 28, 2010; Shiny TV mini album 6 – November 20, 2013; One For All catalog 7 – November 25, 2014
"Shalala" (シャララ)	No	No	No	No	Yes	No	Shiny TV mini album 11 – February 5, 2014
"Shiny Smile"	Yes + remixes^{[A]}^{[B]}	Yes + remix^{[B]}	No	No	Yes	Yes	Live For You! catalog 11 – December 22, 2008; SP catalog 9 – October 28, 2009 (original); SP catalog 17 – June 30, 2010 (remix); Shiny TV mini album 4 – October 23, 2013; One For All catalog 13 – May 26, 2015
"Smoky Thrill"	No	No	No	No	Yes	Yes	Shiny TV mini album 5 – November 6, 2013; One For All catalog 13 – May 26, 2015
"Start Star" (スタ→トスタ→)	Yes	Yes	No	No	Yes	No	Live For You! catalog 15 – June 23, 2009; SP catalog 2 – March 11, 2009; SP catalog 4 – May 13, 2009; Shiny TV mini album 10 – January 22, 2014
"Taiyō no Jealousy" (太陽のジェラシー)	Yes^{[B]}	Yes^{[B]}	No	No	Yes	No	Live For You! catalog 1 – February 27, 2008; SP catalog 14 – March 31, 2010; Shiny TV mini album 1 – October 2, 2013
"The Idolmaster"	Yes^{[B]}	Yes^{[B]}	No	No	Yes	Yes^{[C]}	Live For You! catalog 2 – March 25, 2008; SP catalog 14 – March 31, 2010; Shiny TV mini album 9 – January 9, 2014; One For All catalog 14 – June 24, 2015
"The World is All One!!"	No	No	No	No	Yes	No	Shiny TV mini album 12 – February 19, 2014
"Tonari ni..." (隣に…)	Yes	Yes	No	No	Yes	No	Live For You! catalog 14 – May 26, 2009; SP catalog 2 – March 11, 2009; SP catalog 4 – May 13, 2009; Shiny TV mini album 10 – January 22, 2014
"Vault That Borderline!"	No	No	No	No	Yes	Yes	Shiny TV mini album 9 – January 9, 2014; One For All catalog 4 – August 26, 2014
"Visionary" (ビジョナリー)	No	No	No	No	Yes	Yes	Shiny TV mini album 8 – December 18, 2013; One For All catalog 8 – December 25, 2014
"Watashi wa Idol♡" (私はアイドル♡)	Yes^{[B]}	Yes^{[B]}	No	Yes	Yes	Yes	Live For You! catalog 2 – March 25, 2008; SP catalog 16 – May 26, 2010; The Idolmaster 2 PS3 catalog 15 – December 20, 2012; Shiny TV mini album 8 – December 18, 2013; One For All catalog 4 – August 26, 2014
"Watashitachi wa Zutto...Deshō?" (私たちはずっと…でしょう?)	No	No	Yes	Yes	Yes	Yes	The Idolmaster 2 X360 catalog 14 – March 29, 2012; The Idolmaster 2 PS3 catalog 6 – March 29, 2012; Shiny TV mini album 4 – October 23, 2013; One For All catalog 4 – August 26, 2014
"We Have A Dream"	No	No	No	No	No	Yes	One For All catalog 9 – January 29, 2015
"Yakusoku" (約束)	No	No	No	No	Yes	No	Shiny TV mini album 2 – October 2, 2013

=== Download-only songs ===
Song list
Song title	The Idolmaster Live For You!	The Idolmaster SP	The Idolmaster 2		The Idolmaster Shiny TV	The Idolmaster One For All	Download pack and release date
Song title	The Idolmaster Live For You!	The Idolmaster SP	Xbox 360	PlayStation 3	The Idolmaster Shiny TV	The Idolmaster One For All	Download pack and release date
"99 Nights"	No	No	No	No	No	Yes	One For All catalog 5 – September 25, 2014
"Ano Hi no Namida" (あの日のナミダ)	No	No	No	No	No	Limited^{[n 6]}	One For All catalog 4 – August 26, 2014
"Anzu no Uta" (あんずのうた)	No	No	No	No	No	Limited^{[n 11]}	One For All catalog 4 – August 26, 2014
"Arcadia"	No	No	No	No	Yes	No	Shiny TV bonus 1 – November 20, 2013
"Dream"	No	No	No	No	No	Yes	One For All catalog 1 – May 15, 2014
"Fate of the World"	No	No	No	No	No	Yes	One For All catalog 6 – October 28, 2014
"Futatsu no Tsuki" (ふたつの月)	No	No	No	No	No	Limited^{[n 12]}	One For All catalog 4 – August 26, 2014
"Good-Byes"	No	No	No	No	No	Yes	One For All catalog 11 – March 25, 2015
"Happy Lucky Jet Machine" (ハッピー☆ラッキー☆ジェットマシーン)	No	No	No	No	No	Limited^{[n 24]}	One For All catalog 5 – September 25, 2014
"Hōkago Jump" (放課後ジャンプ)	No	No	No	No	No	Limited^{[n 13]}	One For All catalog 4 – August 26, 2014
"Kami-sama no Birthday" (神さまのBirthday)	Yes	Yes	Yes	Yes	No	Yes	Live For You! catalog 10 – November 25, 2008; SP catalog 11 – December 22, 2009; The Idolmaster 2 X360 catalog 10 – November 29, 2011; The Idolmaster 2 PS3 catalog 2 – November 30, 2011; One For All catalog 7 – November 25, 2014
"Kimi * Channel" (キミ＊チャンネル)	No	No	No	No	No	Yes	One For All catalog 2 – June 25, 2014
"Koi Kaze" (こいかぜ)	No	No	No	No	No	Limited^{[n 32]}	One For All catalog 12 – April 28, 2015
"Koi Kokoro" (コイ・ココロ)	No	No	No	No	No	Limited^{[n 14]}	One For All catalog 4 – August 26, 2014
"Koi no Lesson Shokyūhen" (恋のLesson初級編)	No	No	No	No	No	Limited^{[n 28]}	One For All catalog 8 – December 25, 2014
"Machiuke Prince" (待ち受けプリンス)	No	No	No	No	Yes	Yes	Shiny TV mini album 1 – October 2, 2013; Shiny TV mini album 2 – October 2, 2013; Shiny TV mini album 3 – October 9, 2013; Shiny TV mini album 4 – October 23, 2013; Shiny TV mini album 5 – November 6, 2013; Shiny TV mini album 6 – November 20, 2013; Shiny TV mini album 7 – December 4, 2013; Shiny TV mini album 8 – December 18, 2013; Shiny TV mini album 9 – January 9, 2014; Shiny TV mini album 10 – January 22, 2014; Shiny TV mini album 11 – February 5, 2014; Shiny TV mini album 12 – February 19, 2014; One For All catalog 3 – July 29, 2014
"Mata ne" (またね)	No	Yes	No	No	Yes	Yes	SP catalog 10 – November 25, 2009; Shiny TV mini album 3 – October 9, 2013; One For All catalog 6 – October 28, 2014
"Melt" (メルト)	No	No	No	Limited^{[n 5]}	No	No	The Idolmaster 2 PS3 catalog 4 – January 31, 2012
"Mitsuboshi☆☆★" (ミツボシ☆☆★)	No	No	No	No	No	Limited^{[n 31]}	One For All catalog 11 – March 25, 2015
"Never say never"	No	No	No	No	No	Limited^{[n 30]}	One For All catalog 10 – February 25, 2015
"Nostalgia"	No	No	No	No	No	Limited^{[n 15]}	One For All catalog 4 – August 26, 2014
"Onegai! Cinderella" (お願い!シンデレラ)	No	No	No	No	No	Limited^{[n 33]}	One For All catalog 14 – June 24, 2015
"Original Goe ni Natte" (オリジナル声になって)	No	No	No	No	No	Limited^{[n 25]}	One For All catalog 5 – September 25, 2014
"Pla Sonic Love!" (プブ・ソニック・ラブ!)	No	No	No	No	No	Limited^{[n 16]}	One For All catalog 4 – August 26, 2014
"Pon De Beach"	No	No	No	No	No	Limited^{[n 17]}	One For All catalog 4 – August 26, 2014
"Precious Grain"	No	No	No	No	No	Limited^{[n 27]}	One For All catalog 7 – November 25, 2014
"Ramuneiro Seishun" (ラムネ色 青春)	No	No	No	No	No	Yes	One For All catalog 3 – July 29, 2014
"Saihyō" (細氷)	No	No	No	No	No	Limited^{[n 18]}	One For All catalog 4 – August 26, 2014
"Shizuka na Yoru ni Negai o" (静かな夜に願いを・・・)	No	No	No	No	No	Yes	One For All catalog 7 – November 25, 2014
"S(mile)ing!"	No	No	No	No	No	Limited^{[n 29]}	One For All catalog 9 – January 29, 2015
"Sora" (空)	No	No	No	No	Yes	No	Shiny TV bonus 2 – February 19, 2014
"Star!!"	No	No	No	No	No	Limited^{[n 33]}	One For All catalog 13 – May 26, 2015
"Suteki Happiness" (ステキハピネス)	No	No	No	No	No	Limited^{[n 19]}	One For All catalog 4 – August 26, 2014
"Suteki na Kiseki" (素敵なキセキ)	No	No	No	No	No	Limited^{[n 26]}	One For All catalog 6 – October 28, 2014
"Thank You!"	No	No	No	No	No	Yes	One For All catalog 5 – September 25, 2014
"Tokimeki no Onpu ni Natte" (トキメキの音符になって)	No	No	No	No	No	Limited^{[n 9]}	One For All catalog 2 – June 25, 2014
"Triple Angel" (トリプルAngel)	No	No	No	No	No	Limited^{[n 20]}	One For All catalog 4 – August 26, 2014
"Tsubomi Yumemiru Rapsodia (Alma no Michibiki)" (華蕾夢ミル狂詩曲～魂ノ導～)	No	No	No	No	No	Limited^{[n 7]}	One For All catalog 1 – May 15, 2014
"Ultimate Eyes" (アルティメットアイズ)	No	No	No	No	No	Limited^{[n 8]}	One For All catalog 8 – December 25, 2014
"Watashi datte Onna no Ko" (私だって女の子)	No	No	No	No	No	Limited^{[n 21]}	One For All catalog 4 – August 26, 2014
"World is Mine" (ワールドイズマイン)	No	No	No	Limited^{[n 5]}	No	No	The Idolmaster 2 PS3 catalog 1 – October 27, 2011
"Zekken, Arui wa Nigerarenu Koi" (絶険、あるいは逃げられぬ恋)	No	No	No	No	No	Limited^{[n 22]}	One For All catalog 4 – August 26, 2014
"Zenryoku Idol" (全力アイドル)	No	No	No	No	No	Limited^{[n 23]}	One For All catalog 4 – August 26, 2014

== Notes ==
^{A} Remix-A
^{B} Remix-B
^{C} 2nd-mix
^{U} The song must be unlocked

1. ^{1} ^{2} ^{3} ^{4} The song is limited to being sung by the all-male idol group Jupiter.
2. ^{1} ^{2} ^{3} ^{4} The song is limited to being sung by Ai Hidaka.
3. ^{1} ^{2} ^{3} ^{4} The song is limited to being sung by Eri Mizutani.
4. ^{1} ^{2} ^{3} ^{4} The song is limited to being sung by Ryō Akizuki.
5. ^{1} ^{2} The song is limited to being sung by Hatsune Miku.
6. ^{1} ^{2} ^{3} The song is limited to being sung by Yukiho Hagiwara.
7. ^{1} The song is limited to being sung by Ranko Kanzaki.
8. ^{1} ^{2} The song is limited to being sung by Leon.
9. ^{1} The song is limited to being sung by Serika Hakozaki.
10. ^{1} ^{2} The song is limited to being sung by the idol unit Dearly Stars made up of Ai Hidaka, Eri Mizutani and Ryō Akizuki.
11. ^{1} The song is limited to being sung by Anzu Futaba.
12. ^{1} The song is limited to being sung by Takane Shijō.
13. ^{1} The song is limited to being sung by Mami Futami.
14. ^{1} The song is limited to being sung by Azusa Miura.
15. ^{1} The song is limited to being sung by Miki Hoshii.
16. ^{1} The song is limited to being sung by Yayoi Takatsuki.
17. ^{1} The song is limited to being sung by Hibiki Ganaha.
18. ^{1} The song is limited to being sung by Chihaya Kisaragi.
19. ^{1} The song is limited to being sung by Haruka Amami.
20. ^{1} The song is limited to being sung by Ami Futami.
21. ^{1} The song is limited to being sung by Ritsuko Akizuki.
22. ^{1} The song is limited to being sung by Makoto Kikuchi.
23. ^{1} The song is limited to being sung by Iori Minase.
24. ^{1} The song is limited to being sung by Nao Yokoyama.
25. ^{1} The song is limited to being sung by Kana Yabuki.
26. ^{1} The song is limited to being sung by Mirai Kasuga.
27. ^{1} The song is limited to being sung by Shizuka Mogami.
28. ^{1} The song is limited to being sung by Tsubasa Ibuki.
29. ^{1} The song is limited to being sung by Uzuki Shimamura.
30. ^{1} The song is limited to being sung by Rin Shibuya.
31. ^{1} The song is limited to being sung by Mio Honda.
32. ^{1} The song is limited to being sung by Kaede Takagaki.
33. ^{1} ^{2} The song is limited to being sung by an idol unit made up of Uzuki Shimamura, Rin Shibuya and Mio Honda.
