= List of songs recorded by Liberty X =

Liberty X have recorded 67 songs which were composed by either the band or external songwriters.

== Released ==
	Year	Song^{A}	Album/Single
1	2006	A Holy Night	A Night To Remember (Single)
2	2005	A Night To Remember; Main Version; Radio Edit; Full Length Version; Methods of Flow Club Mix	X A Night To Remember (Single)
3	2004	Before It's Goodbye	Holding on For You (Single)
4	2003	Being Nobody; Album Version; Main Mix; Richard X Remix; X-Strumental; Richard X X-Strumental; 2006 Mix	Being Somebody; Being Nobody (Single); X
5	2004	Being Somebody	Being Somebody
6	2002	Breathe	Just A Little (Single)
7	2005	Bump & Grind	
8	2006	Close Your Eyes	X
9	2006	Dirty Cash	X
10	2006	Divine Intervention	X
11	2001	Doin' It; Album Version; Kool De Sac Club Mix Edit; The Wideboys Radio Mix; Sleazesisters Anthem Edit; The Wideboys Club Mix; Blacksmith R&B Rub; DC Joseph Main Mix; DC Joseph Instrumental; Kool De Sac Full Club Mix; Original Mix; Sleazesisters Anthem Full Mix; K Boy's Konstruction Mix	Thinking It Over; Doin' It (Single)
12	2002	Dream About It	Thinking It Over
13	2004	Enemy	Everybody Cries (Single)
14	2004	Everybody Cries; Album Version; Radio Edit; Bimbo Jones Mix; Bimbo Jones Edit; Bimbo Jones Vocal; Bimbo Jones Dub; Wookie Mix	Being Somebody; Everybody Cries (Single)
15	2006	Everybody Dance; Album Version; Radio Edit; Full Length Version	X A Night To Remember (Single)
16	2002	Everyday	Thinking It Over
17	2002	Everything	Got To Have Your Love (Single)
18	2002	Feel The Rush	Thinking It Over
19	2004	Forever	Being Somebody
20	2004	Fresh	Fresh (Single)
21	2005	Get Away	
22	2002	Get With You	Got To Have Your Love (Single)
23	2002	Good Love	Got To Have Your Love (Single)
24	2002	Got To Have Your Love; Album Version; Single Version; Jam & Faces Vamp Mix; Harry's 3 Way Action Mix; Shanghai Surprise Mix; 2006 Mix; Harry's Afro Hut Mix; Jam & Faces 4 The Floor Mix; Peter Parker Mix; Peter Parker With Rap Mix	Thinking It Over; Got To Have Your Love (Single); X
25	2001	Greed; Album Version; Alternative Version	Thinking It Over (Single); To Those Who Wait
26	2002	Holding on For You; Album Version; Single Version; Double R Remix; Brooks Hold Tight Mix; Mickey P & Ralph Alternative Mix; Double R Instrumental; 2006 Mix; B&Q Remix; Alternative Version	Thinking It Over; Holding on For You (Single); Super Hits; To Those Who Wait; X
27	2002	I Got What You Want	Thinking It Over
28	2004	I Just Wanna	Being Somebody
29	2004	I'll Be Remembering	Being Somebody
30	2004	Impossible	Being Somebody
31	2006	In My Bed	X
32	2003	It Helps	Jumpin' (Single)
33	2006	It's OK	X
34	2003	Jumpin; Album Version; Original Version; JD Remix; DND Remix; The American Desi Mix; Shanghai Surprise Mix; Groove Collision Mix	Being Somebody; Jumpin' (Single)
35	2002	Just A Little; Album Version; Demo Version; Bump & Flex Electro Shock Club Mix; Almighty Mix; Bump & Flex Radio Edit; Radio 1 Remix; 2006 Mix	Thinking It Over; Just A Little (Single); Got To Have Your Love (Single); X
36	2004	Let Go	Being Somebody
37	2001	Let's Get Working	Thinking It Over (Single)
38	2004	Maybe	Being Somebody
39	2001	Meant To Be	Doin' It (Single)
40	2006	Move Ya Body	X
41	2002	Never Give Up	Thinking It Over
42	2001	Never Meant To Say Goodbye; Album Version; Remix	To Those Who Wait; Jumpin' (Single)
43	2001	No Clouds; Album Version; Demo Version	Thinking It Over; Thinking It Over (Single)
44	2001	Practise What You Preach	To Those Who Wait
45	2005	Press Rewind	
46	2001	Right Here, Right Now	Thinking It Over
47	2002	Saturday	Thinking It Over
48	2003	Shake It	Jumpin' (Single)
49	2002	Shut Up & Dance	Holding on For You (Single)
50	2006	Shotgun	X
51	2002	So Alive	Holding on For You (Single)
52	2005	Song For Lovers; Album Version; Radio Edit; Full Length Version; Fray Urban Mix; Solaris 12" Club Mix; Red Rhythm Urban Mix; Extended Radio Edit	X Song For Lovers (Single)
53	2004	Story of My Life	Being Somebody
54	2004	Sunshine	Everybody Cries (Single)
55	2004	Take Me Home	Being Somebody
56	2004	Tell Me What You're Doing Tonight	Being Somebody (Japanese Version)
57	2004	The Last Goodbye	Being Somebody
58	2004	The Poet	Being Somebody
59	2006	Then There Was You	X
60	2001	Thinking It Over; Album Version; Full Length Version; Pete Deveraux & The Wideboys Club Vocal Remix; The Wideboys Remix; Almighty 7" Mix; Kinky Boy Remix Edit; Radio 1 Acoustic Session; The Wideboys Featuring Fat Jack & Miss Shorty Remix; Kinky Boy Full Remix	Thinking It Over; Thinking It Over (Single); Just A Little (Single)
61	2002	Wanting Me Tonight; Album Version; Wookie Full Vocal Mix	Thinking It Over; Just A Little (Single)
62	2004	Watcha' Doin' Tonight	Being Somebody
63	2004	Where Do We Go From Here?	Being Somebody
64	2005	Wilder	
65	2004	Willing To Try	Being Somebody (Japanese Version)
66	2006	X Album Version; Main Radio Edit; Short Radio Edit; Brooklyn Heights Mix	X X (Single)
67	2005	Yo DJ	X

== Notes ==
The following tracks were not released in the UK.

- Super Hits – "Holding on For You" (B&Q Remix)
- Unreleased Third V2 Album – "Wilder", "Get Away", "Press Rewind" and "Bump & Grind"
- To Those Who Wait – "Practice What You Preach", "Greed" (Alternative Version) and "Holding on For You" (Alternative Version)
- Being Somebody (Japanese Version) – * "Tell Me What You're Doing Tonight" and "Willing To Try"
- The Hits: Reloaded – "Fresh"
