= List of songs written by Audie Murphy =

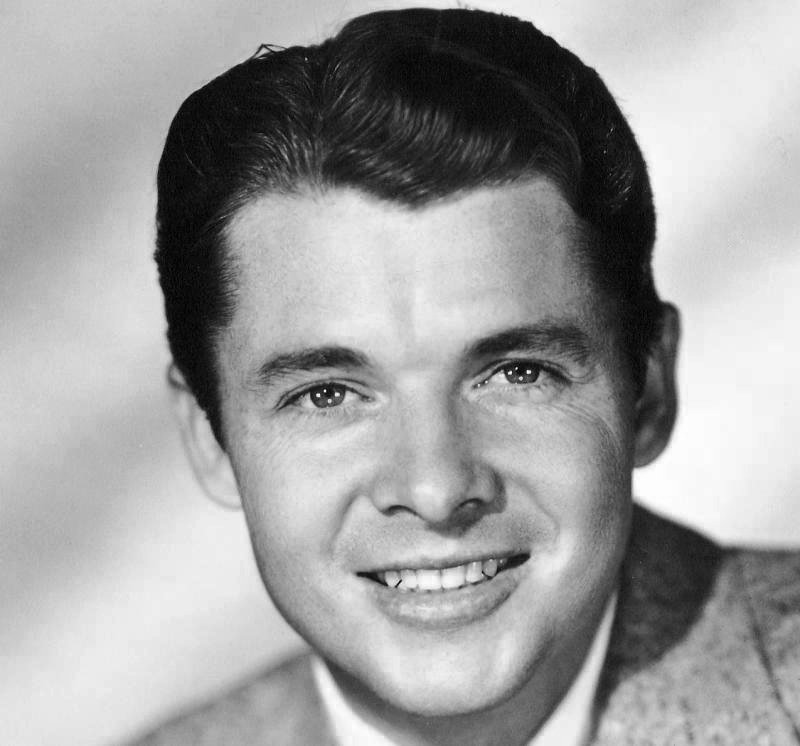
Audie Murphy

Audie Murphy (1925–1971) was born into a poor family in Texas and became a highly decorated American soldier who served with the United States Army in nine campaigns in Europe from 1942 to 1945. He was the recipient of the Medal of Honor for his combat heroism in World War II and received every American combat award for valor available from the Army at the time of his service. (Note: Murphy's war service was combat-related. Therefore, he did not receive the non-combat Soldier's Medal. Act of Congress (Public Law 446–69th Congress, 2 July 1926 (44 Stat. 780)) established the Soldier's Medal for heroism "as defined in 10 USC 101(d), at the time of the heroic act who distinguished himself or herself by heroism not involving actual combat with the enemy." At the end of his World War II service, Murphy became known as America's most decorated soldier.) At the onset of the Korean War, he was commissioned as an officer in the Texas National Guard and served with the Guard for sixteen years before retiring from military service. His home state posthumously awarded him the Texas Legislative Medal of Honor for his combined service in the Army and the Guard.

Murphy's two-decade acting career spanned radio, television, and over 40 films. (Note: The exact count on the number of feature films Murphy made varies by source. The Hollywood Walk of Fame and other sources put his total number of feature films at 44. Verifiable sources, however, exist for 45 films, and IMDb has recently added a 46th film, Rock 'Em Cowboy (1958).) He was a collaborator on several songs between 1962 and 1970. His listening music of choice was country, and he had a natural talent for writing poetry. One of his better-known poems is "The Crosses Grow on Anzio" which appears in To Hell and Back attributed to a soldier named Kerrigan. Combined, his taste in music and his poetic skill with rhyming and pentameter surfaced in the songs he wrote. All of his songs but the last one were written in partnership with Scott Turner. As a musician in the pop and country music genres, Turner had become acquainted with Murphy through mutual friend Guy Mitchell. Their biggest hit was "Shutters and Boards", written at Murphy's ranch in 1962. The song is a man's lament over a failed relationship and the boarding up of the home they shared. The Billboard review of Jerry Wallace's recording of the tune noted, "War hero, movie star Audie Murphy is co-writer on this western-style weeper, which has a solid story lyric." In the early 1970s, Turner said that the song had been recorded by approximately sixty vocalists in multiple languages.

"When the Wind Blows in Chicago" was another top hit written by Murphy and Turner in 1962. Born out of a casual comment Murphy had made one evening when they were listening to the howling wind outside his California home, it was recorded by Dean Martin, Eddy Arnold, Porter Wagoner and other country music singers.

Twelve of their songs were written by just Murphy and Turner, although others also worked with them at times. Guy Mitchell joined them in writing two 1963 songs, "My Lonesome Room" recorded by Roy Clark and "The Only Light I Ever Need is You" for Jerry Wallace, and later Harry Nilsson. Murphy and Turner collaborated with Coy Ziegler on two songs for Jerry Wallace, "Big, Big Day Tomorrow" in 1964 and "Round and Round She Goes" in 1965. Jimmy Bryant (as Ivy J. Bryant) worked with them as both songwriter and singer in 1966 on "Rattle Dance". "Was It All Worth Losing You" co-written with Terri Eddleman in 1970 was the last song Murphy wrote. Charley Pride recorded the song for his album The Incomparable Charley Pride.

Murphy's poem "Freedom Flies in Your Heart Like an Eagle" was contained within a speech he wrote for the 20 July 1968 dedication of the Alabama War Memorial in Montgomery. Turner set the poem to music, using its first three words as the song title "Dusty Old Helmet", but it was not recorded. The contractual relationship of Murphy and Turner split the royalties equally, and in their personal lives their respective families had close ties. One of the last known photographs of Murphy is with Turner at the Country Music Hall of Fame.

== Songs ==
The following was compiled from Appendex Four in the book Audie Murphy, American Soldier by Harold B. Simpson, the U.S. Copyright Office, and other sources as noted.

| Title | Year | Lyricist | Composer | Publisher | Recorded by | Refs |
|---|---|---|---|---|---|---|
| "Shutters and Boards" | 1962 | Audie Murphy and Scott Turner | Scott Turner | Camp and Canyon Music; assigned to Vogue Music Inc. 1966 | Numerous artists, including Jerry Wallace, Dean Martin, Porter Wagoner, Jimmy Dean, Johnny Mann Singers, and Teresa Brewer | |
| "When the Wind Blows in Chicago" | 1962 | Audie Murphy and Scott Turner | Scott Turner | Irving Music Inc. | Bobby Bare, Roy Clark, Eddy Arnold, Jerry Wallace, Vic Dana and others | |
| "Please Mr. Music Man Play a Song for Me" | 1962 | Audie Murphy and Scott Turner | Scott Turner | Scott Turner Music | Harry Nilsson and Dick Contino | |
| "Leave the Weeping to the Willow Tree" | 1962 | Audie Murphy and Scott Turner | Scott Turner | Irving Music Inc. | Bonnie Guitar | |
| "Go On and Break My Heart" | 1963 | Audie Murphy and Scott Turner | Scott Turner | Irving Music Inc. | Wilton and Welcon | |
| "Willie the Hummer" | 1963 | Audie Murphy and Scott Turner | Scott Turner | Scott Turner Music | Jerry Wallace | |
| "My Lonesome Room" | 1963 | Audie Murphy, Guy Mitchell and Scott Turner | Scott Turner | Central Songs | Roy Clark | |
| ""The Only Light I Ever Need is You" | 1963 | Audie Murphy, Guy Mitchell and Scott Turner | Scott Turner | 4 Star | Jerry Wallace (not released) and Harry Nilsson | |
| "Foolish Clock" | 1964 | Audie Murphy and Scott Turner | Scott Turner | Irving Music Inc | Harry Nilsson | |
| "Shortcut to Nowhere" | 1964 | Audie Murphy and Scott Turner | Scott Turner | Irving Music Inc | Dorsey Burnette (not released) | (Note: Simpson lists this as "If There is a Shortcut to Nowhere (I'll take it)" but the U.S. Copyright Office shows the shortened title.) |
| "Pedro's Guitar" | 1964 | Audie Murphy and Scott Turner | | Central Songs | Jimmy Bryant | |
| "Big, Big Day Tomorrow" | 1964 | Audie Murphy, Coy Ziegler and Scott Turner | Scott Turner | Central Songs | Jerry Wallace (unreleased) | |
| "Elena, Goodbye" | 1964 | | Audie Murphy and Scott Turner | Central Songs | Jimmy Bryant | |
| "Old Heartaches is Laughing at Me" | 1964 | Audie Murphy and Scott Turner | | | | (Note: Not part of Simpson's list, but registered at the U.S. Copyright Office.) |
| "Round and Round She Goes" | 1965 | Audie Murphy, Coy Ziegler and Scott Turner | Scott Turner | Central Songs | Jerry Wallace | |
| "Rattle Dance" | 1966 | | Audie Murphy, Scott Turner and Ivy J. Bryant | Central Songs | Jimmy Bryant | |
| "Dusty Old Helmet" | 1969 | Audie Murphy | Scott Turner | Music Machine Music | | |
| "Was It All Worth Losing You" | 1970 | Audie Murphy | Terri Eddleman | Pi-Gem Publishing Co., Inc. | Charley Pride | |
