= Lists of music by theme =

The following lists classify music and songs by theme

== Songs about a topic ==
- List of songs about abortion
- List of songs about animal rights
- List of songs about anti-war
- List of songs about bicycles
- List of songs about child abuse
- List of songs about the Cold War
- List of songs about nuclear war and weapons
- List of songs about school
- List of songs about the September 11 attacks
- List of songs about the Vietnam War
- List of songs about trains

== Songs about people ==
- List of songs about or referencing Adolf Hitler
- List of songs about or referencing Donald Trump
- List of songs about or referencing Syd Barrett
- List of songs about or referencing serial killers

== Songs about countries or regions ==
- List of songs about Mexico
- List of songs about Ohio
- List of songs about Oklahoma
- List of songs about Pakistan
- List of songs about Puerto Rico

== Songs about a city ==
- List of songs about cities
- List of songs about Alabama
- List of songs about Amsterdam
- List of songs about Atlanta
- List of songs about Berlin
- List of songs about Birmingham
- List of songs about Birmingham, Alabama
- List of songs about Boston
- List of songs about Chicago
- List of songs about Copenhagen
- List of songs about Delhi
- List of songs about Detroit
- List of songs about Dublin
- List of songs about Hamburg
- List of songs about Houston
- List of songs about Jerusalem
- List of songs about Kolkata
- List of songs about Liverpool
- List of songs about London
- List of songs about Louth
- List of songs about Manchester
- List of songs about Manila
- List of songs about Melbourne
- List of songs about Miami
- List of songs about Moscow
- List of songs about Mumbai
- List of songs about Nashville, Tennessee
- List of songs about New Orleans
- List of songs about New York City
- List of songs about Paris
- List of songs about Portland, Oregon
- List of songs about Rio de Janeiro
- List of songs about Seattle
- List of songs about Stockholm
- List of songs about Sydney
- List of songs about Tipperary
- List of songs about Tokyo
- List of songs about Toronto
- List of songs about Vancouver

== See also ==
- Lists of music inspired by literature
