= The Pink Floyd and Syd Barrett Story =

BBC 2001 TV documentary

- Directed by: John Edginton
- Starring: Pink Floyd, Roger Waters, Peter Jenner, Bob Klose
- Narrated by: Kirsty Wark
- Music by: Pink Floyd, Syd Barrett
- Original language: English

Production
- Executive producer: Basil Comely
- Producer: John Edginton
- Editor: Ray Frawley
- Running time: 60 min
- Production company: Otmoor Productions

Original release
- Network: BBC Two
- Release: 24 November 2001

Related
- VH1 Legends: Pink Floyd & Syd Barrett

The Pink Floyd and Syd Barrett Story is a 2001 television documentary produced by Otmoor Productions for BBC Two's Omnibus series and originally called Syd Barrett: Crazy Diamond (in the US, a slightly modified version aired as Pink Floyd & Syd Barrett in the VH1 Legends series in January 2002). Directed by John Edginton, the film includes interviews with all the Pink Floyd members – Roger Waters, David Gilmour, Nick Mason and Richard Wright – plus the "fifth Pink Floyd", Bob Klose, who left the band in 1965, getting their points of view on the original band founder Syd Barrett. The film includes rare early television appearances of Pink Floyd, and home movies.

The film was first released on DVD on 24 March 2003. In 2021, the director and archivist, John Edginton, retrieved the original interview tapes and released them in full on his YouTube channel in a playlist/podcast titled Pink Floyd Interviews.

== Plot ==
The focus of the film is Syd Barrett, the lead vocalist and guitarist of the early Pink Floyd, who created their unique psychedelic sound and most of the band's early songs, including the singles "Arnold Layne" and "See Emily Play" and much of their first album The Piper at the Gates of Dawn.

Barrett's name passed into rock folklore when he was kicked out of Pink Floyd in 1968 and, after two solo albums, disappeared from music altogether amid rumours of a drug-induced breakdown.

The Pink Floyd and Syd Barrett Story has contributions from Humble Pie drummer Jerry Shirley (who played on Barrett's two solo albums The Madcap Laughs and Barrett as well as Barrett's final London concert on 6 June 1970 with David Gilmour, when Barrett abruptly left the stage after playing only four numbers), bassist Jack Monck who played at Barrett's last public concert in 1972 at the Cambridge Corn Exchange, producer Joe Boyd who produced "Arnold Layne", photographer Mick Rock who photographed Barrett for The Madcap Laughs cover, and artist Duggie Fields who shared an apartment in London's Earls Court with Barrett in 1968 and witnessed his changing mental state at close hand.

== Reception ==
According to The Observer, Barrett watched the documentary at his sister's house when it was broadcast on the BBC. He apparently found it "too loud", although he did enjoy seeing Mike Leonard, whom he referred to as his "teacher". He also enjoyed hearing "See Emily Play" again. However, in 2024, Barrett's sister denied this.

== Certifications ==
Region	Certification	Certified units/sales
Canada (Music Canada)	Gold	5,000^{^}
United Kingdom (BPI)	Platinum	50,000^{*}
^{*} Sales figures based on certification alone.^{^} Shipments figures based on certification alone.
