= Lists of music inspired by literature =

This is a list of articles, or subsections of articles, about music inspired by literature.

- Musical settings of, or music inspired by, poems by Byron
- Edgar Allan Poe and music
- Music related to Anne Rice's novels
- Works inspired by J. R. R. Tolkien
- Music based on the works of Oscar Wilde
- List of songs based on poems
- List of songs based on literary works
- Romeo and Juliet (Prokofiev)
- A Midsummer Night's Dream (Mendelssohn)

== See also ==
- Lists of music by theme
