= Lord Byron in popular culture =

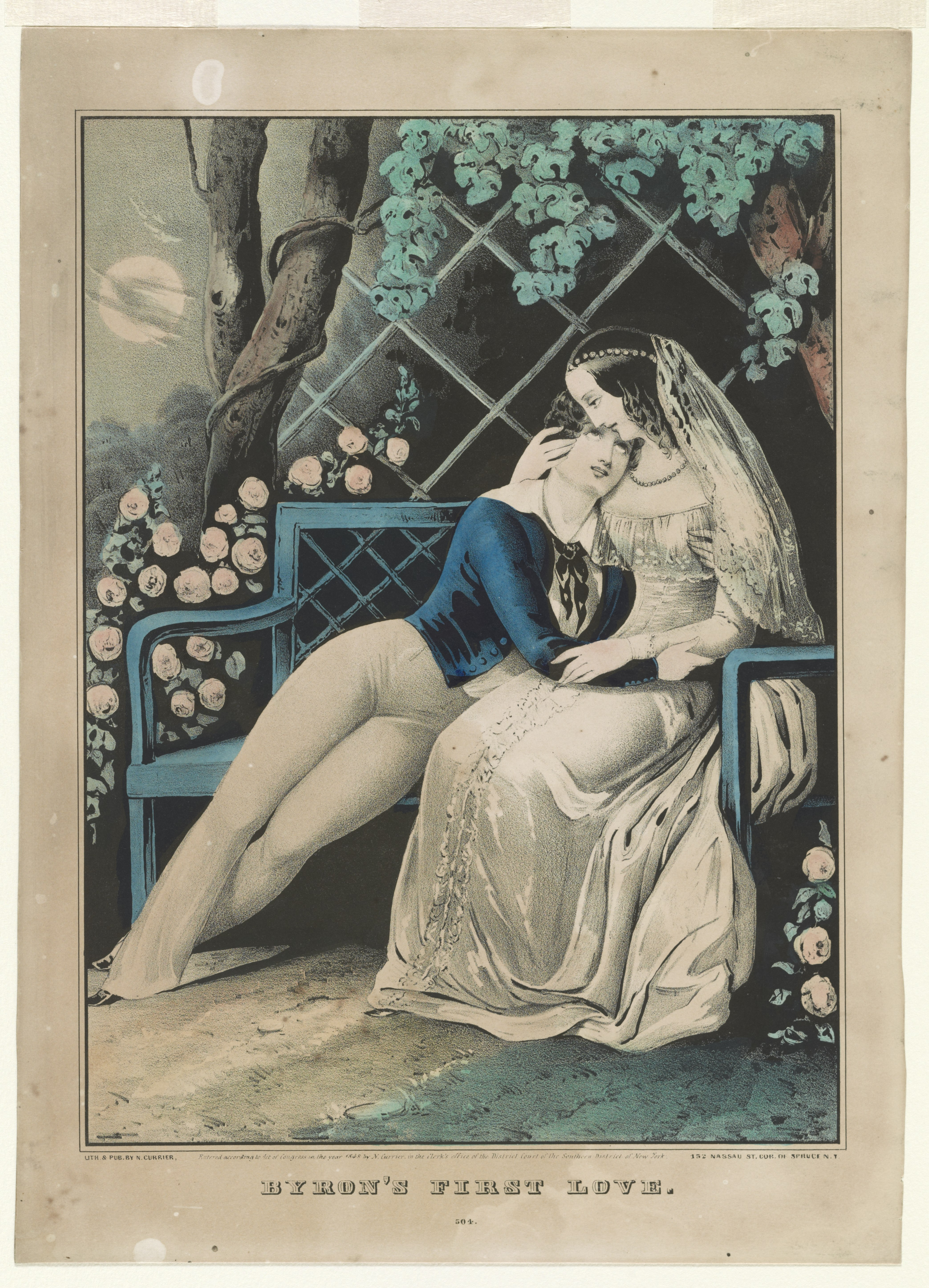
"Byron's First Love", an 1848 illustration

English writer Lord Byron has been mentioned in numerous media. A few examples of his appearances in literature, film, music, television and theatre are listed below.

== Literature ==
Byron first appeared as a thinly disguised character in Glenarvon, by his former lover Lady Caroline Lamb, published in 1816. She described him as "mad, bad, and dangerous to know".

The Spanish poet Gaspar Núñez de Arce wrote Última lamentación de Lord Byron (The last lamentation of Lord Byron), a long soliloquy on the miseries of the world, the existence of a superior, omnipotent being, politics, etc.

Mary Shelley's apocalyptic novel The Last Man acts as a roman à clef for several members of her coterie including in its cast Adrian, Earl of Windsor as a tribute to Percy Bysshe Shelley and his friend, Lord Raymond, who is a distinct portrait of Byron, noted as being "an adventurer in the Greek wars."

Novelist Benjamin Markovits produced a trilogy about the life of Byron. Imposture (2007) looked at the poet from the point of view of his friend and doctor, John Polidori. A Quiet Adjustment (2008), is an account of Byron's marriage that is more sympathetic to his wife, Annabella. Childish Loves (2011) is a reimagining of Byron's lost memoirs, dealing with questions about his childhood and sexual awakening.

=== Poetry ===
Letitia Elizabeth Landon, who was referred to as the female Byron, wrote (published posthumously) on Byron in her poetical illustration to The Portrait of Lord Byron, at Newstead Abbey, by Richard Westall, Fisher's Drawing Room Scrap Book, 1840 See also Lines Suggested on Visiting Newstead Abbey. from Fisher's Drawing Room Scrap Book, 1839.

Lawrence Durrell wrote a poem called Byron as a lyrical soliloquy; it was first published in 1944.

Susanna Roxman's Allegra in her 1996 collection Broken Angels (Dionysia Press, Edinburgh) is a poem about Byron's daughter by Claire Clairmont. In this text, Byron is referred to as "Papa".

=== Vampire figures ===
Tom Holland, in his 1995 novel The Vampyre: Being the True Pilgrimage of George Gordon, Sixth Lord Byron, describes how Lord Byron became a vampire during his first visit to Greece — a fictional transformation that explains much of his subsequent behaviour towards family and friends, and finds support in quotes from Byron poems and the diaries of John Cam Hobhouse. It is written as though Byron is retelling part of his life to his great great-great-great-granddaughter. He describes travelling in Greece, Italy, Switzerland, meeting Percy Bysshe Shelley, Shelley's death, and many other events in life around that time. Byron as vampire character returns in the 1996 sequel Supping with Panthers.

Byron is depicted as the villain/antagonist in the novel Jane Bites Back (2009) written by Michael Thomas Ford, published by Ballantine Books. A novel based on the premise that Jane Austen and Lord Byron are vampires living in the modern day literary world.

Dan Chapman's 2010 vampire novella The Postmodern Malady of Dr. Peter Hudson begins at the time of Lord Byron's death and uses biographical information about him in the construction of its title character. It also directly quotes some of his work.

=== Lost manuscripts ===
John Crowley's book Lord Byron's Novel: The Evening Land (2005) involves the rediscovery of a lost manuscript by Lord Byron, as do Frederic Prokosch's The Missolonghi Manuscript (1968), The Secret Memoir of Lord Byron by Christopher Nicole (1979) and Robert Nye's Memoirs of Lord Byron (1989). The Black Drama by Manly Wade Wellman, originally published in Weird Tales, involves the rediscovery and production of a lost play by Byron (from which Polidori's The Vampyre was plagiarised) by a man who purports to be a descendant of the poet.

== Film ==
Byron was portrayed by George Beranger in Beau Brummel (1924).

The brief prologue to Bride of Frankenstein includes Gavin Gordon as Byron, begging Mary Shelley to tell the rest of her Frankenstein story.

Byron, Percy and Mary Shelley are portrayed in Roger Corman's final film Frankenstein Unbound, where the time traveller Dr. Buchanan (played by John Hurt) meets them as well as Victor von Frankenstein (played by Raúl Juliá).

The events featuring the Shelleys' and Byron's relationship at the house beside Lake Geneva in 1816 have been fictionalised in film at least four times.

1. A 1986 British production, Gothic, directed by Ken Russell and starring Gabriel Byrne as Byron.
2. A 1988 Spanish production, Rowing with the wind aka (Remando al viento), directed by Gonzalo Suárez and starring Hugh Grant as Byron.
3. A 1988 U.S.A. production Haunted Summer. Adapted by Lewis John Carlino from the speculative novel by Anne Edwards, starring Philip Anglim as Lord Byron.
4. A 2017 U.K. production Mary Shelley directed by Haifaa al-Mansour featuring Tom Sturridge as Byron.

Byron was mentioned by Sir Humphrey Pengallan (played by Charles Laughton) in Jamaica Inn (1939).

The Bad Lord Byron (1949) starred Dennis Price as the poet in a sanitised biopic of his life.

Byron was portrayed by Noel Willman in Beau Brummell (1954).

Byron's affair with Lady Caroline Lamb features in the 1972 film Lady Caroline Lamb. Byron is played by Richard Chamberlain.

Byron is the main character of the film Byron, balanta gia enan daimonismeno (Byron, Ballad for a possessed, 1992), by the Greek filmmaker Nikos Koundouros.

== Music ==
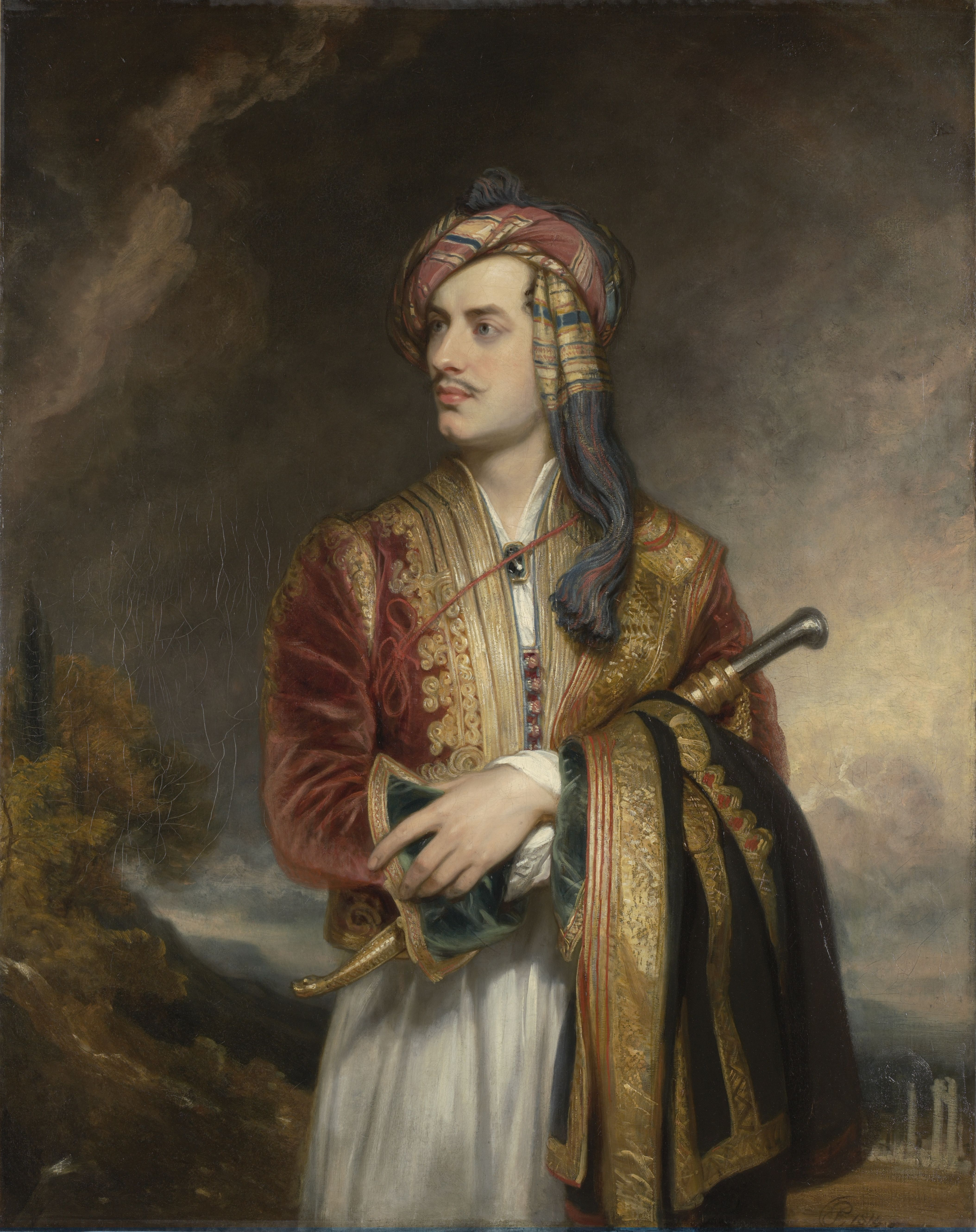
Lord Byron in Albanian Dress by Thomas Phillips, 1813

- 1820 – William Crathern: My Boat is On the Shore (1820), a setting for voice and piano of words from the poem To Thomas More written by Byron in 1817
- c. 1820–1860 – Carl Loewe: 24 songs
- 1833 – Gaetano Donizetti: Parisina, opera
- 1834 – Hector Berlioz: Harold en Italie, symphony in four movements for viola and orchestra
- 1835 – Gaetano Donizetti: Marino Faliero, opera
- 1844 – Hector Berlioz: Le corsaire overture (possibly also inspired by James Fenimore Cooper's Red Rover as the original title is Le Corsaire Rouge)
- 1844 – Giuseppe Verdi: I due Foscari, opera in three acts
- 1848 – Giuseppe Verdi: Il corsaro, opera in three acts
- 1849 – Robert Schumann: Overture and incidental music to Manfred
- 1849–54 – Franz Liszt: Tasso, Lamento e trionfo, symphonic poem
- 1885 – Pyotr Ilyich Tchaikovsky: Manfred Symphony in B minor, Op. 58
- 1896 – Hugo Wolf: Vier Gedichte nach Heine, Shakespeare und Lord Byron for voice and piano: 3. Sonne der Schlummerlosen 4. Keine gleicht von allen Schönen
- 1916 – Pietro Mascagni: Parisina, opera in four acts
- 1921 - Charles Ives: "The Incantation" for voice and piano
- 1934 – Germaine Tailleferre: Two Poems of Lord Byron (1. Sometimes in moments... 2. 'Tis Done I heard it in my dreams... for Voice and Piano (Tailleferre's only setting of English language texts)
- 1942 – Arnold Schoenberg: Ode to Napoleon for reciter, string quartet and piano
- mid-1970s: Arion Quinn: She Walks in Beauty
- 1984 – David Bowie: Music video for Blue Jean and short promotional video for Blue Jean, Jazzin' for Blue Jean features him playing a rock star named Screaming Lord Byron (cf. Screaming Lord Sutch). His attire for the rock star mimics that of Lord Byron's in the portrait by Thomas Phillips.
- 1994 - Suede: She Walks in Beauty is referred in the Dog Man Star album track "Heroine".
- 1997 – Solefald: When the Moon is on the Wave
- 1998 – Slapp Happy: Ça Va, "The Unborn Byron"
- 2002 – Ariella Uliano: So We'll Go No More A'Roving
- 2002 – Warren Zevon: Lord Byron's Luggage
- 2004 – Leonard Cohen: Go No More A-Roving
- 2006 – Kris Delmhorst: We'll Go No More A-Roving
- 2006 – Cradle Of Filth: The Byronic Man featuring HIM's Ville Valo
- 2008 – ALPHA 60: The rock, the vulture, and the chain
- 2008 – Schiller (band) has a song called "Nacht" with Ben Becker on its album, Sehnsucht (Schiller album), has video on Youtube. The lyrics are a shortened version of a poem in German called Die Seele that is attributed to Lord Byron. It appears to be a translation of the Byron poem, "When coldness wraps this suffering clay" from the collection, Hebrew Melodies. The Identity of the translator/author of Die Seele is unknown although the text may be from "Lord Byrons Werke In sechs Bänden", translated by Otto Gildemeister, 3rd Volume, Fifth Edition, Berlin 1903 (pages 134–135).
- 2011 – Agustí Charles: Lord Byron. Un estiu sense estiu. Opera en dos actes (Lord Byron. A summer without a summer. Opera in two actes). Libretto in Catalan by Marc Rosich, world premiere at Staatstheater Darmstadt, March 2011.
- 2012 – Norwegian black metal band Dødsengel used Byron's poem Darkness in their album Imperator, on the song Darkness.
- 2020 - The Finnish symphonic metal band Nightwish used some of Byron's poetry on their album Human :|: Nature.
- 2021 - British singer Marianne Faithfull's final studio album 'She Walks In Beauty' recorded with Australian multi-instrumentalist Warren Ellis sets music and Faithfull's spoken delivery to "She Walks In Beauty" and "So We'll Go No More A Roving".
- 2025 - Irish singer songwriter Tess Callaghan's "Stanzas For Music", setting 10 of Byron's lyric poems from Hebrew Melodies to rock/ pop music. Tracks include "Fame, Wisdom, Love And Power Were Mine", "My Soul Is Dark", "I Breathe Not Your Name", "We'll Go No More A'Roving", "He Walks In Beauty", "None Of Beauty's Daughters", "There Is Pleasure In The Pathless Woods", "When We Parted", "Sun Of The Sleepless", "They Say That Hope Is Happiness". Three videos filmed in Italy accompany the collection.

Perth rock band Eleventh He Reaches London are named in reference to the eleventh canto of Don Juan, in which Don Juan arrives in London. Their debut album, The Good Fight for Harmony also featured a track entitled "What Would Don Juan Do?"

== Television ==
In the third episode of the comedy series Fawlty Towers, The Wedding Party, a character refers to Lord Byron’s promiscuity: ‘I think, beneath that English exterior throbs a passion that would make Lord Byron look like a tobacconist.’

Byron appears as an immortal, still living in modern times, in the television show Highlander: The Series in the fifth-season episode The Modern Prometheus, living as a decadent rock star.

Television portrayals include a 2003 BBC drama on Byron's life (with Jonny Lee Miller in the title role), an appearance in the 2006 BBC drama, Beau Brummell: This Charming Man, and minor appearances in Highlander: The Series (as well as the Shelleys), Blackadder the Third, episode 60 (Darkling) of Star Trek: Voyager, and was also parodied in the animated sketch series, Monkey Dust.

In the CBBC children's television show Horrible Histories and its reboot, Lord Byron was portrayed by Ben Willbond and Richard Atwill, as fat, sweating man who was conscious his appearance and his bizarre choice of animals whom he kept as pets.

Byron appears in the twelfth episode of the fourth season of The Grim Adventures of Billy & Mandy as an ectoplasmic manifestation coming from the mouth of a main character, Billy, where Byron attempts to teach Billy how to be cool using poetry and wit.

In the television series "White Collar," Season 3/Episode 12: "Upper West Side Story," actor Matt Bomer plays con-man/thief-turned-FBI consultant Neal Caffrey, working under cover as substitute English teacher Mr. Cooper. During a class, Mr. Cooper has the class close their books and then recites Lord Byron's poem, "She Walks In Beauty"...

The episode "The Haunting of Villa Diodati" from the twelfth series of Doctor Who centered around Byron, Mary Shelley, and the famous writing contest that led to the creation of Frankenstein.

Byron is portrayed by Mathew Baynton in Season 2 Episode 4 of Drunk History

In an episode of Ghosts, a film about Byron's life is being filmed, to the despair of the ghost of Romantic poet Thomas Thorne (Matthew Baynton), who claims Byron was his rival in life who stole his work.

A snippet of Darkness is quoted in the Adult Swim animated series Primal.

Byron is named in Season 4, Episode 5 of Downton Abbey by the Dowager Countess of Grantham as means of disavowing the notion of a peer poet, alluding to his bacchante lifestyle and subsequent fate.

== Theatre ==
Byron was the subject of a 1908 play, Byron, by Alicia Ramsey, and its 1922 film adaptation A Prince of Lovers, in which he was played by Howard Gaye.

Tom Stoppard's play Arcadia revolves around a modern researcher's attempts to find out what made Byron leave the country, while Howard Brenton's play Bloody Poetry features Byron, in addition to Polidori, the Shelleys and Claire Clairmont.

Byron is depicted in Tennessee William's play Camino Real.

The play A Year Without A Summer by Brad C. Hodson is about Byron, Polidori, the Shelleys, and Claire Clairmont and the famous summer of 1816 at the Villa Diodati. As opposed to other works dealing with the same period, the play is more a biopic dealing with Byron's divorce and exile from England, than with the Shelleys' lives.

He appears as a drug induced apparition to his dying daughter, Ada, in Romulus Linney's two-act play Childe Byron, premiered in 1977 by the Virginia Museum Theater (now the Leslie Cheek Theater), with Jeremiah Sullivan as Byron and Marjorie Lerstrom as his daughter Ada, Countess Lovelace. The play was commissioned and directed by Keith Fowler.
