= List of songs about Portland, Oregon =

Many songs have been written about the city of Portland, Oregon. A song belongs on the list below only if the song is notably about Portland, although the song may additionally be notable for other reasons too. Therefore, this list does not include notable songs that merely mention Portland in passing.

The city song of Portland, officially adopted in 1989, is Portlandia by Marc C. Miller.

- "Portland's Burning"- Defiance
- "Dream of the 90's" - Carrie Brownstein and Fred Armisen
- "Alameda" - Elliott Smith (1997)
- "By the Banks of the Old Willamette" (1909)
- "City of Roses" - Esperanza Spalding; refers to her childhood days spent in her hometown and the nickname of Portland, Oregon (2012)
- "Everyone Knows Everyone" - The Helio Sequence (2004)
- "I Will Buy You a New Life" - Everclear (1997)
- "Light Rail Coyote" - Sleater Kinney (2002)
- "Night of the Living Rednecks" - Dead Kennedys (1979)
- "On the Portland Picket Line" - Joe Glazer (1966)
- "On the Bus Mall" - The Decemberists (2005)
- "Paul's Song" - M. Ward; lyric "every town is all the same/when you've left your heart in the Portland rain" (2005)
- "Portland" - The Replacements (1997)
- "Portland" - Nerf Herder (2015)
- "Portland" - Cowboy Dinosaur (2020)
- "Portland Girl" - John Callahan (2004)
- "Portland Life" - Cool Nutz (1997)
- "Portland, Oregon" - Loretta Lynn and Jack White of The White Stripes (2004)
- "Portland, Oregon" - Belle and Sebastian (2001)
- "Portland Oregon You're My Home" - Carrie Brownstein (2010)
- "Portland Rain" - Everclear (2006)
- "Portland Song" - Jewel (2010)
- "Portland Town" - Derroll Adams, later performed by Joan Baez, The Kingston Trio, and others (1957)
- "Portland Town" - Heavenly (2025)
- "Portland Water" - Michael Hurley (1991)
- "Portland Woman" - New Riders of the Purple Sage (1969)
- "Portlandia" - Marc C. Miller (1987) (official city song)
- "Ramblin' Blues" - Woody Guthrie (1941)
- "Rose Parade" - Elliott Smith (1997)
- "Sisters of the Road" - Casey Neill (2001)
- "Solid" - The Dandy Warhols; references Old Town (2000)
- "Viva Portland" - Chad Crouch (1997)
- "Williams Avenue" - Quarterflash (1981)

== See also ==
- Music of Oregon
- List of songs about Seattle
