= Jabo Williams =

American songwriter

- Born: possible Jimmie Williams possible 1895 probably Alabama, U.S.
- Died: 1953 or 1954 Birmingham, Alabama, U.S.
- Genres: Boogie-woogie; Blues
- Occupations: Pianist; Singer-songwriter
- Instrument: Piano
- Years active: 1930s
- Label: Paramount

Jabo Williams (possible 1895 – 1953 or 1954) was an American boogie-woogie and blues pianist and songwriter. His total recorded output was a mere eight sides, which included his two best-known "stunningly primitive" songs, "Pratt City Blues" and "Jab's Blues" (1932). Details of his life outside of music are scanty.

== Career ==
It is supposed that Williams, who was African-American, was born in Pratt City, a neighborhood of Birmingham, Alabama, but this is based exclusively on the mention of that location in his recording of "Pratt City Blues". He may have been named Jimmie Williams and may have been born 1895. What is certain is that he relocated to St. Louis, Missouri, and was recommended to Paramount Records by Jesse Johnson, a local record store owner and talent scout. In May 1932, Williams recorded eight tracks in a recording studio in Grafton, Wisconsin, for Paramount. The timing was not fortuitous, as Paramount stopped recording that year and went out of business in 1935. Consequently, Williams's output was limited in both national distribution and the number of records issued. His "Kokomo Blues" followed previous recordings in a similar style with the same refrain, but included the counting line "One and two is three, four and five and six". This partly paved the way for the better-known song "Sweet Home Chicago".

By the late 1940s and early 1950s, some of Williams's tracks were reissued by American Music Records, amongst others. His playing style was somewhat unusual, but such belated recognition failed to unearth Williams, the details of whose life remain a mystery. He was recalled briefly by Henry Townsend, who stated, "I knew him from down on Biddle Street and I played guitar behind him around town". He added that Williams was "an average guy and he was very entertaining ... he disappeared from St. Louis and went down in Arkansas some place. I never knew what the hell happened to him." St. Louis bluesman Joe Dean (1908–1981) also remembered him, from a pool hall in St. Louis with a piano that had regular dances; Williams frequented the place when Dean was in his late teens. According to the researchers Bob Eagle and Eric LeBlanc, Williams reportedly died in Birmingham in 1953 or 1954.

== Discography ==
His total recorded output consists of the tracks "Fat Mama Blues", "House Lady Blues", "Jab's Blues", "Kokomo Blues" Parts 1 and 2, "My Woman Blues", "Polock Blues", and "Pratt City Blues". All were included on the compilation album Boogie Woogie & Barrelhouse Piano, Vol. 1 (1928–1932), issued in 1992 by Document Records.

== See also ==
- List of songs about Birmingham, Alabama
