= List of songs about Vancouver =

- "Bridge Came Tumbling Down" by Stompin' Tom Connors
- Life is a Highway by Tom Cochrane
- "English Bay" by Blue Rodeo
- "Expo '86" by Death Cab For Cutie
- "Expo in BC" by The Spores
- "Fallen Leaves" by Billy Talent
- "Dumptruck" by Blind Melon
- "Summer Wages" by Ian Tyson
- "Vancouver" by Jeff Buckley
- "Main & Broadway' by Cub
- "Northern Touch" by Rascalz ft. Kardinal Offishall, Thrust, Checkmate, Choclair
- "The City You Live in is Ugly" by Young and Sexy
- "The Crawl" by Spirit of the West
- "Vancouver" by Joey Lau
- "Vancouver" by Genesis
- "Vancouver Blues" by Tim Hus
- "Vancouver B.C." by The Smugglers
- "Vancouver Divorce" by Gordon Downie
- "Vancouver Town '71" by Rolf Harris
- "The Vancouver National Anthem" by Matthew Good
- "Pine For The Cedars" by Dan Mangan
- "Vancouver Shakedown" by Nazareth
- "バンクーバー (Vancouver)" by Superfly
- "Wrong Side of the Country" by Old Man Luedecke
- "False Creek Change" and "2010" by Said the Whale
- "Commercial Drive" by The Gruff
- "Black Day in December" by Said the Whale
- "Hell" by Tegan and Sara
- "The Cure" by Tegan and Sara
- "Vancouver, une nuit comme une autre" by Aut'Chose
- "Vancouver" a song and album of the same name by Véronique Sanson
- "Vancouver" (Instrumental) by Violent Femmes
- "Girl from Vancouver" by Svavar Knutur
- "Tropical Rainstorm" by Doug and the Slugs
- "Doldrums" by Elbow
- "Wreck Beach/Totem Park" by The Zolas
- "Effort" by Blue J
- "Timezone" by Blue J
- "Up Granville" by Peach Pit
- "Back To Vancouver" by Funboy Five
- "Vancouver" by Kingfishr
- "Janice STFU" by Drake
