= List of songs about Alabama =

List of songs about the U.S. state Alabama

This is a list of songs written about the U.S. state of Alabama or notable locations in the state:

- "Ala freakin Bama" by Trace Adkins
- "Alabam" by Cowboy Copas
- "Alabama" (State Song) by Julia Tutwiler
- "Alabama" by Neil Young
- "Alabama" by John Coltrane
- "Alabama" by Paper Rival
- "Alabama Alibi" by Wendel Adkins/Lonesome Dogs
- "Alabama Angel" by Cliff Abbott
- "Alabama Blues" by J. B. Lenoir
- "Alabama Boogie" by Hank Mathews
- "Alabama Boogie Boy" by Tex Atchison
- "Alabama Bound" by Huddie Ledbetter aka Lead Belly
- "Alabama Getaway" by Grateful Dead
- "Alabama Jail House" by Rod Morris
- "Alabama Jubilee" by Jack Yellen and George L. Cobb
- "Alabama Lady" by Help Yourself
- "Alabama Lullaby" by The Delmore Brothers
- "Alabama Man" by Earl Scott
- "Alabama Moon" by George Hamilton Green
- "Alabama Moonbeam" by John Lithgow
- "Alabama Pines" by Jason Isbell
- "Alabama Rose" by J. G. Liddicoat
- "Alabama Saturday Night" by Wilf Carter, aka Montana Slim
- "Alabama Saturday Night" by Microwave Dave & the Nukes
- "Alabama Shake" by Gene Summers and the Tom Toms
- "Alabama Shamrock" by The Hackensaw Boys
- "Alabama Shines" by Jerry Fuller
- "Alabama Song" by the Doors
- "Alabama Stomp" by Red Nichols
- "Alabama Stronghand Blues" by Bobby Mizzell
- "Alabama: The Heart Of Dixie" by Sherry Bryce
- "Alabama Waltz" by Hank Williams
- "Alabama Wild Man" by Jerry Reed
- "Alabama Women's Prison Blues" by Wayne Kemp, Mack Vickery
- "All Summer Long" by Kid Rock
- "Bama Breeze" by Jimmy Buffett
- "Bury Me In Dixie" by Riley Green
- "Die For Alabama" by Firekid
- "End of Time" by The Band Perry
- "Flyin' Over Sweet Alabama" by Nikki Hornsby
- "Going To Move To Alabama" by Charley Patton
- "Heart Of Dixie" by Darrell McCall
- "It's Hard to Be Humble (When You're from Alabama)" by Phosphorescent
- "King Cotton" by The Secret Sisters
- "Mississippi Kid" by Lynyrd Skynyrd
- "My Alabama Home" by Cliff Abbott
- "My Home's In Alabama" by Alabama
- "Shout Bamalama" by Wet Willie
- "Stars Fell On Alabama" by Frank Perkins, with lyrics by Mitchell Parish
- "Stars Fell on Alabama" by The Mountain Goats
- "Stars In Alabama" by Jamey Johnson
- "Sweet Home Alabama" by Lynyrd Skynyrd
- "The Three Great Alabama Icons" by Drive-By Truckers
- "Tombigbee River"/"Gumtree Canoe" (1847) by S. S. Steele
- "Tuscaloosa" (aka Old Quadrangle) by Harry Lipson III
- "Walking in the Alabama Rain" by Jim Croce
- "Where I'm From" by Shelby Lynne

== Songs about Birmingham ==
- "Birmingham Bertha" by McKinney's Cotton Pickers
- "Birmingham" by Randy Newman, Tommy Collins, Tommy Roe, Billy Ward, Chuck Berry, Dickie Goodman,
- "Birmingham Blues" by Charlie Daniels, John Lee Hooker,
- "Birmingham Boogie" by Oran 'Hot Lips' Page,
- "Birmingham Breakdown" by Duke Ellington
- "Birmingham Bounce" by Hardrock Gunter, Amos Milburn,
- "Birmingham Daddy" by Gene Autry
- "Birmingham Jail" by Huddie Ledbetter aka Lead Belly, Roy Acuff, Michael Martin Murphey, Johnny Bond, Roy Drusky,
- "Birmingham Lucy" by Bobby Goldsboro
- "Birmingham Mama" by Tony Conn
- "Birmingham Shadows" by Bruce Cockburn
- "Birmingham Tonight" by Delbert McClinton
- "Birmingham's Bounce" by Al Smith
- "Paint Me A Birmingham" by Tracy Lawrence
- "Birmingham" by Drive By Truckers
- "Tuxedo Junction" by Erskine Hawkins
- "Birmingham" by Amanda Marshall
- "Postmarked Birmingham" by Blackhawk (band)
- "Birmingham" by Randy Newman
- "Noctifer Birmingham" by The Mountain Goats
- "Birmingham" by Shovels & Rope
- "Birmingham" by Zach Bryan

== Songs about Mobile ==
- "Guitar Man" by Jerry Reed, Elvis Presley
- "Let It Rock" by Chuck Berry
- "Mobile" by Robert Wells and David Holt
- "Mobile, Alabama" by Curtis Gordon
- "Mobile, Alabama Blues" by Milton Brown
- "Mobile Bay" by Dave Kirby, Curley Putman
- "On Mobile Bay" by Dan Hornsby
- "Mobile Bay Magnolia Blossoms" by Dave Kirby, Curley Putman,
- "Mobile Blues" by Mickey Newbury
- "Mobile Boogie" by The Delmore Brothers
- "Mobile Serenade Polka" by Tim Eriksen
- "Stuck Inside of Mobile with the Memphis Blues Again" by Bob Dylan
- "Mobile" by Mike West
- "Mobile" by The Mountain Goats

== Songs about Huntsville ==
- "Huntsville Forever!" by The Guy Who Sings Songs About Cities & Towns (Matt Farley)
- "Hunstville Lights" by Bobby Brooks
- "Huntsville Rock 'n Twist" by Rex Hairston
- "Puttin' People On The Moon" by Drive-by Truckers
- "Rocket City Ditty" by MC AC The Rap Lady

== Songs about Montgomery ==
- "Alabama Nova" by The Mountain Goats
- "Angel from Montgomery" by John Prine
- "Midnight in Montgomery" by Alan Jackson
- "Montgomery County Breakdown" by Eddie Stubbs
- "Montgomery In The Rain" by Stephen Young
- "Montgomery To Memphis" by Billy Montana
- "Seven Bridges Road" by Steve Young

== Songs about Tuscaloosa ==
- "April 29, 1992" by Sublime
- "Flaggin' the Train to Tuscaloosa" by Mack David and Raymond Scott
- "My Tuscaloosa Heart", by Ken Jenkins
- "Tuscaloosa" by Harry Lipson
- "Tuscaloosa Blues" by Al Harris
- "Tuscaloosa From Alabama" by Cindy Walker
- "Tuscaloosa Lucy" by Whitey Pullen
- "Tuscaloosa Waltz" by Lew Childre, Wade Ray
- "Tuscaloosa Women" by The Stampeders
- "Tuscaloosa Yo Yo Man" by Ritchie Adams
- "Waiting Around to Die" Townes Van Zandt
