= Mad, Bad and Dangerous to Know =

Mad, Bad and Dangerous to Know may refer to:

- "Mad, bad, and dangerous to know", a phrase used by Lady Caroline Lamb (1785–1828) to describe her lover Lord Byron
- Mad, Bad and Dangerous to Know (Dead or Alive album), 1986
- Mad, Bad and Dangerous to Know (EP by Joolz Denby with New Model Army), 1986
- Mad, Bad, and Dangerous to Know (The Cross album), 1990
- "Mad, Bad & Dangerous to Know", a 2005 song by Blue Tears from Mad, Bad and Dangerous
- Mad, Bad and Dangerous to Know, a 2008 book by Ranulph Fiennes
- Mad, Bad, Dangerous to Know: The Fathers of Wilde, Yeats and Joyce, a 2018 book by Colm Tóibín
- Mad, Bad & Dangerous to Know, a 2020 novel by Samira Ahmed

== See also ==
- Mad, Bad and Dangerous?: The Scientist and the Cinema, a 2005 book by Christopher Frayling
- A Mad, Bad, and Dangerous People?: England 1783–1846, a 2006 book by Boyd Hilton
