= List of songs about Mexico =

A number of songs are about Mexico. Here is a list of songs about Mexico as a whole, and in other sections, about specific Mexican States. The list contains songs from various genres, including country music, hip hop, rock and folk music.

== Mexico as a whole ==
- "Adios Mexico" by Texas Tornados
- "Ain't no God in Mexico" by Waylon Jennings
- "Alejandro" by Lady Gaga
- "Angelo" by Brotherhood of Man
- "Are you with me" by Lost Frequencies
- "Bay of Mexico" by The Kingston Trio
- "Beer in Mexico" by Kenny Chesney
- "Cuando Volveras a Mexico" by Juan Gabriel
- "De Mexico el Autentico" by Cartel de Santa
- "The Devil in Mexico" by Murder by Death
- "Down in Mexico" by The Coasters
- "Down into Mexico" by Delbert McClinton
- "Down to Mexico" by Paul Gilbert
- "Earthquakes and Sharks" by Brandston
- "Fiesta Mexicana" by Rex Gildo
- "Messico e nuvole" by Enzo Jannacci
- "Germans in Mexico" by Electric Six
- "Going to Mexico" by Steve Miller Band
- "Gulf of Mexico" by Shawn Mullins
- "Highwayman" by Beseech
- "Hoy me voy para Mexico" by Menudo
- "I've got Mexico" by Eddy Raven
- "In Old Mexico" by Tom Lehrer
- "Just Like Mexico" by Don Cisco
- "Long way to Mexico" by Roger Creager
- "Mexican Divorce" by The Drifters
- "Mexican Minutes" by Brooks & Dunn
- "Mexican Girl" by Smokie
- "Mexican Moon" by Concrete Blonde
- "Mexican Sky" by Cross Canadian Ragweed
- "Mexicano" by Barrio Zumba
- "Mexico" by Alestorm
- "Mexico" by Böhse Onkelz
- "Mexico" by Carrie Underwood
- "Mexico" by Chris Holsten
- "Mexico" by Luis Mariano
- "Mexico" by James Taylor
- "Mexico" by Lee Dorsey
- "Mexico" by Incubus
- "Mexico" by Cake
- "Mexico" by Ricardo Arjona
- "Mexico" by Hombres G
- "Mexico" by Timbiriche
- "Mexico" by Grupo Niche
- "Mexico" by Laura Marling
- "Mexico" by Dave Moisan
- "Mexico" by Leona Naess
- "Mexico" by The Staves
- "Mexico" by Carbon Leaf
- "Mexico" by Firefall
- "Mexico" by Raz B
- "Mexico" by Gill Landry
- "Mexico" by Brandston
- "Mexico" by Nazareth
- "Mexico" by Mundy
- "Mexico" by Kain
- "Mexico" by Motel Motel
- "Mexico" by Vicci Martinez
- "Mexico" by Mana
- "Mexico" by The Soft Pack
- "Mexico" by Samiam
- "Mexico" by Sammy Hagar
- "Mexico Querido" by Dyablo
- "Mexico, ya regrese" by Los Rehenes
- "Mexico" by Satellite Stories
- "Mexico" by The Handsome Devil
- "Mexico" by The Movement
- "Mexico" by River City Extension
- "Mexico City" by Jolie Holland
- "Mexico" by Clay Walker
- "Mexico" by Zangeres Zonder Naam
- "Mexico Hermoso" by Grupo Juda
- "Mexico de Noche" by Banda Perla de Michoacan
- "Mexico en la Piel" by Luis Miguel
- "Mexico Lindo y Querido" by Javier Solis
- "Mexico Texaco" by Whitehorse
- "Mi Mexico de Grandeza" by Ricardo Rios
- "Mi Mexico de Ayer" by Chava Flores
- "Mi Mexico Lindo Adios" by Leo Dan
- ”Moon over Mexico” by Luke Combs
- "O Mexico" by Trisha Yearwood
- "Pancho and Lefty" by Townes Van Zandt and many others
- "Playboys of the Southwestern World" by Blake Shelton
- "Postcard from Mexico" by Nashville Cast
- "Run to Mexico" by The Babys
- "The Seashores of Old Mexico" by George Strait
- "So Good" by B.o.B.
- "Stays in Mexico" by Toby Keith
- South of the Border, recorded my many artists
- "Take Me Down To Mexico" by Inna
- "That's Why God Made Mexico" by Tim McGraw
- "Valley of Diamonds - Mexico City" by VUUR
- "Viva Mexico" by Aida Cuevas
- "What Am I Doing Hanging 'Round" by The Monkees
- "Yo soy Mexicano" by Mexikan Sound System
- "You Me and Mexico" by Edward Bear

== Acapulco ==
- "Acapulco" by Luis Mariano
- "Acapulco Gold" by The Rainy Daze
- "Acapulco Goldie" by Dr. Hook
- "Loco in Acapulco" by The Four Tops
- "Fun in Acapulco" by Elvis Presley
- "You Can't Say No in Acapulco" by Elvis Presley
- "Come Fly With Me" by Frank Sinatra

== Atlixco ==
- "Atlixco y mi Cantar" by Ricardo Rios

== Baja California ==
- "Baja Bus" by Butts Band
- "Puro Cachanilla" by Antonio Valdez Herrera
- "Afterglow" by The Driver Era

== Culiacan ==
- "Culiacan Sinaloa" by Chalino Sanchez
- "Un Fin de Semana en Culiacan" by Espinoza Paz

== Mexicali ==
- "Mexicali Rose" by Jack Tenney
- "Mexicali Moon" by Frank Harford
- "Mexicali" (Part of "Música para charlar") by Silvestre Revueltas
- "Mexicali nose by Harry Betts
- "Mexicali Blues" by Bob Weir
- "Puro Cachanilla" by Antonio Valdez Herrera

== Mexico City ==
- "Zocalo" by Beirut (band)
- "Mexico City" by Jolie Holland
- "Back Seat of My Car" by Paul and Linda McCartney

== Sinaloa ==
- "El Sinaloense" by Severiano Briseño

== Tampico ==
- "Tampico" by June Christy
- "Tampico Trauma" by Jimmy Buffett
- "Einmal in Tampico" (Peter Moesser / Lotar Olias) by Freddy Quinn
- "Tampico" by Eddie Meduza
- "Tampico Twist" (Franny Beecher) by Bill Haley & His Comets
- "En Tampico Está Lloviendo" by Lydia Mendoza
- "Beguine Tampico" by Tony Mottola
- "La Conocí en Tampico" (Montes) by Pepe Marchena
- "Tampico" (Adolf von Kleebsattel ) by Heino
- Chanson de Margaret (Pierre Mac Orlan/V.Marceau) Marie Dubas/ Vals / c.1957 / France"
- De Tampico a Panama (André Paté) Rico's Creole Band / Bolero /1952 /France
- Zwischen Panama und Tampico (Gerhard Wendland) Pop/c.1955-62/Germany
- For more information: click here

== Tijuana ==
- "The Tijuana Jail" by Kingston Trio
- "Born in East L.A." by Cheech Marin
- "Welcome to Tijuana" by Manu Chao
- "Tijuana makes me happy" by Nortec Collective
- "Tijuana Sound Machine" by Nortec Collective
- "Tijuna Taxi" by Herb Alpert and the Tijuana Brass

== Veracruz ==
- "Veracruz" by Warren Zevon
- "Veracruz" by Santana
