= Duggie Fields =

British artist (1945–2021)

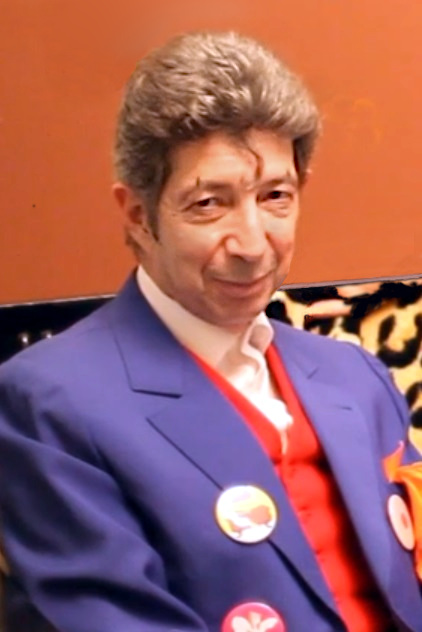
Duggie Fields, October 2011

Douglas Arthur Peter Field (6 August 1945 – 7 March 2021), known as Duggie Fields, was a British artist who resided in Earls Court, London.

== Early life ==
Fields was born in Salisbury, Wiltshire. His parents were Henry Field and his wife Edna (née Rosenthal). He grew up in the garrison town of Tidworth where his father owned a pharmacy, and later in Borehamwood, Hertfordshire. He first came to notice in 1958, when he was 14, in the Summer Exhibition at the Bladon Gallery, Hurstbourne Tarrant, while he was attending the nearby Andover Grammar School.

Fields briefly studied architecture at Regent Street Polytechnic before studying at the Chelsea School of Art for four years from 1964. He left with a scholarship that took him on his first visit to the United States, in 1968.

== Career ==
As a student, Fields' work progressed through minimal, conceptual and constructivist phases to a more hard-edged post-Pop figuration. His main influences were at that time Jackson Pollock, Mondrian and comic books, with a special regard for those worked on by Stan Lee.

In 1968, Fields went to live in Earl's Court Square and shared a flat with Syd Barrett, who had just left Pink Floyd. Fields continued to rent the flat and work in Barrett's former room, using it as his painting studio and remodelling the visual appearance of the property in his personal style.

By the middle of the 1970s, his work included many elements that were later defined as Post-modernist. In one painting, Marilyn Monroe is shown with her head severed. In 1983, Fields was invited to Tokyo by the Shiseido Corporation, where a gallery was created to show his paintings. For the occasion, the artist and his work were featured in a television, magazine, billboard and subway advertising campaign throughout Japan.

In 2002, he designed a poster for Transport for London.

In 2013, he was taken to Los Angeles by artist and benefactor Amanda Eliasch with fashion designer Pam Hogg for Opfashart, which Eliasch had put together for "Britweek".

From 2013 to 2015, Fields worked for the preservation of Earls Court Exhibition Centre – designed in the 1930s by Howard Crane – and the surrounding area. The campaign was not successful but made people aware of the general decline of architecture in London.

In 2016, Fields was celebrated by the British Film Institute FLARE with a collection of his videos. The National Portrait Gallery in London holds two portraits of Fields, by photographers David Gwinnutt and Chris Garnham.

Fields also composed and recorded music which he accompanied with spoken word performances.

== Exhibitions ==
=== Selected solo exhibitions ===
- 1971: Hamet Gallery, London
- 1972: Bear Lane Gallery, Oxford
- 1975: Kinsman-Morrison Gallery, London
- 1979: Kyle Gallery, London
- 1980: Ikon Gallery, Birmingham; Midland Group, Nottingham; New 57 Gallery, Edinburgh; Roundhouse Gallery, London
- 1982: Spacex Gallery, Exeter; B2 Gallery, London
- 1983: Shiseido Exhibition, Tokyo
- 1987: Albemarle Gallery, London
- 1991: Rempire Gallery, New York
- 2000: Random Retrospective, DuggieFields.com
- 2008: Shifting Perspectives, Galleri Gl. Lejre, Denmark

The Arts Council and University College London have examples of Fields' paintings in their collections.

=== Selected group exhibitions ===
- 1976: New London in New York, Hal Bromm Gallery, New York
- 1979: The Figurative Show, Nicola Jacobs Gallery, London; Masks, The Ebury Gallery, London; Culture Shock, The Midland Group, Nottingham; Art and Artifice, B2 Gallery, London
- 1983: Taste, Victoria and Albert Museum, London
- 1984: The Male Nude, Homeworks Gallery, London
- 1985: Image-Codes, Art about Fashion, The Australian Centre for Contemporary Art, Melbourne; VisualAid, Royal Academy, London
- 1986: The Embellishment of the Statue of Liberty, Cooper Hewitt Museum/Barney's, New York
- 1987: Twenty Artists Twenty Techniques, Albemarle Gallery, London
- 1989: Fashion and Surrealism, Victoria and Albert Museum, London
- 1988: Het Mannelisknaakt, Gallery Bruns, Amsterdam, St. Judes Gallery, London
- 1990: Universal Language, Rempire Gallery, New York
- 1993: Tranche d'Art Contemporain Anglais, Tutesaal, Luxembourg
- 1998: Exquisite Corpse, Jibby Beane, London
- 1999: Art 1999, Jibby Beane, London; Flesh, Blains Fine Art, London Nerve, I.C.A., London
- 2000: Art 2000, Jibby Beane, London Up & Co., New York
