= List of songs about Delhi =

The following is a list of songs written about Delhi, also known as "Dilli", the capital city of India:

- "Dilli Shehar Ki Khudiyan" – sung by Surinder Shinda in 1989.
- "Dilli Shehar Mein" – used in 2012 Hariyanvi film Tera Mera Vaada
- "Dilli Dilli" – sung by Aditi Singh Sharma in the film No One Killed Jessica (2011).
- "Dilli Ki Sardi" – Zameen (2003) film song.

"Dilliwalon Ki Delhi" – song from Delhi 6 (2009).

== Other ==
- "Kajra Mohabbat Wala" – 1968 song from Kismat, sung by Asha Bhosle and Shamshad Begum, mentions "Dilli Shehar Ka Saara Meena Bazaar Leke".
- "Kajra Re" – 2004 song by Alisha Chinai, Shankar Mahadevan and Javed Ali in Bunty aur Bubly film, mensions "Tujhse Milna Purani Dilli Mein" in the middle.
- "Yahan Ek Nadi" song indirectly points to the city of Delhi, sung by Rabbi Shergill in his album Delhi Heights.
- "Chor Bazari" song indirectly points to the city of Delhi, sung by Neeraj Shridhar and Sunidhi Chauhan in the movie "Love Aajkal", mentions "Tu na badli, main na badla, Delhi saari dekh badal gayi".
