= List of songs about Houston =

This article lists songs about Houston, Texas set there, or named after a location or feature of the city.

It is not intended to include songs where Houston is simply "name-checked" along with various other cities (e.g., "London speed it up, Houston rock it", from Beyoncé's song Countdown).

== 0-9 ==
- "713" by The Carters

== B ==
- “Back To Houston” by Jeremy Castle
- “Bigger in Texas” by Megan thee Stallion
- Bloody Mary Morning by Willie Nelson
- "Bow Down (Homecoming Live)" by Beyoncé

== C ==
- "City of the Swang" by Bun B featuring Slim Thug and Mike Jones

== D ==
- "Dallas to Houston" by SPM
- "Dracula from Houston" by Butthole Surfers
- "Desires" by Drake and Future
- "Deja Vu" by Beyoncé and Jay-Z

== F ==
- "Fannin Street" by Tom Waits
- "Flawless" by Beyoncé
- "Football Time in Houston" by Clay Walker

== H ==
- "H-Town" by Dizzie Rascal
- "H-Town" by Nipsey Hussle
- "H-Town" by Short Dawg featuring Propain and Z-Ro
- "Heaven, Hell or Houston" by ZZ Top
- "Hello Houston" by Keith Wallen
- "Hello Houston" by The Starting Line
- “Hip-hop Saved My Life by Lupe Fiasco
- "Hollyweezy" by Lil Wayne
- "Home To Houston" by Steve Earle
- "Hood Party" by Fat Tony
- Houston, Texas Archie Bell & Drells
- "Houstatlantavegas" by Drake
- "Houston, I’m Coming To See You” by Glen Campbell
- "Houston" by Aaron Watson
- “Houston” by Chevy Woods
- "Houston" by Dean Martin
- "Houston" by Kaos, Karl, and Jae Kennedy
- "Houston" by Mary Chapin Carpenter
- "Houston" by Oddisse
- Houston by R.E.M.
- "Houston by Soul Coughing
- "Houston" by Stephen Ashbrook
- "Houston Bound" by Lightnin Hopkins
- "Houston is Hot Tonight" by Iggy Pop
- "Houston (Means I'm One Day Closer to You)" by Larry Gatlin
- "Houston Old Head" by A$AP Rocky
- "Houston, the Action Town" by Juke Boy Bonner
- "Houston Solution" by Ronnie Milsap
- "Houston #1" by Coldplay 2017 (for the flooding)
- "Houstonfornication" by Travis Scott
- "Hustle Town by SPM
- "Houston" by The Hates

== I ==
- "I Been On" by Beyoncé
- "I Was on Dowling Street" by Lightnin' Hopkins
- "I Was Standing on 75 Highway" by Lightnin' Hopkins
- "If You Ever Get to Houston (Look Me Down) by Don Gibson
- "If You Ever Go to Houston" by Bob Dylan
- "Imagine Houston" by Joe Ely

== L ==
- “Letter from Houston” by Rod Wave
- "Living on the Edge (of Houston) by Reverend Horton Heat
- "Lord Only Knows" by Beck

== M ==
- "Midnight Special by Lead Belly
- "My Block by Scarface

== N ==
- "Night Flight from Houston" by Laurie Anderson

== P ==
- "Purple Swag" by A$ap Rocky

== R ==
- "Rainy Day in Houston" by Lightnin' Hopkins
- "Rothko Chapel" by David Dondero
- "Run the World (Girls)" by Beyoncé

== S ==
- "Say Ho" by Scott Miller
- "Space City" by Baby Bash
- "Still Tippin' by Mike Jones featuring Slim Thug and Paul Wall
- “Swangin’ On Westheimer” by Don Toliver
- "Sweet" by Brockhampton

== T ==
- "Telephone Road" by Steve Earle
- "Telephone Road" by Rodney Crowell
- "They Don't Know" by Paul Wall featuring Bun B and Mike Jones
- "Tighten Up by Archie Bell & the Drells
- “Tirando la H” by Esteban Gabriel
- “TSU” by Drake

== W ==
- "Welcome 2 Houston" by Slim Thug featuring Chamillionaire, Mike Jones, UGK, Paul Wall, Yung Redd, Lil Keke, Z-Ro, Rob G, Lil' O, Big Pockey, and Mike D
- Welcome to H-Town by Lecrae
- "White Freightliner Blues" by Townes Van Zandt
