= List of songs about Birmingham =

This is a list of songs about Birmingham, England, with lyrics in brackets where appropriate.

- Pato Banton – "Handsworth Riot"
- Broadcast – "Michael A Grammar" (Michael, wake up we're going back to Chelmsley Wood)
- Electric Light Orchestra – "Birmingham Blues" from Out of the Blue
- The Fall – "Birmingham School Of Business School"
- Go Kart Mozart – "Mrs Back-To-Front and the Bull Ring Thing"
- Rob Halford – "Made in Hell" (Metal came from foundries where the Midlands sound unfurled/The Bull Ring was a lonely place of concrete towers and steel)
- Johnny Foreigner – "Sometimes in the Bullring"
- Marie Lloyd – "Oh! Mr Porter" (Oh! Mister Porter, what shall I do?/I want to go to Birmingham and they're taking me on to Crewe)
- The Pogues – "Streets of Sorrow/Birmingham Six"
- Red Dragon and Flourgan – "Follow Me" (Follow we go London and Birmingham city)
- Sex Pistols – "Bodies" (She was a girl from Birmingham/She just had an abortion)
- The Smiths – "Panic" (Panic on the streets of London/Panic on the streets of Birmingham)
- Steel Pulse – "Handsworth Revolution"
- The Streets – "Turn The Page" (The hazy fog over the Bull Ring/The lazy ways the birds sing)
- Tippa Irie – "It's Good to Have the Feeling You're the Best" (Well I control the north, south, east and west/In London and Birmingham man haffi confess)
- Mr Hudson and the Library – "2x2" (Two by two the lovers slip, Through the frozen streets of Birmingham)
- Jon Wilks – "I Can't Find Brummagem" (This Digbeth here I wouldn't know/I miss the rogues of Brummagem) (Traditional song rewritten for modern Birmingham)
