= List of songs about Mumbai =

The following is a list of songs written about Mumbai, the capital city of Maharashtra province of India:

- "Mumbai Nagariya" - sung by Kishore Kumar in Don (1978) film.
- "Bambai Nagariya" - another song different lyrics in Taxi No. 9211 (2006) film. Bappi Lahiri sang it.
- "Mumbai Salsa" - sung by Alisha Chinai as solo and her duet with Adnan Sami in Mumbai Salsa (2007) film.
- "Bombay Se Aaya Mera Dost" - sung by Kishore Kumar in the film Aap Ki Khatir (1977 film)
- "Ae Dil hai mushkil jeena yahan" - sung by Mohd Rafi and Geeta Dutt (C.I.D, 1956 movie)
- "Bambai Humko Jam Gayi" - song by Amit Kumar - film: Swarg
- "Yeh Hai Mumbai Meri Jaan"
