= List of songs about Tipperary =

This is a list of songs about County Tipperary, Ireland.

- “Any Tipperary town” -written by Pat Ely, recorded by many artists including Daniel O'Donnell.
- “Brennan on the Moor” - 19th Century ballad.
- "Cill Chais" - a lament related to the family at Kilcash Castle.
- "The Bansha Peeler"
- "Éamonn an Chnoic" - about Éamonn Ó Riain, an Irish aristocrat who lived in County Tipperary from 1670 to 1724 and became a rapparee.
- "Fair Clonmel"
- "Flynn of Ballinure"
- "Galtee Mountain Boy"
- "The Glen of Aherlow" (also known as "Patrick Sheehan") - based on the true story of a young ex-soldier from the Glen of Aherlow named Patrick Sheehan who was blinded at the Siege of Sevastopol.
- "Goodbye Mick (Leaving Tipperary)" - recorded by P.J. Murrihy and by Ryan's Fancy
- “Home to Aherlow”
- “It's a Long Way to Tipperary”, British Music hall song written in 1912 by Henry James "Harry" Williams and co-credited to Jack Judge.
- "The Hills Of Killenaule" - music by Liam O’Donnell and lyrics by Davy Cormack, both from Killenaule
- "Michael Hogan"
- "Munster Hurling Final"
- "My Old Tipperary Home"
- “Rare Clonmel”
- "Seán Treacy" - ballad about Seán Treacy, leader of the Third Tipperary Brigade, IRA, who was killed in Dublin in 1920
- "She Lived Beside The Anner"
- "Slievenamon" - one of the best-known Tipperary songs, written by Charles Kickham
- "Sliabh na mBan" - an Irish-language song composed by Michéal O Longáin of Carrignavar and translated by Seamus Ennis, about the massacre in July 1798 of a party of Tipperary insurgents at Carrigmoclear on the slopes of Slievenamon
- ”Tipperary on my Mind”
- "Strolling Through Tipperary"
- "Streets of Mulllinahone"
- "Tipperary Hills For Me"
- "The Tipperary Christening"
- "Tipperary Far Away"
- "Tipperary" - a love song written in 1907 by Leo Curley, James M. Fulton and J. Fred Helf.
- "The Station of Knocklong"
- "Shanagolden" - written by Seán McCarthy. Recorded by Connie Foley, among others.
- "The Further it is From Tipperary" by Jack Norworth.

== See also ==
- Music of Ireland
