= VH1's Legends =

- Also known as: Legends
- Genre: Music television documentary
- Written by: Mary Wharton
- Directed by: Shari Springer Berman; Robert Pulcini; Matthew Ginsburg
- Narrated by: Kris Kristofferson; Henry Rollins; Eddie Izzard; Steven Tyler; William Baldwin; Ossie Davis; James Justice
- Country of origin: United States
- Original language: English

Production
- Producers: Mary Wharton; Jim Berman; Matthew Ginsburg; Brian Briskman; Tom Kaniewski; Angela Quilala
- Cinematography: Mark Ritchie
- Editors: Miles Barken; Alexander Hall; Sakae Ishikawa
- Production companies: Gay Rosenthal Productions; Viacom Productions; VH1 Television

Original release
- Release: 1995 – 2001

Legends (aka VH1's Legends) is a music biography television series on VH1. Originally sponsored by AT&T Corporation, this series documents those artists (living or dead) who have made a significant contribution to music history to be profiled on the show (as opposed to VH1's companion series, Behind the Music, which profiles mostly moderately significant artists).

The show goes in-depth into the entire career of the artist(s), with each episode containing rare concert and music video footage.

The initial episodes were narrated by Kris Kristofferson, however other narrators have included Sheryl Crow, Steven Tyler (of Aerosmith), Ossie Davis, Tate Donovan, Levon Helm, Henry Rollins, Charlie Rose, and James Justice. Recent episodes have been narrated by William Baldwin (husband of singer Chynna Phillips).

Episodes
Name	Episode	Aired
Pink Floyd & Syd Barrett	Season 3, Episode 3	2002-13-01
Sam Cooke	Season 3, Episode 2	2001-12-17
Jimi Hendrix	Season 3, Episode 1	2001-05-20
The Bee Gees	Season 2, Episode 6	2000-07-21
Neil Young	Season 2, Episode 5	2000-06-16
Crosby, Stills, Nash & Young	Season 2, Episode 4	2000-03-13
The Clash	Season 2, Episode 3	1999-12-20
George Clinton	Season 2, Episode 2	1999-11-29
The Pretenders	Season 2, Episode 1	1999-10-26
John Lennon	Season 1, Episode 20	1997-04-14
Led Zeppelin	Season 1, Episode 19	1997-04-07
Janis Joplin	Season 1, Episode 18	1997-03-31
Bruce Springsteen	Season 1, Episode 17	1997-03-24
Queen	Season 1, Episode 16	1997-03-17
Stevie Ray Vaughan	Season 1, Episode 15	1997-03-10
B. B. King	Season 1, Episode 14	1997-03-03
John Fogerty	Season 1, Episode 13	1997-02-24
Elton John	Season 1, Episode 12	1997-02-17
Aretha Franklin	Season 1, Episode 11	1997-02-10
Curtis Mayfield	Season 1, Episode 10	1997-02-03
Tina Turner	Season 1, Episode 9	1997-01-27
Johnny Cash	Season 1, Episode 8	1997-01-20
David Bowie	Season 1, Episode 7	1997-01-13
U2	Season 1, Episode 6	1997-01-06
The Doors	Season 1, Episode 5	1996-12-30
Eric Clapton	Season 1, Episode 4	1996-12-23
Marvin Gaye	Season 1, Episode 3	1996-12-16
The Grateful Dead	Season 1, Episode 2	1996-12-09
The Who	Season 1, Episode 1	1996-12-02

Tina Turner, Elton John, and John Lennon are the only artists so far to have been profiled on both Legends and Behind the Music.
