= Funboy Five =

English post-punk band

- Origin: Hemel Hempstead, Hertfordshire, United Kingdom
- Genres: Post-punk
- Years active: 1979–1981, 2014–
- Members: Mick Sinclair; John McRae; Bob Brimson; Robert Radhall

Formed in January 1979, the Funboy Five were an English post-punk band from Hemel Hempstead, Hertfordshire and originally had four members, Mick Sinclair (guitar and vocals), John McRae (keyboards), Bob Brimson (bass) and Robert Radhall (drums).

== 1979-2007: original formation and sporadic activity ==
While gigging sporadically in London and south-east England, the band recorded a three-track demo which earned them a review in Sounds and a session for the John Peel Show. First broadcast in October 1979, the session was followed in January 1980 by a single, "Life After Death"/"Compulsive Eater", which also saw the debut of the new rhythm section of Dave Tyler (bass) and Paul Ingram (drums), released on the band's own Cool-Cat-Daddy-O record label. Also released on the label in 1980 was a 7-track cassette Funboy Five Shall Inherit The Earth, which included demos and other material.

Although the band ceased recording and playing live in 1981, the single became a sought-after rarity among collectors of DIY vinyl being listed in journalist Johan Kugelberg's 100 best records of the post-punk DIY-era, first published in Ugly Things magazine. During the 1990s and 2000s, "Life After Death" featured on two unofficial vinyl compilations, Teenage Treats Vol.10 and Killed By Death #007.

During 2001, the band gathered their recorded material together for a 13-track CD, Very Hush! Hush!, shared with Milkshake Melon, Mick Sinclair's solo alter-ego. In 2007, the band were represented by two tracks on Messthetics #101: DIY 77–81 London, a CD retrospective with "Compulsive Eater" on the main release and "Haircut Bob Dylan 66" as a mp3 bonus track.

== 2009-present: revivals and further albums ==
In 2009, "Life After Death" was included on Universal's four-CD tribute to John Peel, Kats Karavan: The History of John Peel On The Radio.

A cover version of "Life After Death", by Talya Cooper, appeared as a digital download in 2011. A cover version, by Das Boomerang, of both sides of the first single appeared as a digital download in 2018.

Two original members, Mick Sinclair and John McRae, revived the band and the Cool-Cat-Daddy-O label in August 2014 releasing a vinyl single, "Save the World"/"What Did You Do with the Body?". "Save The World" was described by Record Collector as "like a bonker's contest to play "In The Mood" without actually playing it".

In June 2015 came another single, "Radio Free Asia", and a vinyl retrospective album, Landmarks Ruins and Memories, of remastered recordings from 1979 to 1981 on the Italian re-issue label, Ave Phoenix Records described as sounding "a bit like Love's Forever Changes on happy pills."

A further single, "Vipers of the Commonwealth", appeared in 2016 as did "The Radmall Rundown", a tribute instrumental to the band's original drummer who died in 2015. Five further new songs were released in 2018 while January 2019 saw the release of an album, The Greatest Album Of All Time, September 2019 the four-track set An Autumn Collection, December 2020 the five-track collection Six Pigeons On A Rooftop Discuss A Snappy Title, and December 2021 the singles Back To Vancouver and Life Is Boring. Another four-track set, Songs Of Ghosts And Demons: Volume One, appeared in January 2022 as in February 2023 did The Shape Of The Universe. Songs Of Ghosts And Demons: Volume Two was released in August 2024. A standalone single "The Hot New Sound Of England Today (1980)", was released in February 2025, and another "Last Year At Marienbad", in May 2026.
