= List of songs about or referencing Syd Barrett =

Syd Barrett was an English singer, songwriter, musician and painter who co-founded the rock band Pink Floyd in 1965. He was known to be reclusive. Reclusiveness may coincide with mental disorders and some persons may have speculative diagnoses of schizophrenia (see List of people with schizophrenia), but this does not mean that Barrett's songs, and the songs about him, concern reclusion: for example, the instrumental "Interstellar Overdrive" exemplify Pink Floyd's early psychedelic period.

Barrett left Pink Floyd less than a year after the release of their first single, "Arnold Layne". He played with the band only on their first two albums (The Piper at the Gates of Dawn and A Saucerful of Secrets), contributing the song "Jugband Blues" as the closing track on the latter, before recording two albums in 1970 (The Madcap Laughs and Barrett), the latter of which failed to chart. In 1975, the Pink Floyd album Wish You Were Here became a popular screed against music business with its theme the loss of Barrett. (Note: Lasri, Hemza (18 December 2009). "Top Ten: Songs about other artists". ClashMusic.com. Clash Magazine Limited.)

With the decline of the record industry (Note: Evangelista, Benny (16 June 2003). "Music industry changing its tune / Teenagers who download from Internet finally forcing record industry to adapt". SFGate. Hearst Communications, Inc.) and changes in the music business, (Note: Wolff, Michael (10 June 2002). "Facing the Music". NYMag.com. New York Media LLC.) Barrett's alienation remains relevant. The following list is indicative of Barrett's legacy.

== Songs ==
Released	Title	Writer(s)	Artist	Notes
1996	"What's the New Mary Jane"	John Lennon	The Beatles	Aug 1968 outtake, supposedly inspired by Barrett, released in 1996
Apr 1999	"Incarceration of a Flower a Child"	Roger Waters	Marianne Faithfull	1968 composition supposedly about Barrett, or perhaps a revision of it
Oct 1970	"If"	Roger Waters	Pink Floyd	Supposedly about Barrett
Sep 1978	"Pink's Song"	Richard Wright	Richard Wright	Visibly about Barrett
Nov 1972	"Oh! Wot A Dream"	Kevin Ayers	Kevin Ayers	About Barrett
Mar 1973	"Brain Damage"	Roger Waters	Pink Floyd	References Barrett
Sep 1974	"Mr. Barrett"	John Steele	Flaming Star	From a self-produced album dedicated to Barrett
Sep 1975	"Shine On You Crazy Diamond"	Roger Waters, Richard Wright, David Gilmour	Pink Floyd	About Barrett
1978	"Psychedelic Punkeroo"	Twink	Twink And The Fairies	About Barrett
Jan 1981	"I Know Where Syd Barrett Lives"	Dan Treacy	Television Personalities	About Barrett
Apr 1981	"The Man Who Invented Himself"	Robyn Hitchcock	Robyn Hitchcock	Wrongly supposed to be about Barrett
May 1984	"Song For Syd Barrett"	Martin Newell	The Cleaners from Venus	About Barrett
1986	"Stolen Letters"	Magic Y, Uncle T	Peter Sellers and the Hollywood Party	About Barrett
1987	"Spun Out Of A Mind"	Magic Uncle	Peter Sellers and the Hollywood Party	Barrett lyrics in title (of the 7" single)
June 1992	"Song For Randy Newman Etc."	Martin Phillipps	The Chills	Barrett mentioned
Mar 1994	"High Hopes"	David Gilmour, Polly Samson	Pink Floyd	Refers to Barrett
1995	"Syd's Wine"	Steve Peregrin Took	Steve Peregrin Took	1972 demo. (Original 1971 song title was "Beautiful Deceiver"); Release title refers to Barrett whom, Tony Secunda alleged, performed on the track.
Feb 1996	"A Star Too Far (Lullaby for Syd Barrett)"	Genesis P-Orridge, Larry Thrasher	Genesis P-Orridge and Psychic TV	About Barrett
May 1996	"My Man Syd"	Anton Newcombe, The BJM	The Brian Jonestown Massacre	About Barrett
Oct 1998	"1974"	Robyn Hitchcock	Robyn Hitchcock	Refers to Barrett
Nov 1998	"Hyperdrive Reprise"	Dave Brock	Hawkwind	Instrumental for Pink Floyd book, partial cover
2000	"Anyday-Anyway (Encore)"	Kevin Coyne, Achim Goettert	Kevin Coyne	From a self-distributed live album about Barrett
Dec 2000	"Ya znayu, gde zhivet Syd Barrett"	Umka & Bro	Umka & Bro	Russian version of "I Know Where Syd Barrett Lives"
June 2004	"Syd Barrett Blues"	Rod Webber	Rod Webber	About Barrett
Oct 2005	"Gente de Barrett"	Sidonie	Sidonie	About Barrett
Feb 2006	"Syd Barrett"	Alain Pire	Michel Drucker Experience	About Barrett
Sep 2006	"Scarecrows In The Rain"	Mystery Jets	Mystery Jets	About Barrett
Oct 2008	"Oranges and Apples"	The Trash Can Sinatras	The Trash Can Sinatras	About Barrett
Nov 2008	"Dark Asteroid"	The Damned	The Damned	Dedicated to Barrett
Dec 2008	"Nobody Home"	Phil Judd, Rod Leith	Phil Judd	Refers to Barrett
2009	"We Know Where Mr. Barrett Lives"	Michael Svidén	Michael Swidén	Revision of a July 2006 MP3 about Barrett, released in 2010
Sep 2010	"Morts-Vivants"	Katerine	Katerine	Mentions Barrett (in French)
Mar 2012	"When Your Garden's Overgrown"	Paul Weller, Simon Dine	Paul Weller	About Barrett
Oct 2012	"Agnus Dei"	Fred Fortin	Gros Mené	Mentions Barrett (in French)

== Other songs ==
The above list may be incomplete, and subtle references may be found in songs not included above, especially Pink Floyd songs such as "Fearless", which would be more explicit in "Brain Damage" and songs in The Wall such as "Hey You" and "Nobody Home". Some claimed Barrett references turn out to be spurious. The Shamen credit their song "It's All Around" to Barrett and some bands, like Jennifer Gentle, are named after Barrett songs (in this case, from a line in "Lucifer Sam"); two bands are known as Baby Lemonade. Italian band Birdy Hop is named after a Syd Barrett song; the title of their debut album, Welcome To The Insanity Ride, recalls a line from "Octopus" and producer and singer-songwriter Amerigo Verardi has been compared to Barrett. Los Prisioneros's "Concepción" mentions Barrett in the chorus, referencing the rumors about him living in Chiguayante, and how supposedly the 2 cities he ever made a concert in were London and Concepción.

== Cover versions of Barrett songs ==
Of the many cover versions of Syd Barrett songs, the best-known are David Bowie's 1973 "See Emily Play", The Jesus and Mary Chain's 1984 "Vegetable Man", R.E.M.'s 1989 "Dark Globe" and the Smashing Pumpkins' 1991 "Terrapin".

== Internet songs ==
Sharing and streaming over the Internet has resulted in a number of unreleased Barrett tributes, including the 1999 mp3 "Elephant" by Rex Tangle on his website, the 2000 instrumental MP3 "A Tribute to Syd" by The Worms on disc 18 of Have You Got It Yet?, a 2007 video of "There's A Man In Cambridge (Song for Syd Barrett)" by "Alec" on YouTube, and a 2007 parody cover video ("Pink Floyd – Paying The Piper") by "Pauldullson", also on YouTube.

== Notes ==
The following are references cited in order to link to explanatory information. The references not cited in specific parts of the article are in the External links section at the bottom of the page. The other sources are in the next section.
