= List of songs about Kolkata =

The following is a list of songs written about Kolkata or Calcutta, the capital city of West Bengal province of India:

- "Hymn for Kolkata" – by The Geek's Guitar
- "Ami Miss Calcutta" – sung by Aarti Mukherjee in Basanta Bilap (1972) film
- "Kolkata" – sung by Nachiketa Chakraborty in Ei Besh Bhalo Achhi (1993) album
- "Ami Kolkatar Rosogolla" – sung by Kavita Krishnamurthy
- "Na Champa Na Chameli" – sung by Mamta Sharma in Bikram Singha: The Lion Is Back (2012) film, mentions "Kolkata"
- "Kolkatar Rosogolla" – sung by Kavita Krishnamurthy in Cockpit (2017) film
- "Kolkata Kolkata" – sung by Usha Uthup
- "Amar Shohor" – sung by Shreya Ghoshal in Uro Chithi (2011) film
- "Kolkata" – sung by Anupam Roy and Shreya Ghoshal in Praktan (2016) film
- "O Kolkata" – sung by Shreya Ghoshal in Uraan (2020) film
- "Amar Shohor Kolkata" – a song from Kolkata Special film.
- "Calcutta", a German song sung by Lawrence Welk
- "Amar Shohor" by Chandrabindoo sung by Anindya Chatterjee
- "Yamaha Nagari " by Mani Sharma in Telugu movie Choodalani Vundi sung by Hariharan.
