= List of songs about Birmingham, Alabama =

This is a list of songs written about the city of Birmingham, Alabama:

- "Birmingham, Alabama" by Harry Belafonte and R. B. Greaves
- "Birmingham Bertha" written by Harry Akst and Grant Clarke, sung by Ethel Waters (1929) (from On with the Show!)
- "Am I Blue?" written by Harry Akst and Grant Clarke, sung by Ethel Waters (1929) (from On with the Show!)
- "Birmingham Black Bottom" by Charlie Johnson (1927)
- "Birmingham Blues" by Edith Wilson, Fats Waller (and many others) (1921)
- "Birmingham Blues" by The Charlie Daniels Band (1997)
- "Birmingham Bounce" by Tommy Dorsey (1946)
- "Birmingham Breakdown" by Duke Ellington (1926)
- "Birmingham Bus Station" by Charlie Daniels Band (1994)
- "Birmingham Daddy" by Gene Autry
- "Birmingham Jail" by Lead Belly
- "Birmingham Shadows" by Bruce Cockburn (1995)
- "Birmingham Sunday" by Richard Farina, recorded by Joan Baez
- "Birmingham Turnaround" by Keith Whitley
- "Birmingham" by Amanda Marshall
- "Birmingham" by Drive-By Truckers (2002)
- "Birmingham" by Randy Newman
- "Birmingham" by Shovels & Rope (2012)
- "Boulder to Birmingham" by Emmylou Harris
- "Breakfast in Birmingham" by David Lee Murphy
- "Down and Out in Birmingham" by Pirates of the Mississippi
- "Hello Birmingham" by Ani DiFranco
- "I Got a Man in a 'Bama Mine" by Merline Johnson (1937)
- "Mining Camp Blues" by Trixie Smith (1925)
- "Notifier Birmingham" by The Mountain Goats (1995)
- "Paint Me a Birmingham" by Tracy Lawrence (2004)
- "Postmarked Birmingham" by Blackhawk
- "Pratt City Blues" by Jabo Williams (1932)
- "Sparrows over Birmingham" by Josh Rouse
- "Sweet Birmingham" by Robert Moore (first recorded by Taj Mahal)
- "Sweet Home Alabama" by Lynyrd Skynyrd (1974)
- "Talking Birmingham Jam" by Phil Ochs (1965)
- "The Old Iron Hills" by Maylene and the Sons of Disaster
- "Train to Birmingham" by John Hiatt
- "Tuxedo Junction" by Erskine Hawkins
- "When Jesus Left Birmingham" by John Mellencamp (1993)

Birmingham is also mentioned in the following:

- "Alabama Chicken" by Sean Hayes (2003)
- “Birmingham” by Zach Bryan (2020)
- "Black Betty" by Huddie Ledbetter/Ram Jam
- "Cities" by Talking Heads (1979)
- "Gun Street Girl" by Tom Waits (1985)
- "Hey Hey Hey Hey (Going back to Birmingham)" by Bob Seger
- "Hey, Hey, Hey, Hey" by Little Richard
- "I Can't Love You Anymore" by Lyle Lovett
- “I Wish Grandpas Never Died” by Riley Green (2019)
- "If It Hadn't Been For Love" by The Steeldrivers (2008)
- "I've Made Up My Mind to Give Myself to You" by Bob Dylan (2020)
- "Jacob's Ladder" by Bruce Hornsby (first recorded by Huey Lewis and the News) (1987)
- "Maribel" by Andy Offutt Irwin
- "Old Iron Hills" by Maylene And The Sons Of Disaster (2009)
- "One of These Days" by Drive-By Truckers
- "Playboy Mommy" by Tori Amos (1998)
- "Postmarked, Birmingham" by Blackhawk
- "Promised Land" by Chuck Berry (later remade as a 1975 hit for Elvis Presley)
- "Rip This Joint" by The Rolling Stones (1972)
- "Run Baby Run" by Sheryl Crow (1993)
- "Southern Hospitality" by Trinity the Tuck (2022)
- "Stars Fell on Alabama" by Frank Perkins/Mitchell Parish (1934)
- "Sweet Home Alabama" by Lynyrd Skynyrd
- "Swordfishtrombone" by Tom Waits (1983)
- "Black Betty" by Ram Jam
