= List of songs about Seattle =

This is a list of songs about the American city of Seattle.

Title	Band / Musician	Year
"50K Deep"	Blue Scholars	2007
"Aurora"	Foo Fighters	1999
"Aurora Bridge"	The Young Fresh Fellows	1987
"The Ave"	Blue Scholars	2004
"Baby, I'm an Anarchist"	Against Me!	2001
"Belltown Ramble"	Robyn Hitchcock	2006
"The Best I Ever Had"	The Swellers	2011
"Big Homie Style" feat. J.Pinder, GMK & Spaceman	Jake One	2008
"The Boy From Seattle"	Steve Vai	1994
"Chains"	Patty Loveless	1988
"City Don't Sleep"	Macklemore	2005
"City of Orphans"	The Classic Crime	2012
"Claiming the City"	Macklemore	2005
"Cowboy Boots"	Macklemore	2012
"The Day Seattle Died"	Cold	2002
"Downtown"	Macklemore	2015
"Emerald City"	United State of Electronica	2005
"Evergreen Christmas"	Loni Rose	1993
"Frances Farmer Will Have Her Revenge on Seattle"	Nirvana	1993
"Fuck You Seattle"	Broadway Calls	2006
"The Gates of Ballard"	Sunn O	2003
"Gold"	Macklemore	2012
"Gold Rush"	Death Cab for Cutie	2018
"Hello Seattle"	Owl City	2007
"Home"	Jake One	2008
"I Left My Flannel In Seattle"	Butt Trumpet	1993
"I Love Seattle"	Tacocat	2016
"I'm Gonna Hang My Hat (On A Tree That Grows In Ballard)"	Stan Boreson	1982
"I Miss Seattle"	charlieonnafriday	2024
"Inkwell"	Blue Scholars	2004
"Interstate 5"	The Wedding Present	2004
"Kiro TV"	Sneaker Pimps	2002
"Jet City Woman"	Queensrÿche	1991
"Joe Metro"	Blue Scholars	2007
"Love Love Love"	The Mountain Goats	2005
"Moving to Seattle"	The Material	2007
"The Mud Shark"	The Mothers	1971
"My Oh My"	Macklemore	2010
"New Way Home"	Foo Fighters	1996
"NxNW Remix"	Blue Scholars ft. Jake One and Macklemore	2007
"Pike Street/Park Slope"	Harvey Danger	2000
"Posse on Broadway"	Sir Mix-a-Lot	1988
"Queen Anne"	Flop	1995
"Rainier Fog"	Alice In Chains	2018
"Ringway to SeaTac"	The Wedding Present	2004
"School"	Nirvana	1989
"Seagulls of Seattle"	Paul Kelly	2018
"Seatown Funk"	Kid Sensation	1995
"Seattlantis"	The Fall of Troy	2006/2007
"Seattle"	The Classic Crime	2007
"Seattle"	Cop Shoot Cop	1993
"Seattle"	Jeffrey Lewis	2001
"Seattle" (The Bluest Skies ...)	Hugo Montenegro, Perry Como and Bobby Sherman	1968
"Seattle"	The Brighton Port Authority (feat Emmy The Great)	2009
"Seattle"	Public Image Limited	1987
"Seattle"	Mark Knopfler	2012
"Seattle"	Mary Mary	2008
"SEATTLE"	Sam Kim	2016
"Seattle Ain't Bullshittin'"	Sir Mix-a-Lot	1991
"Seattlehead"	Duff McKagan	2000
"Seattle Hunch"	Jelly Roll Morton	1941
"Seattle Party"	Chastity Belt	2013
"Seattle the Peerless City"	Arthur O. Dillon	1909 (official song of Seattle)
"Seattle, WA"	The Jim Yoshii Pile-Up	2003
"Seattle Was a Riot"	Anti-Flag	2001
"September in Seattle"	Shawn Mullins	1995
"The Shadow of Seattle"	Marcy Playground	1996
"Sick of Seattle"	The Smithereens	1994
"Slick Watts"	Blue Scholars	2011
"Sub Pop Rock City"	Soundgarden	1986–1988
"Summer Night in Seattle"	Jenna Drey	~2012
"Sunny in Seattle"	Blake Shelton	2011
"Supermoon"	Summer Salt	2023
"Talkin' Seattle Grunge Rock Blues"	Todd Snider	1994
"Teardrop Windows"	Benjamin Gibbard	2012
"This Place Is a Prison"	The Postal Service	2001/2002
"The Town"	Macklemore	2009
"Vagabonds"	The Classic Crime	2010
"Viaduct"	Posse	2012
"The View from Home"	Bryan Bowers	1977
"Viva! Sea-Tac"	Robyn Hitchcock	1999
"Welcome to Seattle"	Boom Bap Project	2005
"Wir sind hier nicht in Seattle, Dirk"	Tocotronic	1995
"Work in Progress"	Set Your Goals	2006
"Meet Me In Seattle (At The Fair)"	Joy and the Boys	1962
"Slick Watts"	Blue Scholars	2011
