= List of songs based on literary works =

This is a list of songs that retell, in whole or in part, a work of literature. Albums listed here consist entirely of songs retelling a work of literature.

== Albums ==
Album	Musical artist	Literary work	Author	Comments	Citations
An Alien Heat, The Hollow Lands, and The End Of All Songs - Part 1	Spirits Burning & Michael Moorcock	The Dancers at the End of Time	Michael Moorcock	Three albums covering the three books of the trilogy.	
The Black Halo	Kamelot	Faust	Johann Wolfgang von Goethe	The Black Halo is a concept album based on Faust, Part Two. It is a follow-up to Epica, which was based on Faust, Part One.	
Cacophony	Rudimentary Peni	Various works of H. P. Lovecraft	H. P. Lovecraft	All 30 tracks are related to Lovecraft or his work.	
The Chronicle of the Black Sword	Hawkwind	Various works of Michael Moorcock	Michael Moorcock	Based on aspects of the works of Moorcock, including Elric and Jerry Cornelius. Moorcock, who has appeared with the band on numerous occasions, does the narration on Live Chronicles.	
Dust and Dreams	Camel	The Grapes of Wrath	John Steinbeck		
Epica	Kamelot	Faust	Johann Wolfgang von Goethe	Epica is a concept album based on Faust, Part One. It was followed by The Black Halo, which was based on Faust, Part Two.	
The House of Atreus Act I and The House of Atreus Act II	Virgin Steele	Oresteia	Aeschylus	Two-part concept album based loosely on the Oresteia of Aeschylus	
Jeff Wayne's Musical Version of The War of the Worlds	Jeff Wayne	The War of the Worlds	H.G. Wells		
I Robot	The Alan Parsons Project	I, Robot	Isaac Asimov		
Journey to the Centre of the Earth	Rick Wakeman	Journey to the Centre of the Earth	Jules Verne		
Leviathan	Mastodon	Moby-Dick	Herman Melville		
La Leyenda de la Mancha	Mägo de Oz	Don Quixote	Miguel de Cervantes		
The Machine Stops	Hawkwind	"The Machine Stops"	E. M. Forster		
Moby Dick or The Whale	Caleb Hayashida	Moby-Dick	Herman Melville	Concept album from written from the perspective of various characters in the novel	
Music Inspired by The Chronicles of Narnia: The Lion, the Witch and the Wardrobe		The Chronicles of Narnia	C. S. Lewis		
Seventh Son of a Seventh Son	Iron Maiden	Seventh Son	Orson Scott Card		
Shakespeare's Macbeth – A Tragedy in Steel	Rebellion	Macbeth	William Shakespeare		
Smallcreeps's Day	Mike Rutherford	Smallcreep's Day	Peter Currell Brown		
The Snow Goose	Camel	The Snow Goose: A Story of Dunkirk	Paul Gallico		
The Songs of Distant Earth	Mike Oldfield	The Songs of Distant Earth	Arthur C. Clarke		
Tales of Mystery and Imagination	The Alan Parsons Project	Various works of Edgar Allan Poe	Edgar Allan Poe		
A Tragedy in Steel Part II: Shakespeare's King Lear	Rebellion	King Lear	William Shakespeare		

== Songs ==
Song	Album	Musical artist	Literary work	Author	Comments	Citations
"7th Step"	Songs Inspired by Literature, Chapter One	Deborah Pardes	Angela's Ashes	Frank McCourt		
"40"	War	U2	The 40th Psalm of the Book of Psalms from the Hebrew Bible and the Christian Old Testament			
"1984"	Diamond Dogs	David Bowie	Nineteen Eighty-Four	George Orwell	One of several songs that Bowie wrote about Orwell's Nineteen Eighty-Four; Bowie had also hoped to produce a televised musical based on the book.	
"2112"	2112	Rush	Anthem	Ayn Rand	Song shares themes with the novel, such that Neil Peart recognized Rand in the album's liner notes.	
"Abigail"	Creatures	Motionless in White	The Crucible	Arthur Miller		
"Achilles, Agony and Ecstasy in Eight Parts"	The Triumph of Steel	Manowar	The Iliad	Homer	A retelling of the fight between Hector and Achilles	
"Adam's Apple"	Toys in the Attic	Aerosmith	The Book of Genesis from the Hebrew Bible and the Christian Old Testament		Retells the biblical story of the Fall of man through the perspective of Adam and Eve's discovery of their own sexuality.	
"Afternoons and Coffeespoons"	God Shuffled His Feet	Crash Test Dummies	"The Love Song of J. Alfred Prufrock"	T.S. Eliot	Adapts elements of the T. S. Eliot poem.	
"Ahab"	The Graduate	MC Lars	Moby-Dick	Herman Melville	Retells the story of Moby-Dick from the perspective of Captain Ahab.	
"Alice"	Every Trick in the Book	Ice Nine Kills	Go Ask Alice	Beatrice Sparks		
"All I Wanna Do"	Tuesday Night Music Club	Sheryl Crow	"Fun"	Wyn Cooper		
"All Is Not Well"	The Thing That Feels	Hannah Fury	Wicked	Gregory Maguire		
"All Nightmare Long"	Death Magnetic	Metallica	"The Hounds of Tindalos"	Frank Belknap Long		
"All Quiet On The Western Front"	Jump Up!	Elton John	All Quiet on the Western Front	Erich Maria Remarque		
"Alone"	Acoustic Verses	Green Carnation	Alone	Edgar Allan Poe		
"Among the Living"	Among the Living	Anthrax	The Stand	Stephen King		
"The Ancient Ones"	Blessed Are the Sick	Morbid Angel	The Call of Cthulhu	H. P. Lovecraft	Based on The Call of Cthulhu, as well as the rest of the Cthulhu Mythos. An earlier version of this song, named "Azagthoth", appeared on the band's demo album, Abominations of Desolation.	
"And Your Little Dog Too"	The Thing That Feels	Hannah Fury	Wicked	Gregory Maguire		
"Animal in Man"	Let's Get Free	dead prez	Animal Farm	George Orwell		
"Anthem"	Fly by Night	Rush	Anthem	Ayn Rand	Loosely based on the Rand novel; The band would produce a fuller version in 2112.	
"The Ballad of Bilbo Baggins"	Two Sides of Leonard Nimoy	Leonard Nimoy	The Hobbit	J. R. R. Tolkien		
"The Ballad of Poker Alice"	Songs Inspired by Literature, Chapter Two	Larry Kenneth Potts	Nothing Like It in the World	Stephen Ambrose	Relates the story of "Poker" Alice Ivers	
"The Ballad of Skip Wiley"	Barometer Soup	Jimmy Buffett	Tourist Season	Carl Hiaasen	A song about the character Skip Wiley from Hiaasen's 1986 novel.	
"Banana Co."		Radiohead	One Hundred Years of Solitude	Gabriel García Márquez		
"Las Batallas"	Café Tacuba	Café Tacuba	Las batallas en el desierto	José Emilio Pacheco		
"Ixtepec"	Café Tacuba	Re	Los recuerdos del porvenir	Elena Garro		
"The Battle of Evermore"	Led Zeppelin IV	Led Zeppelin	The Lord of the Rings	J. R. R. Tolkien		
"Behind the Wall of Sleep"	Black Sabbath	Black Sabbath	"Beyond the Wall of Sleep"	H. P. Lovecraft		
"Bernice Bobs Her Hair"	Liberation	The Divine Comedy	Bernice Bobs Her Hair	F. Scott Fitzgerald		
"Big Brother"	Diamond Dogs	David Bowie	Nineteen Eighty-Four	George Orwell	One of several songs that Bowie wrote about Orwell.	
"Billy Liar"	Her Majesty the Decemberists	The Decemberists	Billy Liar	Keith Waterhouse		
"Birthing Addicts"	Unreleased	Melanie Martinez	Go Ask Alice	Beatrice Sparks		
"Black Blade"	Cultösaurus Erectus	Blue Öyster Cult	Elric of Melniboné	Michael Moorcock		
"Black Corridor"	Space Ritual	Hawkwind	The Black Corridor	Michael Moorcock		
"Bloodbath & Beyond"	Every Trick in the Book	Ice Nine Kills	Dracula	Bram Stoker		
"Bob's Country"	Songs Inspired by Literature, Chapter Two	Deborah Pardes	Don't Let's Go to the Dogs Tonight	Alexandra Fuller		
"Brave New World"	Brave New World	Iron Maiden	Brave New World	Aldous Huxley		
"The Call of Ktulu"	Ride the Lightning	Metallica	The Call of Cthulhu	H. P. Lovecraft		
"Calypso"	Solitude Standing	Suzanne Vega	The Odyssey	Homer	"Written from the point of view of the sea nymph who helps Odysseus after he is shipwrecked."	
"The Cask Of Amontillado"	Tales of Mystery and Imagination	The Alan Parsons Project	"The Cask of Amontillado"	Edgar Allan Poe		
"Cassandra"		ABBA	The Iliad	Homer		
"Catcher in the Rye"	Distortland	The Dandy Warhols	The Catcher in the Rye	J. D. Salinger		
"Cent'anni di solitudine"	Terra e libertà	Modena City Ramblers	One Hundred Years of Solitude	Gabriel García Márquez		
"Chapter 24"	The Piper at the Gates of Dawn	Pink Floyd	I Ching			
"Chapter Four"	Waking the Fallen	Avenged Sevenfold	The Book of Genesis from the Hebrew Bible and the Christian Old Testament		The title refers to the fourth chapter of Genesis.	
"Charlotte Sometimes"	Faith	The Cure	Charlotte Sometimes	Penelope Farmer		
"Child of the Jago"	The Future Is Medieval	Kaiser Chiefs	A Child of the Jago	Arthur Morrison		
"Children of the Damned"	The Number of the Beast	Iron Maiden	Midwich Cuckoos	John Wyndham	Also based on two of the film adaptations of that book: Village of the Damned and Children of the Damned	
"Christabel"	No Kinda Dancer	Robert Earl Keen	Christabel	Samuel Taylor Coleridge		
"Cometh Down Hessian"	Blessed Black Wings	High on Fire	"The Hound"	H. P. Lovecraft		
"Communion of the Cursed"	Every Trick in the Book	Ice Nine Kills	The Exorcist	William Peter Blatty		
"Courage (for Hugh MacLennan)"	Fully Completely	The Tragically Hip	The Watch That Ends the Night	Hugh MacLennan		
"Crown of Creation"	Crown of Creation	Jefferson Airplane	The Chrysalids	John Wyndham		
"Curse of Athena"	Atavism	The Lord Weird Slough Feg	The Odyssey	Homer	About Odysseus's return to Ithaca.	
"Dalai Lama"	Reise, Reise	Rammstein	Erlkönig	Johann Wolfgang von Goethe		
"Damnation Alley"	Quark, Strangeness and Charm	Hawkwind	Damnation Alley	Roger Zelazny		
"Dante's Inferno"	Burnt Offerings	Iced Earth	Inferno	Dante Alighieri		
"The Dark Eternal Night"	Systematic Chaos	Dream Theater	"Nyarlathotep"	H. P. Lovecraft		
"The Dawn of a New Age"	Nemesis Divina	Satyricon	The Book of Revelation from the Christian New Testament			
"Dead"	Doolittle	Pixies	The Book of Samuel from the Hebrew Bible; II Samuel from the Christian Old Testament		Refurbishes the biblical legend of David and Bathsheba.	
"Dixieland"	The Mountain	Steve Earle & The Del McCoury Band	The Killer Angels	Michael Shaara		
"Don Quixote"	Don Quixote	Gordon Lightfoot	Don Quixote	Miguel de Cervantes		
"Doublespeak"	Beggars	Thrice	Nineteen-Eighty-Four	George Orwell		
"The Drowning Man"	Faith	The Cure	Gormenghast	Mervyn Peake		
"Dunwich"	Witchcult Today	Electric Wizard	"The Dunwich Horror"	H. P. Lovecraft		
"Edema Ruh"	Endless Forms Most Beautiful	Nightwish	The Kingkiller Chronicle	Patrick Rothfuss		
"Einstein's Brain"	Songs Inspired by Literature, Chapter One	Lynn Harrison	Driving Mr. Albert	Michael Paterniti		
"Elvenpath"	Angels Fall First	Nightwish	The Lord of the Rings	J. R. R. Tolkien		
"End of the Night"	The Doors	The Doors	Journey to the End of the Night	Louis-Ferdinand Céline		
"Envoi"	Absynthe Minded	Absynthe Minded	"Envoi"	Hugo Claus		
"Eumaeus the Swineherd"	Atavism	The Lord Weird Slough Feg	The Odyssey	Homer		
"Eveline"	Why Should the Fire Die?	Nickel Creek	Eveline	James Joyce		
"Exit Music (For a Film)"	OK Computer	Radiohead	Romeo & Juliet	William Shakespeare		
"Fable"	Volcano	Gatsbys American Dream	Lord of the Flies	William Golding		
"Flower of the Mountain"	Director's Cut	Kate Bush	Ulysses	James Joyce	The 1989 Kate Bush song The Sensual World was based on the closing paragraphs of Ulysses. However, the Joyce estate was unwilling to allow direct use of Joyce's words at that time, so she altered the lyrics. By 2011, the Joyce estate was open to licensing his work to her, so she re-worked that song as Flower of the Mountain, using Molly Bloom's soliloquy from Ulysses.	
"For Whom the Bell Tolls"	Ride the Lightning	Metallica	For Whom the Bell Tolls	Ernest Hemingway		
"Frankenstein"	Horror Show	Iced Earth	Frankenstein	Mary Shelley		
"Franz Kafka"		Scäb	The Metamorphosis	Franz Kafka	A fictional rock opera by the fictional band Scäb from the cartoon series Home Movies.	
"From the Underworld"	Paradise Lost	The Herd	Myth of Orpheus and Eurydice		Loosely based on the Greek legend of Orpheus and Eurydice	
"The Future Is Now"	Days Go By	The Offspring	Nineteen Eighty-Four	George Orwell		
"The Ghost of Tom Joad"	The Ghost of Tom Joad	Bruce Springsteen	The Grapes of Wrath	John Steinbeck		
"The Giant's Laughter"	Vansinnesvisor	Thyrfing	"Jätten"	Esaias Tegner		
"Golden Hair"	The Madcap Laughs	Syd Barrett	"Golden Hair"	James Joyce		
"Grandpa's Groove"		Parov Stelar	The Old Man and the Sea	Ernest Hemingway		
"Grendel"		Marillion	Grendel	John Gardner	A retelling of John Gardner's 1971 novel Grendel, which is a retelling of Beowulf.	
"Hallelujah"	Various Positions	Leonard Cohen	The Book of Samuel from the Hebrew Bible; II Samuel from the Christian Old Testament		Based on the biblical story of David and Bathsheba. It also incorporates elements of the story of Samson and Delilah	
"Haunted"	Haunted	Poe	House of Leaves	Mark Danielewski	"Haunted" by Poe and the novel House of Leaves by her brother, Mark Danielewski, both draw heavily on their difficult experiences growing up with their father, Tad Danielewski.	
"He Can't Come Today"	The Golden Scarab	Ray Manzarek	Waiting for Godot	Samuel Beckett		
"Hedda Gabler"	Animal Justice	John Cale	Hedda Gabler	Henrik Ibsen		
"Hell in the Hallways"	Every Trick in the Book	Ice Nine Kills	Carrie	Stephen King		
"Hey (rise of the robots)"	Black and White	The Stranglers	I, Robot	Isaac Asimov		
"Hey Ahab"	The Union	Elton John & Leon Russell	Moby-Dick	Herman Melville	Based on the character Captain Ahab.	
"Hey There Ophelia"	This Gigantic Robot Kills	MC Lars	Hamlet	William Shakespeare		
"High Rise"	PXR5	Hawkwind	High-Rise	J. G. Ballard		
"Home at Last"	Aja	Steely Dan	The Odyssey	Homer	Retells Ulysses' encounter with the Sirens.	
"Horrorshow"		Scars	A Clockwork Orange	Anthony Burgess		
"House at Pooh Corner"	Uncle Charlie & His Dog Teddy	Nitty Gritty Dirt Band	The House at Pooh Corner	A. A. Milne	This song, written by Kenny Loggins, was later performed by Loggins and Messina on their 1971 album Sittin' In. In 1994, Loggins added additional lyrics and re-recorded it with Amy Grant as Return to Pooh Corner for his album Return to Pooh Corner.	
"House of Leaves"	Juturna	Circa Survive	House of Leaves	Mark Danielewski		
"How Beautiful You Are"	Kiss Me, Kiss Me, Kiss Me	The Cure	"Les Yeux des Pauvres"	Charles Baudelaire		
"Hug Me til You Drug Me"	Here, Here and Here	Meg & Dia	Brave New World	Aldous Huxley		
"I Can't Let You In"	The Thing That Feels	Hannah Fury	Wicked	Gregory Maguire		
"I Robot"		U.K. Subs	I, Robot	Isaac Asimov		
"In Every Dream Home a Heartache"	For Your Pleasure	Roxy Music	"Dead As They Come"	Ian McEwan		
"In Like a Lion (Always Winter)"	Apathetic EP	Relient K	The Lion, The Witch, and The Wardrobe	C. S. Lewis		
"The Inner Light"		The Beatles	Tao Te Ching			
"The Insect God"	The Insect God	Monks of Doom	The Insect God	Edward Gorey		
"The Iron Dream"	Quark, Strangeness and Charm	Hawkwind	The Iron Dream	Norman Spinrad		
"It Was Her House That Killed Nessarose"	The Thing That Feels	Hannah Fury	Wicked	Gregory Maguire		
"Jack of Shadows"		Hawkwind	Jack of Shadows	Roger Zelazny		
"Jamaica Inn"	The Beekeeper	Tori Amos	Jamaica Inn	Daphne du Maurier		
"Jean Val Jean"		Edison Glass	Les Misérables	Victor Hugo		
"Killing an Arab"		The Cure	The Stranger	Albert Camus		
"Land"	Horses	Patti Smith	The Wild Boys	William S. Burroughs		
"The Last Temptation of Odysseus"	Songs Inspired by Literature, Chapter One	Justin Wells	The Odyssey	Homer		
"Lay Down"	Bursting at the Seams	Strawbs	The 23rd Psalm of the Book of Psalms from the Hebrew Bible and the Christian Old Testament			
"The Legend of Enoch Arden"	Songs Inspired by Literature, Chapter One	Diane Zeigler	"The Legend of Enoch Arden"	Alfred Lord Tennyson		
"Let it Show"	The Thing That Feels	Hannah Fury	Wicked	Gregory Maguire		
"Listen (The Silences)"	Songs Inspired by Literature, Chapter Two	Michelle Bloom	Raids on the Unspeakable	Thomas Merton		
"Lolita"	The Black Magic Show	Elefant	Lolita	Vladimir Nabokov		
"The Loneliness of the Long Distance Runner"	Somewhere in Time	Iron Maiden	The Loneliness of the Long Distance Runner	Alan Sillitoe		
"The Longest Day"	A Matter of Life and Death	Iron Maiden	The Longest Day	Cornelius Ryan		
"Lord of Light"	Doremi Fasol Latido	Hawkwind	Lord of Light	Roger Zelazny		
"Lord of the Flies"	The X Factor	Iron Maiden	Lord of the Flies	William Golding		
"Lost Boy"		Ruth B	Peter Pan	J. M. Barrie		
"Love and Death"	Dream Harder	The Waterboys	Love and Death	William Butler Yeats		
"Love and Destroy"		Franz Ferdinand	The Master and Margarita	Mikhail Bulgakov		
"Lucy"	Liberation	The Divine Comedy	The Lucy poems	William Wordsworth		
"The Machine Stops"	Standing in the Light	Level 42	"The Machine Stops"	E. M. Forster		
"Macondo"		Óscar Chávez	One Hundred Years of Solitude	Gabriel García Márquez	Based on the fictional town Macondo, used by Marquez in One Hundred Years of Solitude and other of his works.	
"Martin Eden"		Billie Hughes	Martin Eden	Jack London		
"Magnu"	Warrior on the Edge of Time	Hawkwind	"Hymn of Apollo"	Percy Bysshe Shelley		
"Matilda"	Harry's House	Harry Styles	Matilda	Roald Dahl		
"Me, Myself & Hyde"	Every Trick in the Book	Ice Nine Kills	The Strange Case of Dr. Jekyll and Mr. Hyde	Robert Louis Stevenson		
"The Melting Point of Wax"	The Artist in the Ambulance	Thrice	Myth of Icarus		Retells the story of The Fall of Icarus	
"Misery Loves Company"	State of Euphoria	Anthrax	Misery	Stephen King		
"Moi... Lolita"	Gourmandises	Alizée	Lolita	Vladimir Nabokov		
"Moon over Bourbon Street"	The Dream of the Blue Turtles	Sting	Interview with the Vampire	Anne Rice	About the character Louis de Pointe du Lac.	
"Mr. Raven"		MC Lars	"The Raven"	Edgar Allan Poe		
"The Mule"	Fireball	Deep Purple	Foundation series	Isaac Asimov	Based on the character "The Mule" from the Foundation series.	
"Murders in the Rue Morgue"	Killers	Iron Maiden	"The Murders in the Rue Morgue"	Edgar Allan Poe		
"My Antonia"	Red Dirt Girl	Emmylou Harris with Dave Matthews	My Antonia	Willa Cather	Told from the perspective of the character Jim Burden.	
"Narcissist"	The Libertines	The Libertines	The Picture of Dorian Gray	Oscar Wilde	Loosely based on the character of Dorian Gray.	
"Narnia"	Please Don't Touch!	Steve Hackett	The Chronicles of Narnia	C. S. Lewis		
"The Nature of the Beast"	Every Trick in the Book	Ice Nine Kills	Animal Farm	George Orwell		
"The Necromancer"	Caress of Steel	Rush	The Hobbit	J. R. R. Tolkien		
"Nescio"	Omsk	Nits	De uitvreter	Nescio	Song is mainly inspired by the novella's ending, when protagonist Japi jumps off the Waalbrug. In the song, however, Japi does not drown but is implied to have ended up in Italy.	
"Nice, Nice, Very Nice"	Ambrosia	Ambrosia	Cat's Cradle	Kurt Vonnegut	Lyrics taken almost verbatim from the poem in chapter 2 (and the bridge from the one on chapter 58)	
"No Love Lost"	An Ideal for Living	Joy Division	The House of Dolls	Ka-tzetnik 135633		
"November Rain"	Use Your Illusion I	Guns N' Roses	"Without You"	Del James	The video for "November Rain" is loosely based on the short story "Without You". Axl Rose wrote the introduction to James's 1995 collection The Language of Fear, which included "Without You".	
"The Odyssey"	The Odyssey	Symphony X	The Odyssey	Homer	A seven-part song based on Homer's The Odyssey	
"Of Unsound Mind"	Blessing in Disguise	Metal Church	"The Tell-Tale Heart"	Edgar Allan Poe		
"Off to the Races"	Born to Die	Lana Del Rey	Lolita	Vladimir Nabokov		
"Ol' Evil Eye"	Riddle Box	Insane Clown Posse	"The Tell-Tale Heart"	Edgar Allan Poe		
"One"	...And Justice for All	Metallica	Johnny Got His Gun	Dalton Trumbo		
"Oor Hamlet"	The Words That I Used to Know	Adam McNaughtan	Hamlet	William Shakespeare		
"Orestes"	Mer de Noms	A Perfect Circle	The Libation Bearers	Aeschylus		
"Owen Meaney"	Let's Talk About Feelings	Lagwagon	A Prayer For Owen Meany	John Irving		
"Ozymandias"		Jean-Jacques Burnel	"Ozymandias"	Percy Bysshe Shelley		
"Pantagruel's Nativity"	Acquiring the Taste	Gentle Giant	Gargantua and Pantagruel	François Rabelais		
"Patrick Bateman"		Manic Street Preachers	American Psycho	Bret Easton Ellis		
"Pattern Recognition"	Sonic Nurse	Sonic Youth	Pattern Recognition	William Gibson		
"Paula Ausente (Absent Paula)"	Songs Inspired by Literature, Chapter Two	Marta Gomez	Paula	Isabel Allende		
"Pennsylvania"	Songs Inspired by Literature, Chapter Two	Dee Adams	Songmaster	Orson Scott Card		
"Pennywise"	Pennywise	Pennywise	It	Stephen King	About the character Pennywise.	
"The People in the Attic"	Every Trick in the Book	Ice Nine Kills	The Diary of a Young Girl	Anne Frank		
"Pet Sematary"	Brain Drain	Ramones	Pet Sematary	Stephen King		
"The Phantom of the Opera"	Iron Maiden	Iron Maiden	The Phantom of the Opera	Gaston Leroux		
"A Pict Song"	William Bloke	Billy Bragg	"A Pict Song"	Rudyard Kipling		
"The Plot Sickens"	Every Trick in the Book	Ice Nine Kills	Alive: The Story of the Andes Survivors	Piers Paul Read		
"Popular"	High/Low	Nada Surf	Penny's Guide to Teen-Age Charm and Popularity	Gloria Winters		
"Prince Caspian"	Billy Breathes	Phish	Prince Caspian	C. S. Lewis		
"Quelque chose de Tennessee"	Rock'n'Roll Attitude	Johnny Hallyday	Cat on a Hot Tin Roof	Tennessee Williams		
"Ramble On"	Led Zeppelin II	Led Zeppelin	The Lord of the Rings	J. R. R. Tolkien	Mentions characters and places from Tolkien's The Lord of the Rings, including "Mordor" and "Gollum".	
"Rebecca"	Something Real	Meg & Dia	Rebecca	Daphne du Maurier		
"ReJoyce"	After Bathing at Baxter's	Jefferson Airplane	Ulysses	James Joyce		
"Richard Cory"	Sounds of Silence	Paul Simon	"Richard Cory"	Edwin Arlington Robinson		
"Rime of the Ancient Mariner"	Powerslave	Iron Maiden	The Rime of the Ancient Mariner	Samuel Taylor Coleridge		
"Rivendell"	Fly by Night	Rush	The Lord of the Rings	J. R. R. Tolkien	The song is about the fictional valley Rivendell from Tolkien's works.	
"The River"		PJ Harvey	The River	Flannery O'Connor		
"Robot"		Hawkwind	The Robot series	Isaac Asimov	Refers to the Three Laws of Robotics.	
"Romeo and Juliet"	Making Movies	Dire Straits	Romeo and Juliet	William Shakespeare	The Dire Straits songs makes use of certain aspects of Shakespeare's play, as well as elements of some of the play's stage and screen adaptations. It also purposely diverges from the play's plot and characterizations in certain respects (such as Juliet's reaction to being approached by Romeo).	
"Rusty James"	¡Uno!	Green Day	Rumble Fish	S. E. Hinton	The song is named for the protagonist of the novel.	
"Sailing to Philadelphia"	Sailing to Philadelphia	Mark Knopfler	Mason & Dixon	Thomas Pynchon		
"Saint Veronika"	Billy Talent III	Billy Talent	Veronika Decides to Die	Paulo Coelho		
"Samson"	Songs; Begin to Hope	Regina Spektor	The Book of Judges from the Hebrew Bible and the Christian Old Testament		References the biblical story of Samson and Delilah.	
"Scentless Apprentice"	In Utero	Nirvana	Perfume: The Story of a Murderer	Patrick Süskind		
"The Sensual World"	The Sensual World	Kate Bush	Ulysses	James Joyce	The 1989 Kate Bush song The Sensual World was based on the closing paragraphs of Ulysses. However, the Joyce estate was unwilling to allow direct use of Joyce's words at that time, so she altered the lyrics. By 2011, the Joyce estate was open to licensing his work to her, so she re-worked that song as Flower of the Mountain, using Molly Bloom's soliloquy from Ulysses.	
"Shadows and Tall Trees"	Boy	U2	Lord of the Flies	William Golding		
"Sigh No More"	Sigh No More	Mumford and Sons	Much Ado About Nothing	William Shakespeare		
"Sirens of Titan"	Modern Times	Al Stewart	The Sirens of Titan	Kurt Vonnegut		
"A Skeleton in the Closet"	Among the Living	Anthrax	Apt Pupil	Stephen King		
"So Said Kay"	Coastal	The Field Mice	Desert of the Heart	Jane Rule	The song is based on Donna Deitch's 1985 film Desert Hearts, which is an adaptation of Rule's novel.	
"Soma"	Is This It	The Strokes	Brave New World	Aldous Huxley	Refers to the fictional drug used in Brave New World.	
"Song For Clay"	A Weekend in the City	Bloc Party	Less than Zero	Bret Easton Ellis		
"The Stand (Prophecy)"	Declaration	The Alarm	The Stand	Stephen King		
"Star-Crossed Enemies"	Every Trick in the Book	Ice Nine Kills	Romeo and Juliet	William Shakespeare		
"Steppenwolf"	Astounding Sounds, Amazing Music	Hawkwind	Steppenwolf	Hermann Hesse		
"Still Life"	Piece of Mind	Iron Maiden	"The Inhabitant of the Lake"	Ramsey Campbell		
"The Stranger"		Tuxedomoon	The Stranger	Albert Camus		
"Such a Shame"	It's My Life	Talk Talk	The Dice Man	Luke Rhinehart		
"Sweet Thursday"	Songs We Sing	Matt Costa	Sweet Thursday	John Steinbeck		
"Sympathy for the Devil"	Beggars Banquet	The Rolling Stones	The Master and Margarita	Mikhail Bulgakov		
"The Tain"	The Tain	The Decemberists	"Táin Bó Cúailnge"			
"Tales of Brave Ulysses"	Disraeli Gears	Cream	The Odyssey	Homer		
"Tea in the Sahara"	Synchronicity	The Police	The Sheltering Sky	Paul Bowles	King Crimson also has an instrumental called "The Sheltering Sky", named for the same book.	
"Tell Your Story Walking"	A Bird Flies Out	Deb Talan	Motherless Brooklyn	Jonathan Lethem		
"Tess-Timony"	Every Trick in the Book	Ice Nine Kills	Tess of the d'Urbervilles	Thomas Hardy		
"Thieves in the Night"	Mos Def & Talib Kweli Are Black Star	Black Star	The Bluest Eye	Toni Morrison	Talib Kweli wrote in the album's liner notes that The Bluest Eye "...struck me as one of the truest critiques of our society, and I read that in high school when I was 15 years old. I think it is especially true in the world of hip-hop, because we get blinded by these illusions."	
"The Thing That Should Not Be"	Master of Puppets	Metallica	The Call of Cthulhu	H. P. Lovecraft		
"Three Sisters"	Liberation	The Divine Comedy	Three Sisters	Anton Chekhov		
"Time to Dance"		Panic! at the Disco	Invisible Monsters	Chuck Palahniuk		
"To Tame a Land"	Piece of Mind	Iron Maiden	Dune	Frank Herbert		
"tolerate it"	Evermore	Taylor Swift	Rebecca	Daphne du Maurier		
"The Tomahawk Kid"		Alex Harvey	Treasure Island	Robert Louis Stevenson		
"Tread Softly"	Songs Inspired by Literature, Chapter Two	Eileen Laverty	"He Wishes for the Cloths of Heaven"	W. B. Yeats		
"The Trooper"	Piece of Mind	Iron Maiden	"The Charge of the Light Brigade"	Alfred, Lord Tennyson		
"Turn! Turn! Turn!"		Pete Seeger	The Book of Ecclesiastes from the Hebrew Bible and the Christian Old Testament		Notably covered by The Byrds; Takes its lyrics from chapter three of the Book of Ecclesiastes	
"T'Was Her Hunger Brought Me Down"	Songs Inspired by Literature, Chapter One	Anny Celsi	Sister Carrie	Theodore Dreiser		
"United States of Eurasia"	The Resistance	Muse	Nineteen Eighty-Four	George Orwell		
"The Veldt"	Album Title Goes Here	Deadmau5	The Veldt	Ray Bradbury		
"Venus in Furs"	The Velvet Underground & Nico	The Velvet Underground	Venus in Furs	Leopold von Sacher-Masoch		
"Walking on the Chinese Wall"	Chinese Wall	Philip Bailey	Dream of the Red Chamber	Cao Xueqin		
"We Are the Dead"	Diamond Dogs	David Bowie	Nineteen Eighty-Four	George Orwell	One of several songs Bowie wrote about Nineteen Eighty-Four	
"When the War Came"		The Decemberists	Hunger	Elise Blackwell		
"White Rabbit"	Surrealistic Pillow	Jefferson Airplane	Alice in Wonderland	Lewis Carroll		
"William, It Was Really Nothing"	Hatful of Hollow	The Smiths	Billy Liar	Keith Waterhouse		
"Willie Burke Sherwood"	R.A.P. Music	Killer Mike	Lord of the Flies	William Golding		
"Windmills"	Dulcinea	Toad the Wet Sprocket	Don Quixote	Miguel de Cervantes		
"Winston Smith Takes It on the Jaw"	Oblivion	Utopia	Nineteen Eighty-Four	George Orwell		
"Wuthering Heights"	The Kick Inside	Kate Bush	Wuthering Heights	Emily Brontë		
"Wonderland"	1989	Taylor Swift	Alice's Adventures in Wonderland	Lewis Carroll		
"Xanadu"	A Farewell to Kings	Rush	"Kubla Khan"	Samuel Taylor Coleridge		
"Yes!"	Naked	Amber	Ulysses	James Joyce	Lyrics include part of Molly Bloom's soliloquy	
"Don Quixote"	Face the Sun	Seventeen	Don Quixote	Miguel de Cervantes		

== See also ==
- List of songs based on a film
- Wizard rock
