= Ice Nine Kills discography =

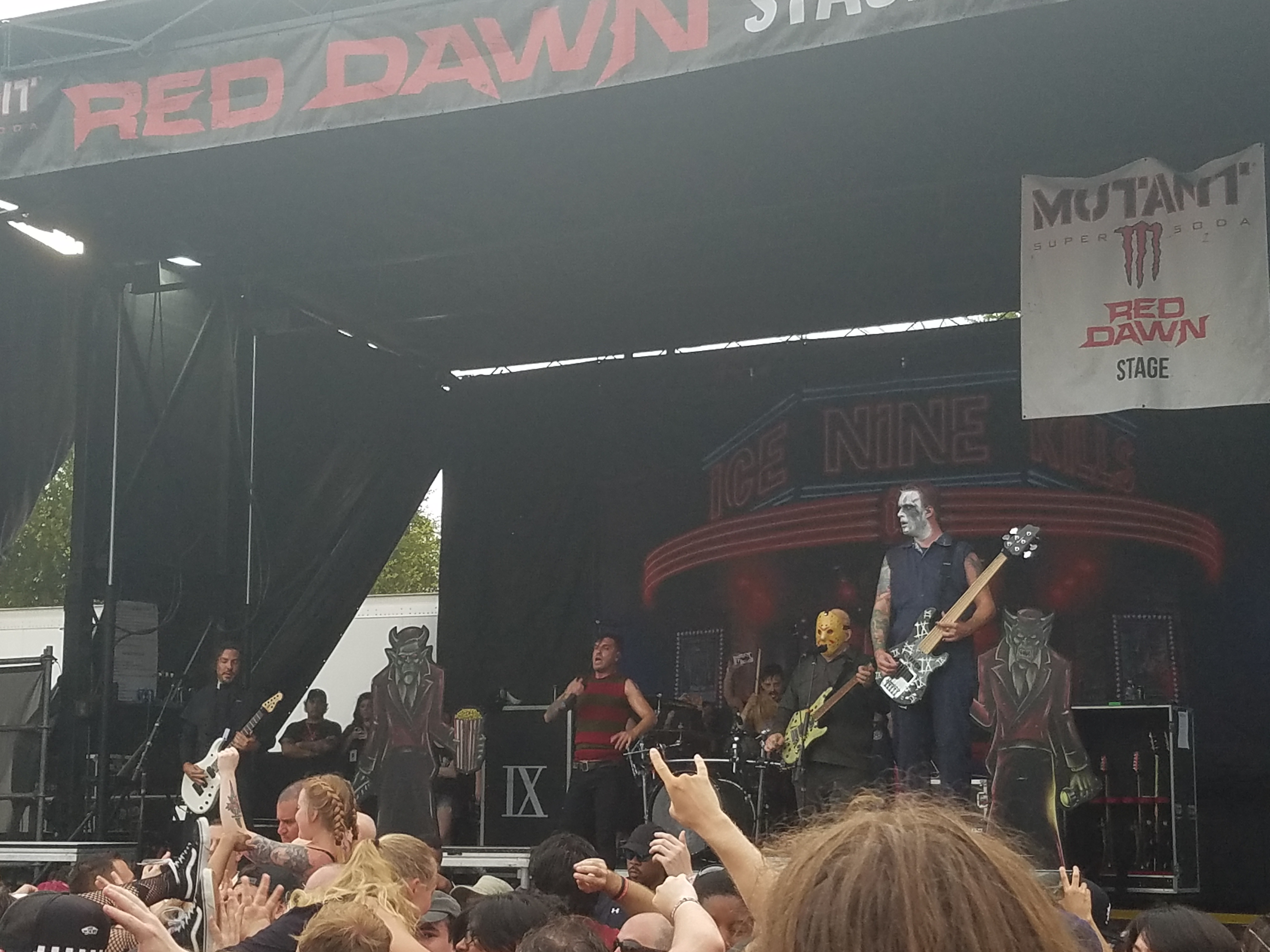
- Ice Nine Kills performing in 2018
- Studio albums: 6
- EPs: 6
- Live albums: 3
- Singles: 26
- Music videos: 34
- Demos: 1

The discography of American heavy metal band Ice Nine Kills consists of six studio albums, six EPs, three live albums, one demo, twenty-six singles and thirty-four music videos.

== Albums ==
=== Studio albums ===
List of studio albums with selected chart positions.
Title	Album details	Peak chart positions						
Title	Album details	US	AUS	CAN	GER	SCO	UK Sales	UK Rock
Last Chance to Make Amends	Released: April 20, 2006; Label: Self-released; Formats: CD	—	—	—	—	—	—	—
Safe Is Just a Shadow	Released: July 2, 2010; Label: Red Blue; Formats: CD, DL	—	—	—	—	—	—	—
The Predator Becomes the Prey	Released: January 20, 2014; Label: Fearless, Outerloop; Formats: CD, DL	153	—	—	—	—	—	—
Every Trick in the Book	Released: December 4, 2015; Label: Fearless; Formats: CD, LP, DL	122	—	—	–	—	—	—
The Silver Scream	Released: October 5, 2018; Label: Fearless; Formats: CD, LP, DL	29	—	—	—	—	— (Note: The Silver Scream did not enter the Uk Album Sales Chart, but peaked at number 64 on the UK Album Downloads Chart.)	14
The Silver Scream 2: Welcome to Horrorwood	Released: October 15, 2021; Label: Fearless; Formats: CD, LP, CS, DL	18	35	92	58	70	54	11
The Silver Scream 3: Every Flick in the Book	Scheduled: 2027; Label: Fearless; Formats: CD, LP, CS, DL	—	—	—	—	—	—	—
"—" denotes a recording that did not chart or was not released in that territory.

=== Demos ===
List of demo releases
Title	Album details
The Pop-Punk Ska Years	Recorded: 2002; Released: June 15, 2009; Label: Self-released; Formats: CD

=== Live Albums ===
List of live releases
Title	Album details
I Heard They Kill Live	Recorded: 2020; Released: October 30, 2020; Label: Fearless; Formats: Digital download, CD, vinyl
Live In Riverside	Recorded: August 29, 2023; Released: April 30, 2024; Label: Fearless; Formats: Digital download
I Heard They Kill Live 2	Recorded: November 17, 2022; Released: June 6, 2025; Label: Fearless; Formats: Digital download, vinyl

== EPs ==
List of EPs with selected chart positions
Title	EP details
The Burning	Released: November 9, 2007; Label: Red Blue; Formats: CD, digital download
2 Song Acoustic	Released: January 13, 2009; Label: Self-released; Formats: Digital download
The Predator	Released: January 15, 2013; Label: Self-released; Formats: CD, digital download
Undead & Unplugged: Live From the Overlook Hotel	Released: June 26, 2020; Label: Fearless
Live From Riverside	Released: April 30, 2024; Label: Fearless/Concord
A Very Vicious Christmas	Released: November 9, 2026; Label: Fearless/Concord

== Singles ==
=== As lead artist ===
List of singles as lead artist, showing year released and album name
Title	Year	Peak chart positions					Certifications	Album
Title	Year	US Main.	US Hard Rock Digi.	US Hot Hard Rock	US Rock	UK Sales	Certifications	Album
"The Product of Hate"	2013	—	—	—	—	—		The Predator Becomes the Prey
"The Power in Belief"	2014	—	—	—	—	—		The Predator Becomes the Prey
"Me, Myself & Hyde"	2015	—	—	—	—	—		Every Trick in the Book
"Enjoy Your Slay" (featuring Sam Kubrick of Shields)	2017	—	—	—	—	—		The Silver Scream
"The American Nightmare"	2018	—	—	—	—	—		The Silver Scream
"Thank God It's Friday"	2018	—	21	—	—	—		The Silver Scream
"A Grave Mistake"	2018	9	18	—	—	—	RIAA: Gold	The Silver Scream
"Savages"	2019	16	—	—	—	—		The Silver Scream
"Can't Help Falling in Love" originally performed by Elvis Presley	2021	—	—	—	—	—		Non-album singles
"Jason's Mom"	2021	—	—	—	—	—		Non-album singles
"Hip to Be Scared" (featuring Jacoby Shaddix)	2021	47	2	5	—	—		The Silver Scream 2: Welcome to Horrorwood
"Assault & Batteries"	2021	—	—	24	—	—		The Silver Scream 2: Welcome to Horrorwood
"Rainy Day"	2021	14	—	20	—	—		The Silver Scream 2: Welcome to Horrorwood
"Funeral Derangements"	2021	—	—	7	—	—		The Silver Scream 2: Welcome to Horrorwood
"Take Your Pick" (featuring George "Corpsegrinder" Fisher)	2022	—	—	21	—	—		The Silver Scream 2: Welcome to Horrorwood
"Hunting Season"	2022	—	9	18	—	—		Non-album single
"The Shower Scene"	2022	18	—	9	—	—		The Silver Scream 2: Welcome to Horrorwood
"Welcome to Horrorwood"	2023	—	—	13	—	—		The Silver Scream 2: Welcome to Horrorwood
"Meat & Greet"	2023	—	5	10	—	—		The Silver Scream 2: Welcome to Horrorwood
"Walking On Sunshine" (featuring Reel Big Fish) originally performed by Katrina and the Waves	2024	—	—	—	—	—		American Psycho (From The "American Psycho" Comic Series Soundtrack)
"A Work of Art"	2024	—	2	3	—	71		TBA
"The Great Unknown"	2025	9	7	18	—	—		TBA
"The Laugh Track"	2025	—	1	4	34	89		TBA
"Twisting the Knife" (from Scream 7) (featuring Mckenna Grace)	2026	1	1	1	31	28		TBA
"Hell or High Slaughter" (from Ready or Not 2: Here I Come) (as Grave Diggler)	2026	—	—	—	—	—		TBA
"Play Dead" (from Dead by Daylight)	2026	—	—	4	—	—		TBA
"—" denotes a recording that did not chart or was not released in that territory.

=== As featured artist ===
List of singles, with selected chart positions, showing year released and album name
Year	Song	Peak chart positions			Album
Year	Song	US Main. Rock	US Hard Rock Digi.	US Air.	Album
2020	"Adrenaline" (Zero 9:36 featuring Ice Nine Kills)	3	—	—	...If You Don't Save Yourself
2020	"Heart of a Champion (Remix)" (Hollywood Undead featuring Papa Roach and Ice Nine Kills)	—	16	—	New Empire, Vol. 2
2021	"Envy" (Twiztid and Ice Nine Kills)	32	—	—	Unlikely Prescription
2022	"The Retaliators (21 Bullets)" (The Retaliators feat. Mötley Crüe, Asking Alexandria, Ice Nine Kills and From Ashes To New)	15	—	47	The Retaliators
2024	"Mad" (TX2 and Ice Nine Kills)	—	—	—	Cruel World
"—" denotes a recording that did not chart or was not released in that territory.

== Other charted songs ==
List of singles as lead artist, showing year released and album name
Title	Year	Peak chart positions	Album
Title	Year	US Hot Hard Rock	Album
"A Rash Decision"	2021	18	The Silver Scream 2: Welcome To Horrorwood
"The Box" (featuring Brandon Saller and Ryan Kirby)	2021	23	The Silver Scream 2: Welcome To Horrorwood
"Ex-Mortis"	2021	25	The Silver Scream 2: Welcome To Horrorwood

== Other releases ==
List of songs that were not released as singles, showing year released and album name
Song	Year	Album
"Cryin'" originally performed by Aerosmith	2009	The Gauntlet Compilation 2009
"Good Riddance (Time of Your Life)" originally performed by Green Day	2014	Punk Goes 90s Vol. 2
"Animals" (originally performed by Maroon 5)	2015	Punk Goes Pop Vol. 6
"I Don't Wanna Live Forever" originally performed by ZAYN & Taylor Swift	2017	Punk Goes Pop Vol. 7

== Music videos ==
List of music videos
Title	Year	Director(s)	Album
"Seventeen"	2003		The Pop-Punk Ska Years
"The People Under the Stairs"	2011	Scott Hansen	Safe Is Just A Shadow
"Someone Like You" (Adele cover)	2012	Timothy van Niekerk	The Predator (EP)
"The Coffin Is Moving"	2013	Josiah Moore	The Predator (EP)
"Let's Bury the Hatchet... In Your Head"	2014	Josiah Moore	The Predator Becomes the Prey
"The Fastest Way to a Girl's Heart Is Through Her Ribcage"	2014	Josiah Moore	The Predator Becomes the Prey
"Communion of the Cursed"	2015	Dan Kennedy & Rasa Partin	Every Trick in the Book
"Hell in the Hallways"	2015	Dan Kennedy & Rasa Partin	Every Trick in the Book
"Animals"	2015	Josiah Moore	Punk Goes Pop Vol. 6
"The Nature of the Beast"	2017	Dan Kennedy, Rasa Partin & Daniel Hourian	Every Trick in the Book
"I Don’t Wanna Live Forever"	2017	Josiah Moore	Punk Goes Pop Vol. 7
"The American Nightmare"	2018	Daniel Hourian	The Silver Scream
"Thank God It's Friday"	2018	Daniel Hourian	The Silver Scream
"A Grave Mistake"	2018	Daniel Hourian	The Silver Scream
"Stabbing in the Dark"	2018	Daniel Hourian	The Silver Scream
"Merry Axe-Mas"	2018	Daniel Hourian	The Silver Scream
"It Is the End"	2019	Daniel Hourian	The Silver Scream
"Savages"	2019	Zev Deans	The Silver Scream
"Can't Help Falling in Love"	2021	Myles Erfurth	Non-album single
"Hip to Be Scared" (featuring Jacoby Shaddix)	2021	Jensen Noen	The Silver Scream 2: Welcome To Horrorwood
"Assault & Batteries"	2021	Jensen Noen	The Silver Scream 2: Welcome To Horrorwood
"Rainy Day"	2021	Jensen Noen	The Silver Scream 2: Welcome To Horrorwood
"Funeral Derangements"	2021	Jensen Noen	The Silver Scream 2: Welcome To Horrorwood
"Take Your Pick" (featuring Corpsegrinder)	2022	Dewald de la Rey	The Silver Scream 2: Welcome To Horrorwood
"The Shower Scene"	2022	Jensen Noen	The Silver Scream 2: Welcome To Horrorwood
"Welcome To Horrorwood"	2023	Jensen Noen	The Silver Scream 2: Welcome To Horrorwood
"Meat & Greet"	2023	Jensen Noen	The Silver Scream 2: Welcome To Horrorwood
"Walking On Sunshine"	2024	Drake Booth	Non-album singles
"A Work of Art"	2024	Jensen Noen	Non-album singles
"The Great Unknown"	2025	Jensen Noen	Non-album singles
"The Laugh Track"	2025	Jensen Noen	Non-album singles
"Twisting the Knife" (Parts 1 & 2) (featuring Mckenna Grace)	2026	Jensen Noen	Non-album singles
"Hell or High Slaughter" (as Grave Diggler)	2026	Myles Erfurth	Non-album singles
"Play Dead"	2026	Jensen Noen	Non-album singles

== Collaborations ==
Year	Song	Album	Artist
2012	"Can't Hear a Sound" (feat. Spencer Charnas)	The Blackout EP	Saline
2013	"Can't Hear a Sound" (feat. Spencer Charnas)	The Blackout EP	Saline
2013	"Calloused" (feat. Spencer Charnas)	Depth/Distance EP	War Torn Angel
2013	"The Lucifer Effect" (feat. Spencer Charnas & Justin DeBliek)	The Common Ground EP	Listen for the Light
2014	"Listen Clearly" (feat. Spencer Charnas)	Season of the Dead	Chasing Safety
2014	"Tempest" (feat. Spencer Charnas)	Seasons EP	We the Machine
2014	"Where You Belong" (feat. Spencer Charnas & Chasing Safety)	Single	Youth in Revolt
2014	"Captive" (feat. Spencer Charnas)	Guardian EP	Take the Throne
2014	"Ghosts" (feat. Spencer Charnas)	Single	Ira Hill
2014	"Thought Desire" (feat. Spencer Charnas)	Inspire Yourself EP	Infamous
2015	"On My Own" (feat. Spencer Charnas)	The Flame EP	Vanity Strikes
2015	"From the Depths" (feat. Spencer Charnas)	The Tyrant Will Fall EP	Tides of Deception
2015	"Vultures" (feat. Spencer Charnas)	Shadowland, Vol. 2	Straying From Madness
2016	"The Stone" (feat. Spencer Charnas)	Single	Sins of Sincerity
2016	"Out Come the Wolves" (feat. Spencer Charnas)	Single	End of Autumn
2016	"Anchor Ankle" (feat. Spencer Charnas)	Single	Another Day Drowning
2017	"Paper House" (feat. Spencer Charnas)	Sheep to Wolves	Vanish
2017	"RAGE" (feat. Spencer Charnas)	What Keeps Me Up At Night	Stories Through Storms
2018	"A Million Years" (feat. Spencer Charnas)	#Sadtrap	Shaggy Not Scoob
2018	"Samaritan" (feat. Spencer Charnas)	Single	Version Eighth
2018	"White Embers" (feat. Spencer Charnas)	Life in Exile	Shields
2018	"Passengers" (feat. Spencer Charnas)	Single	ARSNS
2019	"The Change" (feat. Spencer Charnas)	The Change	Awake At Last
2019	"Boogeyman" (feat. Spencer Charnas)	Single	TERRORBYTE
2019	"Countess" (feat. Spencer Charnas)	Bathory	The Dead Are Living
2019	"Rapid Shadows" (feat. Spencer Charnas)	I Am the Sea	Version Eight
2019	"Damien" (feat. Spencer Charnas)	Single	Flip the Switch
2020	"Anti-Venom" (feat. Justin DeBlieck)	Single	Execution Day
2020	"Armageddon" (feat. Spencer Charnas)	Single	Eunoia
2023	"Cheers to goodbye" (feat. Spencer Charnas)	Out of the Shadows	Escape the Fate
2024	"Hate You Sober" (feat. Ice Nine Kills)	Youth	Mest
