= Safe Is Just a Shadow =

Studio album by Ice Nine Kills
- Released: July 12, 2010
- Genres: Metalcore; post-hardcore
- Length: 35:32; 35:50 (Re-Shadowed and Re-Recorded)
- Labels: Red Blue; Independent (Re-Shadowed and Re-Recorded)

Ice Nine Kills chronology
Last Chance to Make Amends (2006)	Safe Is Just a Shadow (2010)	The Predator (2013)

Alternative cover
- 2017 re-release cover

Ice Nine Kills chronology
Every Trick in the Book (2015)	Safe Is Just a Shadow (Re-Shadowed and Re-Recorded) (2017)	The Silver Scream (2018)

Safe Is Just a Shadow is the second studio album by heavy metal band Ice Nine Kills. The album was originally released on July 12, 2010, but was re-recorded and released in 2017, packaged as Safe Is Just a Shadow (Re-Shadowed and Re-Recorded).

== Background ==
The album was re-released after being re-recorded on January 6, 2017. Vocalist Spencer Charnas described the reasoning, stating "With the evolution of our skills as musicians, and the original producer, Steve Sopchak, having established himself at the top of his craft, we felt this was a perfect time to re-record the album and give it that extra attention that it always deserved. We’ve also repackaged the album with the impressive Toby Fraser produced artwork that was originally supposed to accompany the release".

== Track listing ==
Original recording:

No.	Title	Length
1.	"Proximity Mines in the Complex"	3:26
2.	"Buildings Burn, People Die"	3:05
3.	"Chris Brown's Latest Hit"	3:34
4.	"Newton's Third Law of Knives to the Back"	3:18
5.	"So This Is My Future"	3:16
6.	"Acceptance in the Waves"	3:12
7.	"Red Sky Warning"	4:02
8.	"The People Under the Stairs"	3:20
9.	"The Greatest Story Ever Told"	4:22
10.	"Evidence on Fire"	3:57
Total length:		35:32

== Personnel ==
2010 issue:

- Spencer Charnas – vocals, keyboards
- Dave Sieling – vocals
- Justin "JD" DeBlieck – guitar, keyboards, vocals, sound design, production
- Shane Bisnett – bass, vocals
- Justin Morrow – guitar
- Conor Sullivan – drums

2017 re-recording:

- Spencer Charnas – vocals, keyboards
- Justin "JD" DeBlieck – guitar, keyboards, programming, vocals, sound design, production
- Justin Morrow – bass, guitar
- Conor Sullivan – drums

== Charts ==
2017 version

Chart (2017)	Peak position
US Heatseekers Albums (Billboard)	1
US Top Hard Rock Albums (Billboard)	3
US Independent Albums (Billboard)	6
US Top Rock Albums (Billboard)	13
