= List of songs based on a film =

This is a list of songs partly or entirely based on a film. The list does not include songs that are related to a film as part of its soundtrack, original or not.

List of songs based on a film
Song	Artist	Film	Ref.
"2HB"	Roxy Music	Casablanca	
"Alice"	Avril Lavigne	Alice in Wonderland	
"The American Nightmare"	Ice Nine Kills	A Nightmare on Elm Street	
"Attack of the Fifty-Foot Woman"	The Tubes	Attack of the 50 Foot Woman	
"Attack Ships on Fire"	Revolting Cocks	Blade Runner	
"Big Tears"	Elvis Costello	Targets	
"Brownsville Girl"	Bob Dylan	The Gunfighter	
"Calvero"	The Pillows	Limelight	
"Carlotta Valdez"	Harvey Danger	Vertigo	
"Chain Saw"	The Ramones	The Texas Chain Saw Massacre	
"Children of the Damned"	Iron Maiden	Village of the Damned	
"Cinderella Man"	Rush	Mr. Deeds Goes to Town	
"The Clansman"	Iron Maiden	Braveheart	
"The Crimson Ghost"	Misfits	The Crimson Ghost	
"Dawn of the Dead"	Michale Graves	Dawn of the Dead	
"Day of the Dead"	Misfits	Day of the Dead	
"Dead by Dawn"	Deicide	The Evil Dead	
"Death of an Interior Decorator"	Death Cab for Cutie	Interiors	
"Debaser"	Pixies	Un Chien Andalou	
"DNA"	Gavin Dunne	Prometheus	
"Dream Warriors"	Dokken	A Nightmare on Elm Street 3: Dream Warriors	
"The Edge of Darkness"	Iron Maiden	Apocalypse Now	
"Early Sunsets Over Monroeville"	My Chemical Romance	Dawn of the Dead	
"Enjoy Your Slay"	Ice Nine Kills	The Shining	
"Eyes Without a Face"	Billy Idol	Eyes Without a Face	
"Evil Dead"	Death	The Evil Dead	
"Fidelity"	Regina Spektor	High Fidelity	
"Fitzcarraldo"	The Frames	Fitzcarraldo	
"Forrest Gump"	Frank Ocean	Forrest Gump	
"Freak Flag"	Ice Nine Kills	The Devil's Rejects	
"From Now On We Are Enemies"	Fall Out Boy	Amadeus	
"Ghost of Frankenstein"	Misfits	The Ghost of Frankenstein	
"A Girl Like You"	The Smithereens	Say Anything...	
"Godzilla"	Blue Öyster Cult	Godzilla	
"Gold Guns Girls"	Metric	Scarface	
"A Grave Mistake"	Ice Nine Kills	The Crow	
"Gump"	"Weird Al" Yankovic	Forrest Gump	
"Haddonfield"	Wednesday 13	Halloween	
"Heartlight"	Neil Diamond	E.T. the Extra-Terrestrial	
"Hello McFly"	Relient K	Back to the Future	
"Hier kommt Alex"	Die Toten Hosen	A Clockwork Orange	
"Home"	Breaking Benjamin	The Wonderful Wizard of Oz	
"How I Go"	Yellowcard	Big Fish	
"I Can Transform Ya"	Chris Brown, Lil Wayne & Swizz Beatz	Transformers film series	
"Imitation of Life"	R.E.M.	Imitation of Life	
"It is the End"	Ice Nine Kills	It	
"Jaws"	Lemon Demon	Jaws	
"The Jig Is Up"	Ice Nine Kills	Saw	
"Jurassic Park"	"Weird Al" Yankovic	Jurassic Park	
"The Kelly Affair"	be your own PET	Beyond the Valley of the Dolls	
"Key Largo"	Bertie Higgins	Key Largo	
"King Kong Song"	Abba	King Kong	
"Kirsten Supine"	Swans	Melancholia	
"Land of the Dead"	Misfits	Land of the Dead	
"Leon"	The Japanese House	Léon: The Professional	
"Lost Boys"	The 69 Eyes	The Lost Boys	
"Love Bites"	Ice Nine Kills	An American Werewolf in London	
"Man on the Edge"	Iron Maiden	Falling Down	
"Matilda"	Alt-J	Léon: The Professional	
"Meet Me in Montauk"	Circa Survive	Eternal Sunshine of the Spotless Mind	
"Merry Axe-mas"	Ice Nine Kills	Silent Night, Deadly Night	
"Mortopsycho Nightmare"	Bob Dylan	Psycho	
"A New Hope"	Blink-182	Star Wars Episode IV: A New Hope	
"Night of the Living Dead"	Misfits	Night of the Living Dead	
"Nosferatu"	Hugh Cornwell	Nosferatu, eine Symphonie des Grauens	
"Ode to a Superhero"	"Weird Al" Yankovic	Spider-Man	
"Of Wolf and Man"	Metallica	The Wolfen	
"One"	Metallica	Johnny Got His Gun	
"Ouch"	be your own PET	Dawn of the Dead	
"Out of the Silent Planet"	Iron Maiden	Forbidden Planet	
"Raped in Hatred by Vines of Thorn"	The Black Dahlia Murder	The Evil Dead	
"Return of the Fly"	Misfits	Return of the Fly	
"Rocking the Boat"	Ice Nine Kills	Jaws	
"The Saga Begins"	"Weird Al" Yankovic	Star Wars: Episode I – The Phantom Menace	
"Savages"	Ice Nine Kills	The Texas Chain Saw Massacre	
"Scissorhands (The Last Snow)"	Motionless in White	Edward Scissorhands	
"The Seventh Seal"	Scott Walker	The Seventh Seal	
"Shining"	Misfits	Poltergeist	
"Skinny Blues"	The Pillows	The Lost Weekend	
"So Long, Astoria"	The Ataris	The Goonies	
"Stabbing in the Dark"	Ice Nine Kills	Halloween	
"Stranger in Town"	Toto	Whistle Down the Wind	
"Sweep the Leg"	No More Kings	The Karate Kid	
"Thank God It's Friday"	Ice Nine Kills	Friday the 13th	
"Twilight of the Dead"	Misfits	Land of the Dead	
"The Union Forever"	The White Stripes	Citizen Kane	
"Welcome Home (Sanitarium)"	Metallica	One Flew Over the Cuckoo's Nest	
"Where Eagles Dare"	Iron Maiden	Where Eagles Dare	
"Wind It Up"	Gwen Stefani	The Sound of Music	
"The Wicker Man"	Iron Maiden	The Wicker Man	
"The World in My Hands"	Ice Nine Kills	Edward Scissorhands	
"Year 3000"	Busted	Back to the Future trilogy	
"Yoda"	"Weird Al" Yankovic	The Empire Strikes Back	
"Youngster (Kent Arrow)"	The Pillows	Quadrophenia	
"Your Number's Up"	Ice Nine Kills	Scream	

== Music video ==
In certain cases, only the music video includes elements inspired by given films. Examples include "Telephone" by Lady Gaga and Beyoncé containing references to Kill Bill and "Kill Bill (킬빌)" by Brown Eyed Girls, with visual references to the same film.

== See also ==
Albums based on films

- Music Inspired by The Chronicles of Narnia: The Lion, the Witch and the Wardrobe, an album of songs by various artists inspired by the film

Other

- List of songs that retell a work of literature
