= The Predator (EP) =

EP by Ice Nine Kills
- Released: January 15, 2013
- Genres: Metalcore; post-hardcore
- Length: 18:05
- Label: Self-released

Ice Nine Kills chronology
Safe Is Just a Shadow (2010)	The Predator (2013)	The Predator Becomes the Prey (2014)

Singles from The Predator
- 1. "Someone Like You" Released: May 21, 2012; 2. "The Coffin Is Moving" Released: November 22, 2012; 3. "What I Never Learned in Study Hall" Released: December 22, 2012

The Predator is the third EP by American metalcore band Ice Nine Kills and was self-released by the band on January 15, 2013. The EP debuted at No. 9 on the Billboard Heatseekers chart.

It is the only album to feature Steve Koch as bassist and backup singer after his departure in 2013, and the last album to feature Justin Morrow as rhythm guitarist; he would switch to bass guitar and backing vocals (on live performance only) while still playing rhythm guitar in studio in 2013.

The tracks "The Coffin Is Moving" and "What I Never Learned in Study Hall" later would be featured on the band's 2014 album The Predator Becomes the Prey.

The track "What I Never Learned in Study Hall" was later re-recorded acoustically for Take Action. Vol. 11 making it similar to the song's predecessors "What I Really Learned in Study Hall" and "What I Should Have Learned in Study Hall". Unlike the original version, the acoustic version did not feature Tyler Carter as guest vocalist, but instead featured former Kid's Jackson Summer vocalist Kate Ellen Dean.

== Track listing ==
No.	Title	Length
1.	"The Coffin Is Moving"	3:12
2.	"Father's Day"	3:36
3.	"What I Never Learned in Study Hall" (featuring Tyler Carter of Issues)	3:34
4.	"A Reptile's Dysfunction"	3:08
5.	"Someone Like You" (Adele cover)	4:35

== Personnel ==
- Spencer Charnas - lead vocals, piano on "A Reptile's Dysfunction"
- Justin "JD" DeBlieck - lead guitar, lead vocals
- Justin Morrow - rhythm guitar
- Steve Koch - bass guitar, backing vocals
- Connor Sullivan - drums
- Steve Sopchak - producer, engineer, mixing

== Charts ==
Chart (2013)	Peak position
US Heatseekers Albums (Billboard)	9
US Independent Albums (Billboard)	38
