= The Silver Scream 2: Welcome to Horrorwood =

Studio album by Ice Nine Kills
- Released: October 15, 2021
- Recorded: 2020
- Genres: Metalcore; melodic metalcore
- Length: 47:12
- Label: Fearless
- Producer: Drew Fulk

Ice Nine Kills chronology
The Silver Scream (2018)	The Silver Scream 2: Welcome to Horrorwood (2021)	A Very Vicious Christmas (2026)

Singles from The Silver Scream 2: Welcome to Horrorwood
- 1. "Hip to Be Scared" Released: July 9, 2021; 2. "Assault & Batteries" Released: August 9, 2021; 3. "Rainy Day" Released: September 9, 2021; 4. "Funeral Derangements" Released: October 9, 2021; 5. "Take Your Pick" Released: February 14, 2022; 6. "The Shower Scene" Released: July 29, 2022; 7. "Welcome to Horrorwood" Released: January 13, 2023

The Silver Scream 2: Welcome to Horrorwood (also known as Welcome to Horrorwood: The Silver Scream 2 or either simply Welcome to Horrorwood or The Silver Scream 2) is the sixth studio album by the American heavy metal band Ice Nine Kills, released on October 15, 2021, via Fearless. It is the band's first album to feature bassist Joseph Occhiuti and guitarists Dan Sugarman and Ricky Armellino, and the only album to feature drummer Patrick Galante.

It is a follow-up and sequel to the band's previous album, The Silver Scream, which was inspired by horror films. The album is also inspired by horror films and features guest vocalists such as Jacoby Shaddix, George "Corpsegrinder" Fisher, Brandon Saller, Ryan Kirby and Buddy Nielsen. The album became the band's biggest commercial success, reaching number 18 on the US Billboard 200 and number one on the Hard Rock Albums chart.

== Background ==
On October 5, 2018, the band released their fifth studio album The Silver Scream. Each song on the album was inspired by a horror movie. When teasing the single "Hip to Be Scared", inspired by American Psycho, the title of Ice Nine Kills' new album was listed in the credits as The Silver Scream 2: Welcome to Horrorwood. In an interview with Alternative Press, lead vocalist Spencer Charnas stated:

"In Scream 2, Randy points out that the body count is always bigger,” Charnas explains. “The production is upped on every level. There’s more recording budget or filming budget. We went [into The Silver Scream 2] with that lighthearted attitude that we were going to have fun and see how much crazier we could take this newfound style of taking horror movies and converting it into the Ice Nine Kills treatment."

As with the previous album, each of the videos are based on the films that the tracks were written about, while also having an overall story arc across the sequence of videos.

== Release ==
On the ninth of each month leading up to the album's release, a new single and accompanying video was released to promote the album. On July 9, 2021, the band released the lead single from the album, "Hip to Be Scared". The single features Papa Roach frontman Jacoby Shaddix and was released along with an accompanying music video.

On August 3, 2021, the band released a teaser video featuring the album's track listing, leading fans to predict and speculate the horror/thriller movies that inspired the songs on the album. On August 9, 2021, the band released the second single, "Assault & Batteries", inspired by Child's Play. On September 9, 2021, the band released the third single, "Rainy Day", inspired by Resident Evil. On October 9, 2021, the band released the fourth single, "Funeral Derangements", inspired by Pet Sematary.

The album was released on October 15, 2021. Four months after the album had released, the band released the fifth single from the record, "Take Your Pick" featuring George "Corpsegrinder" Fisher, taking cinematic inspiration from My Bloody Valentine and being released on February 14, 2022, to commemorate Valentine's Day alongside an animated music video. On May 16, 2022, the band released a live video for "The Shower Scene", that the band recorded on "The Trinity of Terror Tour", which the band finished in April along with Black Veil Brides and Motionless in White. This indicated that the song was the next to be released as a single, where the sixth single from the album was officially released on July 29 with a new acoustic rendition.

An official video for "The Shower Scene", taking inspiration from Alfred Hitchcock's Psycho, was released on August 9, 2022. The video features appearances from actors Scout Taylor-Compton, Joe Bob Briggs, and Ricky Dean Logan. The video also features horror YouTube creators, James A. Janisse and Chelsea Rebecca of Dead Meat. The music video narrative across the six released singles feature famous horror actor Bill Moseley as police chief Captain Harris.

== Composition ==
The Silver Scream 2: Welcome to Horrorwood has been described as a metalcore and melodic metalcore album, that experiments with deathcore and emo pop. Blabbermouth.net described the album as "decadent, devious, and fiercely insane, with sardonic wit to spare."

"A Rash Decision" combines metalcore riffs with electronica elements and horns, "Rainy Day" is an industrial metal song, and "Take Your Pick" is a death metal and hardcore punk song. "Welcome to Horrorwood" is a symphonic death metal and pop punk song.

== Reception ==
=== Critical reception ===
Professional ratings
Review scores
Source	Rating
AllMusic	4/5 stars
Distorted Sound	9/10
Hysteria Magazine	8/10
Kerrang!	4/5
Metal Hammer	4/5 stars
New Noise Magazine	4.5/5 stars
Rock Sins	9/10 stars
The Spill Magazine	4.5/5 stars
Upset Magazine	4/5 stars
Wall of Sound	9.5/10

The Silver Scream 2: Welcome to Horrorwood received critical acclaim. Graham Ray of Distorted Sound called the album "heavier, catchier and more cohesive than [the original] The Silver Scream." Hysteria Magazine described the album as "dramatic, thrilling and fast-paced." In a positive review, Jake Richardson of Kerrang! stated "[The Silver Scream 2: Welcome to Horrorwood is] a unique, thrilling and unpredictable record, The Silver Scream 2 has all the makings of an instant horror hit."

To sum up her thoughts on the album, Ali Cooper of Metal Hammer stated "Perfectly capturing the vast soundscapes, emotions and fake blood flowing through each movie stamped with their own metalcore trademark, Ice Nine Kills have crafted a flawless effort so deeply invested in its subject matter that it demands replay after replay… if you dare." Comparing the album to its predecessor, Ashley Gallagher of New Noise Magazine stated "The Silver Scream felt like a collection of tracks while Welcome to Horrorwood was a complete body of work, keeping the listener wanting more after each and every song." Simon Crampton of Rock Sins considered the album to be "a huge step up from their previous work."

Melinda Welsh of The Spill Magazine considered the album to be the "hard core exception to the general rule that “sequels suck”." Dan Harrison of Upset Magazine called the album "a pulpy delight." Comparing the album to movie sequels, Carys Hurcom of Wall of Sound stated "...to reference the film class scene in "Scream 2", it’s not "The Godfather Part II" (universally acknowledged as a superior film to the original), but more of a Terminator 2...in that both are great for different reasons, and will entirely depend on whether you like more understated, subtle texts or more fast, “action-packed” and in your face texts. Whatever your preference, The Silver Scream 2: Welcome To Horrorwood is still a hell of an experience."

=== Accolades ===
Accolades for The Silver Scream 2: Welcome to Horrorwood
Publication	Accolade	Rank	Ref.
Loudwire	The 45 Best Rock + Metal Albums of 2021	45	

== Commercial performance ==
The Silver Scream 2: Welcome to Horrorwood debuted within the Top 20 on the Billboard 200 at number 18, selling 25,000 copies in its first week with 18,000 of which were pure sales. It also was the fifth best selling album and the second best-selling rock album of the week in the United States, only behind Coldplay's Music of the Spheres, as well as topping the US Digital Albums chart. It is the band's biggest commercially successful album on the Billboard charts to date. As of June 2026, The Silver Scream 2: Welcome to Horrorwood has sold 316,000 equivalent album units in the United States.

In the United Kingdom, The Silver Scream 2: Welcome to Horrorwood was the band's second album to chart on the UK Rock & Metal Albums Chart following The Silver Scream, debuting at number 15. It was also the twelfth most downloaded album of the week in the country. When the album was released on physical formats in Europe, it resurfaced on the UK Rock & Metal Albums Chart and peaked at number 11 just missing out on the Top 10. While falling to chart on the UK Albums Chart, it did however debut and peak on the UK Albums Sales Chart and Scottish Albums Chart at number 54 and 70 respectively. It peaked on the UK Physical Albums Chart at number 51. The Silver Scream 2: Welcome to Horrorwood spent a total of three non-consecutive weeks on the UK Rock & Metal Albums Chart.

== Track listing ==
All lyrics written by Spencer Charnas and Steve Sopchak, all music written by Ice Nine Kills, except when noted.

The Silver Scream 2: Welcome to Horrorwood track listing
No.	Title	Writer(s)	Cinematic inspiration	Length
1.	"Opening Night..."			0:42
2.	"Welcome to Horrorwood"	John Feldmann; Spencer Charnas; Ricky Armellino; Joseph Occhiuti; Dan Sugarman; Patrick Galante		3:55
3.	"A Rash Decision"	Feldmann; Charnas; Armellino; Occhiuti; Sugarman; Galante	Cabin Fever	3:31
4.	"Assault & Batteries"		Child's Play	3:28
5.	"The Shower Scene"	Drew Fulk; Charnas; Armellino; Occhiuti; Sugarman; Galante	Psycho	3:11
6.	"Funeral Derangements"	Feldmann; Fulk; Charnas; Armellino; Occhiuti; Sugarman; Galante	Pet Sematary	3:44
7.	"Rainy Day"	Matt Good; Fulk; Charnas; Armellino; Occhiuti; Sugarman; Galante	Resident Evil	3:01
8.	"Hip to Be Scared" (featuring Jacoby Shaddix)	Huey Lewis; Josh Strock; Fulk; Charnas; Armellino; Occhiuti; Sugarman; Galante	American Psycho	3:23
9.	"Take Your Pick" (featuring Corpsegrinder)		My Bloody Valentine	3:17
10.	"The Box" (featuring Brandon Saller and Ryan Kirby)	Brandon Saller; Fulk; Charnas; Armellino; Occhiuti; Sugarman; Galante	Hellraiser	3:35
11.	"F.L.Y." (featuring Buddy Nielsen)		The Fly	3:00
12.	"Wurst Vacation"	Charnas; Armellino; Occhiuti; Sugarman; Galante; Fulk; Strock	Hostel	3:50
13.	"Ex-Mørtis"	Jordon Terrell; Charnas; Armellino; Occhiuti; Sugarman; Galante	The Evil Dead	3:21
14.	"Farewell II Flesh"	Matt Squire; Charnas; Armellino; Occhiuti; Sugarman; Galante	Candyman	5:14
Total length:				47:12

Welcome to Horrorwood: Under Fire (Deluxe Edition)
No.	Title	Cinematic inspiration	Length
15.	"Meat & Greet"	The Silence of the Lambs	3:31
16.	"Rainy Day" (SPLNTR Remix)	Resident Evil	3:06
17.	"The Shower Scene" (acoustic version)	Psycho	3:02
Total length:			56:51

"Deluxe Bloodshed" Bonus Tracks
No.	Title	Length
15.	"Assault & Batteries" (orchestral version)	2:59
16.	"Ex-Mørtis" (orchestral version)	3:16
17.	"The Shower Scene" (acoustic version)	3:02
Total length:		56:29

Welcome To Horrowood: Under Fire (Deluxe Limited Edition)
No.	Title	Length
18.	"Welcome To Horrowood" (orchestral version)	3:55
19.	"A Rash Decision" (orchestral version)	3:37
20.	"Assault & Batteries" (orchestral version)	2:59
21.	"The Shower Scene" (orchestral version)	3:08
22.	"Funeral Derangements" (orchestral version)	3:32
23.	"Rainy Day" (orchestral version)	3:08
24.	"Hip To Be Scared" (orchestral version)	3:23
25.	"Take Your Pick" (orchestral version)	3:04
26.	"The Box" (orchestral version)	3:32
27.	"F.L.Y." (orchestral version)	2:58
28.	"Wurst Vacation" (orchestral version)	3:45
29.	"Ex-Mørtis" (orchestral version)	3:16
30.	"Farewell II Flesh" (orchestral version)	4:47
Total length:		42:24

== Personnel ==
Credits retrieved from album's liner notes.

Ice Nine Kills

- Spencer Charnas – lead vocals
- Ricky Armellino – rhythm guitar, backing vocals
- Joseph Occhiuti – bass, backing vocals, keyboards
- Dan Sugarman – lead guitar, backing vocals
- Patrick Galante – drums, percussion

Additional musicians

- Jacoby Shaddix of Papa Roach – guest vocals (track 8)
- George "Corpsegrinder" Fisher of Cannibal Corpse – guest vocals (track 9)
- Brandon Saller of Atreyu – guest vocals (track 10)
- Ryan Kirby of Fit for a King – guest vocals (track 10)
- Buddy Nielsen of Senses Fail – guest vocals (track 11)
- Drew Fulk – additional vocals (track 12)
- Sarah J. Bartholomew – additional vocals (tracks 2–5, 8–14)
- Nadia Teichmann – additional vocals (track 8)
- Carson Beck – voiceovers (tracks 1, 5)
- Domingo Castillo – voiceovers (track 4)
- Kelly Cordes – voiceovers (track 4)
- Robert Lindsay – voiceovers (track 12)

Production

- Drew Fulk – producer, mixing, mastering, additional programming
- Ice Nine Kills – composition
- Spencer Charnas – lyrics
- Ricky Armellino – additional engineering
- Joseph Occhiuti – additional engineering, additional programming
- Jeff Dunne – mixing
- Francesco Ferrini – orchestration, programming

== Charts ==
=== Weekly charts ===
Weekly chart performance for The Silver Scream 2: Welcome to Horrorwood
Chart (2021)	Peak position
Australian Albums (ARIA)	35
Austrian Albums (Ö3 Austria)	62
Canadian Albums (Billboard)	92
German Albums (Offizielle Top 100)	58
Scottish Albums (Official Charts)	70
UK Digital Albums (OCC)	12
UK Physical Albums (OCC)	51
UK Album Sales (OCC)	54
UK Rock & Metal Albums (Official Charts)	11
US Billboard 200	18
US Independent Albums (Billboard)	2
US Top Album Sales (Billboard)	5
US Top Hard Rock Albums (Billboard)	1
US Top Rock Albums (Billboard)	3

=== Year-end charts ===
Year-end chart performance for The Silver Scream 2: Welcome to Horrorwood
Chart (2021)	Position
US Top Current Album Sales (Billboard)	154
US Top Rock Albums (Billboard)	98
US Top Hard Rock Albums (Billboard)	43

== Release history ==
Release dates and formats for The Silver Scream 2: Welcome to Horrorwood
Region	Date	Format	Label	Ref.
Various	October 15, 2021	CD; cassette; digital download; streaming	Fearless	
Europe	October 29, 2021	CD	Fearless	
Various	December 3, 2021	Vinyl	Fearless	
