= Hannah Fury =

American singer-songwriter

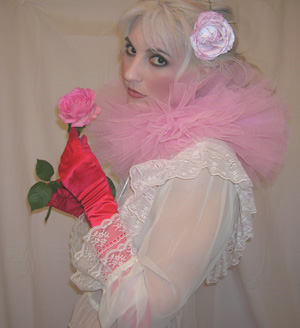

Background information
- Born: Hannah Marie Fury
- Genres: Dark cabaret, ethereal music
- Occupation(s): Musician, vocalist, songwriter, record producer
- Instrument(s): Vocals, piano, keyboards
- Years active: 1998–present
- Labels: MellowTraumatic Recordings
- Website: Mellowtraumatic.com

Hannah Marie Fury is an American singer-songwriter with a following based on her independently produced melancholic recordings inspired by Gregory Maguire's revisionist Oz novel Wicked.

== Career details ==
Fury began the self-teaching process of mastering the piano at the age of 16 after finding inspiration in a song which she described as having coalesced in her mind—naming it "The Vampire Waltz." By the early 1990s she initiated the process of producing and releasing her own music, starting with a four-song demo tape. Eventually the songs from this tape were developed into the self-released 1998 EP Soul Poison, soon followed by the full-length 2000 album, The Thing That Feels, which met with generally favorable critical notices.

Seven years later, in August 2007, she released her second full-length album, and sixth CD overall, Through the Gash. All six of her CDs have been released on her own independent label MellowTraumatic Recordings. Despite not having the support of a major record label, her recordings have gained a devoted following who consistently praise her work.

Noticeably shy of the limelight, Fury has never performed live.

== Musical style ==
For most of her music, Fury has relied on vocals, keyboard and piano. She frequently uses overdubbing of her own voice to create harmonization and occasionally uses other instruments such as bass guitar. Starting with her CD Subterfuge, she has also introduced programmed drum machine to her instrumentation choice. She continues to use drum machines in Through the Gash. Reviewers of her work have compared her to Tori Amos, Kate Bush and Lisa Germano.

== Songwriting ==
Long before Wicked was transformed into the same-titled Broadway musical, Fury composed and sang seven songs based on the original novel. Five of them appear on her first full-length CD album The Thing That Feels, a thirteen-song compilation released in 2000 — the other two are included on the 2003 six-song single I Can't Let You In. Fury has said that she was particularly obsessed with the book's character of Elphaba.

Fury's lyrics have also included references to such eclectic subject matter and imagery as the Marvel Comics character Man-Thing, matricide, mandrakes, caged birds, drowning and, most particularly, Marie Antoinette, who was mentioned in "The Necklace of Marie Antoinette" from Soul Poison, in "Carnival Justice (The Gloves Are Off) Part II" from Subterfuge, and in "Beware the Touch" from Through the Gash. In addition an illustration of Marie Antoinette has consistently appeared in merchandise sold in promotion of Fury's music. The connection to the French queen is further emphasized by the singer's website, which draws heavily on the aesthetics of the Rococo era, associated with Marie Antoinette and her Palace of Versailles.

Fury has worked with artist Scott Radke, whose puppets appear on the cover of Fury's EP Subterfuge and are also featured in her video for the song "Carnival Justice (The Gloves Are Off) Part II" from the same CD.

In 2020, thirteen years after her last musical release, Fury released her third album "Little Family" exclusively to Bandcamp.

As well as writing, performing and producing her music, Fury also designs jewelry for her boutique collection.

== Personal life ==
Fury married on September 21, 2017. She lost her husband to cancer in 2020. Fury stated that many of the songs on "Little Family" were inspired by his battle against the disease, as well as the death of her father, who had died a "long time" prior.

Fury and her husband were involved in a near-fatal traffic collision in 2015.

== Discography ==
- Soul Poison (1998)
- The Thing That Feels (2000)
- Meathook (2001)
- I Can't Let You In (2003)
- Subterfuge (2006)
- Through the Gash (2007)
- Not Sad (2015)
- Little Family (2020)
- The World We Want (2020)
- Spidersong (2020)
- Time (2020)
- It's Midnight (2020)
- September Day (2020)
- The Oracle Said (2020)
- Vibing (2020)
- Hello Earthling (2020)
- Fix (2021)
- Ride (2021)
- Last Winter (2021)
- Wild Enough (AKA Sing) (2021)
- Comics (2021)
- Stitch the Worlds (2021)
- Downsizing (2021)
- Greatest Show On Earth (2022)
