= The Predator Becomes the Prey =

Studio album by Ice Nine Kills
- Released: January 21, 2014
- Genre: Metalcore; post-hardcore
- Length: 37:33
- Label: Outerloop Management, Fearless
- Producer: Steve Sopchak

Ice Nine Kills chronology
The Predator (2013)	The Predator Becomes the Prey (2014)	Every Trick in the Book (2015)

Singles from The Predator Becomes the Prey
- 1. "What I Never Learned In Study Hall" Released: November 22, 2012; 2. "Connect the Cuts" Released: November 11, 2013; 3. "The Power in Belief" Released: January 8, 2014; 4. "Let's Bury the Hatchet... In Your Head" Released: February 27, 2014; 5. "The Fastest Way to a Girl's Heart Is Through Her Ribcage" Released: February 6, 2015

The Predator Becomes the Prey is the third studio album and the follow-up to the self-released The Predator EP by American heavy metal band Ice Nine Kills. This is their first and only album released after signing with Outerloop Records; a Fearless Records and Outerloop Management collaborative effort, formed November 8, 2013, Ice Nine Kills being their first signing.

The album was produced by Steve Sopchak at The Square Studio in Syracuse NY. It features guest vocals from Tyler Carter of Issues on the continuing saga "What I Never Learned In Study Hall".

The tracks "The Coffin Is Moving" and "What I Never Learned in Study Hall" are incorporated songs of the band's 2013 EP The Predator. The song "The Product of Hate" was a stand-alone single of the band released in 2013, the song was released in order to help because of the Boston Marathon bombing.

It's the first album featuring Justin Morrow as bass guitarist, after the departure of Steve Koch.

The album marks the band's first entrance onto the Billboard 200 debuting at No. 153 overall, No. 3 on the Heatseekers chart, No. 13 on the Hard Rock chart.

== Track listing ==
No.	Title	Length
1.	"The Power in Belief"	3:39
2.	"Let's Bury the Hatchet...In Your Head"	3:51
3.	"The Coffin Is Moving"	3:09
4.	"The Fastest Way to a Girl's Heart Is Through Her Ribcage"	3:07
5.	"The Product of Hate"	3:25
6.	"Connect the Cuts"	3:11
7.	"Jonathan"	2:53
8.	"What I Never Learned in Study Hall" (featuring Tyler Carter)	3:35
9.	"So Long Steven Long"	3:28
10.	"What Lies Beneath"	3:29
11.	"My Life in Two"	3:46
Total length:		37:33

== Personnel ==
Ice Nine Kills

- Spencer Charnas – lead vocals, art concept
- Justin "JD" DeBlieck – lead guitar, co-lead vocals, keyboards, programming, synthesizers, producer
- Justin Morrow – bass, rhythm guitar
- Conor Sullivan – drums
- Steve Koch – bass, clean vocals on "The Coffin is Moving" and "What I Never Learned in Study Hall"

Production

- Steve Sopchak – production, mixing, engineering
- Jason "Jocko" Randall – mastering
- Derek Brewer and Adam Mott – A&R
- Shane Bisnett – arrangement
- Benjamin Lande – artwork
- Eric Levin – band photo
- Taylor Rambo – photography

== Chart performance ==
Chart (2014)	Peak position
US Billboard 200	153
US Heatseekers Albums (Billboard)	3
US Top Hard Rock Albums (Billboard)	13
US Independent Albums (Billboard)	38
US Top Rock Albums (Billboard)	11
