= Smallcreep's Day (album) =

Studio album by Mike Rutherford
- Released: 15 February 1980
- Recorded: 1979
- Studio: Polar Studios (Stockholm)
- Genre: Progressive rock; pop rock
- Length: 51:28
- Label: Charisma
- Producer: David Hentschel

Mike Rutherford chronology
Smallcreep's Day (1980)	Acting Very Strange (1982)

Singles from Smallcreep's Day
- 1. "Working in Line"/"Compression"" Released: February 1980; 2. "Time and Time Again"/"At the End of the Day"" Released: July 1980

Smallcreep's Day is the first studio album by English guitarist and songwriter Mike Rutherford, released in February 1980 on Charisma Records. It was recorded in 1979 during a period of inactivity from his rock band Genesis, during which Rutherford and keyboardist Tony Banks recorded their first solo albums. The 24-minute title track is based on the 1965 novel Smallcreep's Day by Peter Currell Brown which tells the story of Mr. Smallcreep and the journey of self-discovery he takes through the assembly line of the factory he has worked in for forty years.

== Background and recording ==
In December 1978, rock band Genesis began a period of inactivity following their 1978 world tour and singer and drummer Phil Collins's decision to try to save his failing marriage. With time to spare, Rutherford and keyboardist Tony Banks began work on their debut solo albums. Though Rutherford remembered that making an album was not a great priority at the time, he thought the project would nevertheless be fun. He began to prepare material in early 1979, and used a growing number of short musical ideas, of two or three minutes in length, which he had begun developing several years earlier but which remained unused. Around one month into the process, however, he found that developing the small sections of the songs that were taking shape made them weaker overall. Rutherford saw the problem as an opportunity to use them as part of one long track that occupied an entire side of the vinyl. Such a format granted him the freedom of letting a section run without the pressure of having to develop or structure it a great deal. Once this was decided, he sought a concept for inspiration on the lyrics to tie the songs together.

Among the new experiences Rutherford faced in making Smallcreep's Day was picking a group of musicians to perform the music and explaining the different parts to them which he said was "an unbelievable amount of work". He did not know many potential candidates, and invited drummer Simon Phillips to play based on his reputation and his capability of handling the "very fast and furious" parts, yet unsure of his approach for simple beats. In a rehearsal session, Rutherford recalled that the drummer demonstrated he could handle all the material after the first few bars had been played. Despite planning a rehearsal period of three weeks, Rutherford said it was cut short to three days as Phillips had learnt the parts quickly. Rutherford also enlisted his longtime friend and original Genesis guitarist Anthony Phillips on keyboards, who had taken further music and piano lessons since his departure from the band in 1970. Rutherford felt he was an obvious choice as his style complemented his songwriting. With the addition of Morris Pert on percussion, the backing tracks were put down prior to the lead vocals. Rutherford deemed his voice unsuitable for singing, and sought a vocalist. The original plan was to have Chris Thompson from Manfred Mann's Earth Band do the vocals, but Rutherford thought his voice was too well known and the singer was unavailable due to other commitments. Rutherford then acquired Noel McCalla of Sniff 'n' the Tears who was once considered as the replacement for Genesis singer and frontman Peter Gabriel after he left the group in 1975.

Rutherford played all lead and bass guitars on the album which included an acoustic 6-string Ovation, an electric 12-string Alvarez, his custom made Shergold double neck bass, a Fender Stratocaster for lead parts, an Ibanez, and a Roland guitar synthesiser, from which he acquired a string sound that reminded him of a Polymoog synthesiser. The final track on the album, "At The End of the Day", was written on the Roland guitar synthesiser. He borrowed a few models from a keyboard roadie who was an avid guitar collector.

Later in 1979, with the material written and finalised, Rutherford travelled to Polar Studios in Stockholm, Sweden to record Smallcreep's Day with David Hentschel as producer and engineer with David Bascombe assisting. Rutherford and Phillips arrived at the studio first to put down the drum and rhythm tracks. He named former bandmate Steve Hackett and Genesis's live guitarist Daryl Stuermer as influences on the choice of guitar electronics and effects and acquiring a natural sound, respectively. Rutherford found the album unexpectedly difficult to make as he had never before realised the extent to which he relied on his Genesis bandmates to help make decisions and handle certain aspects of the music, including "whether the drums or the keyboard sounded right" which he never had to worry about before. However, he deemed it a good learning experience as it forced him to learn more about recording vocals, drums, and keyboards than he had known before. After recording, the album was mixed at Maison Rouge Studios in Fulham, London.

== Music ==
Smallcreep's Day opens with the 24-minute title track that has seven distinct movements. It is based on the 1965 novel Smallcreep's Day, the only book written by Peter Currell Brown. A satire on modern industrial life, the story follows Pinquean Smallcreep who has worked in the same factory for forty years and embarks on a journey of self-discovery as he follows its assembly line to find out what the factory produces. Brown had in fact worked in a factory for forty years himself. Rutherford had read the book roughly three years prior to starting work on the album, noting it had similarities to the Gormenghast series of fantasy novels by Mervyn Peake. Though he considered it "hardly a great piece of literature", he was more impressed with its spirit and the atmosphere it presented as a reader. He also chose the book as its story and setting were something he could work and develop from and adapted it to have a happy ending. He later noted a strong contrast in themes between the factory and machine-oriented imagery on his album and the more romantic and fantasy-inspired Genesis songs typical of the time. Rutherford had attempted to pass lines from the book as lyrics, but abandoned the idea as they failed to work effectively.

One other track recorded during the sessions for the album, "Compression", was released as the B-side to the single release of "Working in Line".

== Artwork ==
The sleeve was designed and illustrated by Storm Thorgerson and Aubrey Powell of Hipgnosis, who up until that point produced the covers for the Genesis albums The Lamb Lies Down on Broadway, A Trick of the Tail, Wind & Wuthering, and ...And Then There Were Three.... Rutherford deemed Hipgnosis a "natural choice" to design the artwork for Smallcreep's Day. After he had picked an image that he wanted on the front cover, Thorgerson's idea involved spraying it with developing ink so the image only came through in patches. Six different versions were produced, and Rutherford chose the design that he liked the most.

== Release ==
Smallcreep's Day was released in the UK on 15 February 1980 by Charisma Records. Its release in the US was handled by Passport Records. The album peaked at No. 13 on the UK Albums Chart and No. 163 on the US Billboard 200.

Rutherford put out two singles from the album. The first, "Working in Line" with the non-album track "Compression" on the B-side, was released in February 1980. A second consisting of "Time and Time Again" and "At the End of the Day" was released in July.

== Reception ==
Professional ratings
Review scores
Source	Rating
Allmusic	2.5/5 stars
Record Mirror	4/5 stars

Rutherford did not expect the album to be a great success following the commercial and critical disappointment of Banks' album. In a strategic move, Charisma placed Genesis stickers on the front cover which they had not done with Banks. Rutherford expressed his disagreement with the idea at first but he had changed his mind several weeks upon release. Former Genesis guitarist Steve Hackett telephoned Rutherford and told him Smallcreeps's Day sounded like a great album and was liked by Genesis' live drummer Chester Thompson also. Around the time of its release, Rutherford expressed an interest in making another solo album having already gone through the process and said he had gained a lot of self-confidence in his work as a result. In his 2014 biography, Rutherford summarised that Smallcreep's Day is "quite strong instrumentally, but its real value was as a breath of creative fresh air".

In a review printed in the August 1980 edition of International Musician & Recording World which featured a cover article on Genesis, reviewer Wolfram Eike summarised the album as "a quiet, melodic piece of work with bombastic synthesizer effects" which did not offer "anything new" due to Rutherford's association with Genesis music. He nonetheless wrote the album "turned out well – something for quiet listening". Paul Du Noyer wrote a critical review of the album in New Musical Express in the month of the album's release. Titled "New Genesis solo no revelation", Du Noyer claimed it was "probably the biggest heap of pretension-riddle piffle I've had to plough through in ages", criticising its display of overblown musical themes and lyrics. He did mention McCalla's "calm vocals", the melodic keyboard lines from Phillips, the precise drumming and percussion from Simon Phillips and Pert, and the "perfectly executed" guitars from Rutherford. Melody Maker reporter Chris Welch was more positive, calling it "one of the first rock albums of musical merit of the year". Steve McMullen, a record store owner and contributor to Allmusic, thoroughly panned the album in a retrospective review in which he rates the album two-and-a-half stars out of five. He wrote that Rutherford was incapable of writing "even one memorable song". He also claimed that Hentschel's production work had marred the Genesis albums Duke and ...And Then There Were Three..., and that it had similarly flawed Smallcreep's Day.

In a retrospective review of Brown's novel, Lawrence Person comments of the album that "The music is good but [Rutherford] gave the story a happy ending, rendering it a rather aggressive exercise in point-missing."

== Track listing ==
All tracks were written by Mike Rutherford. The below listing is taken from the original UK pressing. The two sides were swapped on the US pressing.

Side one
No.	Title	Length
1.	"Smallcreep's Day": I. "Between the Tick & the Tock"; II. "Working in Line"; III. "After Hours"; IV. "Cats and Rats (In This Neighbourhood)"; V. "Smallcreep Alone"; VI. "Out into the Daylight"; VII. "At the End of the Day"	24:41

Side two
No.	Title	Length
1.	"Moonshine"	6:26
2.	"Time and Time Again"	4:54
3.	"Romani"	5:27
4.	"Every Road"	4:15
5.	"Overnight Job"	5:44

== Personnel ==
Credits are adapted from the album's 1980 pressing.

Musicians

- Mike Rutherford – keyboards, guitars, bass guitar; ARP Avatar & Roland GR-500 guitar synthesizers
- Anthony Phillips – keyboards
- Simon Phillips – drums
- Morris Pert – percussion
- Noel McCalla – vocals

Production

- David Hentschel – producer, engineer
- David Bascombe – assistant engineer
- Andy Mackrill – equipment
- Dale Newman – equipment
- Geoff Banks – equipment
- Hipgnosis – cover design, photography
- Tony Smith – management at Hit & Run

== Charts ==
Chart (1980)	Peak position
Norwegian Albums (VG-lista)	30
UK Albums (OCC)	13
US Billboard 200	163

Chart (2022)	Peak position
Scottish Albums (OCC)	61
UK Rock & Metal Albums (OCC)	13
