= Smallcreep's Day =

1965 surreal novel by Peter Currell Brown

First p/b edition (publ. Panther Books)

Smallcreep's Day is Peter Currell Brown's only novel and was first published by Victor Gollancz Ltd in 1965. The story is a surreal satire on modern industrial life. The novel was written while the author worked at R A Lister and Company in Dursley, Gloucestershire.

The central character Pinquean Smallcreep works in the slotting section of a vast and labyrinthine factory and has done so for years. He becomes curious about the purpose of the pulley that he puts the slots in and one day, having become obsessed by an idea, leaves his machine and goes exploring through the strange world of his factory. On a quest to find meaning in his monotonous existence, Smallcreep experiences many surreal and disturbing situations. Each scene explores some of the author's ideas about human relationships, freedom and the value of human life. Some of the scenes are hilarious, some depressing and some macabre.

The book went out of print in the 1970s, but was re-issued by Pinter & Martin in September 2008. In the February 2009 issue of The Magazine of Fantasy and Science Fiction, science fiction writer and critic Lawrence Person calls it "a bitter, didactic, bracing novel."

Smallcreep's Day was the inspiration for the album of the same name by Genesis guitarist Mike Rutherford, released in 1980.
