= The Silver Scream =

2018 album by Ice Nine Kills

Studio album by Ice Nine Kills
- Released: October 5, 2018
- Recorded: 2017–2018
- Genre: Metalcore; heavy metal; post-hardcore
- Length: 49:43
- Label: Fearless
- Producer: Drew Fulk

Ice Nine Kills chronology
Every Trick in the Book (2015)	The Silver Scream (2018)	The Silver Scream 2: Welcome to Horrorwood (2021)

Singles from The Silver Scream
- 1. "Enjoy Your Slay" Released: May 26, 2017; 2. "The American Nightmare" Released: June 20, 2018; 3. "Thank God It's Friday" Released: July 13, 2018; 4. "A Grave Mistake" Released: September 14, 2018; 5. "Stabbing in the Dark" Released: October 19, 2018; 6. "Merry Axe-mas" Released: December 21, 2018; 7. "Savages" Released: July 28, 2019; 8. "IT Is the End" Released: September 24, 2019

The Silver Scream is the fifth studio album by the American heavy metal band Ice Nine Kills, released on October 5, 2018, by Fearless Records. Much like their previous album where all tracks were inspired by different novels, all the tracks are inspired by horror films. Some examples of the source material are A Nightmare on Elm Street ("The American Nightmare"), Friday the 13th ("Thank God It's Friday"), and The Texas Chain Saw Massacre ("Savages"). The album features guest appearances by the band's former singer Jeremy Schwartz, Tony Lovato of Mest, actress Chelsea Talmadge, Randy Strohmeyer of Finch, Buddy Schaub and Peter "JR" Wasilewski of Less Than Jake, Will Salazar of Fenix TX, and Stanley Kubrick's grandson Sam Kubrick of the UK band Shields. The album marked their highest chart positions in the US, debuting at number 29 on the Billboard 200 and number two on the Hard Rock Albums chart. "A Grave Mistake" became the band's first top ten hit on the Billboard Mainstream Rock charts. This is the final album to feature guitarist and vocalist Justin DeBlieck, as well as bassist Justin Morrow, who departed from the band in March 2019 to join Motionless in White.

Five music videos have been released in which lead singer Spencer Charnas visits a psychologist after experiencing dreams based on the songs ("The American Nightmare", "Thank God It's Friday", "A Grave Mistake", "Stabbing in the Dark", "IT Is the End"). A sixth video was also released, though this one takes place in Christmas of 1993, when Charnas was a child and celebrating Christmas Day with his parents ("Merry Axe-Mas").

A deluxe reissue edition titled The Silver Scream: Final Cut was released on October 25, 2019. The reissue contains bonus tracks including the band’s cover of Michael Jackson's hit song, "Thriller", a song about the Scream horror film series, one live track, and three acoustic tracks.

== Reception ==
Professional ratings
Review scores
Source	Rating
AllMusic	4/5 stars
New Noise	5/5 stars
Soundfiction	8.6/10
Wall of Sound	9.5/10

Wall of Sound gave the album a 9.5/10 and said "The Silver Scream is more than just music, it is an event."

Caleb Newton of New Noise Magazine wrote in a positive review that the album "is an exhilarating exploration of just what metal can be... There's room for bombastic and experimental pressing forward, and at that, such is welcome, and perhaps even needed in the modern music community."

== Track listing ==
No.	Title	Cinematic inspiration	Length
1.	"The American Nightmare"	A Nightmare on Elm Street	4:10
2.	"Thank God It's Friday"	Friday the 13th	4:23
3.	"Stabbing in the Dark"	Halloween	4:36
4.	"Savages"	The Texas Chain Saw Massacre	2:57
5.	"The Jig Is Up" (featuring Randy Strohmeyer of Finch)	Saw	3:57
6.	"A Grave Mistake"	The Crow	3:04
7.	"Rocking the Boat" (featuring Jeremy Schwartz)	Jaws	4:06
8.	"Enjoy Your Slay" (featuring Sam Kubrick of Shields (UK))	The Shining	4:16
9.	"Freak Flag"	The Devil's Rejects	3:18
10.	"The World in My Hands" (featuring Tony Lovato of Mest)	Edward Scissorhands	3:50
11.	"Merry Axe-mas"	Silent Night, Deadly Night	3:18
12.	"Love Bites" (featuring Chelsea Talmadge)	An American Werewolf in London	3:00
13.	"It Is the End" (featuring Peter "JR" Wasilewski and Buddy Schaub of Less Than Jake and Will Salazar of Fenix TX)	It	4:48
Total length:			49:43

"Final Cut" Bonus Tracks
No.	Title	Cinematic inspiration	Length
14.	"Your Number's Up" (featuring Sarah J. Bartholomew)	Scream franchise	2:59
15.	"Thriller" (Michael Jackson cover)	Michael Jackson's Thriller	3:10
16.	"A Grave Mistake" (Acoustic Live From SiriusXM)	The Crow	3:07
17.	"Stabbing in the Dark" (Acoustic featuring Matt Heafy)	Halloween	3:45
18.	"Savages" (Acoustic)	The Texas Chain Saw Massacre	3:11
19.	"Thank God It's Friday" (Acoustic featuring Ari Lehman)	Friday the 13th	3:47
Total length:			69:43

Notes

- "Savages" is stylized in all caps.
- "It Is the End" is stylized as "IT is The End".

== Personnel ==
- Spencer Charnas – clean vocals, screamed vocals, voice overs, piano, guitar
- Justin DeBlieck – guitars, screamed vocals, orchestration, keyboard, programming, piano, engineering, mixing
- Justin Morrow – bass
- Patrick Galante – drums (tracks 14–15)
- Joseph Occhiuti – bass (tracks 14–15)
- Dan Sugarman – lead guitar (tracks 14–15)
- Ricky Armellino – rhythm guitar (track 14–15)
- Drew Fulk – production, mixing, mastering
- Jeff Dunne – engineering, mixing, mastering
- Mike Cortada – album artwork

=== Writing credits ===
- Spencer Charnas – music and lyrics
- Justin DeBlieck – music
- Steve Sopchak – lyrics
- Drew Fulk – additional music and lyrics ("The American Nightmare", "Stabbing in the Dark", "Savages", "The Jig Is Up")
- Josh Strock – additional music ("The American Nightmare", "Savages")
- Jeremy Schwartz – additional music and lyrics ("Rocking the Boat", "The World in My Hands")
- Will Salazar – additional music and lyrics ("It Is the End")
- Randy Strohmeyer – additional music ("The Jig Is Up")
- Joseph Occhiuti – additional piano arrangements ("Thank God It's Friday", "Your Number's Up", "Thank God It's Friday" (Acoustic), "Savages" (Acoustic))
- Ricky Armellino – additional music and lyrics ("The American Nightmare", "Merry Axe-Mas", "Your Number's Up")
- Dan Sugarman – additional music and vocals ("Your Number's Up", "Thriller", "Savages" (Acoustic), "Thank God It's Friday" (Acoustic), "A Grave Mistake" (Acoustic))

== Charts ==
Chart performance for The Silver Scream
Chart (2018)	Peak position
UK Album Downloads (OCC)	64
UK Rock & Metal Albums (OCC)	14
US Billboard 200	29
US Top Hard Rock Albums (Billboard)	2
US Top Rock Albums (Billboard)	4
