= Every Trick in the Book =

Studio album by Ice Nine Kills
- Released: December 4, 2015
- Genre: Metalcore; symphonic metal
- Length: 37:37
- Label: Fearless
- Producer: Steve Sopchak

Ice Nine Kills chronology
| The Predator Becomes the Prey (2014) | Every Trick in the Book (2015) | The Silver Scream (2018) |

Singles from Every Trick in the Book
- 1. "Me, Myself & Hyde" Released: February 19, 2015; 2. "Bloodbath & Beyond" Released: September 25, 2015; 3. "Communion of the Cursed" Released: October 22, 2015; 4. "Hell in the Hallways" Released: May 20, 2016; 5. "The Nature of the Beast" Released: March 29, 2017

Every Trick in the Book is the fourth album by the American heavy metal band Ice Nine Kills, released on December 4, 2015, by Fearless Records. It is the band's first release through Fearless Records and their fourth overall. Each track on the album is based on a piece of literature. Some examples of the source material are: Strange Case of Dr Jekyll and Mr Hyde ("Me, Myself & Hyde"), Dracula ("Bloodbath & Beyond"), The Exorcist ("Communion of the Cursed"), and Romeo & Juliet ("Star-Crossed Enemies"). The album peaked at number 122 on the US Billboard 200, selling over 7,300 albums in its first week. This is the last album the band released to feature Conor Sullivan on drums.

== Background ==
Spencer Charnas explained that he and the band created a "master list" of "30 to 40 books" they felt would make for compelling songs, forgoing a ton of Stephen King novels to avoid "double up authors" and Kurt Vonnegut's works for being too complex to "do it justice in a three-minute song."

== Promotion ==
In September 2015, the band were announced as headliners for Fearless' Fresh Faces Tour alongside Wage War and the White Noise, beginning on October 24 at Rochester's Water Street Music Hall and finishing on November 22 at the Upstate Concert Hall in Clifton Park. On October 20, 2016, they announced a 14-city European tour, starting on November 3 at Manchester's Satans Hollow club and ending on November 17 at Wiesbaden's Kulturzentrum Schlachthof venue. Affiance and Shields were supporting acts during the tour. On August 16, 2017, the band announced a nine-city fall US tour, beginning on September 28 at Anaheim's Chain Reaction venue and finishing on October 8 at The Foundry in Lakewood, Ohio. Capsize, Lorna Shore and Phantoms were supporting acts during the tour.

== Critical reception ==
Professional ratings
Review scores
| Source | Rating |
|---|---|
| Distorted Sound | 5/10 |
| The Music | 4/5 stars |

Alex Sievers of The Music praised the band's use of classic literature for the album's overall theme but was critical of the ballads disrupting the flow and steering away from the "deadly riffs and breakdowns" and "dark lyrical ravings", concluding that "this band won't revolutionise the heavy music world, and the record itself isn't quite a perfect album, but their brand of post-hardcore/metalcore is done much better than most of their peers right now and INK could very well be on the cusp of some very big success." Sam Dignon of Distorted Sound also praised the overall concept throughout the record but felt it didn't distinguish itself from other similar acts who use "standard chugging metalcore riffs and breakdowns", found inconsistent lyricism throughout the track listing, and criticized the cheesy and clichéd ballads of "Star-Crossed Enemies" and "Tess-Timony" for being the "worst moments" on the album, concluding that: "Without the concept the songs just don't hold up by themselves, if the songs themselves were just more interesting then perhaps this could have been an enjoyable album."

== Track listing ==
| No. | Title | Literary inspiration | Length |
|---|---|---|---|
| 1. | "The Nature of the Beast" | Animal Farm by George Orwell | 3:38 |
| 2. | "Communion of the Cursed" | The Exorcist by William Peter Blatty | 4:30 |
| 3. | "Bloodbath & Beyond" | Dracula by Bram Stoker | 3:39 |
| 4. | "The Plot Sickens" | Alive: The Story of the Andes Survivors by Piers Paul Read | 3:40 |
| 5. | "Star-Crossed Enemies" | Romeo and Juliet by William Shakespeare | 3:45 |
| 6. | "Me, Myself & Hyde" | The Strange Case of Dr. Jekyll and Mr. Hyde by Robert Louis Stevenson | 4:04 |
| 7. | "Alice" | Go Ask Alice by Beatrice Sparks | 3:11 |
| 8. | "The People in the Attic" | The Diary of a Young Girl by Anne Frank | 3:48 |
| 9. | "Tess-Timony" | Tess of the d'Urbervilles by Thomas Hardy | 3:14 |
| 10. | "Hell in the Hallways" | Carrie by Stephen King | 4:08 |
| Total length: | | | 37:37 |

== Personnel ==
Credits retrieved from Credits section of Spotify and Genius

Ice Nine Kills

- Spencer Charnas - lead vocals
- Justin "JD" DeBlieck - lead guitar, co-lead vocals, keyboards, programming, synthesizers
- Justin Morrow - bass, rhythm guitar
- Connor Sullivan - drums, percussion

Production

- Steve Sopchak - production, lyrics, additional engineering
- Brad Blackwood - mastering engineer
- Dan Korneff - mixing engineer
- Johnny Andrews - lyrics, arrangement
- Francesco Ferrini - arrangement
- Lisa DeBlieck - arrangement
- Taylor Larson - arrangement
- Joe Occhiuti - additional engineering (track 10)
- Adam George - additional engineering
- Nick Sferlazza - additional engineering
- Ruby Rabetoy - voice-over (track 2)
- Saul Torres & Chris Foitle - A&R

== Chart performance ==
| Chart (2015) | Peak position |
|---|---|
| US Billboard 200 | 122 |
| US Heatseekers Albums (Billboard) | 1 |
| US Top Hard Rock Albums (Billboard) | 3 |
| US Independent Albums (Billboard) | 4 |
