= Ice Nine Kills =

American heavy metal band

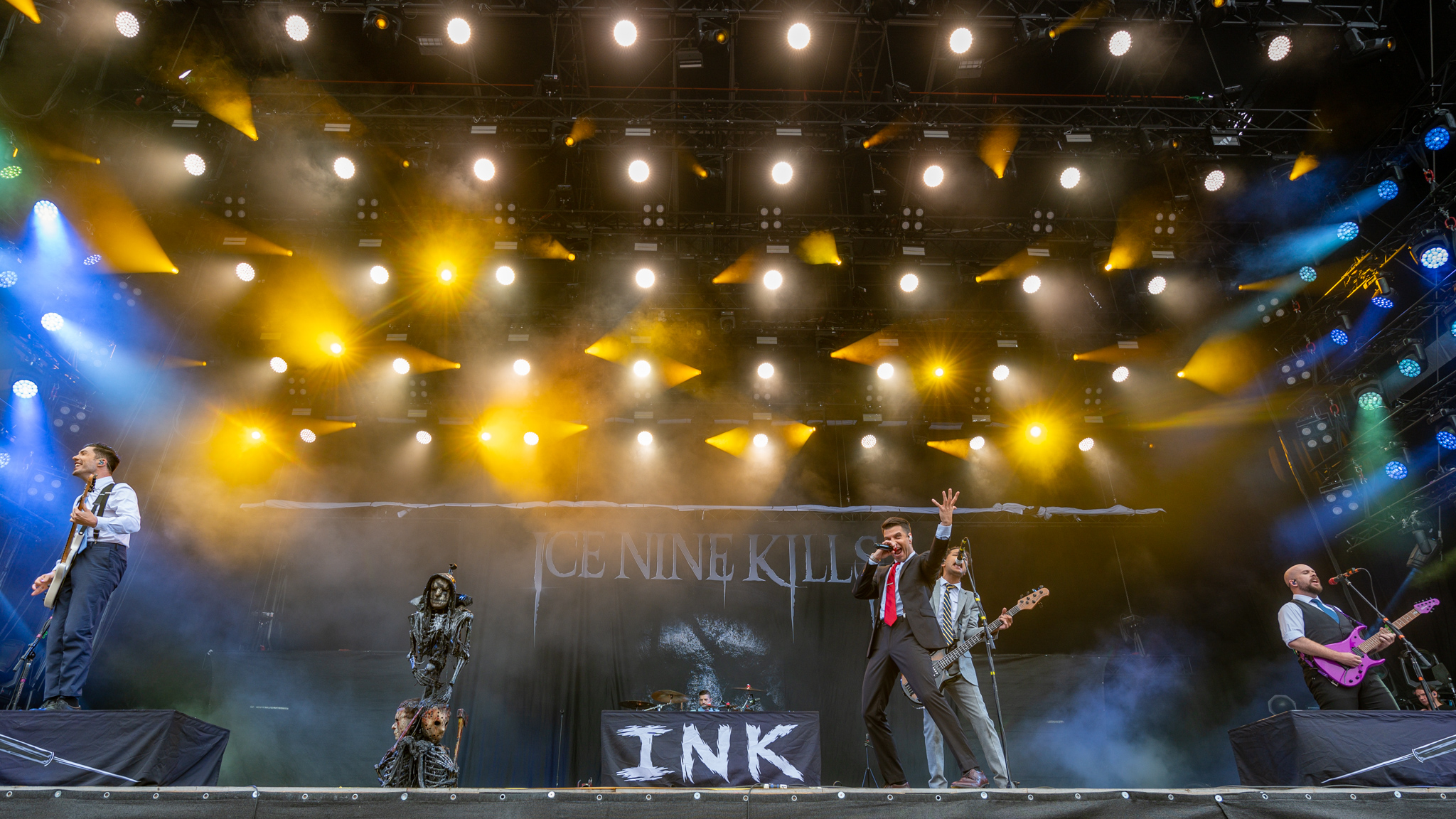
- Ice Nine Kills performing at Rock im Park 2022

Background information
- Also known as: Ice Nine (2000–2006); Grave Diggler
- Origin: Boston, Massachusetts, U.S.
- Genres: Metalcore; melodic metalcore; post-hardcore; symphonic metal
- Works: Ice Nine Kills discography
- Years active: 2000–present
- Labels: Red Blue Records; Ferret; Outerloop; Fearless
- Members: Spencer Charnas; Ricky Armellino; Joe Occhiuti; Dan Sugarman; Miles Dimitri Baker; Mike Cortada
- Past members: Jeremy Schwartz; Andrew Justin Smith; Hobie Boeschenstein; Dave Marvuglio; Dave Sieling; Shane Bisnett; Steve Koch; Grant Newsted; Joseph Merturi; Conor Sullivan; Justin Morrow; Justin DeBlieck; Patrick Galante
- Website: iceninekills.com

Ice Nine Kills is an American heavy metal band from Boston, Massachusetts. The band's music is primarily described as horror-themed metalcore, but incorporates many other musical styles. It was originally a ska punk band called Ice Nine, formed in 2000 by high school friends Spencer Charnas and Jeremy Schwartz, before adopting a metalcore style in 2010. Charnas is currently the only remaining founding member. The band is signed to Fearless Records.

Ice Nine Kills has released three EPs along with six full-length studio albums: Last Chance to Make Amends, Safe Is Just a Shadow, The Predator Becomes the Prey, Every Trick in the Book, which peaked at number 122 on the US Billboard 200; The Silver Scream, which peaked at number 29; and their latest, The Silver Scream 2: Welcome to Horrorwood which peaked at number 18. Their band name is derived from the fictional substance ice-nine from the 1963 novel Cat's Cradle by Kurt Vonnegut.

In 2025, Jeff Mezydlo of Yardbarker included the band in his list of "the greatest metal acts that formed in the 2000s". In 2023, Jake Richardson of Loudwire included Spencer Charnas in his list of the "10 Best Clean Singers in Metalcore".

== History ==
=== 2000–2009: Formation and Last Chance to Make Amends ===
Ice Nine Kills was founded in 2000 under the name Ice Nine by high school friends Spencer Charnas and Jeremy Schwartz. They later recruited drummer Grant Newsted in 2003 and swapped out then-bassist Patrick Morse for Hobie Boeschenstein in 2004. In 2002, they recorded a demo, which would eventually be released in 2009 entitled The Pop-Punk-Ska Years. They changed their name to Ice Nine Kills just before releasing their debut independent album Last Chance to Make Amends on April 20, 2006.

The following year on November 20, 2007, Ice Nine Kills released their EP The Burning through Red Blue Records. The band then set out on several national tours in support of the EP, including opening slots on tours with I See Stars and Eyes Set to Kill among others. By 2008, the group had been invited to open for well-known acts such as As I Lay Dying, A Day to Remember, Thursday, Paramore and a one-off performance on the Taste of Chaos 2009 tour. That same year, Ice Nine Kills released two acoustic tracks ("The Simple Act of Giving Up" and "Lifetime in a Week") on an EP titled 2 Song Acoustic.

In mid-2009, Schwartz left the band after struggling with life on the road, leaving Charnas as the only original member. Charnas then recruited former members of the Rochester-based post-hardcore band Remember Tomorrow which had recently disbanded and stopped playing rhythm guitar. This shifted Ice Nine Kills' sound into more of an experimental metalcore sound to which Ferret Music took notice. The label signed the band in the spring of 2009 and, after their appearance on Warped Tour 2009, the band began writing and recording their next record.

=== 2010–2013: Safe Is Just a Shadow and The Predator ===
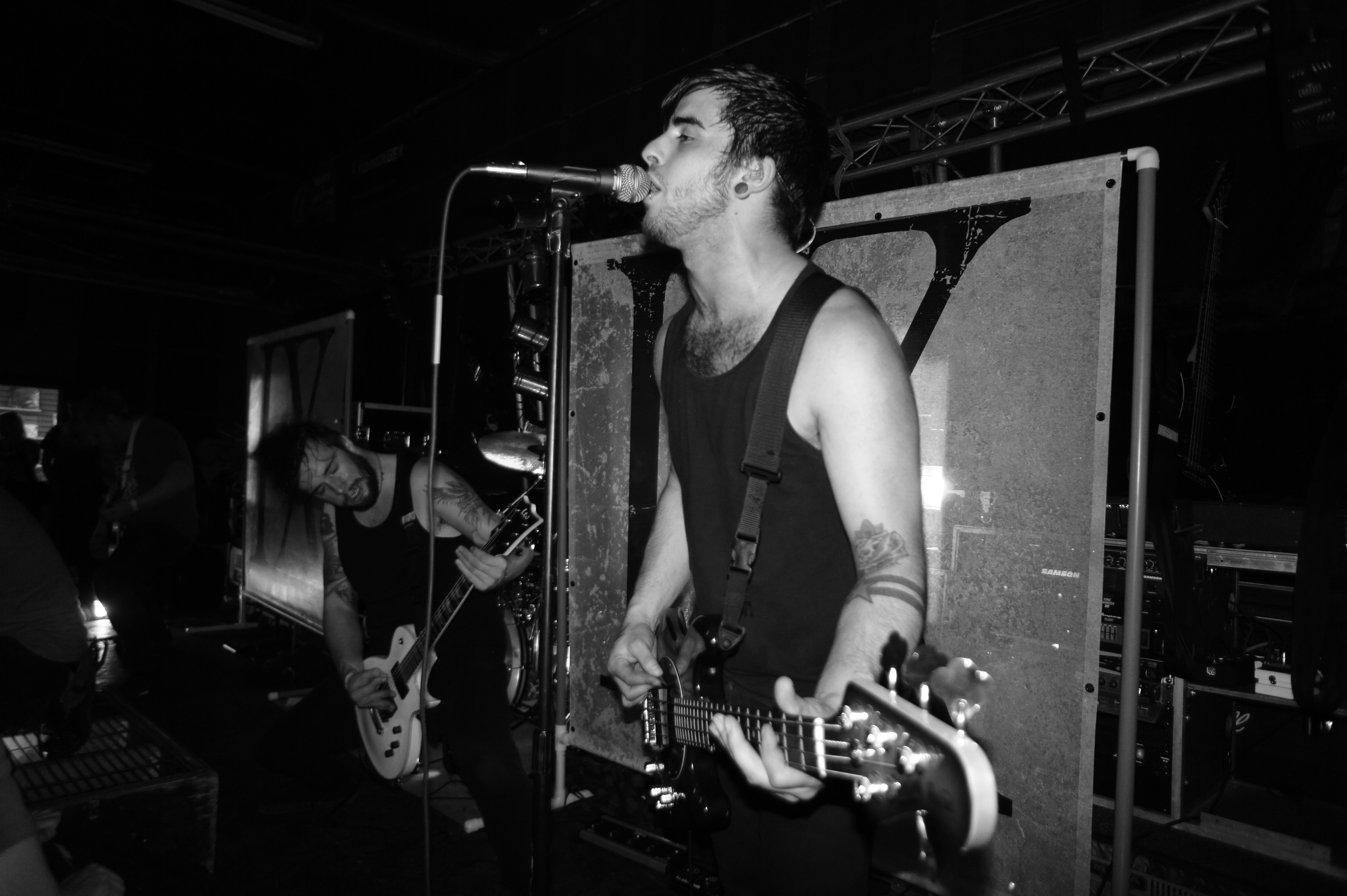
Former guitarist Justin Morrow (left) and deceased bassist Shane Bisnett (right) performing live in 2011

Ice Nine Kills released their second full-length album Safe Is Just a Shadow on July 12, 2010. Vocalist Dave Sieling, who has since left the band, contributed clean vocals along with Spencer Charnas. The album received praise from heavy metal magazine, Revolver in the 2010 Hottest Chicks in Rock Issue and subsequently the band was invited to attend the Revolver Golden Gods awards in Los Angeles CA on April 20, 2010. The band supported Safe Is Just a Shadow with a two-week appearance on Warped Tour 2010, and a supporting slot with Michigan-based nu metal band Taproot. The band performed on a headlining tour in the summer of 2011 as well as a performance at the Darien Lake NY stop of Warped Tour 2011 on the Dzambo Stage. The band released a music video inspired by the film Inglourious Basterds for their song "The People Under the Stairs".

On May 12, 2012, it was announced that the band would be the opening act for the 2012 edition of The All Stars Tour featuring Suicide Silence, The Word Alive, Dance Gavin Dance, I See Stars, and Attila. On November 22, 2012, they launched a Kickstarter campaign to raise money to fund their new EP. On December 22 the band announced that they had raised over $21,000 for their Kickstarter campaign and that their new EP The Predator would be released on January 15, 2013. To celebrate this announcement they released a second single from the EP entitled "What I Never Learned In Study Hall" featuring guest vocals from Tyler Carter vocalist of Issues. The acoustic version of the song was released on January 8 on the Take Action compilation volume 11 via Hopeless Records.

Logo for Ice Nine Kills

The band's second EP entitled The Predator was released on January 15, 2013, and debuted at No. 9 on the Billboard Heatseekers chart.

On April 26, 2013, the band released a stand-alone single called "The Product of Hate", the song was released as a fundraising way to help the victims of the Boston Marathon bombing.

On July 9, 2013, the band released the official video for the song "The Coffin Is Moving".

On November 4, 2013, the band released a new single titled, "Connect the Cuts".

=== 2014–2015: The Predator Becomes the Prey ===
On January 8, 2014, the band released the second single from their forthcoming album, "The Power in Belief". Ice Nine Kills released their third studio album The Predator Becomes the Prey on January 21 through the newly created Outerloop Records, an imprint of Fearless Records. The album marks the band's first entrance into the Billboard Top 200 charts landing at No. 153. The album also debuted at No. 3 on the top heatseeker's chart, No. 38 on the independent label chart, and No. 13 on the Hard Rock charts.

On February 26, 2014, it was revealed that Ice Nine Kills would be performing on the Monster Energy Stage for the entire Warped Tour 2014.

On February 27, 2014, Ice Nine Kills Released a music video for "Let's Bury the Hatchet... In Your Head". On February 6, 2015, Ice Nine Kills released a music video for "The Fastest Way to a Girl's Heart Is Through Her Ribcage". On February 19, 2015, Ice Nine Kills released a new song called "Me Myself & Hyde" from their new album scheduled for fall of 2015. From April 30 – May 22, Ice Nine Kills Headlined the IX Lives Tour with Get Scared, Upon This Dawning, Chasing Safety, and Brightwell. On June 22, 2015, Ice Nine Kills released a music video for their version of "Animals" by Maroon 5 on Fearless Records for Punk Goes Pop Vol. 6.

=== 2015–2018: Every Trick in the Book ===
On September 17, 2015, the band signed to Fearless Records. The band released their album Every Trick in the Book on December 4, 2015. The lead single and music video, "Bloodbath & Beyond" was released on September 25. The second single, "Communion of the Cursed", was released on October 22. The music video was a 'shortened remake' of The Exorcist.

Alongside other newly signed Fearless Records artist Wage War and The White Noise, the band headlined on the "Fresh Faces Tour" from October 24 – November 29, 2016.

Ice Nine Kills released a re-recorded version of their 2010 album Safe Is Just a Shadow on January 6, 2017. Vocalist Spencer Charnas described the reasoning, stating, "With the evolution of our skills as musicians, and the original producer, Steve Sopchak, having established himself at the top of his craft, we felt this was a perfect time to re-record the album and give it that extra attention that it always deserved."

In March 2017, they released a music video for "The Nature of the Beast" inspired by the book Animal Farm. Additionally, the band was featured on the Fearless Punk Goes Pop series Punk Goes Pop 7 covering "I Don't Wanna Live Forever" originally by Zayn and Taylor Swift on July 14, 2017. Afterwards, the band toured with Motionless in White and Chelsea Grin, while working on their upcoming studio album.

On June 14, 2018, drummer Conor Sullivan announced that he was leaving the band to pursue different musical projects. He was replaced by Affiance drummer Patrick Galante.

=== 2018–2023: The Silver Scream series ===
==== The Silver Scream ====
On June 20, 2018, Ice Nine Kills released "The American Nightmare", the first single from their fifth studio album The Silver Scream. It was accompanied by a music video inspired by the film A Nightmare on Elm Street (1984). The Silver Scream was released on October 5, 2018, and marked the band's highest chart debut to date. The album scanned almost 19,000 copies in its first week, landing the band their first top 10 records on the billboard top album chart. It features thirteen songs inspired by thirteen separate horror films.

In an interview with Wall of Sound on September 24, 2018, Spencer Charnas revealed that the band collaborated with Fenix TX member Will Salazar and two Less Than Jake members Peter "JR" Wasilewski and Buddy Schaub on the song "It Is the End" which is inspired by the 2017 film adaptation of Stephen King's 1986 epic supernatural horror novel It. Wasilewski and Schaub provided the brass instrument section of the song to give it a "sinister, carnival and circus vibe".

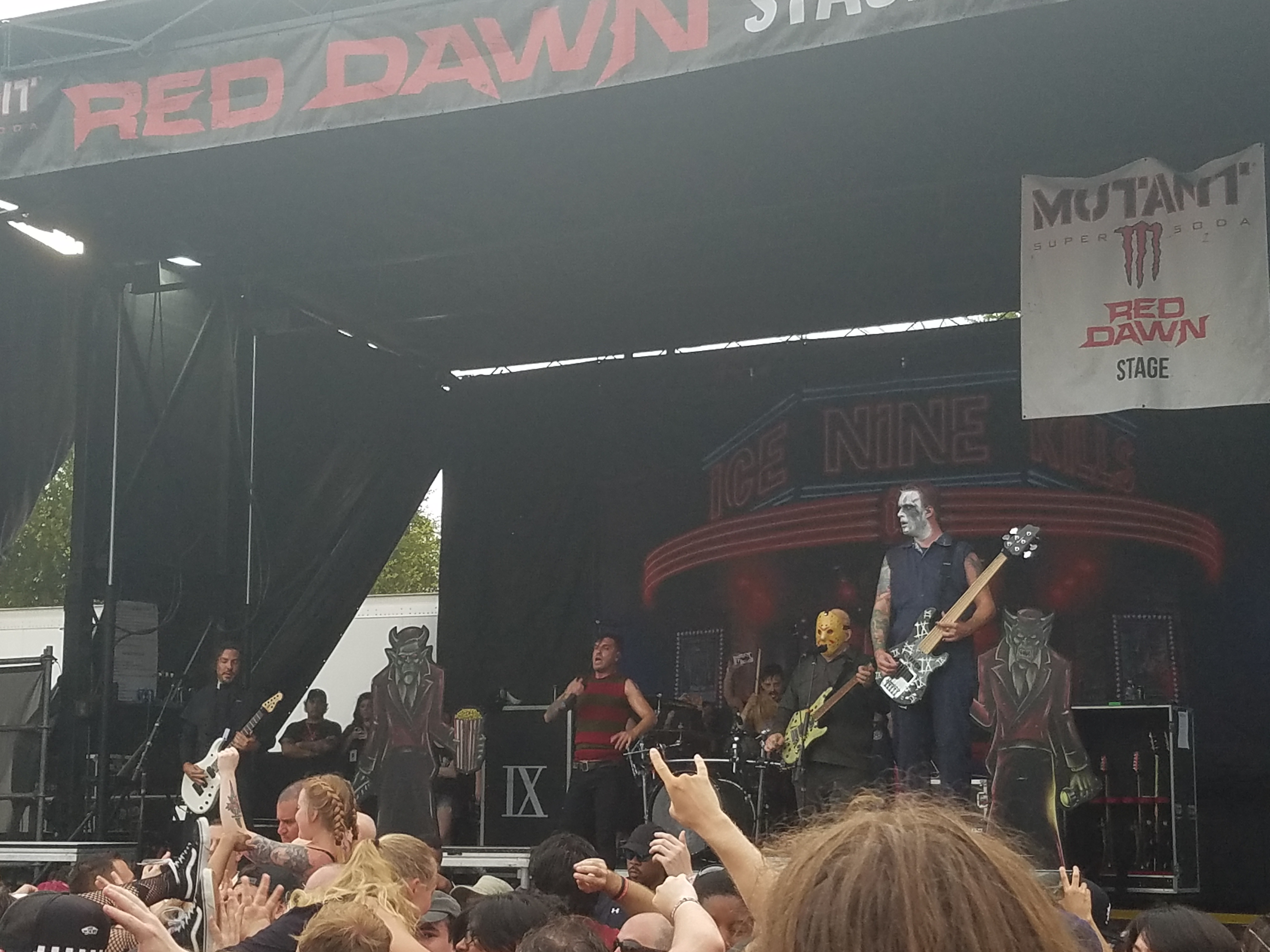
Ice Nine Kills performing in 2018

On January 1, 2019, former bassist Shane Bisnett died at age 31. Frontman Spencer Charnas revealed the news via Instagram sharing a video and anecdotal story about his former bandmate who recorded bass on the band's 2010 album Safe Is Just a Shadow. Lead guitarist Justin DeBlieck released a tribute song named "Sunrise" under the moniker Fallbrook.

On March 23, 2019, Justin Morrow left the band to join Motionless in White, with Joe Occhiuti being announced as his replacement. Justin DeBlieck was also not present on the first two tours of 2019 while he was producing the new Motionless in White album, Disguise.

On September 13, 2019, the band released an acoustic rendition of their hit song, "Savages". On September 24, the band released their final music video for the Silver Scream completing the storyline they had started with "The American Nightmare" with the release of a music video for the final track on the album, "It is the End".

On October 4, 2019, the band released the acoustic version for their song, "Stabbing in the Dark" featuring Matt Heafy of Trivium. The band's reissue of The Silver Scream, dubbed the "Final Cut", was released on October 25. The reissue featured the band covering Michael Jackson's hit song, "Thriller" and a song about the Scream horror series.

On May 9, 2020, the band recorded a parody version of "Stacy's Mom" by Fountains of Wayne entitled "Jason's Mom", inspired by Friday the 13th (1980), in celebration for the day of the film's 40th anniversary. The song was released a year later on May 7, 2021.

On June 24, 2020, the band posted on their socials a link to a maze game to "unlock the secret". The landing page of the link states they will be releasing Undead & Unplugged: Live From the Overlook Hotel on June 26, 2020.

On October 30, 2020, the band released I Heard They KILL Live!!, a live album recorded at the Worcester Palladium. The release also had an accompanying The Silver Stream livestream. The Silver Stream mixed live footage from the 19-track set with a self-produced horror movie framing device, featuring the band members and Bill Moseley. The horror movie aspect of The Silver Scream was helmed by Spencer Charnas and director Myles Erfurth of Stained Glass Eye Entertainment.

The band also announced Inked in Blood, a tie-in graphic novel to The Silver Scream planned for release on April 21, 2021. The graphic novel was written by Steve Foxe and illustrated by Giorga Sposito & Andres Esparza.

==== Welcome To Horrorwood: The Silver Scream 2 ====
The band released a cover and music video of the Elvis Presley song "Can't Help Falling in Love" on February 9, 2021, to the Fearless Records YouTube channel. The title of the new album was listed in the credits as The Silver Scream 2: Welcome to Horrorwood. On the ninth of each month leading up to the album's release, a new single and accompanying video was released to promote the album. On July 9, 2021, the band released the lead single from the album "Hip to Be Scared", inspired by American Psycho. The single features Papa Roach frontman Jacoby Shaddix, and was released along with an accompanying music video. On August 3, 2021, the band released a teaser video featuring the album's track listing, leading fans to predict and speculate the horror/thriller movies that inspired the songs on the album. On August 9, 2021, the band released the second single "Assault & Batteries", inspired by Child's Play. On September 9, 2021, the band released the third single "Rainy Day", inspired by Resident Evil. On October 9, 2021, the band released the fourth single "Funeral Derangements", inspired by Pet Semetary. The album was released on October 15, 2021. Four months after the album had released, the band released the fifth single from the record, "Take Your Pick" featuring George "Corpsegrinder" Fisher, taking cinematic inspiration from My Bloody Valentine and being released on February 14, 2022, for Valentine's Day alongside an animated music video.

On October 17, 2023, the band released a new song, "Meat & Greet", taken from the new release of Welcome to Horrorwood: Under Fire, taking cinematic inspiration from The Silence of The Lambs.

=== 2022–present: A Work of Art and official film collaborations ===
On March 31, 2022, the band released a new song, "Hunting Season", taken from The Fall Of Troi expansion of the video game, PUBG: New State.

In August 2022, the band hosted its first Silver Scream Con, a horror convention in Danvers, Massachusetts with celebrity guests and performances by the band.

In 2023, the band was featured on the Bayside single "How to Ruin Everything (Patience)" from their album The Blue EP. In July 2024, Ice Nine Kills collaborated with Reel Big Fish for a cover of "Walking on Sunshine", originally by Katrina and the Waves, in connection with a comic book adaptation of American Psycho.

In September 2024, during Silver Scream Con III, the band announced a forthcoming single, "A Work of Art", written as an official collaboration for Terrifier 3. It was also announced that "A Work of Art" would have a music video featuring Shavo Odadjian of System of a Down, to be released at the Terrifier 3 premiere. The song was released on October 10, 2024, with a 15-minute long music video released the following day, starring David Howard Thornton and Catherine Corcoran. On October 12, drummer Patrick Galante announced that he had parted ways with the band.

In April 2025, it was announced that Charnas had co-written a script with Paul Soter for a horror film entitled The Slashin' of the Christ. The film is set to be produced by Greg Nicotero, Brian Witten, and Chris Nilsson. The band's "Silver-Scream-A-Thon" tour, which occurred in spring of 2025, involved them playing two venues in each city they visited. Each night would feature a different album, either The Silver Scream or The Silver Scream 2: Welcome to Horrorwood.

On May 24, 2025, the band promoted a Memorial Day sale for Ice Nine Kills merchandise on Instagram. The post included an image which some fans and Metal Injection disapprovingly identified as AI-generated art, the latter referring to the imagery as "slop". The following day, the band issued a sarcastic response pledging to "get to the bottom of this horrific headline-making crime against Redditors", which also included another purportedly AI-generated promotional image. This prompted further criticism from fans and multiple metal magazines. In July 2025, it was announced that their next single would be entitled "The Great Unknown" and would be inspired by The Matrix, the first song by the band inspired by a non-horror film series.

In September 2025, WWE wrestler Rhea Ripley, a long-time fan of the band, made a guest appearance with Ice Nine Kills during their set at Silver Scream Con 4 in Worcester, Massachusetts. She appeared on stage during the performance of "A Work of Art," participating in a staged sequence with Art the Clown. Also during Silver Scream Con 4, it was announced that Matthew Lillard was working with Ice Nine Kills via his liquor company "Find Familiar Spirits" on a new bourbon for their "Macabre Spirits" line called "Horrorwood Reserve'. It was released on October 9, alongside a new single titled "The Laugh Track", based on the earlier, more dark and twisted portrayal of 'The Joker' character in the 'Batman' series. The accompanying music video was also Matthew Lillard's debut in the "INK cinematic universe".

In October 2025, Ice Nine Kills embarked on their "A Work of Art Tour 2025", ending with a headline show at OVO Arena Wembley on December 12, 2025. During the encore, a video was played teasing an official collaboration between Ice Nine Kills and Scream 7, later revealed to be an original song for the film entitled "Twisting the Knife", which features guest vocals from Scream 7 star Mckenna Grace.

The band are confirmed to be appearing at Welcome to Rockville taking place in Daytona Beach, Florida in May 2026. In February 2026, the band was announced as part of the lineup for the Louder Than Life music festival in Louisville, scheduled to take place in September. On March 20, 2026, the band released a glam metal song titled "Hell or High Slaughter" under the name "Grave Diggler". The song is featured in the 2026 comedy horror film Ready or Not 2: Here I Come.

In May 2026 Armellino announced that he lent his speaking and singing voice for the character of Deckard 'Dex' Voltaire in the video game Dead as Disco.

In June 2026, Ice Nine Kills announced the headline "March In Silence Tour" across Europe, with a notable show at London's 'O2 Arena', their largest headline show in the UK to date.

On June 15, 2026, Ice Nine Kills announced an official collaboration with the video game Dead by Daylight with their new single "Play Dead". A corresponding music video was released on June 26, 2026.

In August 2026, it was announced that Ice Nine Kills would be making an original score for the Terror Tram at that year's Halloween Horror Nights. In October 2026, at Silver Scream Con 5, it was announced that the music would be released as an EP titled A Very Vicious Christmas on November 9. It was also announced that the band's next album, The Silver Scream 3: Every Flick in the Book, would release in 2027.

== Musical style ==
The group originally played a style of ska punk influenced by alternative rock and pop-punk. Since 2010 the band's style has been primarily described as metalcore or melodic metalcore, but also as post-hardcore, heavy metal, symphonic metal, melodic hardcore, and horror punk. Ice Nine Kills has described itself as "theatricore".

Some Ice Nine Kills' songs have also been categorized under a variety of genres outside their primary sound, including hard rock, post-metalcore, emo pop, psychobilly, pop-punk, hardcore punk, deathcore, death metal, symphonic death metal, technical death metal, industrial metal, and Neue Deutsche Härte.

== Band members ==
Current members

- Spencer Charnas – lead vocals (2000–present), additional rhythm guitar (2002–2009, 2019–present), bass (2002), drums (2002–2003)
- Ricky Armellino – rhythm guitar, backing and occasional lead vocals (2018–present)
- Joe Occhiuti – bass, lead vocals, keyboards (2019–present)
- Dan Sugarman – lead guitar, backing vocals (2019–present; touring hiatus 2021–present)
- Miles Dimitri Baker – rhythm and lead guitar, backing vocals (2023–present; touring musician 2023)
- Mike Cortada – drums (2024–present)

Current touring musicians

- Adam Reed – drums (2024–present; substitute for Mike Cortada)
- Scott Klopfenstein – trumpet (2025–present)
- John Christianson - trumpet (2025–present)
- Matt Appleton – saxophone (2025–present)
- Steve Sopchak – rhythm guitar, backing vocals (2025–present; substitute for Ricky Armellino)

Former members

- Andrew Justin Smith – bass, backing vocals (2002–2004)
- Hobie Boeschenstein – bass, backing vocals (2004–2008)
- Grant Newsted – drums (2003–2008)
- Dave Marvuglio – bass (2008–2009)
- Jeremy Schwartz – lead vocals, lead guitar, synthesizer (2000–2008, 2009), bass (2002), rhythm guitar (2008–2009)
- Dave Sieling – lead vocals (2009–2010)
- Shane Bisnett – bass, lead vocals (2009–2011; died 2019)) backing vocals (2009)
- Steve Koch – bass, lead vocals (2011–2013)
- Conor Sullivan – drums (2009–2018)
- Justin Morrow – bass (2013–2019), rhythm guitar (2009–2018), backing vocals (2009–2019)
- Joseph Merturi – lead guitar (2008)
- Justin "JD" DeBlieck – lead guitar, lead vocals, keyboards, programming, synthesizer (2009–2019)
- Patrick Galante – drums, backing vocals (2018–2024)

Former touring musicians

- Terrence Donnelly – rhythm guitar (2009–2010)
- Chris Laplante – lead guitar, backing vocals (2021; substitute for Dan Sugarman)
- Chris Kelly – lead guitar, backing vocals (2021–2023; substitute for Dan Sugarman)
- Doc Coyle – lead guitar (2023; substitute for Dan Sugarman)

== Discography ==
Studio albums

- Last Chance to Make Amends (2006)
- Safe Is Just a Shadow (2010)
- The Predator Becomes the Prey (2014)
- Every Trick in the Book (2015)
- The Silver Scream (2018)
- The Silver Scream 2: Welcome to Horrorwood (2021)
- The Silver Scream 3: Every Flick in the Book (2027)

== Accolades ==
Nominated work	Year	Award	Result
Ice Nine Kills	2017	Alternative Press Music Awards - Best Breakthrough Band	Nominated
Ice Nine Kills	2023	Rock Sound Awards 2023 - Best Live Act	Won
Ice Nine Kills	2024	Heavy Music Awards Awards 2024 - Best International Live Artist	Nominated
