= Suicide Silence discography =

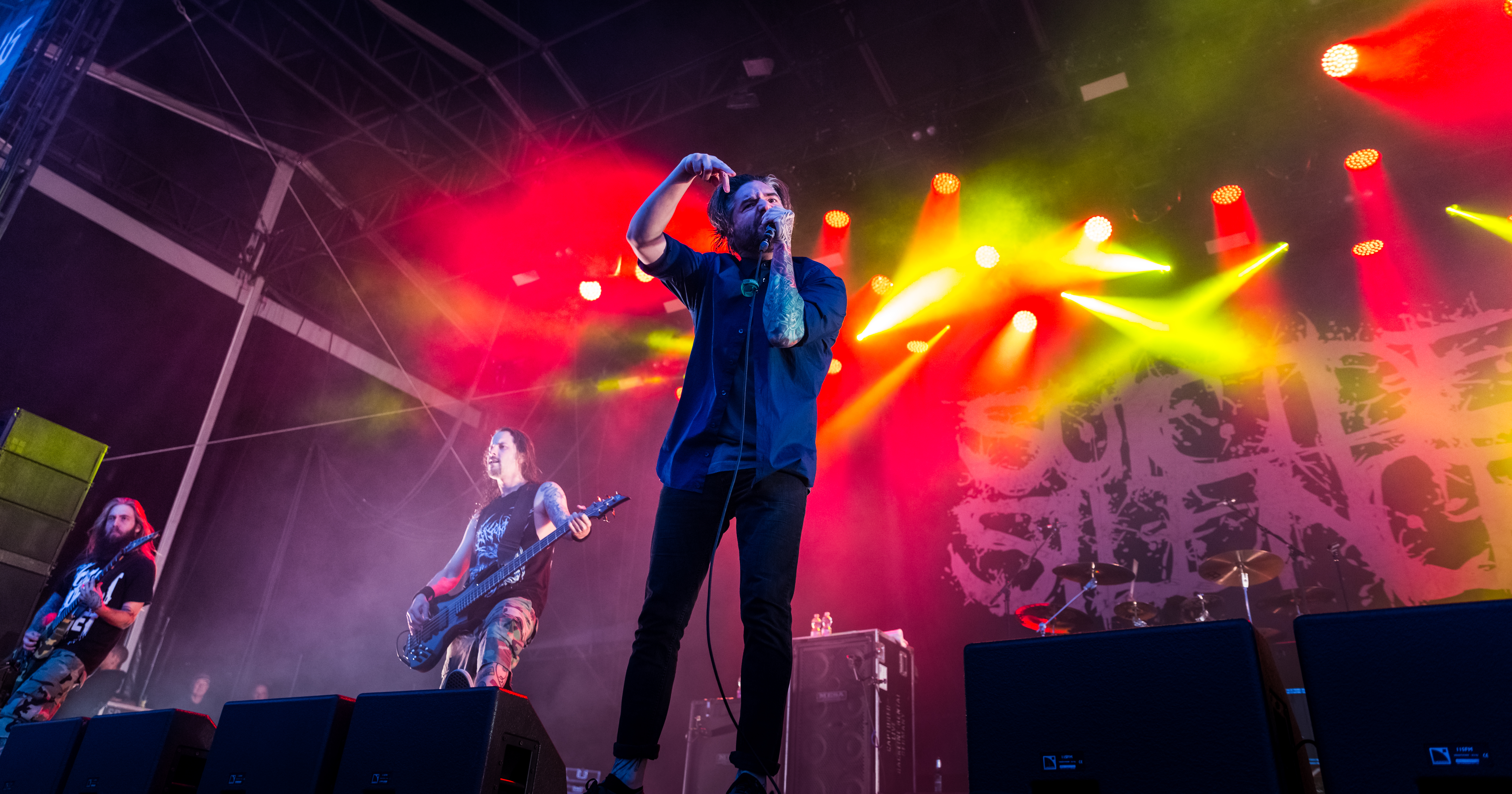
- Suicide Silence performing in 2017
- Studio albums: 7
- EPs: 3
- Singles: 23
- Music videos: 18
- Demo: 3
- Video albums: 1

American deathcore band Suicide Silence has released seven studio albums, three EPs, twenty-three singles, nineteen music videos, three demo albums, and one video album.

== Studio albums ==
List of studio albums, with selected chart positions
Title	Album details	Peak chart positions									
Title	Album details	US	US Rock	US Hard Rock	US Indie	US Vinyl	AUS	AUT	BEL	GER	UK
The Cleansing	Released: September 18, 2007; Label: Century Media; Formats: CD, LP, DL	94	—	13	—	—	—	—	—	—	—
No Time to Bleed	Released: June 30, 2009; Label: Century Media; Formats: CD, LP, DL	32	12	6	—	—	—	—	—	—	—
The Black Crown	Released: July 12, 2011; Label: Century Media; Formats: CD, LP, DL	28	7	3	6	—	—	—	—	63	—
You Can't Stop Me	Released: July 15, 2014; Label: Nuclear Blast; Formats: CD, LP, DL	16	4	2	2	—	30	43	136	24	84
Suicide Silence	Released: February 24, 2017; Label: Nuclear Blast; Formats: CD, LP, DL	163	30	7	8	9	78	—	—	98	—
Become the Hunter	Released: February 14, 2020; Label: Nuclear Blast; Formats: CD, LP, DL	—	—	21	46	—	—	—	—	85	—
Remember... You Must Die	Released: March 10, 2023; Label: Century Media; Formats: CD, LP, DL	—	—	—	—	—	—	—	—	—	—
"—" denotes a recording that did not chart or was not released in that territory.

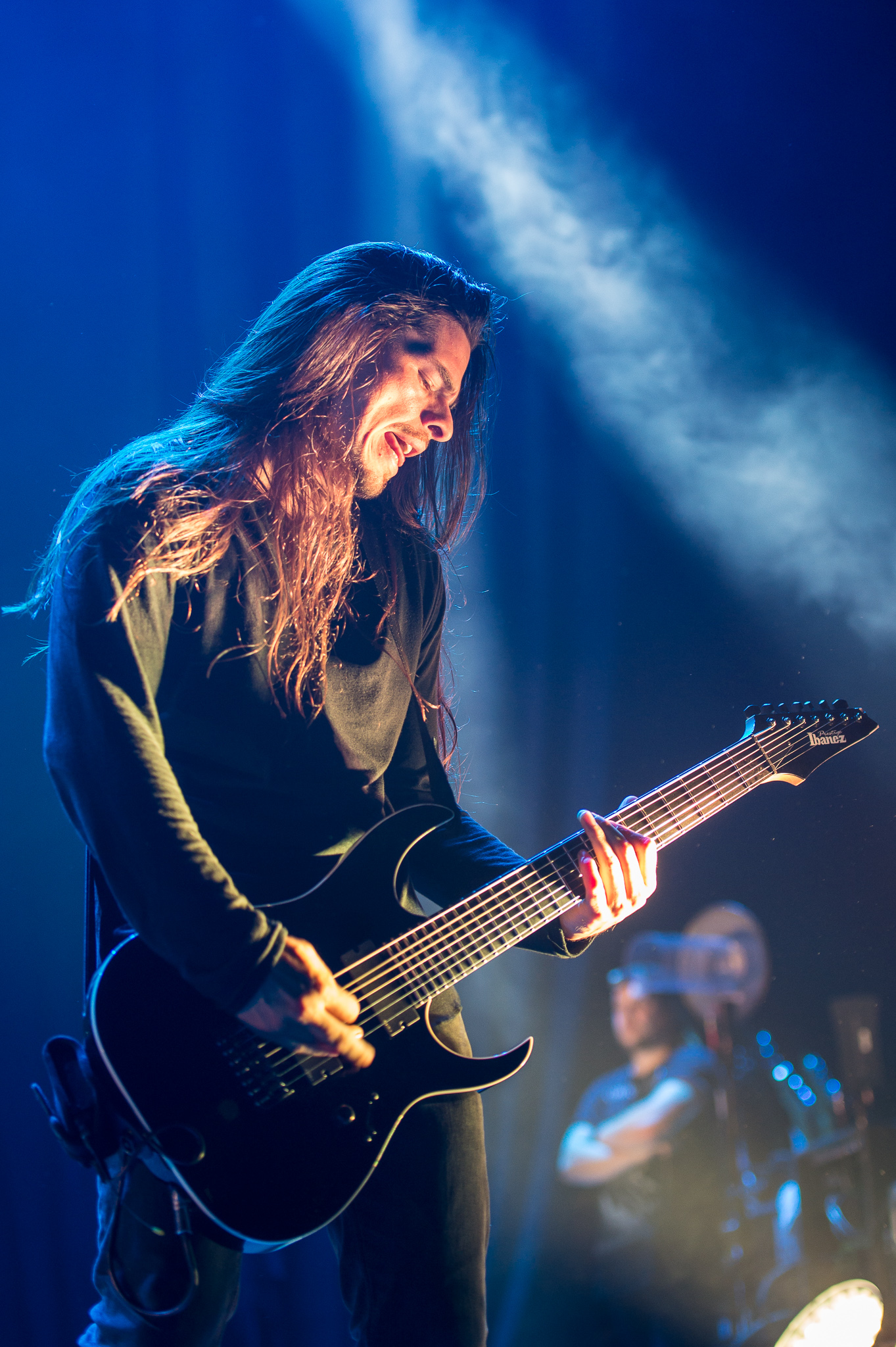
Guitarist Chris Garza (pictured) is the only member that has appeared on every Suicide Silence release to date.

== Extended plays ==
List of extended plays
Title	EP details
Suicide Silence	Released: September 30, 2005; Label: Third Degree; Format: CD
Sacred Words	Released: October 23, 2015; Label: Nuclear Blast; Format: DL

== Video albums ==
List of video albums, with selected chart positions
Title	Album details	Peak chart positions		
Title	Album details	US Indie	BEL	GER
Ending Is the Beginning: The Mitch Lucker Memorial Show	Released: February 18, 2014; Label: Century Media; Formats: DVD, Blu-ray, CD	12	197	73

== Live albums ==
List of live albums
Title	Album details
Live & Mental (Live)	Released: July 12, 2019; Label: Nuclear Blast; Formats: DL

== Compilations ==
List of compilation albums
Title	Album details
Rare Ass Shit	Released: June 14, 2019; Label: Independent; Formats: DL

== Demos ==
List of demo albums
Title	Demo details
Death Awaits	Released: 2003; Label: Independent; Format: CD
Suicide Silence	Released: 2004; Label: Independent; Format: CD
Family Guy Demo	Released: 2004; Label: Independent; Format: DL
Demo 2006	Released: 2006; Label: Independent; Format: DL

== Singles ==
Year	Song	Album
2008	"Green Monster"	The Cleansing
2009	"Wake Up"	No Time to Bleed
2010	"Disengage"	No Time to Bleed
2011	"No Time to Bleed"	No Time to Bleed
2011	"Human Violence"	The Black Crown
2011	"You Only Live Once"	The Black Crown
2011	"Slaves to Substance"	The Black Crown
2011	"Fuck Everything"	The Black Crown
2014	"Cease to Exist"	You Can't Stop Me
2014	"Don't Die"	You Can't Stop Me
2014	"Monster Within"	You Can't Stop Me
2017	"Doris"	Suicide Silence
2017	"Silence"	Suicide Silence
2019	"Meltdown"	Become the Hunter
2019	"Love Me to Death"	Become the Hunter
2019	"Feel Alive"	Become the Hunter
2020	"Two Steps"	Become the Hunter
2020	"Overlord"	Non-album single
2022	"Thinking in Tongues"	Non-album single
2022	"You Must Die"	Remember... You Must Die
2022	"Capable of Violence (N.F.W.)"	Remember... You Must Die
2022	"Alter of Self"	Remember... You Must Die
2023	"Dying Life"	Remember... You Must Die
2026	"Graceless"	Graceless
2026	"Make Your Exit"	Graceless

=== Promotional singles ===
Year	Song	Album
2007	"Bludgeoned to Death"	The Cleansing
2014	"Inherit the Crown"	You Can't Stop Me
