= 2019 in downloadable songs for the Rock Band series =

- Songs released: 125
- Packs released: 6
- Albums released: 0

The Rock Band series of music video games supports downloadable songs for the Xbox One and PlayStation 4 versions through the consoles' respective online services. Users can download songs on a track-by-track basis, with many of the tracks also offered as part of a "song pack" or complete album at a discounted rate.

== List of songs released in 2019 ==
The following table lists the available songs for the Rock Band series released in 2019. All songs available in packs are also available as individual song downloads on the same date, unless otherwise noted. Dates listed are the initial release of songs on PlayStation Network and Xbox Live.

Starting from October 6, 2015, all music added to the downloadable content catalog is exclusive to Rock Band 4. In addition, due to changes in the charting format and gameplay of Rock Band 4, the released songs no longer support keyboard or Pro guitar and bass (future downloadable content will continue to support vocal harmonies and Pro drum charts), and most songs no longer display "family friendly" or "supervision recommended" ratings. Downloadable content from previous Rock Band titles (excepting The Beatles: Rock Band) is forward-compatible in Rock Band 4 within the same system family (Xbox 360 downloads are usable in the Xbox One version and PlayStation 3 downloads are usable in the PlayStation 4 version) at no additional cost.

Song title	Artist	Year	Genre	Single / Pack name	Release date
"Peace Sells" (Note: Song was previously included in Rock Band 2.)	Megadeth	1986	Metal	Single	Jan 3, 2019
"Angel of Death"	Slayer	1986	Metal	Single	Jan 3, 2019
"Starlight"	BABYMETAL	2018	Metal	Single	Jan 10, 2019
"When Legends Rise"	Godsmack	2018	Nu-Metal	Single	Jan 10, 2019
"Forever in Your Hands" (Note: Song was previously released as part of the Rock Band Network.)	All That Remains	2008	Metal	Single	Jan 17, 2019
"Hey There Mr. Brooks"	Asking Alexandria	2009	Metal	Single	Jan 17, 2019
"Remedy"	Seether	2005	Metal	Single	Jan 17, 2019
"Learn to Fly" (Note: Song was previously included in Rock Band.)	Foo Fighters	1999	Alternative	Single	Jan 24, 2019
"The Hand That Feeds"	Nine Inch Nails	2005	Rock	Single	Jan 24, 2019
"Shame"	Elle King	2018	Alternative	Single	Jan 31, 2019
"Body Talks"	The Struts	2018	Rock	Single	Jan 31, 2019
"Gasoline"	The Bouncing Souls	2010	Alternative	Single	Feb 7, 2019
"The Triumph"	Jeff Williams ft. Casey Lee Williams	2018	Rock	Single	Feb 7, 2019
"Lady in a Blue Dress"	Senses Fail	2004	Alternative	Single	Feb 7, 2019
"Push"	Matchbox Twenty	1996	Alternative	Single	Feb 14, 2019
"The Reason"	Hoobastank	2004	Alternative	Single	Feb 14, 2019
"Wagon Wheel"	Darius Rucker	2013	Country	Single	Feb 21, 2019
"Bitch"	Meredith Brooks	1997	Alternative	Single	Feb 21, 2019
"Farewell, Mona Lisa"	The Dillinger Escape Plan	2010	Metal	Single	Feb 28, 2019
"Bleed"	Meshuggah	2008	Metal	Single	Feb 28, 2019
"[&] Delinquents"	Woe, Is Me	2010	Rock	Single	Feb 28, 2019
"Drown"	Bring Me the Horizon	2015	Nu-Metal	Bring Me the Horizon 01	Mar 7, 2019
"MANTRA"	Bring Me the Horizon	2019	Nu-Metal	Bring Me the Horizon 01	Mar 7, 2019
"Pray for Plagues"	Bring Me the Horizon	2006	Nu-Metal	Bring Me the Horizon 01	Mar 7, 2019
"Paradise"	Coldplay	2011	Alternative	Single	Mar 14, 2019
"Uma Thurman"	Fall Out Boy	2014	Pop-Rock	Single	Mar 14, 2019
"Superposition"	Young the Giant	2018	Alternative	Single	Mar 21, 2019
"When the Seasons Change"	Five Finger Death Punch	2018	Metal	Single	Mar 21, 2019
"Lemon Meringue Tie"	Dance Gavin Dance	2007	Indie Rock	Single	Mar 28, 2019
"Caraphernelia"	Pierce the Veil	2010	Emo	Single	Mar 28, 2019
"Battle Royale"	The Word Alive	2009	Metal	Single	Mar 28, 2019
"S.O.S."	The Glorious Sons	2017	Rock	Single	Apr 4, 2019
"Do Your Worst"	Rival Sons	2019	Rock	Single	Apr 4, 2019
"If You Can't Hang"	Sleeping With Sirens	2011	Emo	Single	Apr 11, 2019
"The Attitude Song"	Steve Vai	1984	Rock	Single	Apr 11, 2019
"Seven"	Sunny Day Real Estate	1994	Alternative	Single	Apr 11, 2019
"I'm Gonna Be (500 Miles)"	The Proclaimers	1988	Rock	Single	Apr 18, 2019
"La Bamba"	Los Lobos	1987	Pop-Rock	Single	Apr 18, 2019
"Do Not Disturb"	Halestorm	2018	Rock	Single	Apr 25, 2019
"Flag in the Ground"	Sonata Arctica	2009	Metal	Single	Apr 25, 2019
"Disengage"	Suicide Silence	2009	Metal	Single	Apr 25, 2019
"Hold On"	All That Remains	2010	Metal	Single	May 2, 2019
"The Gun Show"	In This Moment	2010	Metal	Single	May 2, 2019
"Harmony Hall"	Vampire Weekend	2019	Indie Rock	Single	May 2, 2019
"It's Complicated"	A Day to Remember	2010	Punk	Single	May 9, 2019
"Longshot"	Catfish and the Bottlemen	2019	Indie Rock	Single	May 9, 2019
"Nemesis"	Arch Enemy	2005	Metal	Single	May 16, 2019
"Over My Head"	Judah & the Lion	2019	Alternative	Single	May 16, 2019
"Night on Bald Mountain (Mussorgsky)"	Paul Henry Smith & The Fauxharmonic Orchestra	2010	Classical	Single	May 16, 2019
"The Serpentine Offering"	Dimmu Borgir	2007	Metal	Single	May 23, 2019
"Salvation"	The Strumbellas	2019	Alternative	Single	May 23, 2019
"You Only Live Once"	Suicide Silence	2011	Metal	Single	May 30, 2019
"Tourniquet"	Breaking Benjamin	2018	Alternative	Single	May 30, 2019
"The Waiting One"	All That Remains	2010	Metal	Single	Jun 6, 2019
"When Am I Gonna Lose You"	Local Natives	2019	Alternative	Single	Jun 6, 2019
"Wake Up"	Suicide Silence	2009	Metal	Single	Jun 6, 2019
"The Difference Between Medicine and Poison is in the Dose"	Circa Survive	2007	Alternative	Single	Jun 13, 2019
"If I'm James Dean, You're Audrey Hepburn"	Sleeping With Sirens	2010	Emo	Single	Jun 13, 2019
"Berzerker"	After the Burial	2009	Metal	Single	Jun 20, 2019
"We Are Not Anonymous"	Unearth	2008	Metal	Single	Jun 20, 2019
"Shallow Waters"	Amberian Dawn	2009	Metal	Single	Jun 27, 2019
"Lexington (Joey Pea-Pot With a Monkey Face)"	Chiodos	2007	Emo	Single	Jun 27, 2019
"Sucker"	Jonas Brothers	2019	Pop-Rock	Single	Jul 2, 2019
"High Hopes"	Panic! at the Disco	2018	Emo	Single	Jul 2, 2019
"Days Without"	All That Remains	2008	Metal	Single	Jul 11, 2019
"Change"	The Revivalists	2018	Alternative	Single	Jul 11, 2019
"Kick Some Ass '09"	Stroke 9	2010	Rock	Single	Jul 11, 2019
"100 Bad Days"	AJR	2019	Pop-Rock	Single	Jul 18, 2019
"Caves"	Chiodos	2010	Emo	Single	Jul 18, 2019
"Requiem for a Dying Song"	Flogging Molly	2008	Punk	Single	Jul 18, 2019
"For We Are Many"	All That Remains	2010	Metal	Single	Jul 25, 2019
"Obfuscation"	Between the Buried and Me	2009	Prog	Single	Jul 25, 2019
"Alligator"	Of Monsters and Men	2019	Indie Rock	Single	Jul 25, 2019
"The Plot to Bomb the Panhandle"	A Day to Remember	2007	Punk	Single	Aug 1, 2019
"The Final Episode (Let's Change the Channel)"	Asking Alexandria	2009	Metal	Single	Aug 1, 2019
"Blame It on My Youth"	Blink-182	2019	Punk	Single	Aug 1, 2019
"Undone"	All That Remains	2008	Metal	Single	Aug 8, 2019
"Very Busy People"	The Limousines	2010	Alternative	Single	Aug 8, 2019
"Gloria"	The Lumineers	2019	Indie Rock	Single	Aug 8, 2019
"Have Faith in Me"	A Day to Remember	2009	Punk	Single	Aug 15, 2019
"Hurt"	Oliver Tree	2019	Alternative	Single	Aug 15, 2019
"Jumpers"	Sleater-Kinney	2005	Indie Rock	Single	Aug 15, 2019
"Battles and Brotherhood"	3 Inches of Blood	2009	Metal	Single	Aug 22, 2019
"Missed Connection"	The Head and the Heart	2019	Alternative	Single	Aug 22, 2019
"The Hounds of Anubis"	The Word Alive	2010	Metal	Single	Aug 22, 2019
"Robots May Break Your Heart"	Riverboat Gamblers	2008	Punk	Single	Aug 29, 2019
"Entertain"	Sleater-Kinney	2005	Indie Rock	Single	Aug 29, 2019
"Old Town Road (Remix)"	Lil Nas X ft. Billy Ray Cyrus	2019	Country	Single	Sep 5, 2019
"21"	H.E.R.	2019	R&B/Soul/Funk	Single	Sep 12, 2019
"Buster Voodoo"	Rodrigo y Gabriela	2009	Rock	Single	Sep 12, 2019
"sugar honey ice & tea"	Bring Me the Horizon	2019	Nu-Metal	Single	Sep 19, 2019
"When I'm Gone"	Dirty Honey	2019	Rock	Single	Sep 19, 2019
"Highway to Oblivion"	DragonForce	2019	Metal	Single	Sep 26, 2019
"For the Love of God (Live)"	Steve Vai	2009	Rock	Single	Sep 26, 2019
"The Mob Goes Wild"	Clutch	2004	Rock	Single	Oct 3, 2019
"This City Made Us"	The Protomen	2015	Rock	Single	Oct 3, 2019
"Two Shots" (Note: Song is available at no cost.)	Duck & Cover	2019	Punk	4th Anniversary Free DLC Pack	Oct 10, 2019
"Don't Let Her Go"	Newfane	2019	Alternative	4th Anniversary Free DLC Pack	Oct 10, 2019
"Time for Crime"	ORION	2019	Pop/Dance/Electronic	4th Anniversary Free DLC Pack	Oct 10, 2019
"Fall Apart"	Shocked Laura	2019	Pop/Dance/Electronic	4th Anniversary Free DLC Pack	Oct 10, 2019
"Blue on Black"	Five Finger Death Punch	2018	Metal	Single	Oct 17, 2019
"Trouble"	Five Finger Death Punch	2017	Metal	Single	Oct 17, 2019
"You're Gonna Say Yeah!"	Hushpuppies	2005	Rock	Single	Oct 24, 2019
"Might Be Right"	White Reaper	2019	Alternative	Single	Oct 24, 2019
"Feed My Frankenstein"	Alice Cooper	1991	Rock	Single	Oct 31, 2019
"Unsainted"	Slipknot	2019	Nu-Metal	Single	Oct 31, 2019
"CHAMPION"	Bishop Briggs	2019	Alternative	Single	Nov 7, 2019
"Good Things Fall Apart"	Illenium & Jon Bellion	2019	Pop/Dance/Electronic	Single	Nov 7, 2019
"Sequestered in Memphis"	The Hold Steady	2008	Indie Rock	Single	Nov 14, 2019
"You're A Wolf"	Sea Wolf	2007	Indie Rock	Single	Nov 14, 2019
"Dear Insanity"	Asking Alexandria	2011	Metal	Single	Nov 21, 2019
"Morte et Dabo"	Asking Alexandria	2011	Metal	Single	Nov 21, 2019
"Back Foot"	Dinosaur Pile-Up	2019	Rock	The Riff Pack	Nov 26, 2019
"Welcome Home"	Hellyeah	2019	Rock	The Riff Pack	Nov 26, 2019
"Taste of Regret"	Of Mice & Men	2019	Metal	The Riff Pack	Nov 26, 2019
"Prom Queen"	Beach Bunny	2018	Alternative	The New Rock Pack	Dec 5, 2019
"Panic Attack"	The Glorious Sons	2019	Rock	The New Rock Pack	Dec 5, 2019
"16"	Highly Suspect	2019	Alternative	The New Rock Pack	Dec 5, 2019
"Crush"	Dave Matthews Band	1998	Rock	Wax Eclectic Pack	Dec 12, 2019
"Blind Leading the Blind"	Mumford & Sons	2019	Rock	Wax Eclectic Pack	Dec 12, 2019
"One Kind of Solomon"	The New Pornographers	2019	Alternative	Wax Eclectic Pack	Dec 12, 2019
"bad guy"	Billie Eilish	2019	Pop/Dance/Electronic	Headliners Pack	Dec 19, 2019
"Orphans"	Coldplay	2019	Alternative	Headliners Pack	Dec 19, 2019
"Take What You Want"	Post Malone ft. Ozzy Osbourne & Travis Scott	2019	Pop-Rock	Headliners Pack	Dec 19, 2019
