= Ending Is the Beginning: The Mitch Lucker Memorial Show =

Video by Suicide Silence
- Released: February 18, 2014
- Recorded: December 21, 2012
- Genre: Deathcore
- Length: 84 minutes
- Label: Century Media

Suicide Silence chronology
The Black Crown (2011)	Ending Is the Beginning: The Mitch Lucker Memorial Show (2014)	You Can't Stop Me (2014)

Ending Is the Beginning: The Mitch Lucker Memorial Show is a live video album by American deathcore band Suicide Silence. It was released on CD/DVD/Blu-ray on February 18, 2014. The performance was organized as a memorial to founding Suicide Silence vocalist Mitch Lucker, after his death from injuries sustained by a motorcycle accident on November 1, 2012. The title is derived from the title of the opening track of their debut self-titled EP.

The release was dedicated to late vocalist Mitch Lucker and his daughter, Kenadee Lucker.

== Track listing ==
No.	Track	Length	Album	Year	Guest vocalist
1	"Destruction of a Statue"	3:26	Suicide Silence	2005	Jonny Davy of Job for a Cowboy
2	"Distorted Thought of Addiction"	3:58	Suicide Silence	2005	Greg Wilburn, ex-Fit for an Autopsy, ex-The Devastated, ex-Oblige
3	"Ending Is the Beginning"	2:50	Suicide Silence	2005	Brook Reeves of Impending Doom
4	"Bludgeoned to Death"	2:53	The Cleansing	2007	Ricky Hoover, Ov Sulfur, ex-Suffokate
5	"Unanswered"	2:36	The Cleansing	2007	Phil Bozeman of Whitechapel
6	"Girl of Glass"	3:05	The Cleansing	2007	Myke Terry, Volumes, ex-Bury Your Dead
7	"The Price of Beauty"	3:07	The Cleansing	2007	Danny Worsnop of Asking Alexandria
8	"No Pity for a Coward"	3:39	The Cleansing	2007	Johnny Plague of Winds of Plague
9	"Disengage"	4:21	No Time to Bleed	2009	Cameron "Big Chocolate" Argon of Disfiguring the Goddess, ex-Abominable Putridity, ex-Malodorous
10	"No Time to Bleed"	3:32	No Time to Bleed	2009	Burke VanRaalte, Declaim, ex-With Dead Hands Rising
11	"Smoke"	3:54	No Time to Bleed	2009	Anthony Notarmaso of After the Burial
12	"Wake Up"	4:00	No Time to Bleed	2009	Tim Lambesis of As I Lay Dying & Austrian Death Machine
13	"March to the Black Crown"	1:12	The Black Crown	2011	N/A
14	"Slaves to Substance"	3:45	The Black Crown	2011	Hernan "Eddie" Hermida then of All Shall Perish, later joined Suicide Silence
15	"O.C.D."	3:34	The Black Crown	2011	Austin Carlile, ex-Of Mice & Men, ex-Attack Attack!
16	"Fuck Everything"	4:52	The Black Crown	2011	Chad Gray of Mudvayne & Hellyeah
17	"Die Young" (Black Sabbath cover)	5:30	Heaven and Hell	1980	Robb Flynn of Machine Head
18	"Roots Bloody Roots" (Sepultura cover)	4:05	Roots	1996	Max Cavalera of Sepultura & Soulfly
19	"Engine No. 9" (Deftones cover)	4:28	Adrenaline	1995	Mitch Lucker (via recording)
20	"You Only Live Once"	4:31	The Black Crown	2011	Randy Blythe of Lamb of God

== Credits ==
Suicide Silence

- Mitch Lucker – lead vocals on "Engine No. 9" (recording only)
- Chris Garza – rhythm guitar
- Mark Heylmun – lead guitar (tracks 4–20), bass guitar on "Destruction of a Statue", "Distorted Thought of Addiction", and "Ending Is the Beginning"
- Alex Lopez – drums (tracks 4–20)
- Dan Kenny – bass guitar (tracks 4–20)

Additional musicians

- Jonny Davy – lead vocals on "Destruction of a Statue"
- Greg Wilburn – lead vocals on "Distorted Thought of Addiction"
- Brook Reeves – lead vocals on "Ending Is the Beginning"
- Ricky Hoover – lead vocals on "Bludgeoned to Death"
- Phil Bozeman – lead vocals on "Unanswered"
- Myke Terry – lead vocals on "Girl of Glass"
- Danny Worsnop – lead vocals on "The Price of Beauty"
- Johnny Plague – lead vocals on "No Pity for a Coward"
- Cameron "Big Chocolate" Argon – lead vocals on "Disengage"
- Burke Vanraalte – lead vocals on "No Time to Bleed"
- Anthony Notarmaso – lead vocals on "Smoke"
- Tim Lambesis – lead vocals on "Wake Up"
- Hernan "Eddie" Hermida – lead vocals on "Slaves to Substance"
- Austin Carlile – lead vocals on "OCD"
- Chad Gray – lead vocals on "Fuck Everything"
- Robb Flynn – lead vocals, acoustic guitar on "Die Young", lead guitar on "You Only Live Once"
- Max Cavalera – lead vocals, lead guitar on "Roots Bloody Roots"
- Randy Blythe – lead vocals on "You Only Live Once"
- Josh Goddard – drums on "Destruction of a Statue", "Distorted Thought of Addiction", and "Ending Is the Beginning"
- Rick Ash – lead guitar on "Destruction of a Statue", "Distorted Thought of Addiction", and "Ending Is the Beginning"
- Scott Proctor – acoustic guitar on "Die Young", guitar tech

Production

- Jose Mangin – host
- Jerry Clubb – executive producer, production design, supervising editor
- James Lynch – producer, production design
- Jeremy Schott – producer, video editor, camera operator, director, editor
- Zafer Ulkucu – producer
- Josh Gilbert – post-production audio mixing, live audio engineering
- Joseph McQueen – post-production audio mixing, live audio engineering
- Daniel Abell – camera operator
- Dalton Blanco – camera operator
- Steven Burhoe – camera operator, director, editor
- Robbie Tassaro – camera operator
- Roger Timm – camera operator
- Mark Weinberg – camera operator
- Abe Portillo – jib operator
- Corey Clark – assistant camera
- Derrell Stanfield – assistant camera
- Lizzy Gonzalez – backstage videography, photography, camera operator
- Evan Meszaros – live audio engineering
- John Montes – live audio engineering
- Adam Elmakias – photography
- Sonny Guillen – photography
- Jerry John Nicholl – photography
- Scott Snyder – lighting
- Jim Destefano – visuals
- DJ Big Wiz – visuals
- Ben Lionetti – technician
- Trent Lopez – technician
- Kevin Martin – technician
- Aubin A Sadiki – Cover Art
- Chelsea Chase – artist coordinator
- Carlee Lowe – artist coordinator
- Andy Serrao – promoter
- Noah Russel – backstage management
- Rob Mirhadi – merchandise
- Megan Moore – merchandise
- Joe Potenti – merchandise
- Bailey Schrock – merchandise
- Chelsie Smith – merchandise
- Cody Swift – merchandise
- Stephanie Fiorse – will call
- Sarah Latis – production assistant
- Mike Ramsey – production assistant
