= Remember... You Must Die =

Studio album by Suicide Silence
- Released: March 10, 2023
- Genre: Deathcore
- Length: 39:30
- Label: Century Media
- Producer: Taylor Young

Suicide Silence chronology
Become the Hunter (2020)	Remember... You Must Die (2023)	Graceless (2026)

Remember... You Must Die is the seventh studio album by American deathcore band Suicide Silence. The album was released on March 10, 2023, through Century Media Records and was produced by Taylor Young.

== Background and promotion ==
In early 2022, Suicide Silence announced their return to Century Media Records, where they released their first three albums. On April 29, 2022, Lopez had departed the band. Ernie Iniguez, who had played drums on Become the Hunter, was announced as his live replacement for any upcoming tours. In June 2022, the band announced the title of the album along with a short audio clip. The album is set for release in early 2023.

On August 31, Suicide Silence released the first single and title track "You Must Die" along with a music video. On October 31, the band premiered the second single "Capable of Violence (N.F.W.)" along with an accompanying music video. On December 9, the band published third single titled "Alter of Self" and revealed the new album would be released on March 10, 2023. On February 8, 2023, one month before the album release, the band unveiled the fourth single "Dying Life" and its corresponding music video.

== Critical reception ==
Professional ratings
Review scores
Source	Rating
Blabbermouth.net	8.5/10
Distorted Sound	9/10
Kerrang!	3/5 stars
Louder Sound	3/5 stars
Metal Injection	8/10
Metal Storm	7/10
New Noise Magazine	5/5 stars
Rock 'N' Load	10/10
Rock Sins	8/10
Wall of Sound	8/10

The album received acclaim from critics. Dom Lawson from Blabbermouth.net gave the album 8.5 out of 10 and said: "We get the best of both worlds here. Firstly, Suicide Silence have reconnected with the dark energy that made them undisputed scene leaders in the first place. Secondly, the will to bend deathcore to their own perverse ends is as strong as ever. Remember... You Must Die is a joyous, obnoxious thing. Welcome the fuck back." Katie Bird of Distorted Sound scored the album 9 out of 10 and said: "Overall, Suicide Silence have showcased why they are still one of the greatest deathcore bands of all time. By going back to basics, they have shown that they are not afraid of their past. There is also some new experimentation thrown in, but it is not jarring enough to distract from the older sound. This album is a great starting point for newer fans, and one that older fans will be able to appreciate as well. Whilst some might consider the title to be extremely morbid, Remember... You Must Die reminds us to grab life by the horns, let loose, and have fun. Simply put, this is Suicide Silence once again at their very best." Kerrang! gave the album 3 out of 5 and stated: "As a way of reasserting themselves, Remember... You Must Die goes some way to reminding you just how deadly SS can be. The newer pack may have taken deathcore to even heavier places, but like Cannibal Corpse or Slayer, there's something reassuring about hearing them doing their thing this well so far in." Louder Sound gave the album a positive review and stated: "This is all well and good, tried and true, until you remember... this is fucking Suicide Silence! The masterminds behind The Cleansing should be at least a year ahead of everybody else, yet they've been swept away by Whitechapel and even newcomers Lorna Shore in the 'taking deathcore to rad new places' stakes. If they can't drive in new directions without flinging themselves off a cliff, this lot may end up in the back seat of the scene they popularised."

Metal Injection rated the album 8 out of 10 and stated, "With a sound firmly rooted in the familiar, if Become the Hunter wasn't enough to convince you that Suicide Silence are back on rails then Remember... You Must Die is hard-as-nails evidence that they have fully re-embraced the past. It runs the feel of classic, chugging deathcore through a raw death metal de-filter, while avoiding for the most part returning to a holding pattern rather than using momentum to take off. If you're looking for a dose of classic deathcore from one of the bands that defined what classic deathcore is, this is going to scratch that itch with a sledgehammer." New Noise Magazine praised the album saying, "With the return 'home' to Century Media, the label that released classics including No Time to Bleed (2009) and The Black Crown (2011), it's clear that things have come full circle for the deathcore originators." Rock 'N' Load praised the album saying, "Remember... You Must Die is the best record Suicide Silence has produced. Fact... Even personally being a fan from their demo days i can firmly state this is the final form of Suicide Silence. A raw, primitive band with the knowledge of crafting heavy, catchy deathcore for the ages. Diehards you will not be disappointed. I can promise you that!" Simon Crampton of Rock Sins rated the album 8 out of 10 and said: "It seems disingenuous to still refer to Suicide Silence as a Deathcore band, when they are clearly so much more and frankly outgrew that tag a very long time ago. Remember... You Must Die, is the most consistently well-rounded and effective album they have released in quite some time, a back to basics banger that should hopefully once again cement their place at the top of the tree for this generation of death metal bands." Wall of Sound gave the album a score 8/10 and saying: "Remember... You Must Die – or Memento mori in Latin – is built and designed with the old school Suicide Silence and deathcore fan in mind. If you've never been a fan of the group, this probably won't convert you – the playbook isn't being rewritten here. It would be completely remiss though for anyone who fell off the SS bandwagon in the previous years to not at least give this a chance. Naysayers may claim that this stylistic backpedal may be an attempt to merely win back fans – and perhaps there is an element of wanting to appeal to their fanbase. What is apparent is that Suicide Silence have genuinely put their whole being into writing a throwback effort – faking it or a lack of full commitment with music this intense is painfully obvious. For this alone, Remember... You Must Die is a resounding success. However, the new tracks carry the same legacy as material from stone cold classics The Cleansing and No Time to Bleed? Only time will tell."

== Track listing ==
Remember... You Must Die track listing
No.	Title	Length
1.	"Remember..."	0:51
2.	"You Must Die"	2:42
3.	"Capable of Violence (N.F.W.)"	3:44
4.	"Fucked for Life"	3:53
5.	"Kill Forever"	3:13
6.	"God Be Damned"	3:59
7.	"Alter of Self"	3:09
8.	"Endless Dark"	2:20
9.	"The Third Death"	3:30
10.	"Be Deceived"	3:00
11.	"Dying Life"	3:20
12.	"Full Void"	5:44
Total length:		39:30

== Personnel ==
Suicide Silence

- Hernan "Eddie" Hermida – vocals
- Mark Heylmun – lead guitar
- Chris Garza – rhythm guitar
- Dan Kenny – bass
- Ernie Iniguez – drums

Additional personnel

- Taylor Young – production, engineering, mixing
- Brad Boatright – mastering
