= Cease to Exist (song) =

Single by Suicide Silence

from the album You Can't Stop Me
- Released: May 6, 2014
- Genre: Deathcore
- Length: 3:42
- Label: Nuclear Blast
- Songwriters: Chris Garza, Hernan Hermida, Mark Heylmun, Dan Kenny, Alex Lopez
- Producer: Steve Evetts

Suicide Silence singles chronology
"Fuck Everything" (2011)	"Cease to Exist" (2014)	"Don't Die" (2014)

"Cease to Exist" is a song by American deathcore band Suicide Silence. The track was released as the first single from their fourth studio album, You Can't Stop Me on May 6, 2014. It was the band's first single with singer Hernan "Eddie" Hermida.

== Background ==
Eddie Hermida said "Cease to Exist" is "how much I hate pedophiles. I would go to great depths of pain to see people like that suffer the worst pain on earth imaginable!"

== Release ==
The song became available for online streaming on May 5, 2014. The song was released as a digital single the next day with a lyric video being released as well. The song was performed live for the first time at Rock Am Ring 2014 on June 6, 2014.

== Track listing ==
All music is composed by Suicide Silence.

Single
No.	Title	Length
1.	"Cease to Exist"	3:42
Total length:		3:42

== Personnel ==
Suicide Silence

- Hernan "Eddie" Hermida – vocals
- Mark Heylmun – lead guitar
- Daniel Kenny – bass
- Christopher Garza – rhythm guitar
- Alex Lopez – drums
