= Jose Mangin =

American radio and television personality (born 1977)

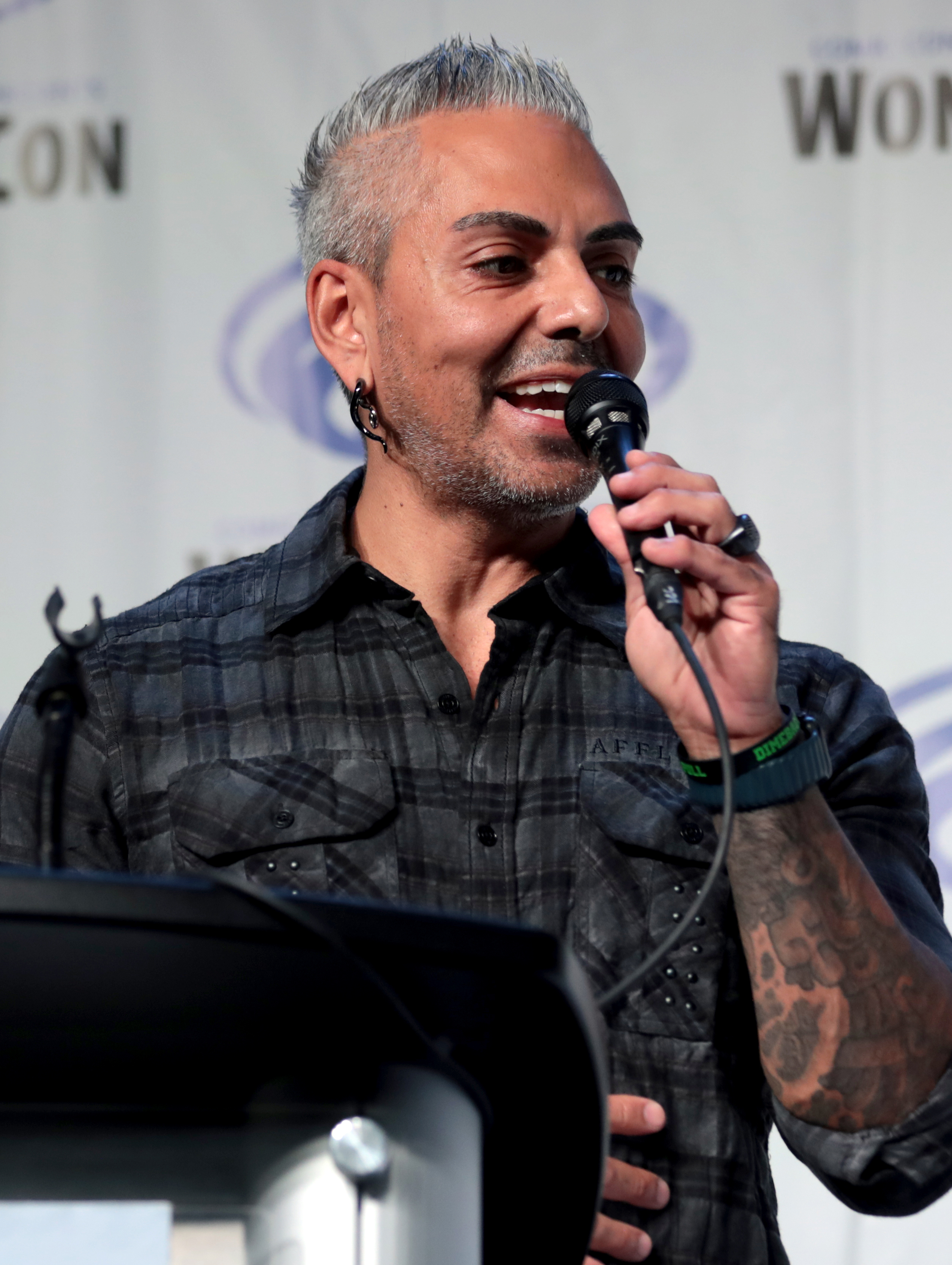
- Mangin speaking at WonderCon in 2022
- Born: April 12, 1977 (age 49); Phoenix, Arizona, U.S.
- Other name: Metal Ambassador
- Education: University of Arizona, University of Tennessee
- Occupations: Broadcaster; media personality; actor
- Years active: 1996–present
- Spouse: Melissa Mangin (m. 2001)
- Children: 2

Jose Mangin (born April 12, 1977) is a broadcaster, media personality, and actor. He is the program director and host of SiriusXM's Liquid Metal, Octane, and Ozzy's Boneyard stations. Mangin is the longest running rock host in the company's history, having worked with Sirius since September 2000.

== Early life and education ==
Mangin was born at St. Joseph's Hospital and Medical Center in Phoenix, Arizona, in 1977. He lived in Sierra Vista and Tucson before his family settled in Douglas, a town near the Mexico–United States border, where Mangin was raised.

Mangin was introduced to metal music in his youth by his cousins when he was in kindergarten, hearing Shout at the Devil by Mötley Crüe. In addition to metal, Mangin became interested in science in his youth after watching the 1988 film The Serpent and the Rainbow. In 1992, he went to his first concert, seeing Iron Maiden and Anthrax. During high school, Mangin played in a metal band called Damnation.

After graduating high school, Mangin received a full-ride scholarship to the University of Arizona (UA), where he majored in chemistry. He worked as the music director for KAMP, the UA campus radio station, creating the show Beyond The Pit. Mangin later attended graduate school at the University of Tennessee, studying to become a pharmacist. He also worked at WMFS-FM, a local radio station where he continued his Beyond The Pit show, during graduate school. Mangin won the Metal Director of the Year award in the Album Network magazine while at WMFS-FM, leading to other job offers. Mangin decided to pursue a career in radio and moved to New Jersey.

== Career ==
Mangin's first major radio interview was with Chuck Billy of Testament, taking place in 1996.

Mangin was initially hired by TVT Records, working as the company's metal director to promote bands like Sevendust, Nothingface and Nashville Pussy. After a few months, he discovered Sirius Satellite Radio, and reached out to executives to meet with them. Eventually, in September 2000, he was hired by the company to program the alternative rock en español channel and the metal channel, Hard Attack. After Sirius and XM Satellite Radio merged to create Sirius XM in 2008, Hard Attack became the broadcaster's Liquid Metal channel, of which Mangin continued to be the programmer and host. Mangin also hosts the Octane radio channel for Sirius XM.

In 2011, Mangin introduced Metallica before their headlining set at Yankee Stadium during the Big Four tour with Slayer, Megadeth, and Anthrax.

From 2011 to 2012, Mangin was the host of MTV's Headbangers Ball.

In 2013, Mangin became the director of artist relations for Affliction Clothing, working with artists to direct the company's musical branding. He has since become Affliction's vice president of brand management. Mangin broadcasts his shows from a studio at Affliction's headquarters in Seal Beach, California.

In 2016, Mangin co-hosted the Epiphone Revolver Music Awards with Dave Mustaine of Megadeth.

In 2022, Mangin was signed by Danny Wimmer Presents to serve as the "official host and backstage correspondent" for all of the production company's music festivals, which include Aftershock, Louder Than Life, Sonic Temple, and Welcome to Rockville. He has previously hosted the Carolina Rebellion, Knotfest, and Rock Allegiance festivals, and the Headbangers Boat cruise.

Since its start in 2022, Mangin has been the host of the Silver Scream Con, a horror convention created by the band Ice Nine Kills.

Mangin is a former co-owner of Riazul Tequila, having partially owned the brand until its sale in 2023. He is also a former brand ambassador for California's Finest, a marijuana cigarette company.

Mangin is the manager for Ladrones, a Guadalajara-based band that mixes metal, hip hop, and regional music from Mexico.

=== Headbang For Science ===
In 2021, Mangin founded Headbang For Science, a 501(c)(3) nonprofit charity and scholarship program for graduating high school students, undergraduates, or graduate students who are choosing to major in science or medicine, are struggling financially, have a 3.0 GPA, and are fans of metal music. Mangin came up with the idea for the charity after waking up from a dream in September 2014, wanting to combine "his love of science and heavy metal." Headbang For Science gave away its first scholarships in 2023, awarding $11,000 to three recipients.

== Filmography ==
=== Music videos ===
| Year | Song | Artist | Role |
|---|---|---|---|
| 2004 | "Setting Fire to Sleeping Giants" | The Dillinger Escape Plan | Actor |
| 2011 | "One Reason" | Straight Line Stitch | Actor |
| 2024 | "A Work of Art" | Ice Nine Kills | Actor |

=== Film ===
| Year | Title | Role |
|---|---|---|
| 2014 | As The Palaces Burn | Self |
| 2025 | If It Bleeds | Actor |

=== Television ===
| Years | Title | Role |
|---|---|---|
| 2004 - 2012 | LatiNation | Host |
| 2008 - 2012 | Headbangers Ball | Guest host (pre-2011), Host (2011 - 2012) |
| 2021 | Paradise City | Actor |
| 2025 | Better Luck than Chuck | Self |

== Collaborations ==
| Year | Song | Album | Artist |
|---|---|---|---|
| 2009 | "La Tumba" (featuring Jose Mangin) | The Reel | Vampire Mooose |
| 2013 | "We're All Gonna Die" (background vocals) | We're All Gonna Die | Generation Kill |
| 2013 | "I Want It All" (featuring Jose Mangin) | Oppression | Incite |
| 2016 | "Til the Break of Dawn" (featuring Jose Mangin) | Straight from the Barrio | Upon a Burning Body |
| 2017 | "Doris" (featuring Jose Mangin) | Suicide Silence | Suicide Silence |
| 2017 | "Excruciating" (featuring Jose Mangin) | Psychosis | Cavalera Conspiracy |

== Personal life ==
Mangin speaks Spanish fluently and is of Mexican-American lineage. Jose's father, Frank Mangin, was a politician.

Jose Mangin met his wife, Melissa, while the pair were working at TVT Records. They got married in 2001 and have two daughters.

After the death of Mangin's friend, Vinnie Paul, he inherited the 1997 Lincoln Town Car stretch limo formerly owned by the late Pantera drummer and Dimebag Darrell. Mangin crowdfunded the restoration of the vehicle.
