= Become the Hunter =

Studio album by Suicide Silence
- Released: February 14, 2020
- Genre: Deathcore
- Length: 39:47
- Label: Nuclear Blast
- Producer: Steve Evetts

Suicide Silence chronology
Suicide Silence (2017)	Become the Hunter (2020)	Remember... You Must Die (2023)

Become the Hunter is the sixth studio album by American deathcore band Suicide Silence. The album was released on February 14, 2020, through Nuclear Blast. Two years after its release, drummer Alex Lopez would depart from the band. Although Lopez is credited for drums on the album, they were actually recorded by Whitechapel's former touring drummer Ernie Iniguez, who later officially joined Suicide Silence in Lopez's place.

== Musical style ==
After the overwhelmingly negative fan reaction to the nu metal direction heard on the band's self-titled album, Become the Hunter features a return to the deathcore sound the band is known for. Additionally, Dom Lawson of Blabbermouth.net noted sludge metal influences on "Two Steps" and "In Hiding".

== Reception ==
Professional ratings
Review scores
Source	Rating
Blabbermouth.net	8/10
Distorted Sound	8/10
Exclaim!	6/10
Kerrang!	3/5 stars
Metal Injection	8.5/10

Become the Hunter received positive reviews from critics and has been hailed as the band's "return to form".

Blabbermouth.net's Dom Lawson called the album "the perfect follow-up to You Can't Stop Me", while Naomi Sanders of Distorted Sound called Become the Hunter "a massive step up from the last album."

A more mixed review come from Joe Smith-Engelhardt of Exclaim!, who stated "the new record isn't a perfect show from them, but it is a return to form." Smith-Engelhardt said the album feels like a logical follow up to You Can't Stop Me and praised the band's use of guitar solos on the album, saying "instead of shoehorning in a solo for every song, they sparingly bring them in and have a great structure to each one." He said "Skin Tight" was the weakest song on the album, citing its atmospheric instrumental section and vocal delivery, comparing those moments to Suicide Silence. The review concluded by saying "if you can pretend their last album never happened, it's a fantastic collection of songs and any fan of the genre will be able to find some things they like, but ultimately, it does feel like their switchback was done to save their career."

== Track listing ==
All lyrics are written by Eddie Hermida; all music is composed by Chris Garza, Mark Heylmun and Dan Kenny.

No.	Title	Length
1.	"Meltdown" (instrumental)	2:12
2.	"Two Steps"	3:22
3.	"Feel Alive"	3:29
4.	"Love Me to Death"	4:15
5.	"In Hiding"	2:57
6.	"Death's Anxiety"	3:13
7.	"Skin Tight"	4:10
8.	"The Scythe"	4:42
9.	"Serene Obscene"	4:25
10.	"Disaster Valley"	3:54
11.	"Become the Hunter" (featuring Darius Tehrani)	3:08
Total length:		39:47

== Personnel ==
Suicide Silence

- Hernan "Eddie" Hermida – vocals
- Mark Heylmun – lead guitar
- Chris Garza – rhythm guitar
- Dan Kenny – bass

Additional musicians

- Ernie Iniguez – drums
- Clinton Bradley – programming, sound design
- Darius Tehrani – additional vocals on track 11

Production

- Steve Evetts – production
- Josh Wilbur – mixing
- Ted Jensen – mastering
- Adrian Baxter – artwork, layout
- Rob Kimura – layout design
