= Suicide Silence (album) =

Studio album by Suicide Silence
- Released: February 24, 2017
- Recorded: Late 2016
- Studio: Blackout Chamber (Venice, California)
- Genre: Nu metal
- Length: 44:13
- Label: Nuclear Blast
- Producer: Ross Robinson

Suicide Silence chronology
You Can't Stop Me (2014)	Suicide Silence (2017)	Become the Hunter (2020)

Suicide Silence is the fifth studio album by American deathcore band Suicide Silence, released on February 24, 2017 by Nuclear Blast. The album is a notable departure from their signature deathcore style, pursuing a more 1990s influenced nu metal sound. Critical reviews were mixed, while fan response was generally negative. It is also the last to feature Alex Lopez on drums before his departure from the band in April 2022.

== Background and musical style ==
The album exhibits a significant shift from the band's deathcore style that they're known for to a nu metal style reminiscent of bands such as Korn, Deftones and Coal Chamber. The album was first announced to the public with headlines from coverage sites in December 2016 that the band claimed it would contain "mostly clean vocals", a vocal style that the band have largely avoided throughout most of their career. Bassist Dan Kenny and drummer Alex Lopez commented: "it's the first time [vocalist Eddie Hermida] has ever been confident enough to do it, but Eddie's always been a singer. There's a lot of singing in it, there's a lot of screaming in it, there's a lot of everything in it… there's melody in it."

Following this, the first single "Doris" was released to overwhelmingly negative reaction from fans.

== Reception ==
=== Reviews ===
Professional ratings
Review scores
Source	Rating
Blabbermouth.net	6/10
Exclaim!	1/10
Metal Hammer	2.5/5 stars
Metal Injection	6/10 stars
MetalSucks	3.5/5 stars

The album has received mixed reviews from critics. Joe Smith-Engelhardt of Exclaim! gave the album a 1/10 review, comparing it to "a garage band sloppily covering Korn and Deftones through a microphone they found in a dumpster". Rock Sound were also critical of the change in direction, claiming that the band had "shed the very thing that made them great", as were Metal Hammer, who found the band's decision "bewildering."

More positive feedback came from MetalSucks, who saw the album as "a weird art-metal album" comparable to Metallica's similarly controversial Lulu or St. Anger albums. While asserting that "Suicide Silence have never sounded this genuinely deranged", writer Axl Rosenberg summarized the record by saying that "I'm not sure that Suicide Silence is a great record, but it's certainly a good one, and it took balls to make it".

Metal Injection also gave the album a positive review, writing, "Their determination to create the art they want is noble, and in time we can hope that the band builds upon this new direction, and bring Suicide Silence back with a powerful, emotional, and individually unique voice."

In a mixed review from Blabbermouth.net, the site wrote, "Whether you like this album or you're one of the many casting digital stones, we've hit a repulsive point of no return."

=== Cover art ===
Joe DaVita of Loudwire said the album's cover artwork looks like "when you accidentally upload your promo photo as your album cover and it gets printed," and was included the album in his list of "60 Hilariously Awful Metal Album Covers".

=== Fans' reactions ===
The album's musical style and clean singing have received a largely negative reception from fans. Fan backlash to Suicide Silence's perceived drastic change in musical style was overwhelming, to the point that a Change.org petition calling for the album's release to be halted amassed over 5,000 signatures from disgruntled fans.

Loudwire, interviewing the band, noted that the English Wikipedia article for the album was frequently vandalized.

In response to fans' negativity of the album's style, Cannibal Corpse frontman George Fisher criticized the rampant backlash toward the album's use of clean vocals, saying, "obviously, fans are the lifeblood of this music, [...] But it doesn't give you the right to talk like you know Mitch, like 'oh, Mitch is rolling in his grave, with you guys doing clean vocals.' How the fuck do you know?"

Guitarist Chris Garza recalled in 2023 that attendance at the band's shows dropped significantly after the album's release.

=== Sales ===
First week sales for the album were 4,650 copies in the United States, which was 69% less than first week sales of their previous album You Can't Stop Me.

== Track listing ==
All tracks are written by Suicide Silence.

No.	Title	Length
1.	"Doris"	4:28
2.	"Silence"	4:40
3.	"Listen"	5:32
4.	"Dying in a Red Room"	4:45
5.	"Hold Me Up, Hold Me Down"	5:18
6.	"Run"	4:25
7.	"The Zero"	4:53
8.	"Conformity"	5:53
9.	"Don't Be Careful You Might Hurt Yourself"	4:20
Total length:		44:13

- Track 9 was originally named "Don't Be Careful You Might Get Hurt" and can still be found with that name on various websites.

== Personnel ==
Suicide Silence

- Hernan "Eddie" Hermida – vocals
- Mark Heylmun – lead guitar
- Chris Garza – rhythm guitar
- Dan Kenny – bass
- Alex Lopez – drums

Additional musicians

- Steve Krolikowski – additional vocals
- Jose Mangin – additional vocals

Personnel

- Ross Robinson – production
- Joe Barresi – mixing
- Dave Collins – mastering
- Monte Conner – A&R
- Dean Karr – cover photo
- Marcelo Vasco – cover design, layout
- D. Randall Blythe – photography

== Charts ==
Chart (2017)	Peak position
Australian Albums (ARIA)	78
German Albums (Offizielle Top 100)	98
US Billboard 200	163
US Top Hard Rock Albums (Billboard)	7
US Top Rock Albums (Billboard)	30
