= No Time to Bleed (song) =

Single by Suicide Silence

from the album No Time to Bleed
- Released: January 15, 2011
- Genre: Deathcore
- Length: 2:22
- Label: Century Media
- Songwriters: Chris Garza, Mark Heylmun, Alex Lopez, Mitch Lucker

Suicide Silence singles chronology
"Disengage" (2010)	"No Time to Bleed" (2011)	"Human Violence" (2011)

"No Time to Bleed" is a song by American deathcore band Suicide Silence. The song was released as the third and final single and is the title track from the band's second full-length album of the same name.

== Background ==
Like the band's previous single, "Disengage" the single is released as a 7" inch vinyl in limited edition, but is also available for download via iTunes, and features a dubstep-influenced remix of the song handled by Cameron "Big Chocolate" Argon as well as the album version of the track. The single was released on January 15, 2011.

== Track listing ==
1. "No Time to Bleed" - 2:22
2. "No Time to Bleed (Big Chocolate Remix)" - 4:57

== Personnel ==
Suicide Silence

- Mitch Lucker – vocals
- Mark Heylmun – lead guitar, bass guitar
- Chris Garza – rhythm guitar
- Alex Lopez – drums

Production

- Produced by Machine
- Artwork by Joshua Belanger
