= Liquid Metal (SiriusXM) =

- Broadcast area: United States; Canada
- Frequencies: Sirius XM Radio 40; Dish Network 6040

Programming
- Format: Active rock metalcore thrash metal death metal heavy metal

Ownership
- Owner: Sirius XM Radio

Technical information
- Class: Satellite Radio Station

Links
- Website: www.siriusxm.com/channels/liquid-metal

Liquid Metal is a Sirius XM Radio station broadcasting a heavy metal format. It is carried on Sirius XM Radio channel 40 and DISH Network channel 6040.

Ian Christe, author of the book Sound of the Beast: The Complete Headbanging History of Heavy Metal, hosts a weekly radio show known as Bloody Roots that provides an in-depth look at the history of the genre.

In 2022, Virginia legislator Danica Roem appeared as a guest host on the station to share her appreciation of heavy metal music.

On July 28, 2023, Liquid Metal temporarily became Pantera Radio, a radio station that played Pantera songs and some other metal songs.

== Hosts ==
- Ian Christe
- Jose Mangin
- Shawn Winkler

== Core artists ==
- Metallica
- Pantera
- Slayer
- Lamb of God
- Slipknot
- Machine Head
- Soulfly
- Megadeth
- Hatebreed
- Anthrax
