= Suicide Silence (EP) =

EP by Suicide Silence
- Released: September 30, 2005
- Genre: Deathcore, brutal death metal
- Length: 16:14
- Label: Third Degree, In at the Deep End, SOS

Suicide Silence chronology
Suicide Silence (2005)	The Cleansing (2007)

Suicide Silence is the debut EP by American deathcore band Suicide Silence. Its original release was on September 30, 2005 through Riverside local label Third Degree Records. It was officially reissued by British label In at the Deep End Records in 2006. The EP is also the only studio release with guitarist Rick Ash and drummer Josh Goddard, with the former leaving the band shortly after the EP's recording. Goddard stayed until May 2006, citing "differences between the band members" as the reason for leaving.

== Background ==
The EP was recorded during the summer of 2005 and was released originally on September 30, 2005 through Third Degree Records as the band's first ever studio-quality release. It was released one year before the band's third demo, which in turn led to their signing to Century Media. After the release of their 2006 demo, the Suicide Silence EP was re-released through British label In at the Deep End Records on September 30, 2006, exactly one year since its original pressing. The EP promoted Suicide Silence to greater heights, providing an ever-expanding fan base.

The EP is released as an Enhanced CD and contains a QuickTime file for “Destruction of a Statue (Live)”, a video that is viewable on Mac and Microsoft Windows personal computers.

The song "Ending Is the Beginning" was re-recorded for the band's 2014 album, You Can't Stop Me. The song's name was also later used as the inspiration for the title of the band's 2014 live video album, Ending Is the Beginning: The Mitch Lucker Memorial Show.

== Track listing ==
No.	Title	Length
1.	"Ending Is the Beginning"	2:37
2.	"Swarm"	3:40
3.	"About a Plane Crash"	2:48
4.	"Distorted Thought of Addiction"	3:55
5.	"Destruction of a Statue" (live)	3:16
Total length:		16:14

== Personnel ==
Suicide Silence

- Mitch Lucker – vocals
- Rick Ash – lead guitar
- Chris Garza – rhythm guitar
- Mike Bodkins – bass
- Josh Goddard – drums

Production

- Nick "Bygon" Randhawa – recording, mixing
- Nick Barnes – mastering
