= Disengage (song) =

Single by Suicide Silence

from the album No Time to Bleed
- Released: April 20, 2010
- Recorded: 2009
- Genre: Deathcore
- Length: 4:04
- Label: Century Media
- Songwriters: Chris Garza, Mark Heylmun, Alex Lopez, Mitch Lucker
- Producer: Machine

Suicide Silence singles chronology
| "Wake Up" (2009) | "Disengage" (2010) | "No Time to Bleed" (2011) |

"Disengage" is a song by American deathcore band Suicide Silence. The song was released as the second single from their second album, No Time to Bleed on April 20, 2010.

== Background ==
Suicide Silence started and announced the production for a music video for "Disengage" on February 19, 2010, this announcement eventually lead to the releasing of the song as a single before the video's premier. The single is released in two formats, as a blue 7" vinyl and as a digital download. The artwork for the single was designed by Joshua Belanger.

It includes the album version of "Disengage" and a remix of the song entitled "Disengage (Big Chocolate Remix)" which was handled by Cameron "Big Chocolate" Argon.

== Video ==
The music video for "Disengage" was recorded in Los Angeles, California and was directed by Thomas Mignone. It was originally announced that it would be released sometime in May 2010, but was not released until June with its online premiere appearing on Music Choice. The video features Suicide Silence performing in front on a blank, white background.

== Track listing ==
1. "Disengage" - 4:04
2. "Disengage (Big Chocolate Remix)" - 3:38

== Personnel ==
Suicide Silence

- Mitch Lucker – vocals
- Mark Heylmun – lead guitar, bass guitar
- Chris Garza – rhythm guitar
- Alex Lopez – drums

Production

- Produced by Machine
- Artwork by Joshua Belanger
- Music video directed by Thomas Mignone
