= You Can't Stop Me (album) =

Studio album by Suicide Silence
- Released: July 14, 2014
- Recorded: 2013
- Genre: Deathcore
- Length: 39:57
- Label: Nuclear Blast
- Producer: Steve Evetts

Suicide Silence chronology
Ending Is the Beginning: The Mitch Lucker Memorial Show (2014)	You Can't Stop Me (2014)	Suicide Silence (2017)

Singles from You Can't Stop Me
- 1. "Cease to Exist" Released: May 6, 2014; 2. "Don't Die" Released: June 10, 2014

Professional ratings
Review scores
Source	Rating
About.com	3/5 stars
AllMusic	3.5/5 stars
Laut.de	3/5 stars
Loudwire	Highly positive
Metal Hammer Germany	6/7
Metal Hammer UK	4.5/5 stars
Powermetal.de	7.5/10
Rock Hard	8/10

You Can't Stop Me is the fourth studio album by American deathcore band Suicide Silence. It was released in the UK on July 14, 2014 and in North America on July 15 by Nuclear Blast. It is the first album featuring vocalist Hernan "Eddie" Hermida, and the first album without original lead vocalist Mitch Lucker, who died in 2012.

== Album title ==
The album title and title track come from a set of lyrics that Mitch Lucker wrote before he died. The song's music video was released on July 1, 2014.

== Singles ==
On May 6, 2014, the song "Cease to Exist" was released as the first single from the album, and was made available for purchase on iTunes. The lyric video to "Cease to Exist" was released on Nuclear Blast's YouTube channel the same day. The second single from the album, "Don't Die", was released on June 12, 2014.

== Commercial performance ==
You Can't Stop Me produced the bands most successful first week sales, selling 15,000 copies in its first week and debuting at number 16 on the Billboard 200 their highest placement to date. It also became their highest charting album in several other countries including Australia, Austria and Germany. It also became the bands first number 1 chart placement on the UK Independent Album Breaker chart.

== Critical reception ==
Tom Jurek of AllMusic praised vocalist Hernan "Eddie" Hermida "Alternating between shrieks and guttural low growls, he leads the band in highlights that include the careening "Inherit the Crown," the speed test of "Cease to Exist," the irresistible staccato hook in "Warrior," the blinding blitzkrieg that is "Ending Is the Beginning," the anthemic "Sacred Words," and the punishing "Control." Loudwire praised the bands improved songwriting stating "They add a little more variety to the proceedings than on past albums, such as the intro to ‘Sacred Words’ and the album closer ‘Ouroboros.’ ‘You Can’t Stop Me’ is an album that is a fitting tribute to Lucker, and serves notice that the band is taking the album title literally as they keep moving forward." Terry Bezer of Metal Hammer UK added "Not only is it a beautiful thing that Suicide Silence have continued as a band, that You Can’t Stop Me is as good as it is marks one of the greatest comeback stories you’ll find in metal. A band that were on the verge of something special have not only delivered it, they’ve done so in the most adverse of conditions. This is an essential listen for any self-respecting metalhead."

== Track listing ==
All lyrics are written by Hernan "Eddie" Hermida, except "You Can't Stop Me" and "Ending Is the Beginning" by Mitch Lucker; all music is composed by Suicide Silence.

No.	Title	Length
1.	"M.A.L." (instrumental)	0:47
2.	"Inherit the Crown"	3:28
3.	"Cease to Exist"	3:42
4.	"Sacred Words"	4:20
5.	"Control" (featuring George "Corpsegrinder" Fisher)	2:53
6.	"Warrior"	3:00
7.	"You Can't Stop Me" (lyrics written by Mitch Lucker)	4:07
8.	"Monster Within" (featuring Greg Puciato)	3:37
9.	"We Have All Had Enough"	3:36
10.	"Ending Is the Beginning" (re-recorded from Suicide Silence EP)	2:38
11.	"Don't Die"	3:45
12.	"Ouroboros" (contains bonus hidden track "Dogma: I Am God" on limited copies of the album)	4:04

Special edition bonus tracks
No.	Title	Length
13.	"Blue Haze"	3:31
14.	"Last Breath" (Hatebreed cover)	1:34

Notes

- 2000 copies of the album (1000 standard and 1000 deluxe) contained the hidden track "Dogma: I Am God", which starts at 4:20 of "Ouroboros".

== Personnel ==
Suicide Silence

- Hernan "Eddie" Hermida – vocals
- Chris Garza – rhythm guitar
- Mark Heylmun – lead guitar
- Dan Kenny – bass
- Alex Lopez – drums

Additional personnel

- George "Corpsegrinder" Fisher – additional vocals on "Control"
- Greg Puciato – additional vocals on "Monster Within"
- Steve Evetts – production

== Charts ==
Chart (2014)	Peak position
Australian Charts (ARIA)	30
Austrian Albums (Ö3 Austria)	43
Belgian Albums (Ultratop Flanders)	136
Belgian Albums (Ultratop Wallonia)	135
Canadian Albums (Billboard)	30
German Albums (Offizielle Top 100)	24
Swiss Albums (Schweizer Hitparade)	54
UK Albums (Official Charts)	84
UK Rock & Metal Albums (Official Charts)	4
UK Physical Albums (Official Charts)	81
UK Independent Albums (Official Charts)	9
UK Independent Album Breakers (Official Charts)	1
Billboard 200	16
US Independent Albums (Billboard)	2
US Top Rock Albums (Billboard)	4
US Top Hard Rock Albums (Billboard)	2
