= Suicide Silence =

American deathcore band

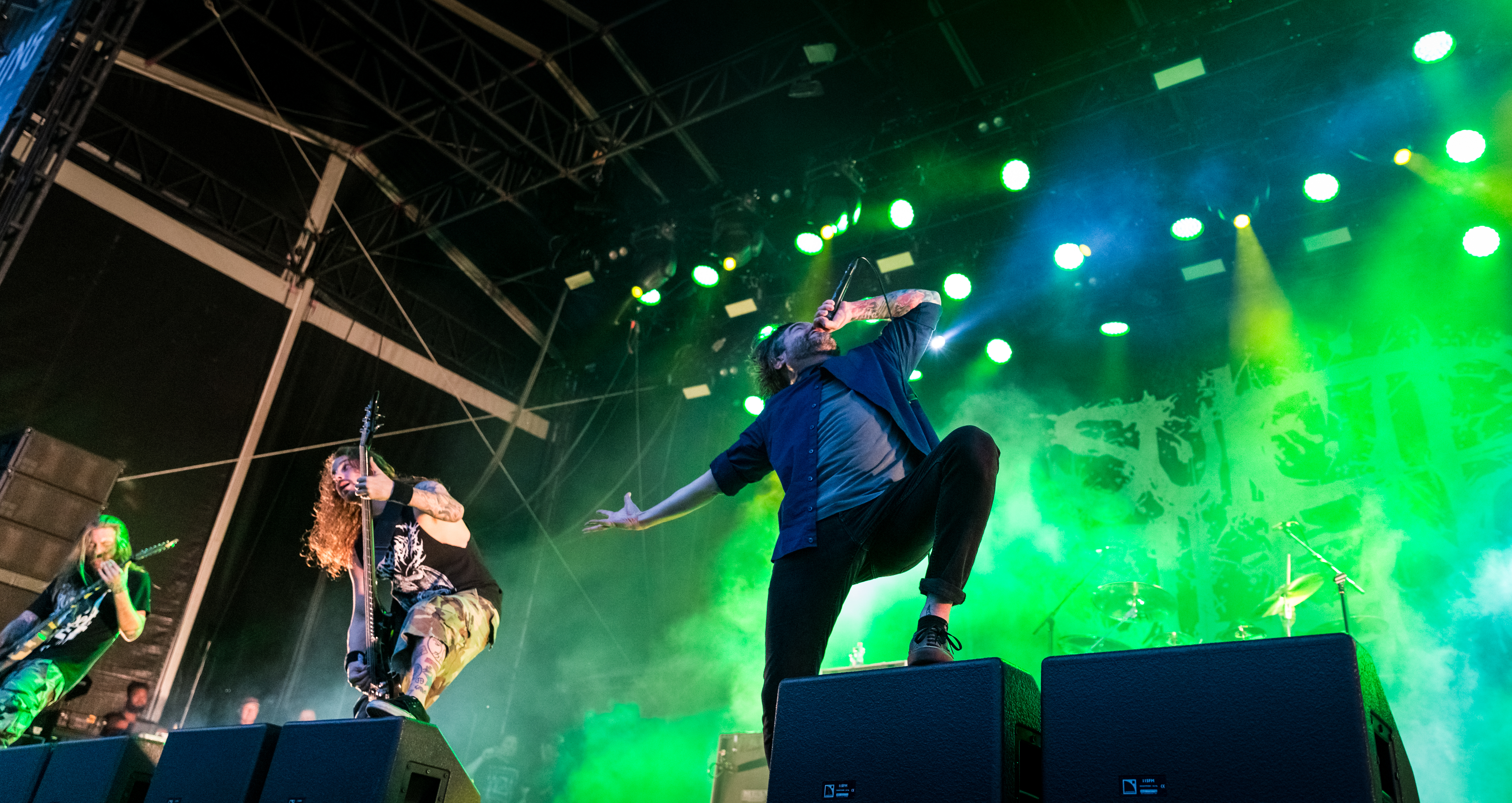
- Suicide Silence performing in 2017

Background information
- Origin: Riverside, California, U.S.
- Genre: Deathcore
- Works: Suicide Silence discography
- Years active: 2002–present
- Labels: Nuclear Blast; Century Media
- Members: Chris Garza; Mark Heylmun; Dan Kenny; Eddie Hermida; Ernie Iniguez
- Past members: Tanner Womack; Chris Grucelski; Justin Tufano; Mike Olheiser; Josh Tufano; Rick Ash; Josh Goddard; Mike Bodkins; Mitch Lucker; Alex Lopez
- Website: suicidesilence.net

Suicide Silence is an American deathcore band from Riverside, California. The band was established in 2002, and has released seven studio albums, three EPs, and nineteen music videos. They were awarded the Revolver Golden God award for "Best New Talent" in 2009. The group currently consists of guitarists Chris Garza and Mark Heylmun, bassist Dan Kenny, vocalist Hernan "Eddie" Hermida and drummer Ernie Iniguez.

Loudwire designated Suicide Silence as being among deathcore's "Big Four", along with Whitechapel, Thy Art Is Murder and Job for a Cowboy.

== History ==
=== Formation, demos and self-titled debut EP (2002–2006) ===
Suicide Silence was founded in 2002 in Riverside, California. At the time, it was a side project made up of musicians from other bands. Their first release was the Death Awaits demo in 2003, with Tanner Womack on vocals, Chris Garza and Josh Tufano on guitars, Chris Grucelski on bass and Justin Tufano on drums. After Death Awaits was completed, Mitch Lucker—who at the time played in a band called Dying Dreams alongside Josh Tufano—joined Suicide Silence as a co-vocalist. He was invited by Womack after performing guest vocals at the band's first performance in April 2003. The band only performed one show with two vocalists before firing Womack, which left all vocal duties solely to Lucker. After replacing Justin Tufano with Josh Goddard on drums and Chris Grucelski with Mike Olheiser on bass, the band recorded and released a second demo in 2004.

It was by this time that the band members began committing more time to Suicide Silence, joining forces with guitarist Rick Ash and bassist Mike Bodkins, replacing Josh Tufano and Mike Olheiser, respectively. Both musicians had previously played in Torn Within and shared the stage with Suicide Silence at local shows throughout 2004. They recorded a demo that became known as the "Family Guy Demo" due to its heavy use of samples from the show, and released it digitally through MySpace and their website. The song "Bludgeoned to Death" off of this demo would later see release on the band's first album. Afterwards, the band began working on their first release backed by a small independent label; a self-titled EP which was released in September 2005 by Third Degree Records and saw a re-release in the UK through In at the Deep End Records in 2006. Shortly after the EP's recording, Ash left Suicide Silence due to school commitments and was replaced by Mark Heylmun, who remains as lead guitarist to this day. Suicide Silence toured heavily in support of the EP, booking all shows themselves and playing with bands such as All Shall Perish and Light This City. Josh Goddard left the band in May 2006, citing "differences between the band members" as the reason for leaving; he was replaced by Alex Lopez (ex-guitarist for Blackheart Eulogy and The Funeral Pyre). Suicide Silence embarked on their first overseas tour in October, supporting Abigail Williams on their UK tour.

=== The Cleansing (2006–2008) ===
With a new solidified and dedicated lineup, Suicide Silence recorded six pre-production songs while in the process of signing with Century Media Records in 2006, it led to their then upcoming full-length album debut: The Cleansing. The album was written and recorded between March and April 2007 in Los Angeles, with engineer John Travis and producer Tue Madsen, who also mixed the album. The album also features artwork by Dave McKean. The Cleansing saw its release on September 18, 2007, and debuted at number 94 on the Billboard 200, selling 7,250 copies in its first week of release. The sales of that week ending combined with its later sales made The Cleansing one of the best-selling debut albums in Century Media history. With the success of their debut album, Suicide Silence were included to take part in Mayhem Festival that took place during the summer of 2008. Afterward, they toured Europe with Parkway Drive and Bury Your Dead, following a successful US tour with the same bands. Suicide Silence then followed along with a tour in Australia with Parkway Drive, A Day to Remember and The Acacia Strain in mid-2008 during the time when they were included to perform at Sweat Fest. At this point, Suicide Silence was beginning to gain a wide range of fans throughout the world. While returning home from the continuous tours, the band covered the song "Engine No. 9" by Deftones, and released the cover on their limited edition Green Monster single as well as the iTunes Store all during the same year.

=== No Time to Bleed (2008–2010) ===
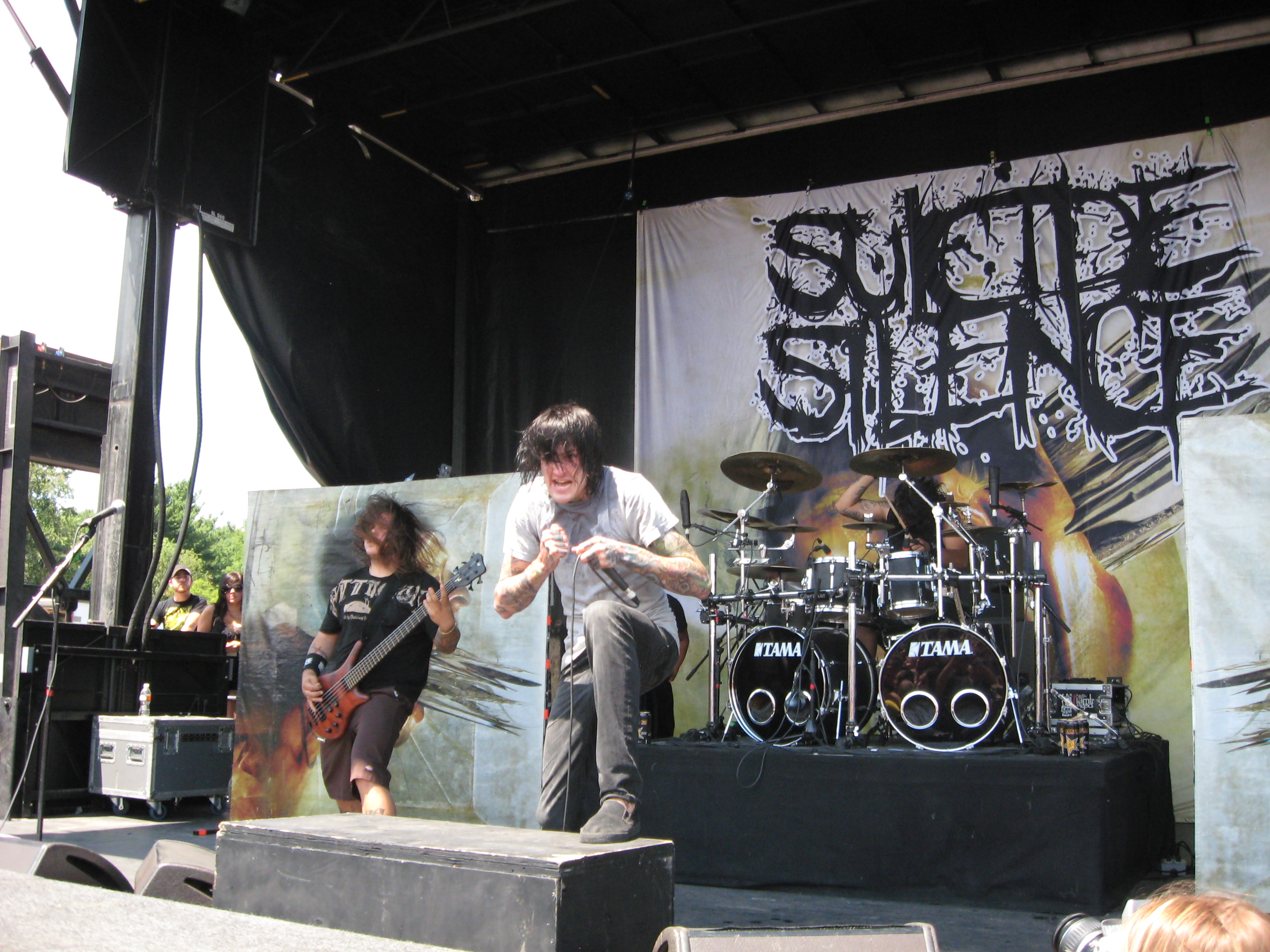
Suicide Silence have been noted for their highly incessant touring, especially during the The Cleansing and No Time to Bleed eras.

Shortly before embarking on Mayhem Festival in mid-2008, Suicide Silence's MySpace profile title read "Suicide Silence (Is writing a new album)", which was the first indication of ensuring the upcoming of their second album. On June 26, 2008, Mitch Lucker appeared on the Headbangers Ball blog podcast. In the interview, Lucker stated that the album would be recorded through tracks as opposed of being recorded live, such as The Cleansing. He also said the new album would "blow The Cleansing away." Machine was chosen by the band to be the producer of the album. The title for it was revealed as being No Time to Bleed. In late 2008, the band parted ways with longtime bassist Mike Bodkins. They were joined by Dan Kenny of Animosity in time for an Australia tour in December 2008. In April 2009, Kenny was introduced as the band's new permanent bassist.

Suicide Silence began recording No Time to Bleed in February 2009 with production by acclaimed producer Machine and engineering by Will Putney. During Music as a Weapon as well as the band's Cleansing the Nation tour, they began to perform the songs "No Time to Bleed", "Your Creations", "Lifted" and "Wake Up" months before the release of the album. In April they received the Revolver Golden God award for "Most Innovative Band" and performed at the awards show. Suicide Silence were included on 2009's Pedal to the Metal tour, along with the bands Mudvayne, Static-X, Bury Your Dead, Dope and Black Label Society. During the same year, the group was awarded the Golden God award for "Best New Talent".

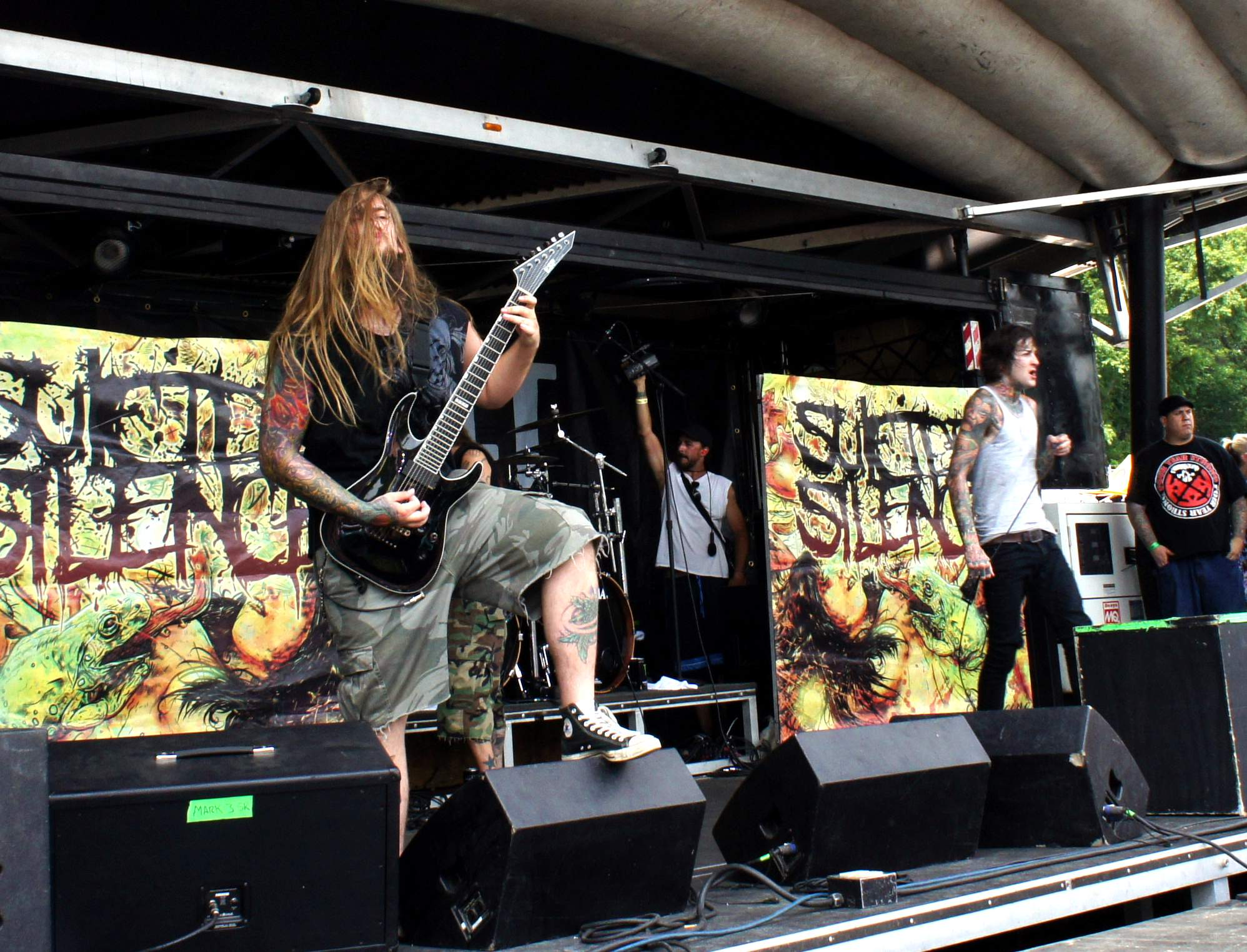
Suicide Silence performing in Maryland during Vans Warped Tour 2010

Suicide Silence released No Time to Bleed on June 30, 2009, through Century Media. The album peaked at No. 32 on the Billboard 200, selling 14,000 copies in the first week in the United States alone. The opening track from the album, "Wake Up" was released as a digital download-only EP, which includes the original song, a live performance of it, and a remix handled by Shawn Crahan of Slipknot. A music video was produced for the song as well and made its debut premiere on Fearnet. "Genocide" was released as the album's second single. Its music video was created in collaboration with Bloody Disgusting and a remix for the song was featured in the Saw VI soundtrack. Suicide Silence announced production for a music video for the song, "Disengage", of which was released as a single on April 20, 2010. The video for it was released during June 2010. The band played throughout the entire Warped Tour 2010 on the Altec Lansing Stage. In October, the group began their first headlining tour in two years with support from MyChildren MyBride, Molotov Solution, The Tony Danza Tapdance Extravaganza and Conducting from the Grave.

=== The Black Crown and Lucker's death (2011–2012) ===
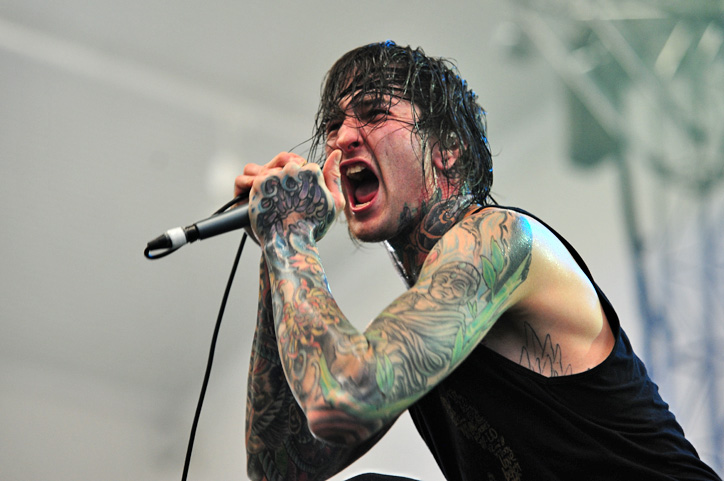
The band's original vocalist, Mitch Lucker, died in late 2012.

By 2011, Suicide Silence began preparing their third full-length album in Big Bear, California, with Steve Evetts as the selected producer. During March, the group performed at California's Metalfest, and a week later, Nevada's Extreme Thing festivals, at both of these performances, the band confirmed that the new album would be titled The Black Crown. Working titles for the album were "Cancerous Skies", "Human Violence" and "Fuck Everything". When asked by Kerrang!, Lucker revealed that the album's lyrical themes would feature more of the personal topics that No Time to Bleed had in-concept rather than the anti-religious theme that The Cleansing held. Lucker explained "I still have the same beliefs and same views, but I'm more open to everything. At this point in my life, I don't see the good in making people hate you for something you say. This record [The Black Crown] is for everybody." The song "Human Violence" premiered on radio station Liquid Metal on May 13, 2011. The Black Crown was released on July 12, 2011, and sold over 14,400 copies in the United States alone during its first week of release, which had it debuting at position number 28 on the Billboard 200 chart.

The group was included on the line-up for the fourth annual Mayhem Festival, again playing on the Extreme Stage with other metal acts including Machine Head, Trivium and All Shall Perish during July and August 2011.

Founding member and vocalist Mitch Lucker died on November 1, 2012, at precisely 6:17 am. It was announced by Orange County Coroners Office that he had suffered severe injuries incurred from a motorcycle accident. One report stated that Lucker crashed his motorcycle shortly after 21:00 on October 31.

On December 21, 2012, a memorial show to benefit Kenadee Lucker's future education costs was held at the Fox Theater in Pomona, California. The show was titled "Ending Is the Beginning: Mitch Lucker Memorial Show" as a reference to both an early song from the band (see Suicide Silence) as well as acknowledging the transitional period for the band following Lucker's death. The show itself featured the members of Suicide Silence performing songs from each of the band's releases with a different guest vocalist performing with the band for each song. In addition to the memorial show, the band started the Kenadee Lucker Education Fund and continues to promote donations towards Mitch's daughter.

=== New vocalist, Ending Is the Beginning and You Can't Stop Me (2013–2014) ===
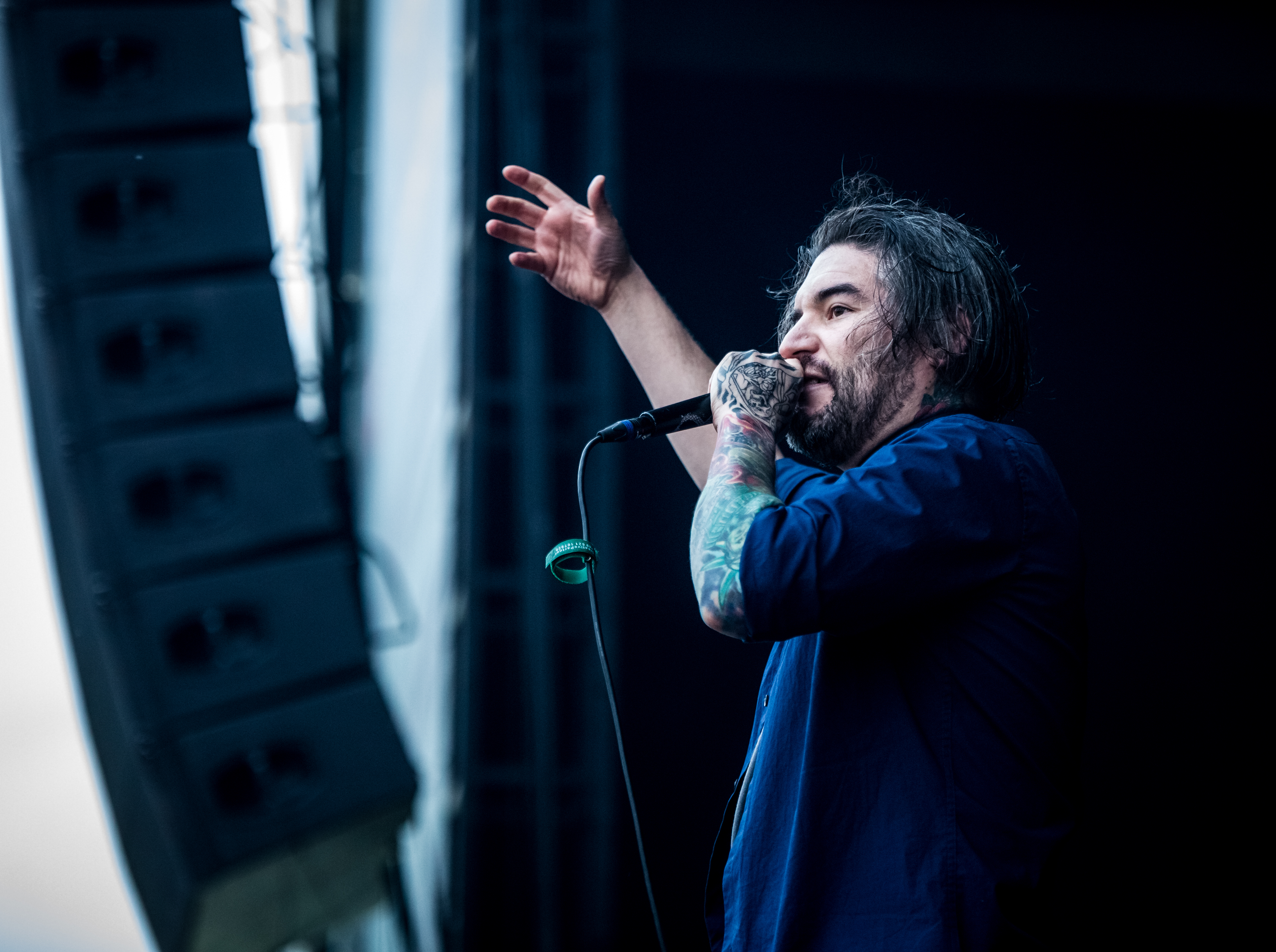
Hermida, best known for fronting All Shall Perish, became the new vocalist of Suicide Silence in 2013.

After nearly a year of inactivity, it was confirmed on October 2, 2013, that Suicide Silence would hire a new vocalist, Hernan "Eddie" Hermida of All Shall Perish. The band released a clip of their song "You Only Live Once" with Hermida on vocals.

On October 23, 2013, the band announced on Facebook that they were writing new material via a picture captioned, "Feels good to be working on new music. More updates coming soon." Subsequently, on October 30, the band announced they would start recording their next album the following week. On November 5, they announced the new album would be released early Summer 2014.

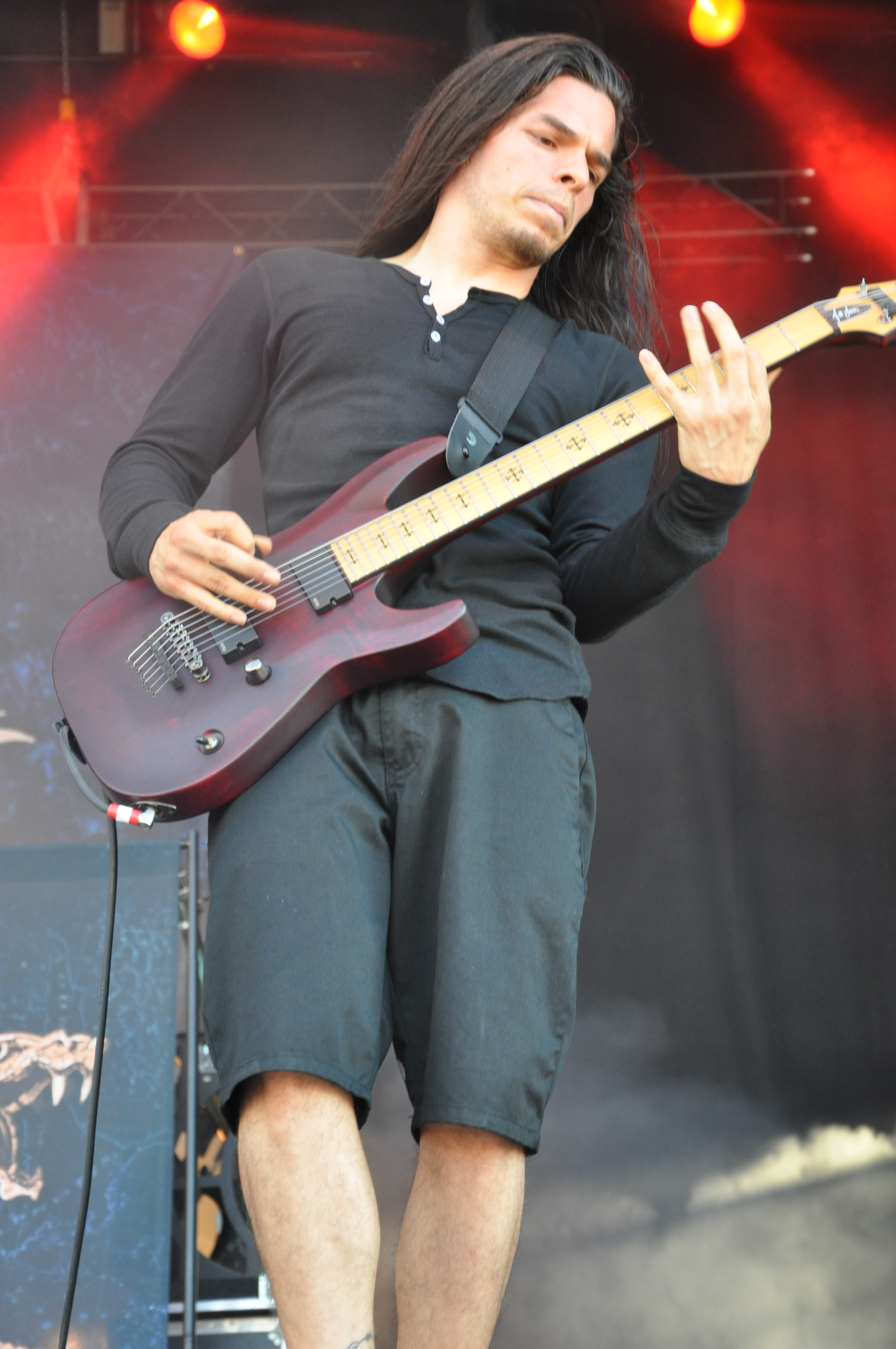
Guitarist Chris Garza at Rock am Ring 2014

On December 16, 2013, the band released a trailer for Ending Is the Beginning: The Mitch Lucker Memorial Show, which was released on CD/DVD/Blu-ray on February 18, 2014. In an interview with Soundwave TV on February 22, 2014, vocalist Eddie Hermida stated that one of the songs on the new album would contain some of Mitch Lucker's final lyrics.

On April 23, 2014, the band announced the title of their upcoming fourth album to be You Can't Stop Me, which was taken from the title of a song that Mitch Lucker had written before his death. The album was released on July 14 in the United Kingdom and July 15 in the United States. On May 2, Suicide Silence announced that a song off their new album, You Can't Stop Me, "Cease to Exist" would be released as the first single off the album. The song was released on May 6, 2014, and performed live for the first time at Rock am Ring 2014 on June 6, 2014.

=== Sacred Words and self-titled fifth album (2015–2019) ===
On October 6, 2015, Suicide Silence announced via their Facebook page they were going to be releasing a new EP on October 23, 2015, titled Sacred Words, featuring the eponymous track from You Can't Stop Me. It featured "Sacred Words" as well as various unreleased tracks, including 3 live tracks taken from a live performance at the Hungarian festival RockPart 2015. The band also stated that they began working on a new album in 2016.

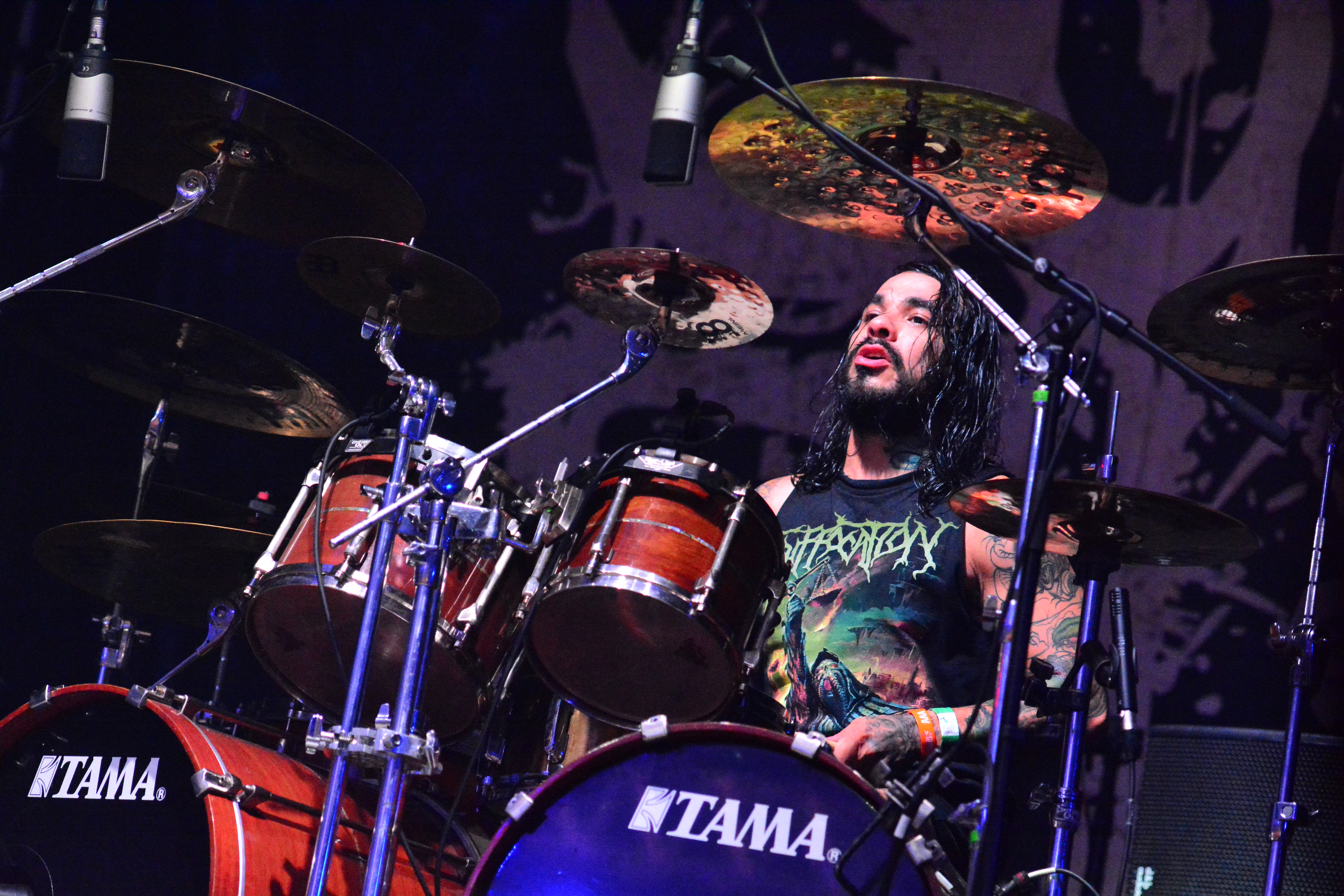
Former drummer Alex Lopez at Wacken Open Air 2015

On December 27, 2016, The band announced that their self-titled album, Suicide Silence, would be released on February 24, 2017, via Nuclear Blast. The first single "Doris", which had been performed live at Knotfest in 2016, was released on January 6, 2017, to scathing criticism from fans due to the perceived drastic stylistic shift. The album became a notable departure from their established deathcore sound, instead pursuing a sound resembling nu metal, heavily influenced by 1990s acts such as Korn and Deftones. The album received mixed reviews from critics. About 4,650 copies were sold in its first week of sales, which was 69% less than the 15,000 first week sales of their previous album You Can't Stop Me.

=== Become the Hunter and Remember... You Must Die (2019–2025) ===
On October 21, 2019, the band announced their sixth studio album will be called Become the Hunter with a release date expected in early 2020. The album artwork and track listing was released through their label Nuclear Blast, and on November 11, the band released the opening, instrumental track "Meltdown" from the record. In all, the album spawned three other singles: "Love Me to Death", "Feel Alive" and "Two Steps". Drummer Lopez was absent from its recording due to entering rehabilitation, so drums on the record were instead performed by Ernie Iniguez as a session contribution.

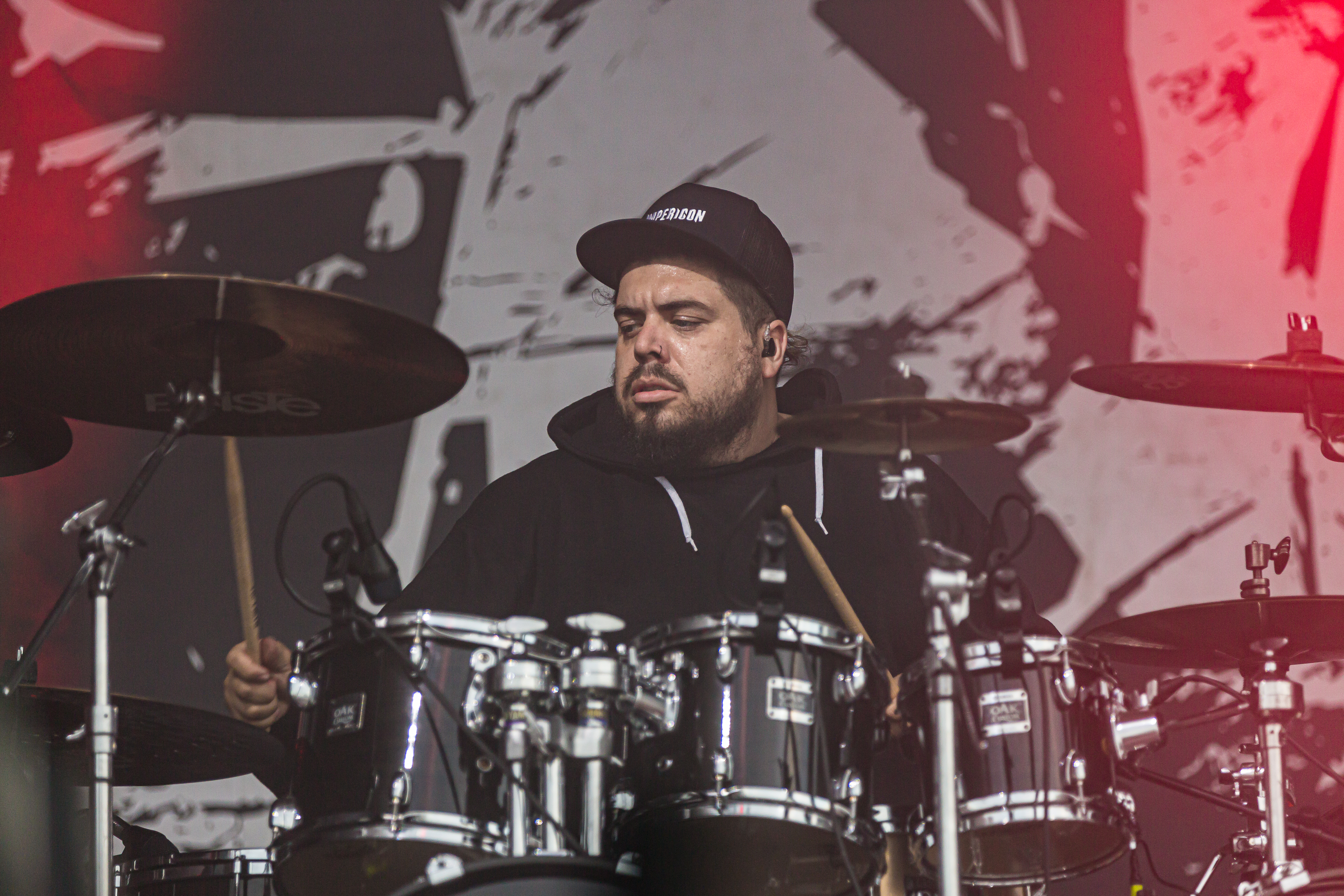
Drummer Ernie Iniguez at Full Force 2022

In early 2022, the band announced their return to Century Media Records, where they released their first three albums. On April 29, Lopez had departed the band. Ernie Iniguez, who had played drums on Become the Hunter, was announced as his live replacement for any upcoming tours. In June 2022, the band announced the title of their seventh studio album, Remember... You Must Die, along with a short audio clip. The album is set for release in early 2023.

On August 31, Suicide Silence released the first single and title track "You Must Die" along with a music video. On October 31, the band premiered the second single "Capable of Violence (N.F.W.)" along with an accompanying music video. On December 9, the band published third single titled "Alter of Self" and revealed the new album would be released on March 10, 2023. On February 8, 2023, one month before the album release, the band unveiled the fourth single "Dying Life" and its corresponding music video. They toured with Dying Fetus in the spring of that year.

On December 8, 2025, Chris Garza announced he was taking a hiatus from the band. A month later, it was announced Ian Waye of Soreption would be his replacement for upcoming live shows.

=== Graceless (2026–present) ===
On July 22, 2026, Chris Garza announced his return to the band.

On September 11, 2026, the band announced their eighth album, Graceless, which will be released on November 20, and also released the title track of the album as the first single.

== Musical style and influences ==
Suicide Silence performs deathcore, which is a fusion between death metal and metalcore. The vocals fluctuate between death growls used in death metal and high-pitched screams used in metalcore, combined with anti-religious lyrics; though, later down the line of their career, they switched to discussing more personal issues. Mathcore elements can be seen in the varied speed changes and complex time signatures in the band's music. The drumming is very fast-paced, grindcore-influenced, and employs a liberal use of double bass drumming and blast beats. The band's 2017 self-titled album was a departure from their usual sound and is credited as a pure nu metal record. However, the band reverted to their deathcore style on its following record Become the Hunter (2020).

The band members themselves have stated that they are influenced from groups such as Meshuggah, Sepultura, Disgorge, Cannibal Corpse, Suffocation, Morbid Angel, Necrophagist, Napalm Death, Nile, Slipknot, Darkest Hour, Deftones, Korn, Death, and Possessed. Some of Suicide Silence's members have been outspoken for their love of nu metal since the band's early days, in a 2022 interview, Garza stated "when [Suicide Silence] first started in 2002, we were very vocal about nü-metal. I wore the Korn shirts and long hair at a hardcore show—which if you didn't know, was a big fucking no-no."

During an interview, Mark Heylmun stated that his biggest influences are Dimebag Darrell and George Lynch. Guitarist and founding member Garza has stated that his biggest inspirations are the brutal death metal bands Wormed, Eternal Suffering and Skinless's early material. For his part, Eddie Hermida called Mr. Bungle singer Mike Patton his biggest inspiration.

== Band members ==
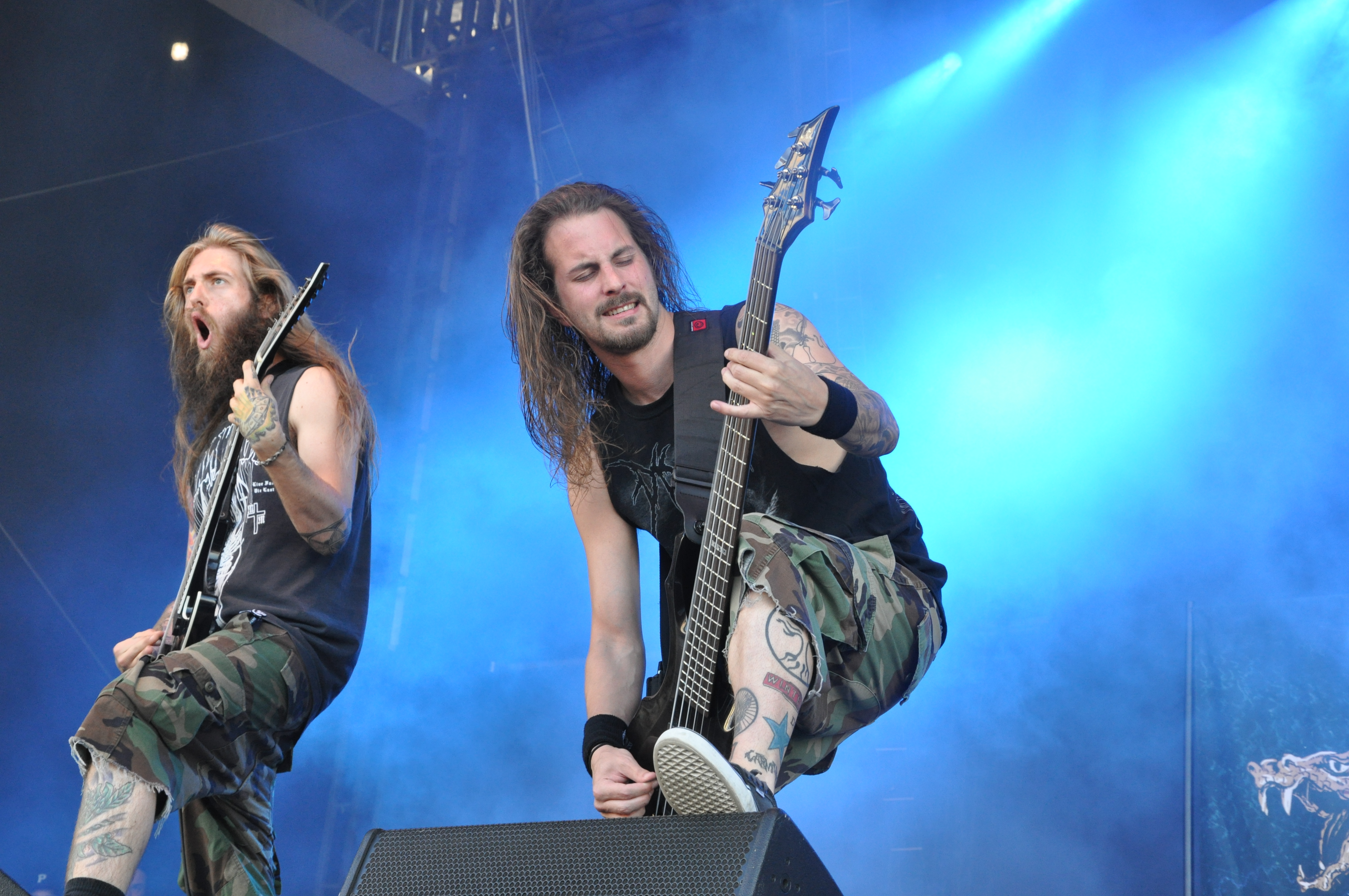
Lead guitarist Mark Heylmun (left) and bassist Dan Kenny.

Current

- Chris Garza – rhythm guitar (2002–present)
- Mark Heylmun – lead guitar (2005–present), bass (2009, studio)
- Dan Kenny – bass (2009–present)
- Hernan "Eddie" Hermida – lead vocals (2013–present)
- Ernie Iniguez – drums (2022–present)

Former

- Tanner Womack – lead vocals (2002–2003)
- Justin Tufano – drums (2002–2003)
- Chris Grucelski – bass (2002–2003)
- Mike Olheiser – bass (2003–2004)
- Josh Tufano – lead guitar (2002–2004)
- Rick Ash – lead guitar (2004–2005)
- Josh Goddard – drums (2003–2006)
- Mike Bodkins – bass, backing vocals (2004–2008)
- Mitch Lucker – lead vocals (2003–2012; his death)
- Alex Lopez – drums (2006–2022)

Touring

- Mike "Lonestar" Carrigan – lead guitar (2018–2019)
- Ian Waye – rhythm guitar (2026)
- Jordan Lockrey – lead guitar (2026)

Timeline

== Discography ==
Studio albums

- The Cleansing (2007)
- No Time to Bleed (2009)
- The Black Crown (2011)
- You Can't Stop Me (2014)
- Suicide Silence (2017)
- Become the Hunter (2020)
- Remember... You Must Die (2023)
- Graceless (2026)
