= Mitch Lucker =

American singer (1984–2012)

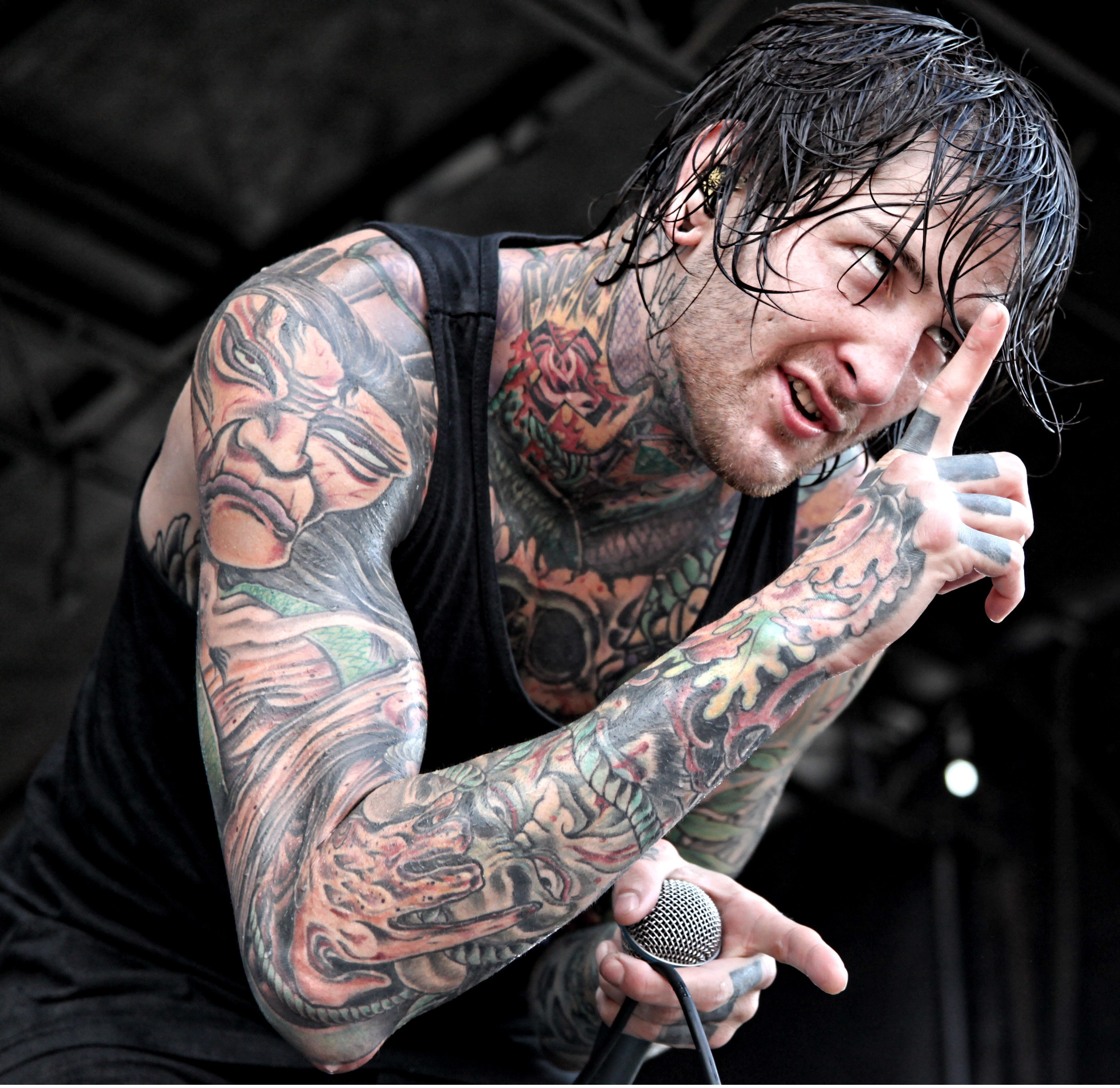
- Lucker performing with Suicide Silence in 2011

Background information
- Born: Mitchell Adam Lucker; October 20, 1984; Riverside, California, U.S.
- Died: November 1, 2012 (aged 28) Huntington Beach, California, U.S.
- Genre: Deathcore
- Occupations: Singer; songwriter
- Years active: 2000–2012
- Labels: Nuclear Blast; Century Media
- Formerly of: Suicide Silence

Mitchell Adam Lucker (October 20, 1984 – November 1, 2012) was an American musician best known as the lead vocalist for the deathcore band Suicide Silence.

== Personal life ==
Mitchell Lucker was born in Riverside, California, to his mother who was a doctor, and father who worked as a prison guard, whom divorced during his youth. Lucker was diagnosed with obsessive-compulsive disorder, and developed a phobia of germs at an early age; Lucker would often fist bump fans instead of shaking their hands due to this. He once stated in an interview with Revolver Magazine "I knew something was up when I started spending all day long in my room making sure all my fucking G.I. Joes were standing in my cabinet." Lucker was first introduced to heavy metal by his father who bought him and his brother Cliff a Sepultura cassette, and took them to Metallica and Black Sabbath concerts.

During his high school years Lucker described himself as a "troublemaker." He and his friends would regularly buy used cars and crash them. On one occasion Lucker got seriously injured during a crash which caused him to spend time in the hospital with an inflated chest cavity and aching ribs. He continued to crash cars until he was 18 years old when he finally stopped after he was arrested for stealing a golf cart, realizing he could receive serious jail time now that he was no longer a minor.

Lucker married his wife Jolie Carmadella on May 8, 2010; the couple had one daughter, Kennadee, together.

== Career ==
Lucker didn’t begin singing until he was 16 when his brother, who played guitar, invited him to sing a Hatebreed song he was playing with some friends. This led to him performing music in 2000 with the band Breakaway, which would later become the local Corona metalcore band Dying Dreams. Dying Dreams featured Lucker on vocals and his brother Cliff on guitar, along with later Suicide Silence bandmates Josh Tufano, also on guitar, and Mike Olheiser on bass. Around a year before Dying Dreams broke up, Mitch Lucker was inducted into Suicide Silence when the band was still deemed a side-project. Originally, the band had two vocalists, with Lucker singing alongside Tanner Womack. However, Womack was eventually dismissed, leading to Lucker becoming the sole vocalist.

Suicide Silence's debut album, The Cleansing, sold 7,250 copies in its first week. Their second album, No Time to Bleed, was released in June 2009. The band's last album to feature Lucker, The Black Crown, was released in July 2011. When asked by Kerrang!, Lucker explained, "I'm not trying to put people's beliefs down – it's about me and my life. This is my head cracked open and poured on the paper! I still have the same beliefs and same views, but I'm more open to everything. At this point in my life, I don't see the good in making people hate you for something you say. This record is for everybody."

== Influences ==
In an interview with The AU Interview, he said the bands that influenced him into starting a band were "Korn, Deftones, Slayer, Slipknot, Sepultura, Pantera, Black Sabbath, Dio, Nirvana, Van Halen, Cannibal Corpse, Death... everything that my dad would buy and bring home to me and my brother saying 'Hey, listen to this.'"

== Tattoos ==
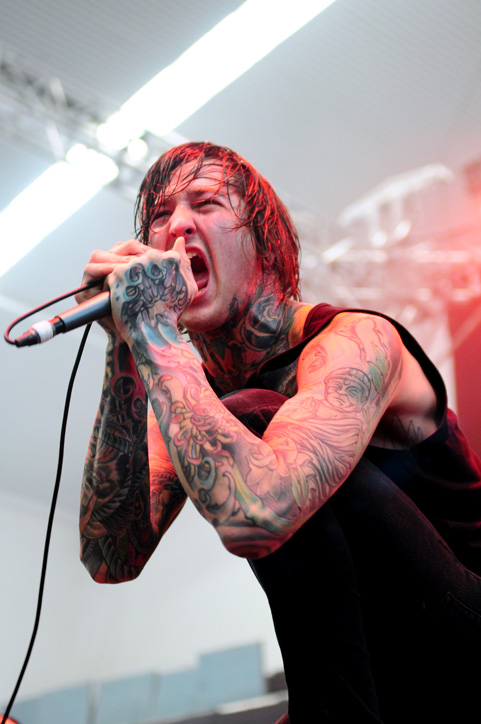
Lucker performing with Suicide Silence in 2010

Lucker was known for his extensive collection of tattoos which covered his arms, torso, neck, hands, fingers, and face. The only place he refused to get tattooed was his back: "I like seeing the artwork because it is artwork! [Having my back tattooed would] be like owning an expensive painting that you can never see. Like, 'Oh, I have this beautiful, expensive painting, but you can't see it because it's at my uncle's house.'"

== Accident and death ==
On October 31, 2012, Lucker was reportedly riding on his 2013 Harley Davidson on Main Street in Huntington Beach when he lost consciousness and struck a light pole. Lucker was flung from his motorcycle and sustained serious injuries. He was taken to UCI Medical Center where doctors performed surgery on him for 8 hours.

On November 1, 2012, Lucker was pronounced dead at 6:17 AM. Local police stated that he died as the result of a motorcycle accident. He was likely under the influence of alcohol at the time of the crash. That night, his wife, friends, and family held a candlelight vigil in memory of him at the crash site.

His funeral took place on November 8, 2012. He was buried at Harbor Lawn-Mount Olive Memorial Park in Costa Mesa, California.

One month following his death, Lucker's bandmates held a memorial show titled "Ending Is the Beginning", which took place at the Fox Theater in Pomona, California. Proceeds from the show served to benefit his daughter's education costs. The band also started the Kenadee Lucker Education Fund and continues to promote donations to her.

== Discography ==
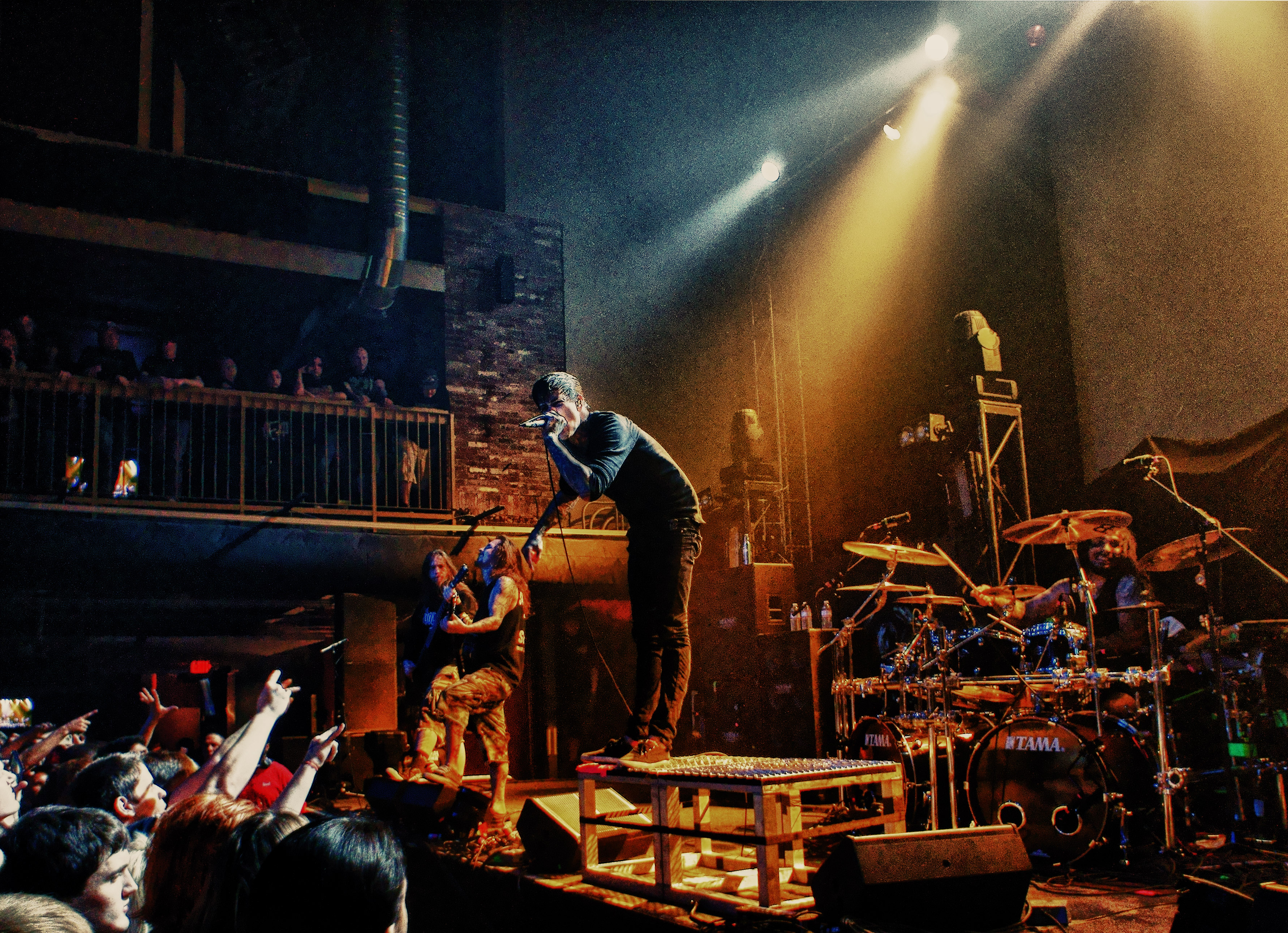
Lucker with Suicide Silence, 2012

With Suicide Silence

- Suicide Silence (2005)
- The Cleansing (2007)
- No Time to Bleed (2009)
- The Black Crown (2011)
- You Can't Stop Me (2014) (writing credits on two tracks)

With Dying Dreams

- Demo (2003)

With Commissioner

- What Is? (2011)

=== Collaborations ===
| Year | Song | Album | Artist |
|---|---|---|---|
| 2006 | "Predator; Never Prey" (feat. Mitch Lucker) | The Dead Walk | The Acacia Strain |
| 2009 | "Classic Struggle" (feat. Mitch Lucker) | The Great Stone War | Winds of Plague |
| 2011 | "The Sinatra" (feat. Mitch Lucker) | My My Misfire EP | My My Misfire |
| 2012 | "We Are the Many" (feat. Mitch Lucker, Marcus Bischoff & Benny Richter) | I Am Nemesis | Caliban |
| 2012 | "Spit Vitriol" (feat. Mitch Lucker) | The Devil's Messenger | The Devastated |
