= The Cleansing (Suicide Silence album) =

Studio album by Suicide Silence
- Released: September 18, 2007
- Recorded: 2007
- Studios: Recorded at King Size Soundlabs (Los Angeles, California); Produced and mixed at Antfarm Studio (Åbyhøj, Denmark)
- Genre: Deathcore
- Length: 43:58
- Label: Century Media
- Producer: Tue Madsen

Suicide Silence chronology
Suicide Silence (2005)	The Cleansing (2007)	No Time to Bleed (2009)

Singles from The Cleansing
- 1. "Bludgeoned to Death" Released: February 28, 2008

Professional ratings
Review scores
Source	Rating
AllMusic	3/5 stars
Blabbermouth.net	6.5/10 stars
Chronicles of Chaos	7/10 stars

The Cleansing is the debut studio album by American deathcore band Suicide Silence. The album was released on September 18, 2007 through Century Media Records. Upon its release it debuted at #94 on the Billboard Top 200, selling 7,250 copies within the first week, and became one of the best-selling debut albums in Century Media's history.

The Cleansing is considered to be an essential release in the deathcore genre.

== Background and recording ==
Suicide Silence began recording The Cleansing during the first half of 2007 with engineer John Travis at King Size Soundlabs in Los Angeles. The album was produced and mixed by Danish producer Tue Madsen. The album was tracked live as opposed to being recorded track-by-track.

== Release history ==
On June 22, 2007, the complete track listing was confirmed online and the songs "Bludgeoned to Death" and "Unanswered" were released by the band via streaming media for promotion prior to the album's release.

The Cleansing was released on September 18, 2007 and debuted at #94 on the Billboard Top 200, selling 7,250 copies in the first week, and became one of the best-selling debut albums in Century Media history. The record was also released on vinyl format, with a limited pressing of 2,000 copies. Music videos have been released for the songs "Unanswered", "The Price of Beauty" and "Bludgeoned to Death". The music video for "The Price of Beauty" was banned from the MTV playlist for being deemed too "visually and lyrically explicit" due to the video's gore imagery.

After returning to their original label Century Media Records, the band announced that will be re-releasing the album on June 24, 2022. It will included new liner notes from the band as well as extensive bonus material.

== Music ==
The music on The Cleansing is considered to be extremely abrasive. In the book Death Metal, music journalist T Coles said the album "sounds like getting beaten up whilst soaking in bleach". AllMusic stated that "there is nothing even remotely melodic or nuanced about" the music on the album. The site said that stylistically, the album is "a toxic mixture" of death metal, grindcore, math metal, black metal, and metalcore. The music is angular with frequent tempo changes and breakdowns. Late vocalist Mitch Lucker layered death growls over black metal shrieks, which AllMusic said "makes it sound like a vocal duet." His vocals on the album have been described as "painfully brutal."

The opening track, "Revelations (Intro)" includes a sound sample from the film Freddy vs. Jason. The hidden track, "Destruction of a Statue" features guest vocals by Nate Johnson, former vocalist of the bands Through the Eyes of the Dead, Deadwater Drowning and Fit for an Autopsy.

== Artwork ==
The album cover artwork was designed by graphic artist Dave McKean.

== Music videos ==
The videos were released for the songs "Unanswered", "The Price of Beauty", "Bludgeoned to Death", “No Pity for a Coward”, "Destruction of a Statue", and "Swarm".

== Reception and legacy ==
AllMusic gave the album three stars out of five, and wrote: "Whether this Southern California band is playing at breakneck speed or going for a breakdown, The Cleansing is downright exhausting -- which, of course, is exactly what Suicide Silence is going for. A perfect example of sensory assault for the sake of sensory assault, The Cleansing is certainly not for everyone; music this abrasive is definitely an acquired taste. But moshers who do appreciate the noisy-for-the-sake-of-noisy approach will find it to be a competent example of metal carried to a ridiculously harsh extreme."

The Cleansing is considered to be an essential release in the deathcore genre. In 2021, Joe Smith-Engelhardt of Alternative Press included the album in his list of "30 deathcore albums from the 2000s that define the genre". In 2021, Eli Enis of Revolver included the album in their list of "15 Essential Deathcore Albums", where they said: "It really doesn’t get much better than this." Loudwire cited it as the best Suicide Silence album, and stated it "had edgy scene kids in a stranglehold" when it was released.

== Track listing ==
All lyrics are written by Mitch Lucker; all music is composed by Suicide Silence.

No.	Title	Length
1.	"Revelations (Intro)"	0:33
2.	"Unanswered"	2:15
3.	"Hands of a Killer"	4:14
4.	"The Price of Beauty"	2:46
5.	"The Fallen"	4:07
6.	"No Pity for a Coward"	3:12
7.	"The Disease"	4:22
8.	"Bludgeoned to Death" (titled "Bludgeoned" in its edited version)	2:34
9.	"Girl of Glass"	2:52
10.	"In a Photograph"	4:32
11.	"Eyes Sewn Shut"	2:58
12.	"Green Monster"	5:49
13.	"Destruction of a Statue" (hidden track)	3:44
Total length:		43:58

UK exclusive edition bonus track
No.	Title	Length
14.	"A Dead Current"	3:38
Total length:		47:36

Ultimate Edition bonus tracks
No.	Title	Length
14.	"A Dead Current"	3:38
15.	"Swarm" (Re-recorded song from the Suicide Silence EP)	3:50
16.	"Engine No. 9" (Deftones cover)	3:25
17.	"Unanswered" (Live in Paris)	2:36
18.	"Bludgeoned to Death" (Live in Paris)	2:57
19.	"The Price of Beauty" (Live in Paris)	3:23
20.	"Swarm" (Live in Paris)	2:16
21.	"No Pity for a Coward" (Live in Paris)	3:12
22.	"Green Monster" (Live in Paris)	3:38
23.	"The Fallen" (Live in Paris)	2:54
24.	"Destruction of a Statue" (Live in Paris)	4:09
25.	"Hands of a Killer" (Instrumental Rehearsal Tapes)	2:03
26.	"In a Photograph" (Instrumental Rehearsal Tapes)	3:52
27.	"The Fallen" (Instrumental Rehearsal Tapes)	3:34
28.	"Untitled" (Instrumental Rehearsal Tapes)	3:03

- Note: Except for "Swarm" and "The Fallen", all live tracks were previously released in 2009 on the Hot Topic Exclusive Edition of No Time to Bleed.

== Personnel ==
Suicide Silence

- Mitch Lucker – vocals
- Mark Heylmun – lead guitar
- Chris Garza – rhythm guitar
- Mike Bodkins – bass
- Alex Lopez – drums

Additional personnel

- Nate Johnson – vocals in "Destruction of a Statue"

Production and other stuff

- Recorded and engineered by John Travis at King Size Soundlabs, Los Angeles, CA
- Sub-engineering by Richard Robinson
- Produced, mixed and mastered by Tue Madsen at Antfarm Studio, Denmark
- Art illustration and design by Dave McKean

== Charts ==
Chart	Peak position
US Billboard 200	94
US Top Hard Rock Albums (Billboard)	13
