= The Black Crown =

Studio album by Suicide Silence
- Released: July 12, 2011
- Recorded: 2011 at The Omen Room Studios, Garden Grove, California
- Genres: Deathcore; nu metal
- Length: 39:24
- Label: Century Media
- Producer: Steve Evetts

Suicide Silence chronology
No Time to Bleed (2009)	The Black Crown (2011)	Ending Is the Beginning: The Mitch Lucker Memorial Show (2014)

The Black Crown (stylized as THE BLΔCK CRΦWN) is the third studio album by American deathcore band Suicide Silence, which was released July 12, 2011, through Century Media Records. It is the final album to feature vocalist Mitch Lucker, who died on November 1, 2012, as well as the first album to feature bassist Dan Kenny, who joined the band shortly after the recording of the previous album.

With anticipation for their third full-length after the release of No Time to Bleed, Suicide Silence prepared recording for The Black Crown on a course of several months starting from the beginning of 2010 with writing ideas and plans before their arrival to the studio for recording in 2011. The album was produced by Steve Evetts.

== Lyrical themes ==
Vocalist Mitch Lucker revealed that the controversial anti-religious lyrics that were included on Suicide Silence's previous albums would not be included on The Black Crown. When asked by Kerrang!, Lucker revealed that the album's lyrical themes would feature more of the personal topics that No Time to Bleed had in-concept. Lucker explained: "I'm not trying to put people's beliefs down - it's about me and my life. This is my head cracked open and poured on the paper! I still have the same beliefs and same views, but I'm more open to everything," he adds. "At this point in my life, I don't see the good in making people hate you for something you say. This record is for everybody."

== Cover artwork ==
The cover for The Black Crown was designed by Ken "K3N" Adams, who designs the artwork for Lamb of God albums as well as many other artists such as Coheed and Cambria and 88 Fingers Louie. The Black Crown was released in several editions such as the standard CD, vinyl (limited to 1000), deluxe edition box set, Digipak limited edition, hot topic version, and a picture disc.

== Reception ==
Professional ratings
Aggregate scores
Source	Rating
Metacritic	69/100
Review scores
Source	Rating
Allmusic	2.5/5 stars
Metal Underground	3/5 stars
Rock Sound	7/10
Thrash Hits	5/6 stars
Under the Gun	4/10

Garnering positive reviews, The Black Crown was praised by Rock Sound earning a 7 out of 10 rating with a review headline reading "There's no more of that deathcore monotony from Suicide Silence..." and went on further to state "blastbeats and breakneck discordant technicality aren't lacking on the five-piece's third LP, but nor are they over-prescribed. In fact, to the group's merit, there's very little outright and over-used death metal fury, instead it's partially replaced by modern metal ambiguities and churning, lengthy breaks."

Metal Underground stated "What really makes 'The Black Crown' a worthy listen and elevates it above the dime-a-dozen dreck of today's deathcore, though, is the apparent love and respect Suicide Silence has for its two pillars of musical influence: death metal and hardcore. Not metalcore… real hardcore, the tough stuff."

Diminuendo gave much praise to the album, giving the album a rating in amplifier attenuation of 8 out of 11. The held the statement; "Coarse with rapid fret board shred, Suicide Silence does not fail to bewilder fans with mind-blowing disharmony you'll always remember, and pinch harmonics you wish you could forget. The Black Crown demonstrates that deathcore does possess musical merit."

== Track listing ==
All lyrics are written by Mitch Lucker; all music is composed by Suicide Silence.

No.	Title	Length
1.	"Slaves to Substance"	3:28
2.	"O.C.D."	3:19
3.	"Human Violence"	3:48
4.	"You Only Live Once"	3:13
5.	"Fuck Everything"	4:34
6.	"March to the Black Crown"	1:30
7.	"Witness the Addiction" (featuring Jonathan Davis)	5:32
8.	"Cross-Eyed Catastrophe" (featuring Alexia Rodriguez)	3:25
9.	"Smashed" (featuring Frank Mullen)	3:06
10.	"The Only Thing That Sets Us Apart"	4:10
11.	"Cancerous Skies"	3:14
Total length:		39:24

iTunes edition bonus tracks
No.	Title	Length
12.	"Superbeast" (Rob Zombie cover)	3:39

Century Media Exclusive Limited Version
No.	Title	Length
12.	"Revival of Life"	4:07

Japanese edition bonus tracks
No.	Title	Length
12.	"Revival of Life"	4:07
13.	"Slaves to Substance" (Big Chocolate's Dubstep remix)	4:41

== Charts ==
Chart	Peak position
German Albums (Offizielle Top 100)	63
UK Rock & Metal Albums (Official Charts)	15
US Billboard 200	28
US Top Rock Albums (Billboard)	7
US Top Hard Rock Albums (Billboard)	3
US Independent Albums (Billboard)	6

== Personnel ==
Suicide Silence

- Mitch Lucker – vocals
- Mark Heylmun – lead guitar
- Chris Garza – rhythm guitar
- Dan Kenny – bass
- Alex Lopez – drums

Production

- Production and engineering by Steve Evetts
- Mixing and mastering by Chris "Zeuss" Harris at Planet Z Studios, Hadley, Massachusetts
- Additional engineering by Allan Hessler
- Recorded at The Omen Room Studios, Garden Grove, California
- Management by Jerry Clubb for Ricochet Management
- A&R by Steve Joh of Century Media
- Artwork and layout by Ken Adams
- Sound design and programming by Clinton Bradley
