= No Time to Bleed =

Studio album by Suicide Silence
- Released: June 30, 2009
- Recorded: 2008–2009 at the Machine Shop in Hoboken, NJ
- Genre: Deathcore
- Length: 37:45
- Label: Century Media
- Producer: Machine

Suicide Silence chronology
The Cleansing (2007)	No Time to Bleed (2009)	The Black Crown (2011)

Alternative cover
- Cover for the European version of No Time to Bleed.

Singles from No Time to Bleed
- 1. "Wake Up" Released: December 29, 2009; 2. "Disengage" Released: April 20, 2010; 3. "No Time to Bleed" Released: January 15, 2011

No Time to Bleed is the second studio album by American deathcore band Suicide Silence. It was released on June 30, 2009 through Century Media Records. The album was released in five different editions; the standard version, the Exclusive Hot Topic Edition with bonus disc "Live in Paris", the iTunes edition, the vinyl edition, and the Maximum Bloodshed Edition. Upon its release, it debuted at number 32 on the Billboard 200, selling 14,001 copies in the United States alone. It is Suicide Silence's most critically acclaimed album and was re-released as No Time to Bleed: Body Bag Edition on July 1, 2010, little over a year after the record's original pressing.

== Background ==
Suicide Silence began writing for No Time to Bleed during the first half of 2008 and planned the recording and creation of the album later that year. On June 26, 2008, vocalist Mitch Lucker appeared on the MTV Headbangers Ball blog podcast. In the interview, Lucker revealed various information and stated that No Time to Bleed would be tracked as opposed to being recorded live, such as The Cleansing. Also from the interview, he said that it would "blow The Cleansing away" along with mentioning that they selected Machine to be the producer of the album. In late 2008, the band parted ways with longtime bassist Mike Bodkins. They were joined by Dan Kenny of Animosity for an Australia tour in December 2008. Although Kenny is credited for bass on the album, it was actually recorded by guitarist Mark Heylmun. Kenny was introduced as the band's new permanent bassist in April 2009.

On March 13, 2009, Suicide Silence completed tracking for No Time to Bleed. They also uploaded behind-the-scenes videos of the recording being processed on their YouTube channel. On April 20, 2009 the band uploaded the song "Lifted" onto their MySpace profile. Suicide Silence made a surprise appearance at the 11th annual New England Metal and Hardcore Festival and played the song "Wake Up". On June 1, 2009, the band uploaded "Wake Up" song onto their official merchandise page for streaming.

== Release ==
The standard, iTunes, Hot Topic, vinyl and Maximum Bloodshed editions of No Time to Bleed were released on June 30, 2009. Music videos have been created for the songs "Wake Up", "Genocide" and "Disengage". The music video for "Wake Up" was the first released from the album, it made its worldwide premiere through Fearnet on July 27, 2009, and was directed by David Brodski. "Genocide" was released as the album's first single on October 20, 2009 and spawned a music video that was created in collaboration with Bloody Disgusting to which led to its release on November 8, 2009. Prior to its release as a single, a remix for the song was created and featured in the film Saw VI. "Disengage" was released as the album's second single on April 20, 2010. The band made an announcement that a music video was in production for it during April and led to its release in June of that year.

In June, an announcement was made directly from the band that a re-release of the album was expected and would be known as No Time to Bleed: Body Bag Edition. The reissue was released on June 1, 2010. It includes a DVD which features previously unreleased live footage along with promotional videos of the album along with alternate artwork and packaging.

== Lyrics and musical themes ==
In an interview prior to the recording of No Time to Bleed, Lucker stated that the lyrics to the album would be more focused on his personal problems instead of the previous subjects that were mainly about religion and politics on their first album The Cleansing. He also made a reference to this change in the song "Suffer", with the lyrics "A ruthless cleansing has already begun and it's time to move on".

The track "...And Then She Bled" consists of a recreation of a 911 emergency phone call recorded on February 16, 2009. A woman, Charla Nash, was attacked by a domesticated chimpanzee named Travis. It is composed of the scenario broken up into parts with the band members of Suicide Silence performing instrumental music that is appropriate to the situation included in the initial recording.

== Reception ==
Professional ratings
Review scores
Source	Rating
About.com	3/5 stars
Allmusic	4/5 stars
Alternative Press	3/5 stars
Chronicles of Chaos	8/10 stars
Komodo Rock	(7.6/10)
Rock Sound	9/10 stars
Thrash Hits	4.5/6 stars

No Time to Bleed debuted at #32 on the Billboard Top 200, selling 14,000 copies in the U.S. alone shortly after its release.

Critical reception for No Time to Bleed was generally positive. Eduardo Rivadavia of Allmusic gave the album a rating of 4 out of 5 and praised the vocals and musicianship. He directly stated that there is a "surprisingly varied array of guitar riff textures, liable to impress the likes of Dimebag Darrell or Tool's Adam Jones. He followed along with saying "Cap this off with an instinctive nose for songwriting economy (no overlabored epics for this band) and lyrics that, while simplistic and even repetitive, at times (e.g. 'Wake Up' and the title track), are also both refreshingly direct and intelligible."

Jim Burt of Rock Sound gave the album a 9 out of 10 and opened his review by generally focusing on the overall delivery, describing that Suicide Silence have "mixed up the blast beats with super-size helpings of mammoth slow groove and extra brutal beatdowns, a tasty addition to their already formidable arsenal." He then closed his review stating that No Time to Bleed is "a ruthless and unrelenting attack on the senses and a top-class exercise in extreme metal oppression. Spearheading the US new-wave? The sky’s the limit… Phil Freeman of Alternative Press stated that the "thunderous drums" were the "best thing about the album" and even put focus into instrumental track, "...And Then She Bled" stating that it's "a moody instrumental, reminiscent of Slipknot's quieter moments."

== Track listing ==
All lyrics are written by Mitch Lucker; all music is composed by Suicide Silence

Standard edition
No.	Title	Length
1.	"Wake Up"	3:48
2.	"Lifted"	4:08
3.	"Smoke"	3:08
4.	"Something Invisible"	2:57
5.	"No Time to Bleed"	2:22
6.	"Suffer"	3:55
7.	"...And Then She Bled" (instrumental)	3:54
8.	"Wasted"	3:13
9.	"Your Creations"	3:59
10.	"Genocide"	2:17
11.	"Disengage"	4:04
Total length:		37:45

Maximum Bloodshed Edition bonus tracks
No.	Title	Length
12.	"Misleading Milligrams"	4:18

iTunes edition bonus tracks
No.	Title	Length
12.	"Them Bones" (Alice in Chains cover)	2:27

Japanese edition bonus tracks
No.	Title	Length
12.	"Misleading Milligrams"	4:18
13.	"Genocide" (Extended Version)	3:01

Hot Topic Exclusive Edition bonus disc
No.	Title	Length
1.	"Unanswered (Live)"	2:34
2.	"Bludgeoned (Live)"	3:31
3.	"The Price of Beauty (Live)"	4:09
4.	"No Pity for a Coward (Live)"	4:09
5.	"Green Monster (Live)"	4:27
6.	"Destruction of a Statue (Live)"	4:10

Maximum Bloodshed Edition DVD
No.	Title	Length
1.	"NTTB Episode 1"
2.	"NTTB Episode 2"
3.	"NTTB Episode 3"
4.	"NTTB Episode 4"
5.	"Hot Dog Lesson with Alex"

Body Bag Edition DVD
No.	Title	Length
1.	"Lifted (Live From The Galaxy, Santa Ana, CA.)"
2.	"Your Creations (Live From The Galaxy, Santa Ana, CA.)"
3.	"Unanswered (Live From The Galaxy, Santa Ana, CA.)"
4.	"Lifted (The Shockhound Sessions Live)"
5.	"The Price of Beauty (The Shockhound Sessions Live)"
6.	"Wake Up (The Shockhound Sessions Live)"
7.	"No Pity for a Coward (The Shockhound Sessions Live)"
8.	"Wake Up (Live From Fuel TV's Daily Habit)"
9.	"Lifted (Live From Fuel TV's Daily Habit)"
10.	"Wake Up (Music Video)"
11.	"Disengage (Music Video)"
12.	"Genocide (Saw VI Remix) (Music Video)"
13.	"Track by Track"

== Personnel ==
All information is derived from the enclosed booklet. Although Dan Kenny is credited for bass, all bass was performed by Mark Heylmun.

Suicide Silence

- Mitch Lucker – vocals
- Mark Heylmun – lead guitar, bass
- Chris Garza – rhythm guitar
- Alex Lopez – drums

Production

- Production, mixing, engineering and programming by Machine
- Tracking, editing and additional mixing by Will Putney
- Engineering, tracking and editing by Jayson Dezuzio
- Editing and assisting by Adam Schoeller and Bill Purcell
- Recording by David Zamora

== Charts ==
Chart	Peak position
US Billboard 200	32
US Top Rock Albums (Billboard)	12
US Top Hard Rock Albums (Billboard)	6
