= Spiritbox discography =

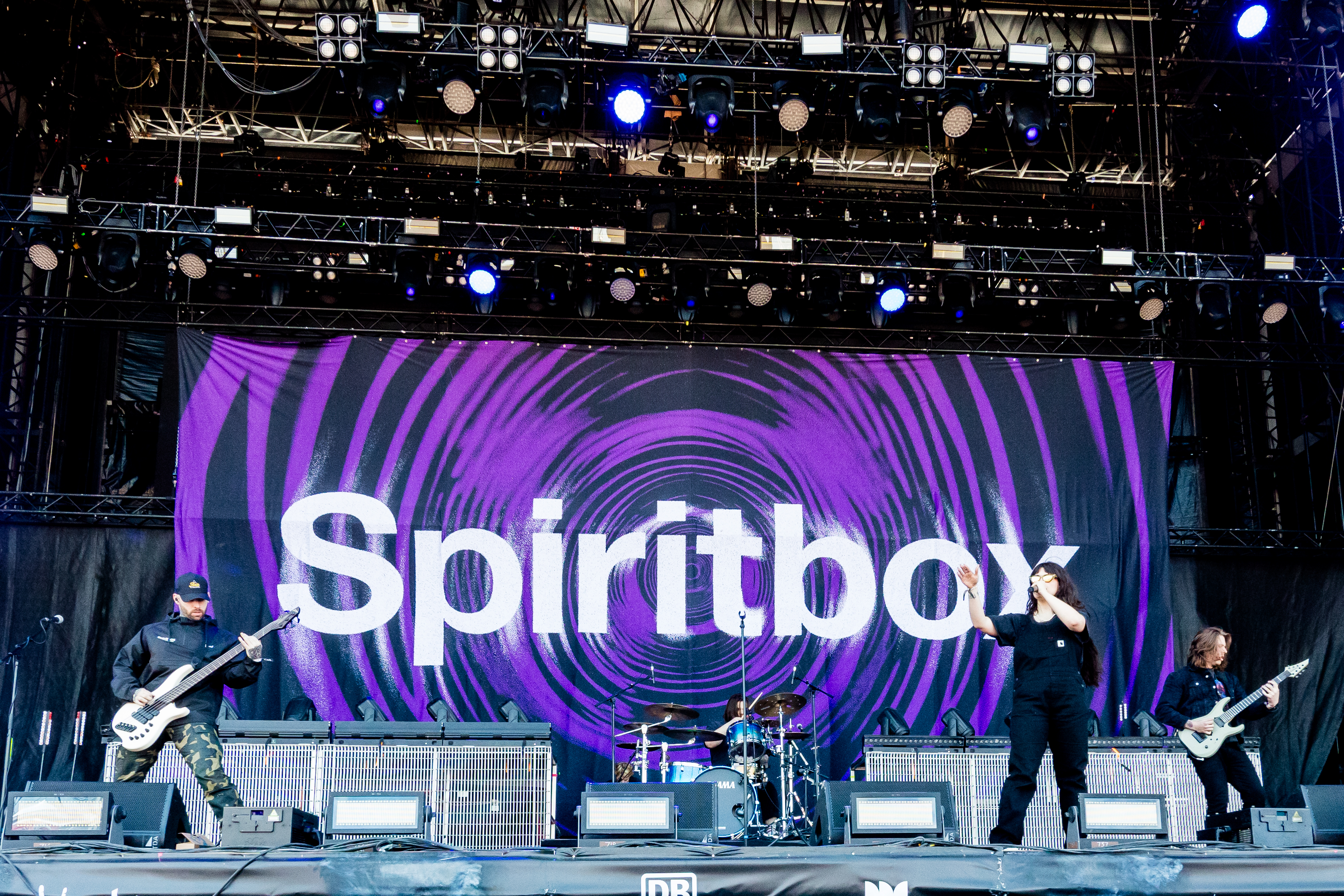
- Spiritbox in 2023
- Studio albums: 2
- EPs: 4
- Singles: 25
- Music videos: 24

Canadian heavy metal band Spiritbox has released two studio albums, four EPs, twenty-five singles (five as a featured artist), and twenty-four music videos.

== Studio albums ==
List of studio albums, with selected chart positions
Title	Album details	Peak chart positions										Sales
Title	Album details	CAN	AUS	BEL (FL)	FIN	GER	SCO	UK	UK Rock	US	US Rock	Sales
Eternal Blue	Released: September 17, 2021; Label: Rise, Pale Chord; Formats: CD, LP, cassette, download	17	8	144	40	17	8	19	2	13	1	UK: 23,998; US: 230,000
Tsunami Sea	Released: March 7, 2025; Label: Rise, Pale Chord; Formats: CD, LP, cassette, download	114	34	80	39	12	8	17	3	26	3	
"—" denotes a release that did not chart or was not issued in that region.

== Extended plays ==
Title	EP details	Peak chart positions
Title	EP details	US
Spiritbox	Released: October 27, 2017; Label: Pale Chord	—
Singles Collection	Released: April 26, 2019; Label: Pale Chord	—
Rotoscope	Released: June 22, 2022; Label: Rise	—
The Fear of Fear	Released: November 3, 2023; Label: Pale Chord, Rise	116
"—" denotes a recording that did not chart.

== Singles ==
List of singles as lead artist, showing year released, certifications and album name
Title	Year	Peak chart positions						Certifications	Album
Title	Year	US Digital Songs	US Hard Rock Digital	US Hot Hard Rock	US Hot Rock & Alt.	US Main. Rock	US Rock Digital	Certifications	Album
"Perennial"	2018	—	—	—	—	—	—		Singles Collection
"Electric Cross"	2018	—	—	—	—	—	—		Singles Collection
"Trust Fall"	2018	—	—	—	—	—	—		Singles Collection
"Belcarra"	2019	—	—	—	—	—	—		Singles Collection
"Bleach Bath"	2019	—	—	—	—	—	—		Singles Collection
"Rule of Nines"	2019	—	—	—	—	—	—		Non-album single
"Blessed Be"	2020	—	—	—	—	—	—		Non-album single
"Holy Roller"	2020	—	—	12	—	—	—		Eternal Blue
"Constance"	2020	—	1	19	—	—	—		Eternal Blue
"Circle with Me"	2021	71	1	5	50	—	12	RIAA: Gold	Eternal Blue
"Secret Garden"	2021	—	—	—	—	34	—		Eternal Blue
"Hurt You"	2021	—	—	20	—	—	—		Eternal Blue
"Rotoscope"	2022	—	7	17	—	—	—		Rotoscope
"The Void"	2023	—	16	24	—	—	—		The Fear of Fear
"Jaded"	2023	—	9	10	—	—	—		The Fear of Fear
"Cellar Door"	2023	—	—	15	—	—	—		The Fear of Fear
"Soft Spine"	2024	—	5	11	—	—	—		Tsunami Sea
"Perfect Soul"	2024	—	—	9	—	14	—		Tsunami Sea
"No Loss, No Love"	2025	—	—	14	—	—	—		Tsunami Sea
"Mourning"	2026	—	—	5	—	18	—		TBA
"—" denotes a recording that did not chart.

=== As featured artist ===
List of singles as featured artist, with showing year released
Title	Year	Peak chart positions				Album
Title	Year	US Hard Rock Digital	US Hot Hard Rock	US Dance/ Elec.	US Hot Rock & Alt.	Album
"Shivering" (Illenium featuring Spiritbox)	2022	16	9	15	—	Illenium
"Cobra" (remix; Megan Thee Stallion featuring Spiritbox)	2023	—	4	—	47	Non-album single
"TYG" (Megan Thee Stallion featuring Spiritbox)	2024	—	5	—	—	Megan: Act II
"My Queen" (Babymetal featuring Spiritbox)	2025	—	—	—	—	Metal Forth
"Under My Skin" (with Slander and Vastive)	2026	—	—	—	—	Non-album single
"—" denotes a recording that did not chart.

== Other charted songs ==
List of songs, with selected chart positions, showing year released and album name
Title	Year	Peak chart positions			Album
Title	Year	US Hard Rock Digital	US Hot Hard Rock	NZ Hot	Album
"Hysteria"	2022	9	—	—	Rotoscope
"Sew Me Up"	2022	10	—	—	Rotoscope
"Fata Morgana"	2025	—	14	—	Tsunami Sea
"Black Rainbow"	2025	—	16	—	Tsunami Sea
"Keep Sweet"	2025	—	11	39	Tsunami Sea
"Tsunami Sea"	2025	—	18	—	Tsunami Sea
"A Haven With Two Faces"	2025	—	20	—	Tsunami Sea
"Crystal Roses"	2025	—	22	—	Tsunami Sea
"—" denotes a recording that did not chart.

== Music videos ==
List of music videos, showing year released and directors names
Title	Year	Director(s)	Ref.
"The Mara Effect, Pt. 3"	2017	Mike Stringer & Courtney LaPlante	
"The Mara Effect, Pt. 1"	2018	Mike Stringer & Courtney LaPlante	
"Perennial"	2018	Dylan Hryciuk	
"Electric Cross"	2018	—N/a	
"Belcarra"	2019	—N/a	
"Bleach Bath"	2019	Dylan Hryciuk	
"Rule of Nines"	2019	—N/a	
"Blessed Be"	2020	Dylan Hryciuk	
"Holy Roller"	2020	—N/a	
"Holy Roller" (featuring Ryo Kinoshita)	2020	Deadeyesart	
"Constance"	2020	Dylan Hryciuk	
"Circle with Me"	2021	Orie McGinness	
"Secret Garden"	2021	Jensen Noen	
"Hurt You"	2021	Dylan Hryciuk	
"Rotoscope"	2022	Max Moore	
"Jaded"	2023	Caleb Mallery	
"Cellar Door"	2023	Orie McGinness	
"Ultraviolet"	2023	Dylan Hryciuk	
"Angel Eyes"	2023	Orie McGinness	
"Too Close / Too Late"	2023	Orie McGinness	
"Soft Spine"	2024	Orie McGinness	
"Perfect Soul"	2024	Dylan Hryciuk	
"No Loss, No Love"	2025	Max Moore & Mike Stringer	
"Mourning"	2026	Alex Bemis & Mike Stringer	
