= Cellar door =

Cellar door may refer to:

- Cellar door (phrase), commonly cited in popular culture as a beautiful-sounding English phrase
- Cellar door (wine), sales room at a winery
- Cellar Door: Terminus ut Exordium, 2014 release by The Underachievers
- Cellar Door (John Vanderslice album), 2004 release by John Vanderslice
- The Cellar Door, music club in Washington DC 1964–81
  - The Cellar Door Sessions 1970, 2005 release of 1970 Miles Davis sessions at the club
  - Live at The Cellar Door, 1975 album by The Seldom Scene
  - Live at the Cellar Door, 2013 album by Neil Young, recorded in 1970
- Cellar Door (film), 2024 film starring Laurence Fishburne
- "Cellar Door", a song by Angus & Julia Stone on the album Snow, 2017
- "Cellar Door", a song by Spiritbox on the EP The Fear of Fear, 2023

== See also ==
- Celador, British production company (a homophone of 'cellar door')
- Cellar (disambiguation)
- Door (disambiguation)
