= Dort =

Dort may refer to:

- Dort (surname), includes a list of people with the name
- Dort Motor Car Company, an automobile manufacturer in Flint, Michigan from 1915 to 1924
- Dort or Dordrecht, a city and municipality in the western Netherlands
- Dort, an alien robot from the 2026 film Minions & Monsters

== See also ==
- Dordt (disambiguation)
- Dord (disambiguation)
