= TYG (song) =

2024 song by Megan Thee Stallion featuring Spiritbox

Song by Megan Thee Stallion featuring Spiritbox

from the album Megan: Act II
- Released: October 25, 2024
- Genre: Rap metal; trap metal
- Length: 2:27
- Label: Hot Girl Productions
- Songwriters: Megan Thee Stallion; Courtney LaPlante; Mike Stringer; Bankroll Got It; Shawn "Source" Jarrett; Dan Braunstein
- Producers: Bankroll Got It; Braunstein; Stringer; Jarrett

"TYG" (an acronym for "Test Your Gangsta") is a song by American rapper and songwriter Megan Thee Stallion featuring Canadian heavy metal band Spiritbox. It is the eighth track from her super deluxe reissue album Megan: Act II.

== Background ==
"TYG" is the second collaboration between Megan Thee Stallion and Spiritbox, following the previous year's "Cobra (Rock Remix)". The track was co-written by Megan with Spiritbox's Courtney LaPlante and Mike Stringer, among others. According to Revolver, Spiritbox recorded their parts for the song in less than 36 hours. LaPlante described working with Megan as "a fever dream".

== Composition ==
According to Consequence, the song features Megan delivering rapid-fire verses alongside LaPlante, whose screamed vocals contribute to the track's aggressive sound. It incorporates nu-metal-influenced guitar riffs and blends rap and metal elements, which Revolver described as a rap-metal track and Rock Sound called a "genre-smashing track" that experiments with cross-genre collaboration.

NME described the song as fierce trap metal, while Alternative Press characterized it as a hard-hitting rap-metal track with world-building elements.

According to Metal Hammer, the track features half-tempo, guitar-driven hip hop rhythms, with LaPlante's screamed vocals adding intensity, while MXDWN reported that the song combines trap-influenced beats with heavy guitar work and a mix of clean and screamed vocals.

== Critical reception ==
MetalSucks described the song as "a pretty damn good track" and said it gave the band an opportunity to reach a broader audience.

== Live performances ==
The song debuted live on April 13, 2025, at Coachella, with LaPlante joining Megan on stage. Revolver described the performance as "fiery".

== Charts ==
Chart (2024)	Peak position
US Hot Rock & Alternative Songs (Billboard)	37

== Personnel ==
Credits adapted from Apple Music.

- Megan Thee Stallion - vocals, songwriter
- Courtney LaPlante - vocals, songwriter
- Mike Stringer - guitar, drums, bass, songwriter, producer
- Bankroll Got It - songwriter, producer
- Shawn "Source" Jarrett - songwriter, recording engineer, producer
- Dan Braunstein - drums, songwriter, producer, mixing engineer
