= Maphra =

Metal singer

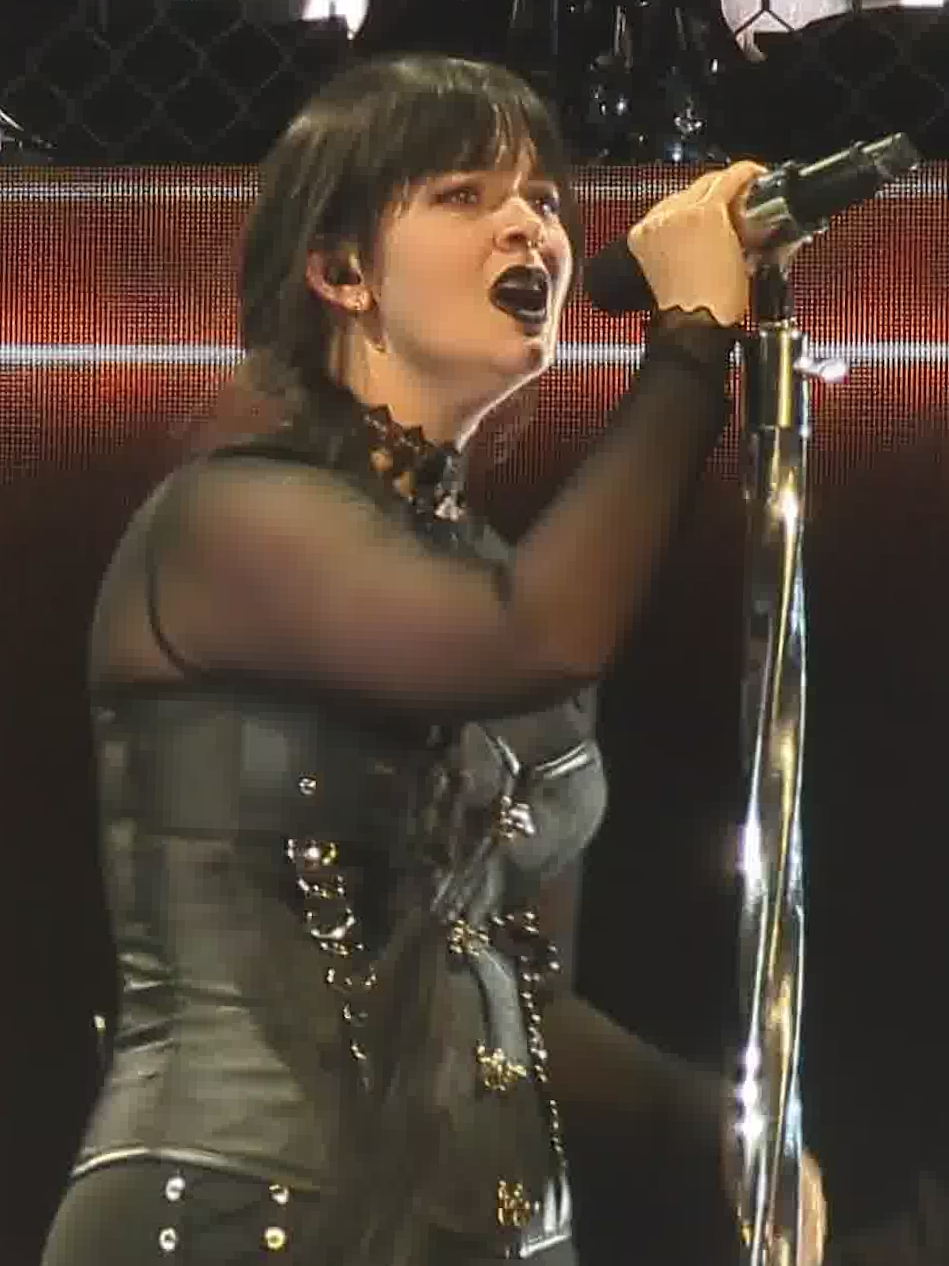
- Maphra performing with Bring Me The Horizon at Sonic Temple 2026

Background information
- Genres: Metal; pop
- Instrument: Vocals
- Years active: 2025–present

Maphra (stylized as MAPHRA) is a singer of metal and pop music. A contralto, she is capable of rapid transition between clean and harsh vocals. She is best known for her cover version of "Doomed" by Bring Me the Horizon. She is represented by United Talent Agency. Her full name and background have not been revealed to the public.

== History ==
Maphra's first published music was a cover of "Lovely" by Billie Eilish and Khalid, released in February 2025.

Maphra had her breakthrough with a YouTube video where she performed the song "Doomed" by Bring Me the Horizon. Her version achieved over 38 million views on YouTube and attracted attention from YouTubers such as The Charismatic Voice and Anthony Vincent. It ranked first or second on the Billboard Hot Hard Rock Songs chart for nine consecutive weeks, which is unusual for a cover of a rock song. Her interpretation of "Circle with Me" by Spiritbox also charted.

After Maphra published a cover of "Silence" by The Plot in You, the band's lead singer Landon Tewers praised her singing skills, commenting that even he could not reach the high notes as well as Maphra.

Her live debut followed in May 2026 at Welcome to Rockville, where she performed with Ice Nine Kills, filling in Mckenna Grace's sections for the live debut of their song "Twisting The Knife". A week later, Maphra performed "Doomed" with Bring Me the Horizon at Sonic Temple.

As of October 2026 her YouTube hit over 100,000,000 views in total. Her cover version of "Doomed" was streamed more than 42 million times on Spotify.

== Discography ==
=== Singles ===
List of singles, with selected chart positions, showing year released and album name
| Title | Year | Peak chart positions | Album |
| Title | Year | US Hard Rock | Album |
|---|---|---|---|
| "Lovely" (re-imagined) | 2025 | — | Non-album singles |
| "Doomed" | 2026 | 1 | Non-album singles |
| "Circle with Me" | 2026 | 5 | Non-album singles |
