= Eternal Blue =

Eternal Blue may refer to:

- EternalBlue, a National Security Agency (USA) cyberattack exploit
- Eternal Blue, a 2021 album by Spiritbox which takes its name from the exploit
- Lunar: Eternal Blue, a role-playing video game by Game Arts and Studio Alex
