= Doerr =

Doerr is a respelling of Dörr, a German surname. Notable people with the surname include:

- Anthony Doerr (born 1973), American writer
- Bobby Doerr (1918–2017), American baseball player and coach
- Carola Doerr (born 1984), German computer scientist
- Harriet Doerr (1910–2002), American writer
- John Doerr (born 1951), American businessman
- Robert Doerr (c. 1914 – 2013), American politician and educator
- Steve Doerr (born 1959), American soccer player
- Susan Doerr (born 1945), American swimmer
- Thomas Doerr (born 1964), American architect and writer

== See also ==
- Dorr (disambiguation)
