= Dordt =

Dordt may refer to:

- Dordt University, a college in Sioux Center, Iowa, United States
- Dordrecht, a city and municipality in the western Netherlands
  - FC Dordt, a football club from the city of Dordrecht
  - Synod of Dordt, church council held in Dordrecht in 1618–1619

== See also ==
- Dord (disambiguation)
- Dort (disambiguation)
