= Dort (surname) =

Dort is a surname. Notable people with the surname include:

- Filip Dort (born 1980), Czech footballer
- Josiah Dallas Dort (1861–1925), American carriage and automobile manufacturer
- Luguentz Dort (born 1999), Canadian basketball player

== See also ==
- Dorr (surname)
- Van Dort, surname
