= The Door =

The Door may refer to:

== Literature ==
- The Door (Szabó novel), a 1987 novel by Magda Szabó
- The Door (poetry collection), a 2007 book of poetry by Margaret Atwood
- The Door, a 1930 novel by Mary Roberts Rinehart
- The Door, the name used by the Christian satire magazine The Wittenburg Door during the 80s, 90s, and early 2000s
- The Door (interstellar teleporter), an interstellar transportation device used in the science fiction works of Lloyd Biggle, Jr.

== Film, theatre and television ==
- The Door (Theatre), a studio theatre in Birmingham, England
- The Door (TV series), a 2010 television series broadcast on British television station ITV1
- The Door (2009 film), a German film starring Mads Mikkelsen
- The Door, a 2008 Oscar nominated short film written and directed by Juanita Wilson
- The Door, a 2013 short film written and directed by Ava DuVernay
- The Door (2012 film), a Hungarian film based on the 1987 novel by Magda Szabó
- The Door (2025 film), an Indian Tamil language horror film by Jaiiddev
- "The Door" (Game of Thrones), a 2016 episode of Game of Thrones
- "The Door" (Fear the Walking Dead), an episode of the television series Fear the Walking Dead

== Music ==
=== Albums ===
- The Door (Keb' Mo' album), 2000
- The Door (Charlie Daniels album), 1994
- The Door (Mathias Eick album), 2008
- The Door (Steve Lacy album), 1988
- The Door (EP), the debut EP by Turin Brakes

=== Songs ===
- "The Door" (George Jones song), a 1974 country song by George Jones
- "The Door" (Silverchair song), a 1997 song by Silverchair from their album Freak Show
- "The Door" (Teddy Swims song)
- "The Door", a 2008 song by Moka Only from the album Carrots and Eggs
- "The Door", a 2018 song by Toby Fox from Deltarune Chapter 1 OST from the video game Deltarune

== See also ==
- The Doors, an American band
- Door (disambiguation)
