= Circle with Me =

Single by Spiritbox

from the album Eternal Blue
- Released: April 30, 2021
- Recorded: 2021
- Genre: Djent
- Length: 3:53
- Label: Pale Chord; Rise
- Songwriters: Courtney LaPlante; Daniel Braunstein; Bill Crook; Mike Stringer
- Producer: Daniel Braunstein

Spiritbox singles chronology
"Constance" (2020)	"Circle with Me" (2021)	"Secret Garden" (2021)

Music video
- "Circle with Me" on YouTube

"Circle with Me" is a song by Canadian heavy metal band Spiritbox. Written by Courtney LaPlante, Daniel Braunstein, Bill Crook, and Mike Stringer, it was produced by Braunstein. The song was released on April 30, 2021, through the band's label Pale Chord Records in partnership with Rise Records, and was the third single from the band's debut studio album, Eternal Blue. Following commercial success, the song has become the band's most streamed song, and was the band's first to be certified gold by the Recording Industry Association of America in September 2025.

== Background and release ==
On April 26, 2021, the band announced they would be releasing a single, titled "Circle with Me" later that week. The song was released on April 30, alongside its music video, directed by Orie McGinness, and was the first single from Eternal Blue to be released after the album's recording was complete, with "Holy Roller" and "Constance" having been released earlier in 2020. LaPlante stated that it was the last song written for the album, being worked on in-person rather than remotely, and was a "last-minute addition", and noted that the lyrics were written to reflect her "spectrum of emotions" from anxiety and self-doubt to confidence. Following the announcement of the song's gold certification in August 2025, the band stated that "Hurt You" was originally intended to be the first released single, but the band switched to "Circle with Me" the day before the video was recorded.

== Composition ==
"Circle with Me" has been described as djent.

== Music video ==
The music video was released on April 30, 2021 and was directed by Orie McGinness. The video depicts the band performing, with the camera perspective circling around them. Speaking about the video, LaPlante stated she wanted the video to have "concert-style" production, going further to say that the band wanted to "present the viewer with the image of us that we miss the most", noting on live on-stage performances, as the song was recorded and released during the COVID-19 pandemic.

== Live performances ==
In October 2024, the band performed the song at Louder Than Life festival in Louisville, Kentucky, featuring guest vocals from Tatiana Shmayluk of Jinjer.

== Commercial performance ==
Since its release, the song has become the band's most streamed song on Spotify. The song peaked at number one on the Hard Rock Digital Song Sales chart and number five on the Hot Hard Rock Songs chart. The song earned the band their first certification, being certified gold by the Recording Industry Association of America in September 2025.

== Personnel ==
Credits are adapted from AllMusic and the liner notes from Eternal Blue.

Spiritbox

- Courtney LaPlante – lead vocals
- Michael Stringer – guitar, bass, drums, background vocals
- Zev Rosenberg – drums
- Bill Crook – background vocals

Additional personnel

- Daniel Braunstein – production, engineering, drums
- Jens Bogren – engineering

== Charts ==
Chart performance for "Circle with Me"
Chart (2021)	Peak position
US Digital Song Sales (Billboard)	71
US Hard Rock Digital Song Sales (Billboard)	1
US Hot Hard Rock Songs (Billboard)	5
US Rock Digital Song Sales (Billboard)	12
US Hot Rock & Alternative Songs (Billboard)	50

== Certifications ==
Certifications for "Circle with Me"
Region	Certification	Certified units/sales
United States (RIAA)	Gold	500,000^{‡}
^{‡} Sales+streaming figures based on certification alone.

== Cover versions ==
The song was covered by singer Maphra in late 2025, and was released as her second single in 2026, being her second to chart, reaching number five on the Hot Hard Rock Songs chart.
