= Tsunami Sea =

2025 studio album by Spiritbox

Studio album by Spiritbox
- Released: March 7, 2025
- Recorded: 2024
- Genres: Metalcore; progressive metalcore; alternative metal; djent
- Length: 43:40
- Labels: Pale Chord; Rise
- Producers: Dan Braunstein; Mike Stringer

Spiritbox chronology
The Fear of Fear (2023)	Tsunami Sea (2025)

Singles from Tsunami Sea
- 1. "Soft Spine" Released: September 6, 2024; 2. "Perfect Soul" Released: November 18, 2024; 3. "No Loss, No Love" Released: February 6, 2025

Tsunami Sea is the second studio album by the Canadian heavy metal band Spiritbox. It was released on March 7, 2025, through Pale Chord and Rise Records. After releasing two extended plays in 2022 and 2023, it is the full-length follow-up to the highly successful Eternal Blue (2021).

== Background ==
After production issues related to the COVID-19 pandemic delayed its release for 17 months, the band's debut album, Eternal Blue, was released in September 2021 to overwhelming success. The pandemic also disrupted the album's promotion cycle; both of the first two tours the band attempted were cancelled, the latter of which almost caused them to collapse from financial hardship. Thanks to gifts from other artists, the band stabilized and was able to continue. The band's first full tour finally proceeded in early 2022, and touring for the album's promotion concluded in mid-2023. In the interim, the band released the extended plays Rotoscope and The Fear of Fear in mid-2022 and late 2023, respectively. The Fear of Fear contained "Jaded" and "Cellar Door", two songs which would each be nominated for a Grammy Award for Best Metal Performance in consecutive years.

On December 14, 2023, LaPlante confirmed in a Revolver interview that the band planned to create another full-length album in 2024. That same day, Korn announced a July 2024 concert in Poland which featured Spiritbox as a guest. The following month, it was announced Spiritbox would accompany Korn for their United Kingdom tour in August 2024, and a few days after that, it was revealed the band was briefly in a recording studio with Jordan Fish, the keyboardist who had recently departed Bring Me the Horizon.

== Promotion ==
Spiritbox embarked on a European headlining tour in February 2025, making five stops in Germany and one each in London, Paris and Tilburg. On September 6, 2024, the band released the single "Soft Spine"; a music video for the song followed on September 26. On November 18, the band announced the title of the album would be Tsunami Sea. Set to be released on March 7, 2025, the band released the album's second single, "Perfect Soul", alongside the announcement. A North American tour supported by Loathe and Dying Wish began in early April 2025. Gel was originally announced as an opener, but was dropped after their breakup in March 2025. The album's third single, "No Loss, No Love", was released on February 6, 2025. A fourth track, "Crystal Roses", was briefly released on March 3, 2025. According to LaPlante, however, the band did not authorize its release, and the song was shortly removed.

== Composition ==
Musically, Tsunami Sea has been described as a metalcore, progressive metalcore, alternative metal, and djent album that experiments with spoken word, electronic, drum and bass, industrial metal, alternative rock, pop, electropop, and EDM.

== Critical reception ==
Professional ratings
Aggregate scores
Source	Rating
AnyDecentMusic?	9.0/10
Metacritic	85/100
Review scores
Source	Rating
AllMusic	3.5/5 stars
The Arts Desk	5/5 stars
Blabbermouth.net	8/10
Distorted Sound	9/10
Dork	5/5
The Guardian	4/5 stars
Kerrang!	5/5
Metal Hammer	4.5/5 stars
NME	5/5 stars
Wall of Sound	9.5/10

On Metacritic, a review aggregator site that compiles reviews from mainstream publications and assigns a weighted average score out of 100, Tsunami Sea received a score of 85 based on four critic reviews. This score indicated "universal acclaim". Tom Carr of The Arts Desk called it "a sonic assault" that is "graceful and beautiful". Anne Erickson of Blabbermouth.net wrote, "Spiritbox don't take many chances on "Tsunami Sea", but that makes sense considering that the sound and style they've honed is so popular right now." Paul Brown of Wall of Sound also noted that the album was less adventurous than it could have been, but posited that "to some, those signature djent riffs may come across as stale and overused; but...they've simply evolved into a beacon of recognition which helps you identify the group."

Conversely, several reviewers praised the album for simultaneously exploring new influences and refining their existing sound, although Ben Beaumont-Thomas of The Guardian felt that the "adventurous songcraft occasionally gets the better of them," and wrote that "the production throughout is heavily compressed sometimes to the detriment of the low end." James Hickie of Kerrang! and Rich Hobson of Metal Hammer both considered it a worthy follow-up to Eternal Blue. Tom Morgan of NME praised the album's mix of heaviness and beauty, writing, "The punishing elegance of Spiritbox’s new album will punch a hole through your chest and wrap its aqueous arms around your heart."

The album cover won the 2026 Juno award for Album artwork of the Year; it was presented to art director Kevin Moore and photographer Kyle Joinson.

== Track listing ==
All lyrics are written by Courtney LaPlante; all music is composed by LaPlante, Mike Stringer, and Dan Braunstein.

Tsunami Sea track listing
No.	Title	Length
1.	"Fata Morgana"	4:21
2.	"Black Rainbow"	3:24
3.	"Perfect Soul"	3:59
4.	"Keep Sweet"	4:03
5.	"Soft Spine"	3:03
6.	"Tsunami Sea"	4:16
7.	"A Haven with Two Faces"	5:31
8.	"No Loss, No Love"	2:56
9.	"Crystal Roses"	3:19
10.	"Ride the Wave"	4:53
11.	"Deep End"	3:47
Total length:		43:40

Tsunami Sea (Live bonus edition) track listing
No.	Title	Length
12.	"Fata Morgana (Live from Alexandra Palace London)"	6:03
13.	"Perfect Soul (Live from L'Olympia Paris)"	4:52
Total length:		54:35

== Personnel ==
Credits adapted from the album's liner notes and Tidal.

=== Spiritbox ===
- Josh Gilbert – backing vocals (tracks 3, 4, 6, 7, 10, 11)
- Courtney LaPlante – vocals
- Zev Rosenberg – drums
- Mike Stringer – bass, drums, guitar, production, engineering

=== Additional contributors ===
- Dan Braunstein – production, engineering
- Zakk Cervini – mixing
- Ted Jensen – mastering
- Julian Gargiulo – mixing assistance
- Zach Tuch – additional drum engineering
- James Knoerl – additional engineering (3–9, 11)
- Kevin Moore – art direction, design
- Kyle Joinson – all photography

== Charts ==
Chart performance for Tsunami Sea
Chart (2025)	Peak position
Australian Albums (ARIA)	34
Austrian Albums (Ö3 Austria)	10
Belgian Albums (Ultratop Flanders)	80
Belgian Albums (Ultratop Wallonia)	59
Canadian Albums (Billboard)	114
Dutch Albums (Album Top 100)	83
Finnish Albums (Suomen virallinen lista)	39
French Albums (SNEP)	113
French Rock & Metal Albums (SNEP)	9
German Albums (Offizielle Top 100)	12
German Rock & Metal Albums (Offizielle Top 100)	6
Japanese Download Albums (Billboard)	75
New Zealand Albums (RMNZ)	36
Portuguese Albums (AFP)	193
Scottish Albums (Official Charts)	8
Swiss Albums (Schweizer Hitparade)	21
UK Albums (Official Charts)	17
UK Independent Albums (Official Charts)	1
UK Rock & Metal Albums (Official Charts)	3
US Billboard 200	26
US Independent Albums (Billboard)	4
US Top Rock & Alternative Albums (Billboard)	3
