= Soft Spine =

Single by Spiritbox

from the album Tsunami Sea
- Released: September 6, 2024
- Recorded: 2024
- Studio: Hallway Studios, California
- Genre: Djent; extreme metal
- Length: 3:03
- Label: Pale Chord; Rise
- Songwriters: Courtney LaPlante; Daniel Braunstein; Mike Stringer
- Producers: Daniel Braunstein; Mike Stringer

Spiritbox singles chronology
"Cobra" (2023)	"Soft Spine" (2024)	"Perfect Soul" (2024)

Music video
- "Soft Spine" on YouTube

"Soft Spine" is a song by Canadian heavy metal band Spiritbox. Written by Courtney LaPlante, Daniel Braunstein, and Mike Stringer, it was produced by Braunstein and Stringer. The song was released on September 6, 2024, through the band's label Pale Chord Records in partnership with Rise Records, and was the first single from the band's second studio album, Tsunami Sea. The song was nominated for Best Metal Performance at the 68th Annual Grammy Awards. A djent and extreme metal track, it was described as a "hater song" by Stringer. The song's lyrics served as an exercise in stress release for LaPlante toward individuals she did not like without having to address anyone directly.

== Background and release ==
Following the band's performance at the Reading and Leeds Festival in August 2024, the band began posting teasers for new music on their social media accounts, including puzzles and a timer ending on September 6, culminating on September 5 with the announcement they would be releasing a new single the following day titled "Soft Spine", sharing the lyric "You all deserve each other" alongside the announcement.

Ahead of the band supporting Korn's North American tour with Gojira the following week and the band's own European tour supported by Periphery and Stray from the Path the following February, the song was released on September 6, with a press release promising "more exciting things to come from the band in the near future", hinting at their next studio album. The song was recorded at Hallway Studios in California.

With lyrics touching on enemies and "those who profit from you", Stringer described the song as a "hater song", with LaPlante stating the song's inspiration was that she "hates so many people", and often declares before performances the song "goes out to everyone I hate". Speaking further about this in an interview with Zach Sang, she said that:

"I'm not someone that likes to have a lot of outward drama, but internally there's a lot of people that I don't just feel neutral about in our industry, I have full on strong feelings towards them, and that song really made me feel like it's the fantasy that people have of the max stress they can put on someone they don't like. [...] The fantasy of feeling that you have that power professionally to rise above people that you don't like is very empowering for me..."

A number of fans suspected the song may be directed at Ronnie Radke, leading to a one-sided drama from the latter. Radke and his band, Falling in Reverse, had once been billed together with Spiritbox on a tour supporting Falling in Reverse's album, Popular Monster (2023), but Spiritbox dropped off the tour after Radke was accused of assault by a former fan. However, LaPlante declined to name a specific person that the song is about.

== Music video ==
The music video was released on September 27, 2024, and was directed by Orie McGinness. The video depicts a fight between LaPlante and cloaked figures, in a futuristic arena amidst crashing waves.

== Live performances ==
The song debuted live on September 12, 2024, in Tampa, Florida, at the first show of Korn's North American tour, on which the band were supporting. On September 29, the band were joined on stage by Poppy, providing additional vocals during the song's performance at Louder Than Life festival in Louisville, Kentucky.

On July 7, 2025, the band performed the song on Jimmy Kimmel Live!, becoming the band's first song performed on live television.

On February 1, 2026 the band performed the song at the 68th Annual Grammy Awards.

== Composition and reception ==
The song has been described as djent, and extreme metal, with influences from nu-metal.

At the 2026 Awards, the song became the band's third Grammy Award nomination for Best Metal Performance, following "Cellar Door" in 2025 and "Jaded" in 2024.

The song reached number five on the Billboard Hard Rock Digital Song Sales chart.

== Personnel ==
Credits adapted from the liner notes for Tsunami Sea and Tidal.

Spiritbox

- Courtney LaPlante – vocals
- Zev Rosenberg – drums
- Mike Stringer – bass, drums, guitar, production, engineering

Additional personnel

- Dan Braunstein – production, engineering
- Zakk Cervini – mixing
- Ted Jensen – mastering
- Julian Gargiulo – mixing assistance
- Zach Tuch – additional drum engineering

== Charts ==
Chart performance for "Soft Spine"
Chart (2024)	Peak position
US Hard Rock Digital Song Sales (Billboard)	5
US Hot Hard Rock Songs (Billboard)	11
