= Megan: Act II =

Studio album (reissue) by Megan Thee Stallion
- Released: October 25, 2024
- Length: 30:22
- Labels: Hot Girl Productions; Warner Music
- Producers: 2C's; Bankroll Got It; B HAM; Chriz Beats; Dan Braunstein; Drumma Boy; Buddah Bless; Peter Fenn; FnZ; Shae Jacobs; Shawn "Source" Jarrett; Roger Jia; KaiGoinKrazy; Tay Keith; Kingsley; Koshy; LilJuMadeDaBeat; Truckee Street; NicoBaran; Maxwell Scott; Mike Stringer

Megan Thee Stallion chronology
Megan (2024)	Megan: Act II (2024)

Singles from Megan: Act II
- 1. "Neva Play" Released: September 6, 2024; 2. "Bigger in Texas" Released: October 25, 2024

Megan: Act II is a reissue of American rapper Megan Thee Stallion's third studio album, Megan (2024). It was released through Hot Girl Productions and Warner Music Group on October 25, 2024. The album features guest appearances from Flo Milli, Twice, Spiritbox, and RM of BTS, who appears on the track "Neva Play".

== Background ==
In October 2023, Megan Thee Stallion officially left her label 1501 Certified Entertainment, three years after suing the label for allegedly failing to uphold the integrity of and renegotiate her recording contract. The first post-departure project was her third studio album, Megan, released on June 28, 2024. It debuted at number three on the US Billboard 200 and featured the US number-one song "Hiss", the album's second single.

Following the album's release, Megan Thee Stallion promoted "Mamushi" (2024), featuring Japanese musician Yuki Chiba, as the final single from Megan. Later that year, she began teasing a collaboration with a member of the South Korean boy group BTS, having worked with them on a remix of the group's 2021 single "Butter". The collaboration, "Neva Play", featured rapper RM and was released on September 6. The same month, she posted a short video on Instagram that showed her transforming into a butterfly and several photos that read "Act Two" when arranged as a grid. Megan Thee Stallion captioned the video by saying "Stay tuned". Megan Thee Stallion teased the then unnamed project as a mixtape on October 3 via her X account, claiming it would be the "hardest mixtape of 2024". She later officially announced the Megan: Act II deluxe edition on October 18 via her Instagram account, later revealing the tracklist on October 23.

== Critical reception ==
Professional ratings
Review scores
Source	Rating
NME	5/5 stars
Pitchfork	7/10

Kyann-Sian Williams of NME gave the album 5 out of 5 stars, writing that the second act "confirms why she [...] despite all the adversity that has plagued her in recent years, firmly stands atop the rap world as the princess of rap", praising the collaborations, which "improve greatly on those that were offered up on Megan". Matthew Ritchie of Pitchfork rated the album 7 out of 10 and wrote in a review, "The album feels spiritually aligned to her Tina Snow and Something for Thee Hotties tapes: a creative recentering marked by funny, well-varnished raps that arrive with a refreshing lightness and freedom."

== Track listing ==
Megan: Act II disc 1 track listing
No.	Title	Lyrics	Music	Producer(s)	Length
1.	"Bigger in Texas"	Megan Pete	Joel Banks; Taylor Banks; Shawn "Source" Jarrett; Han Yang Kingsley Wang; Trevin Clay	Bankroll Got It; Shawn "Source" Jarrett; Kingsley; Truckee Street	2:32
2.	"Bourbon"	Pete	J. Banks; T. Banks; Jarrett	Bankroll Got It; Jarrett	2:46
3.	"Number One Rule"	Pete	Julian Mason; Tyron Douglas; Patrick Houston; Paul Beauregard; Jordan Houston	LilJuMadeDaBeat; Buddah Bless	2:20
4.	"Roc Steady" (featuring Flo Milli)	Pete; Tamia Carter	Mason; Ciara Harris; Moses Barrett III; Garrett Hamler; Craig Love; LaMarquis Jefferson; Zachary Wallace; Jonathan Smith	LilJuMadeDaBeat	2:19
5.	"Best Friend"	Pete	J. Banks; T. Banks; Jarrett; Nicholas Baran; Kai Hasegawa	Bankroll Got It; Jarrett; Nico Baran; KaiGoinKrazy	2:22
6.	"Right Now"	Pete	Brytavious Chambers; Michael Mulé; Isaac De Boni	Tay Keith; FnZ	2:52
7.	"Mamushi" (remix; featuring Twice)	Pete; Yuki Chiba; Nija Charles; Tre'Von Waters; Nayeon; Jeongyeon; Momo; Sana; Jihyo; Mina; Dahyun	Koshiro Ota	Koshy	2:35
8.	"TYG" (featuring Spiritbox)	Pete; Courtney LaPlante	Mike Stringer; J. Banks; T. Banks; Jarrett; Dan Braunstein	Stringer; Bankroll Got It; Jarrett; Braunstein	2:27
9.	"Motion"	Pete	Christopher Gholson; Christopher Williams-Green; CC Montrell Chaney	Drumma Boy; Chriz Beats; 2C's	2:14
10.	"Fell in Love"	Pete	J. Banks; T. Banks; Jarrett	Bankroll Got It; Jarrett	2:27
11.	"He Think I Love Him"	Pete	Radric Davis; Jamal Jones	Bankroll Got It; Jarrett; Kingsley; Roger Jia; Maxwell Scott	1:35
12.	"Like a Freak"	Pete	Kevin Nishimura; James Roh; Virman Coquina; Jae Choung; David Singer-Vine; Niles Holowell-Dhar	Bankroll Got It; Jarrett	1:16
13.	"Neva Play" (featuring RM of BTS)	Pete; Nam-joon Kim	Adrienne Ben Haim; Brandon Hamlin; Peter Fenn; Shae Jacobs; Mason	B HAM; Peter Fenn; Shae Jacobs; LilJuMadeDaBeat	2:37
Total length:					30:22

=== Notes ===
- Disc 2 mirrors the track listing of Megan. An alternate digital edition included Megan: Act II as disc 2, with the original Megan track list as disc 1 instead.
- "Roc Steady" contains a sample from "Goodies" performed by Ciara and Petey Pablo, produced by Lil Jon.
- "He Think I Love Him" contains a sample from "I Think I Love Her" performed by Gucci Mane and Ester Dean, produced by Polow Da Don.
- "Like a Freak" contains a sample from "Like a G6" performed by Far East Movement and Dev, produced by The Cataracs.

== Personnel ==
- Megan Pete – lead vocals, writer (all tracks)
- Flo Milli – featured vocals (track 4)
- Twice – featured vocals (track 7)
- Spiritbox – featured vocals (track 8)
- RM – featured vocals (track 13)
- Dan Braunstein – drums (track 8)
- Mike Stringer – guitar, bass, drums (track 8)

== Certifications ==
Certifications for Megan: Act II
Region	Certification	Certified units/sales
United States (RIAA)	Gold	500,000^{‡}
^{‡} Sales+streaming figures based on certification alone.
