= Dorr =

Dorr may refer to:

- Dorr (surname)
- Dorr, Iran, a village in Isfahan Province, Iran
- Dorr Township, McHenry County, Illinois
- Dorr Township, Michigan
  - Dorr, Michigan

== See also ==
- Door (disambiguation)
- Dorr Rebellion
- Wilmer Cutler Pickering Hale and Dorr, American law firm
