= The Fear of Fear =

EP by Spiritbox
- Released: November 3, 2023
- Recorded: January 2023
- Studio: The Hallway (Woodland Hills)
- Genres: Metalcore; alternative metal; djent
- Length: 25:02
- Labels: Pale Chord; Rise
- Producers: Daniel Braunstein; Mike Stringer

Spiritbox chronology
Rotoscope (2022)	The Fear of Fear (2023)	Tsunami Sea (2025)

Singles from The Fear of Fear
- 1. "The Void" Released: April 19, 2023; 2. "Jaded" Released: August 25, 2023; 3. "Cellar Door" Released: October 13, 2023

The Fear of Fear is the fourth extended play (EP) by the Canadian heavy metal band Spiritbox. It was released on November 3, 2023, through Pale Chord and Rise Records. It is their first EP to chart, peaking at number 116 on the Billboard 200.

== Release ==
"The Void" was released as the lead single on April 19, 2023. The second single, "Jaded", was released on August 25, along with the announcement of the EP. The third single, "Cellar Door", was released on October 13. The Fear of Fear EP was released on November 3, 2023 through Pale Chord and Rise. On the same day of the EP's release, the band released a music video for the songs, "Ultraviolet" and "Angel Eyes". They also released a music video for the song "Too Close/Too Late" on November 4.

== Promotion ==
On May 2, 2023, the band was announced as support for the fall leg of Shinedown's Revolutions Live tour along with Papa Roach. They preceded this tour with a performance at Rock am Ring in June.

== Composition ==
Musically, The Fear of Fear has been described as metalcore, alternative metal, and djent.

== Reception ==
Professional ratings
Review scores
Source	Rating
AllMusic	3/5 stars
Distorted Sound	8/10
Dork	4/5 stars
Metal Hammer	4/5 stars
Metal Injection	9/10
Wall of Sound	9.5/10

The Fear of Fear received positive reviews from critics. Ali Shutler of Dork wrote "The Fear Of Fear is a tightly wound record that showcases a band growing in confidence and getting increasingly comfortable with what they are." According to Will Marshall of Distorted Sound the EP is "rooted in the approach to modern metalcore evidenced on Eternal Blue but does show more of that drive to move beyond its borders, just as Rotoscope did, though arguably to a greater degree." Dannii Leivers of Metal Hammer wrote, "Spiritbox could have easily...[rushed] out Eternal Blue v2, but instead, this is the sound of a band deciding where they want to go, unaffected by the weight of expectation, and taking us along for the ride." Jordan Blum of Metal Injection stated, "its truncated duration prevents it from feeling as epic and substantial as Eternal Blue, but its masterful sequencing...still provide plenty of enticing and inventive connective tissues." Paul Brown writing for Wall of Sound felt that "Whether it’s the soul-crushing heavy hits or the softly delivered melodic rock songs, they always keep us guessing and they’re only getting better with each release they unleash."

The song "Jaded" earned a Grammy nomination for Best Metal Performance. "Cellar Door" was nominated for Best Metal Performance the following year.

== Track listing ==
All lyrics are written by Courtney LaPlante; all music is composed by Courtney LaPlante, Mike Stringer and Daniel Braunstein.

The Fear of Fear track listing
No.	Title	Length
1.	"Cellar Door"	4:43
2.	"Jaded"	4:22
3.	"Too Close / Too Late"	4:41
4.	"Angel Eyes"	3:28
5.	"The Void"	3:40
6.	"Ultraviolet"	4:08
Total length:		25:02

== Personnel ==
Personnel per liner notes.

Spiritbox

- Courtney LaPlante – vocals
- Mike Stringer – guitars, bass, drums, backing vocals (tracks 2, 3 and 6)
- Zev Rosenberg – drums
- Josh Gilbert – backing vocals (tracks 2, 3, 5 and 6)

Production

- Daniel Braunstein – production, engineering
- Zakk Cervini - mixing, engineering
- Mike Stringer – co-production

== Charts ==
Chart performance for The Fear of Fear
Chart (2023)	Peak position
Scottish Albums (Official Charts)	47
UK Album Downloads (OCC)	7
UK Albums Sales (OCC)	44
UK Physical Albums (OCC)	43
UK Independent Albums (Official Charts)	13
UK Rock & Metal Albums (Official Charts)	5
US Billboard 200	116
US Top Independent Albums (Billboard)	25
US Top Rock & Alternative Albums (Billboard)	26
US Top Hard Rock Albums (Billboard)	5
