= Door (disambiguation) =

A door is a panel or barrier used to cover an opening in a wall or partition.

Door or doors may also refer to:

== Places ==
- Door County, Wisconsin, United States
- Door Creek, Wisconsin, an unincorporated community in the United States
- Door Peninsula, Wisconsin, United States
- The Dooars region of India

== Arts, entertainment, and media ==
=== Film and television ===
- "The Door" (Game of Thrones), a 2016 episode
- Westworld: The Door, the second season of the series Westworld
- "Door" (Neverwhere), a 1996 episode
- Door (film), 1988 Japanese horror film
- The Doors (film), about the rock band
- Doors (film), a 2021 science fiction anthology film
- "Doors" (The Bear), a 2024 episode of The Bear TV series

=== Music ===
==== Albums ====
- Door (Every Little Thing album), 2008
- Door (Fieldwork album), 2008
- Door (Junoon album), 2016
- Doors (album), by saxophonist Eric Kloss, 1972
- The Doors (album), 1967

==== Other uses in music ====
- Door (EP), by Chen, 2024
- "Door", a song by C418 from Minecraft – Volume Alpha, 2011
- "Door", a song by Caroline Polachek from Pang, 2019
- "Door", a song by I Dont Know How But They Found Me from Razzmatazz, 2020
- "Door", a song by Kwon Eun-bi from Open, 2021
- "A Door", a song by Aaron Tippin from Greatest Hits… and Then Some, 1997
- "Doors" (song), by Noah Kahan
- "Doors", a song by Michael Johnson from Dialogue, 1979
- The Doors, a rock band

==== Video games ====
- Doors (Roblox experience), a video game on Roblox

=== Other uses in arts, entertainment, and media ===
- Door, a character in the Neil Gaiman novel and television series Neverwhere
- The San Diego Door, an underground newspaper 1968–1974
- The Wittenburg Door, a humor and satire magazine

== Computing ==
- BBS door, an interface between a bulletin board system and an external program
- Doors (computing), an interprocess communication mechanism
- IBM Rational DOORS, a requirement management tool

== See also ==
- Dooars
- Dorr (disambiguation)
- The Door (disambiguation)
