= Dorr (surname) =

Dorr and Dörr are surnames of German origin. Notable people include:

- Bert Dorr (1862–1914), American Major League Baseball pitcher
- Charles Dorr (1852–1914), U.S. Representative from West Virginia
- Ebenezer P. Dorr (1817–1882), American mariner and meteorologist
- Esteban Dorr (born 2000), French table tennis player
- Franz Dörr (1913–1972), German World War II fighter ace
- Friedrich Dörr (1908–1993), German Catholic priest, professor of theology and hymnwriter
- Gustav Dörr (1887–1928), German World War I fighter pilot
- Hans Dorr (1912–1945), German Waffen-SS Obersturmbannführer
- John V. N. Dorr (1872–1962), American industrial chemist
- Julia Caroline Dorr (1825–1913), American author
- Kevin Dorr, American musician
- Larry Dorr, manager of Blood, Sweat & Tears
- Laurence Joseph Dorr (b. 1953), American botanist
- Rheta Childe Dorr (1868–1948), American author and social worker
- Richard Everett Dorr (1943–2013), United States federal judge
- Robert F. Dorr (1939-2016), U.S. diplomat and author
- Thomas Wilson Dorr (1805–1854), leader of the Dorr Rebellion in Rhode Island
- Wilhelm Dörr (1881–1955), German track and field athlete
- Wilhelm Dörr (Nazi) (1921-1945), German SS and concentration camp officer executed for war crimes
