= Dord (disambiguation) =

Dord is a word accidentally created via an error in lexicography.

Dord may also refer to:

- Dord (instrument), a bronze horn native to Ireland
- Dominique Dord (born 1959), a member of the National Assembly of France

== See also ==
- Dordt (disambiguation)
