= Ebenezer P. Dorr =

Ebenezer Pearson Dorr (13 March 1817 – 29 March 1881) was a merchant sailor, insurance executive, and meteorologist.

Dorr was born in Hartford, Vermont. His earliest inclinations were for a seafaring life and when only ten years of age he sailed from Newburyport as a boy before the mast. In 1838, Dorr settled in Buffalo, New York, and became a sailor on the Great Lakes, serving as captain of several vessels.

In 1843, Dorr became marine inspector for the Buffalo Mutual Insurance Company, and acted as agent of the New York board of underwriters for "the entire northwest" (the Great Lakes region). He was also for some time the Buffalo representative of many insurance companies, and served for seven years as president of the Board of Inland Underwriters.

He was the first to organize a regular system of wreckage on the Great Lakes, and did much to improve the condition of seamen and to obtain recognition of their acts of heroism.

Dorr was also a leader in Buffalo's business community. He acted at different times as president of the Board of Trade, the Society of Fine Arts, and the Historical Society of Buffalo, and as vice-president of the National Board of Trade.

When the idea of systematic weather reporting was first suggested, Dorr took up the duty. At the request of Matthew Fontaine Maury, superintendent of the U.S. Naval Observatory, Dorr submitted daily meteorological observations from Buffalo, NY.

On January 5, 1874, Captain Dorr presented a paper entitled "A Brief Sketch of the First Monitor and its Inventor" to the Historical Society of Buffalo.

Mr. Dorr was well acquainted with many prominent naval officers, and was elected an Associate Member of the Naval Institute in 1879, and a member in 1880.

"He died in Aiken, S.C., March 29, 1881"

== Sources ==
- Appleton's Encyclopedia, p. 205
- United States Naval Institute Proceedings Vol. VIII. 1882 No.19 Annapolis, MD.

http://www.findagrave.com/cgi-bin/fg.cgi?page=pv&GRid=118802663&PIpi=90740661
