= Rotoscope (EP) =

EP by Spiritbox
- Released: June 22, 2022
- Recorded: 2022
- Genres: Alternative rock; nu metal; metalcore; industrial metal
- Length: 10:50
- Labels: Pale Chord; Rise
- Producers: Dan Braunstein; Mike Stringer

Spiritbox chronology
Eternal Blue (2021)	Rotoscope (2022)	The Fear of Fear (2023)

Singles from Rotoscope
- 1. "Rotoscope" Released: June 22, 2022

Rotoscope is the third extended play (EP) by Canadian heavy metal band Spiritbox. It was released on June 22, 2022, through Pale Chord and Rise Records, and was produced by Dan Braunstein and Mike Stringer. The EP was the band's first release following the departure of bassist Bill Crook in May 2022.

== Background ==
Following the release of their debut album Eternal Blue, Courtney LaPlante and Mike Stringer spoke in an interview with Kerrang! magazine in April 2022 about recording new music. They described their writing process as "doing what makes you happy" as they aimed to avoid limiting their creativity by sticking to fans' expectations. LaPlante suggested that the new music might have been different enough from their previous music that some fans would hate it, but she said that enjoys that, stating she "thrives on negativity", and went on to say that the writing and recording process "energized" her.

== Release and promotion ==
The EP was surprise released on June 22, 2022, during their first European tour. Alongside the EP, the band also released a music video for the title track, directed by Max Moore. The title track also reached number 7 on the US Hard Rock Digital chart, 17 on the US Hot Hard Rock chart, and number 1 on the UK Official Vinyl Singles Chart.

== Composition ==
Rotoscope has been described by critics as alternative rock, nu metal, metalcore, industrial metal, with influences from 90s music, djent, industrial music, grunge, dance music, indie, and pop. The EP's sound has been compared to that of Health, Garbage, Shirley Manson, Deftones.

== Critical reception ==
Professional ratings
Review scores
Source	Rating
Boolin Tunes	9.5/10
Distorted Sound	8/10
Sputnikmusic	4/5

Rotoscope was well received by critics.

Maximo David of Boolin Tunes wrote that the band had shown "clear growth and progression in their sound", praising the various alternative sounds of the EP, going on to commend the band for "progressing their sound in new and interesting ways, while still maintaining a sense of identity", calling the EP the band's "most engaging and most unique" release thus far. Writing for Distorted Sound magazine, Will Marshall was also impressed by the band's sonic evolution, creativity, and the "varied and adventurous" nature of the EP. Sputnikmusic's Mateo Ottie called the EP a "jolt to the system", impressed by the different sound, and praised the band for their passion and experimentation in their songwriting.

== Track listing ==
All lyrics are written by Courtney LaPlante, Mike Stringer and Dan Braunstein; all music is composed by LaPlante, Stringer and Braunstein.

Rotoscope track listing
No.	Title	Length
1.	"Rotoscope"	3:35
2.	"Sew Me Up"	3:31
3.	"Hysteria"	3:44
Total length:		10:50

== Personnel ==
Credits adapted from the liner notes and Tidal.

Spiritbox

- Courtney LaPlante – vocals
- Mike Stringer – guitars, bass, co-production
- Zev Rosenberg – drums

Production

- Dan Braunstein – production, engineering, mixing

== Release history ==
Region	Date	Format	Label	Ref.
Various	June 22, 2022	Digital download; streaming; vinyl	Pale Chord; Rise	
