= Spiritbox =

Canadian heavy metal band

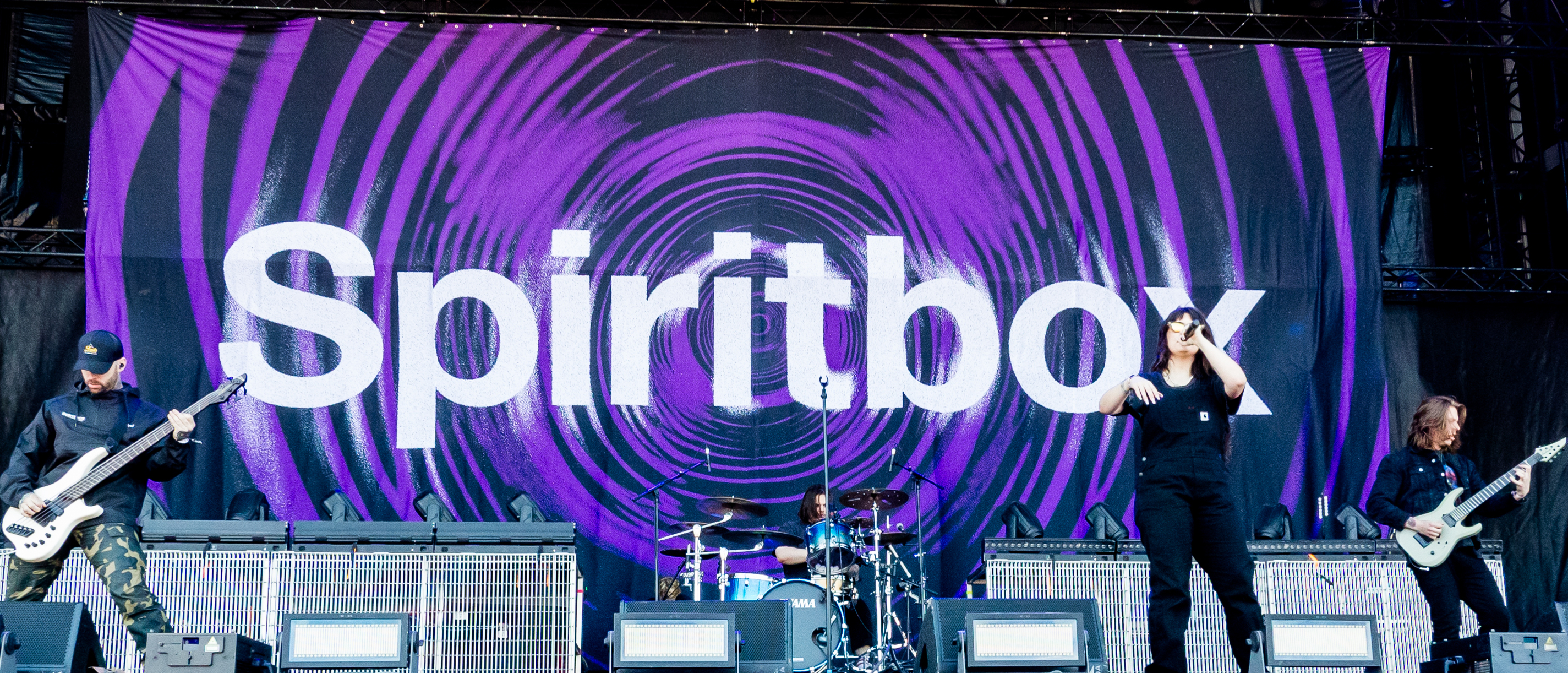
- Spiritbox performing at Rock am Ring 2023

Background information
- Origin: Victoria, British Columbia, Canada
- Genres: Metalcore; alternative metal; djent; progressive metal; post-metal
- Works: Spiritbox discography
- Years active: 2016–present
- Labels: Pale Chord; Rise
- Spinoff of: Iwrestledabearonce
- Members: Courtney LaPlante; Mike Stringer; Zev Rose; Josh Gilbert
- Past members: Ryan Loerke; Bill Crook
- Website: spiritbox.com

Spiritbox is a Canadian heavy metal band, originally from Victoria, British Columbia, publicly established by guitarist Mike Stringer and vocalist Courtney LaPlante in October 2017. The band's full lineup comprises married couple LaPlante and Stringer alongside drummer Zev Rose and bassist Josh Gilbert. The band's style is rooted in metalcore and progressive metal, incorporates electronic elements and draws from a variety of influences, while LaPlante's singing is inspired by R&B. Their music is currently released through their label, Pale Chord, via a partnership with Rise Records.

LaPlante and Stringer had been members of Iwrestledabearonce, but were dissatisfied with their roles and founded Spiritbox to better express themselves artistically. They released a debut extended play, Spiritbox (2017), followed by a second EP, Singles Collection (2019), with an expanded lineup. Spiritbox initially built their fanbase through online promotion and music videos before debuting as a touring band in 2020. They continued to gain popularity with several singles that reached the Billboard charts before releasing their debut album Eternal Blue (2021), which entered the US Billboard 200 at number 13. They released their third EP, Rotoscope, in 2022 and their fourth EP, The Fear of Fear, in 2023. The band's second studio album, Tsunami Sea, released on March 7, 2025.

== History ==
=== 2015–2019: Formation and early years ===
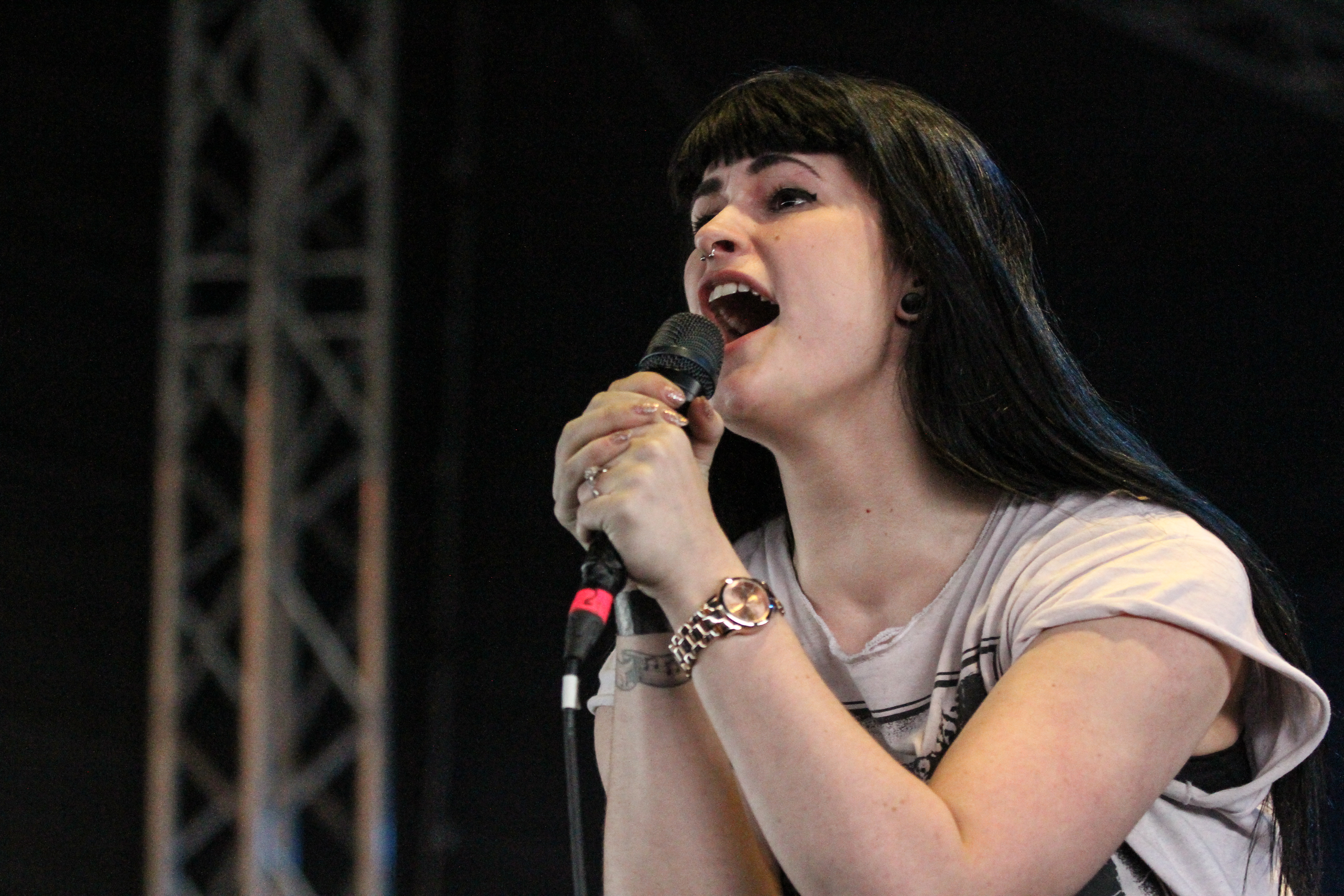
Courtney LaPlante, shown performing with Iwrestledabearonce in 2013, left that band in 2015 to form what became Spiritbox.

Before co-founding Spiritbox, singer Courtney LaPlante and guitarist Mike Stringer were both in Iwrestledabearonce. The couple were engaged during this time, and since 2011 had wanted to form their own joint musical project. In late 2015, they decided to quit the band. LaPlante and Stringer had each replaced a previous member of Iwrestledabearonce, and were never comfortable with that status in the band; the two also desired to pursue a new personal and creative direction. The couple decided to take a break from touring and return home to find regular employment. Throughout 2015, multi-instrumentalist Stringer presented LaPlante demos of songs in different musical styles to help them decide on a direction for their band. LaPlante and Stringer married in 2016 and began recording songs two weeks later. Stringer wrote the drum parts for a planned extended play, which were rearranged by their session drummer at the time, former Iwrestledabearonce bandmate Mikey Montgomery. The EP was recorded by LaPlante and Stringer in their home studio, along with their friend Tim Creviston. It was mixed and mastered by former Volumes member Dan Braunstein in Los Angeles.

On October 9, 2017, LaPlante and Stringer announced the launch of their band, Spiritbox, based in Victoria, British Columbia. LaPlante explained that Iwrestledabearonce had made no statement regarding their situation, and thus, on October 25, she officially confirmed her departure from Iwrestledabearonce. Spiritbox ultimately received over $38,000 in funding from FACTOR (the Foundation to Assist Canadian Talent on Records), funded by the Government of Canada and private broadcasters, to support the band's recording and touring. As Spiritbox, the couple released a seven-song self-titled debut EP on October 27, 2017, which followed a single, "The Beauty of Suffering". Soon afterward, the project was paused for some time, finding themselves deadlocked in their efforts to play the songs in live performances without additional musicians.

In 2018, Bill Crook of the pop-punk band Living with Lions joined the band as the permanent bassist. Shortly after, they secured permanent drummer Ryan Loerke, who also played in the Kelowna-based Shreddy Krueger. Jason Mageau, the former manager of Iwrestledabearonce, founded the Pale Chord label to release Spiritbox's music through a distribution deal with The Orchard. Mageau advised the band to promote Spiritbox's music online for two years rather than undertaking an expensive touring regimen. While Spiritbox grew their fan base, they released a five-song EP titled Singles Collection on April 26, 2019. Throughout 2018 and 2019, the band composed most of the songs for their intended debut album.

=== 2020–2021: Eternal Blue ===
Loerke left the band in 2020, and Philadelphia-based drummer Zev Rose (full family name Rosenberg) was recruited. The band's debut full-length album, Eternal Blue, was originally scheduled for release in 2020, but production was interrupted due to the COVID-19 pandemic. The band's first tour, a supporting slot for After the Burial in Europe, was canceled for the same reason. On July 3, 2020, Spiritbox released the single "Holy Roller", which achieved critical and commercial success, debuting at No. 25 on Billboard Hot Hard Rock Songs. The song's original version spent seven weeks as No. 1 on SiriusXM Liquid Metal's Devil's Dozen, and was deemed the best song of 2020 by the station's listeners. In September 2020, Spiritbox announced that they had signed with Rise Records, as part of the label's partnership with Pale Chord.

On October 4, 2020, the band released a remix of "Holy Roller" featuring Ryo Kinoshita of Crystal Lake. The remix spent five weeks as No. 2 spot on the Devil's Dozen. On December 4, 2020, Spiritbox debuted "Constance", a song about dementia that was dedicated to LaPlante's grandmother. In the same month, a Kerrang! magazine reader's poll voted Spiritbox as "New Band of the Year". The continued release of "super popular" music videos created anticipation for Spiritbox's forthcoming album.

In January 2021, Revolver included Spiritbox's upcoming release in its list of "60 Most Anticipated Albums of 2021". Due to quarantine rules, the band gathered in isolation at a studio in Joshua Tree, California, to continue working on their debut album. They set a deadline of April 2021 to ensure that the album would release that year. The third single from the album, "Circle with Me", was released on April 30, 2021. In May, LaPlante appeared on the cover of the May issue of Kerrang!. On May 25, 2021, the band released the single "Secret Garden", which landed in the top 40 of the Billboard Mainstream Rock chart. While the band was recording the album, the Grammy Museum asked Spiritbox to perform and record a live acoustic version of "Constance" as part of their Collection: Live series in a church, accompanied by a string ensemble. The acoustic version of the song premiered in July 2021. The band attempted to tour again in July 2021, supporting Limp Bizkit in the US; this was also canceled after a few dates due to safety concerns involving the pandemic. This aborted tour with Limp Bizkit led the band to many unexpected expenses; Shinedown singer Brent Smith offered Spiritbox $10,000 to help cover lost tour expenses, while We Came as Romans waived rental charges for their lighting package. According to Stringer, Smith was empathetic and did not want the band to collapse due to financial hardship. Smith decided to donate despite having never met the band before. One final single, "Hurt You", was released in advance of the album on August 20, 2021.

At the end of August 2021, the band's songs surpassed 80 million streams across all global streaming platforms. All physical releases and most merchandising items were sold out. By this time, Eternal Blue was described as one of the most anticipated debut albums of 2021 by Alternative Press, Kerrang!, and Metal Hammer.

Nearing the release of Eternal Blue in mid-September 2021, LaPlante revealed that drummer Rose was an official member of Spiritbox. Since joining in early 2020, Rose had not been photographed with the band, leading to speculation that he was not an official member, though LaPlante explained that this was because of travel restrictions during the COVID-19 pandemic that prevented Rose from physically joining the band in Victoria. The band had met Rose in-person only two days before embarking on their first tour.

Eternal Blue was released on September 17, 2021, to positive reviews from critics. LaPlante said she considered Eternal Blue as the realization of "[her] true voice". The album peaked at No. 13 on the US Billboard 200, No. 3 on the Top Album Sales chart, and at the top of Billboard's Top Rock Albums and Hard Rock Albums charts. The album peaked at No. 8 on the ARIA Charts and No. 19 on the UK Albums Chart. According to Pollstar, Spiritbox's official merchandise store grossed $1 million from its opening in May 2020 to October 2021, with sales earning between $30,000 and $60,000 per month.

=== 2021–2024: Return to touring and EPs ===
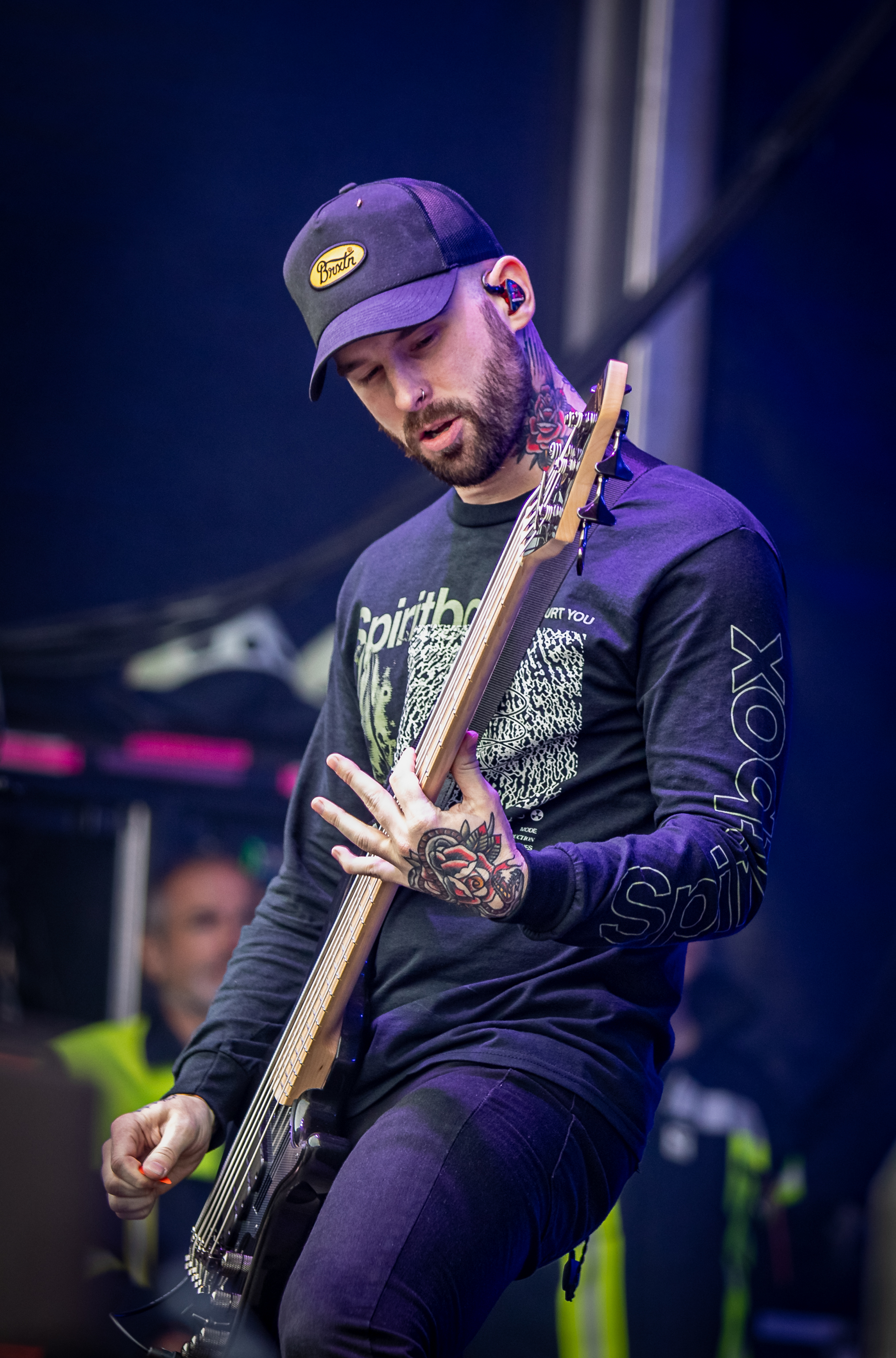
Josh Gilbert began playing with Spiritbox in 2022.

In October 2021, Spiritbox performed on the Coheed and Cambria-headlined S.S. Neverender cruise, produced by Norwegian Cruise Line partner Sixthman. In August 2021, Spiritbox was announced as one of the supporting bands on Underoath's Voyeurist tour, along with Bad Omens and Stray from the Path, in February and March 2022. (Note: Initially, Every Time I Die was to join Underoath and Spiritbox on this tour; however, the band broke up in January 2022.) In May 2022, dubstep artist Illenium released the single "Shivering", which showcased Spiritbox in their feature debut. Ghost announced a few days later that Spiritbox would be guests alongside Mastodon as opening acts for the second North American leg of their Imperatour through August and September 2022. However, Spiritbox announced the departure of bassist Bill Crook less than a week later, a mutual decision within the band. Spiritbox quickly recruited Josh Gilbert, who had recently left As I Lay Dying, as their temporary touring bassist. He would be welcomed as a full-time member in April 2023.

The band played their first live show in the United Kingdom in June 2022 at Download Festival. On June 22, the band released the three-song Rotoscope EP and a video for the title track "Rotoscope". Guitar World noted that the title track was a dance-like number, while the other two tracks "Sew Me Up" and "Hysteria" were "synth-flavored arrangements". In November 2022, Spiritbox announced their first headlining tour of the United States; they were joined by After the Burial and Intervals from April to May 2023. On March 7, 2023, Falling in Reverse announced the Popular Monstour, a tour of the United States on which Spiritbox would perform as a guest at six shows. However, in the following days, Falling in Reverse frontman Ronnie Radke attracted controversy after a fan who alleged him of assault drew an aggressive response from Radke on Twitter. On March 13, Spiritbox announced from their own Twitter account that they had dropped off the dates they were scheduled for the tour.

On April 19, 2023, the band released a new single, "The Void". Two weeks later, the band was announced as support for the fall leg of Shinedown's Revolutions Live tour along with Papa Roach; they preceded this tour with a stop at Rock am Ring in June. On August 25, the band released another new single "Jaded", along with the announcement of a new EP. On October 13, 2023, the band released another new single "Cellar Door". The Fear of Fear EP was released on November 3, 2023 through Pale Chord and Rise. On the same day of the EP's release, the band released music videos for the songs "Ultraviolet" and "Angel Eyes". They also released a music video for the song, "Too Close/Too Late", on November 4. On November 9, 2023, the band collaborated with rapper Megan Thee Stallion for a remix of her song, "Cobra". Later that month, "Jaded" was nominated for the Best Metal Performance at the 66th Annual Grammy Awards.

=== 2024–present: Tsunami Sea ===
On December 14, 2023, Korn announced a July 2024 concert in Poland which featured Spiritbox as a guest. Meanwhile, LaPlante confirmed in a Revolver interview released the same day that the band planned to create another full-length album in 2024. On January 12, 2024, it was revealed Spiritbox would accompany Korn for their United Kingdom tour in August 2024; five days later, it was revealed the band was in a recording studio with Jordan Fish, the keyboardist who had recently departed Bring Me the Horizon. Former bassist Bill Crook died in July 2024. Spiritbox was featured on Megan Thee Stallion's album Megan: Act II on the song "TYG".

On September 6, 2024, the band released the single "Soft Spine"; a music video for the song followed on September 26. In November 2024, the band's 2023 single, "Cellar Door", was nominated for the 67th annual Grammy Awards in the category of Best Metal Performance; weeks later on November 18, the band announced their second studio album, Tsunami Sea, with a release date of March 7, 2025. The album's second single, "Perfect Soul", was released alongside the announcement. The album's third single, "No Loss, No Love", was released on February 6, 2025. Spiritbox embarked on a European headlining tour in February 2025, making five stops in Germany and one each in London, Paris and Tilburg. On March 3, 2025, the song, "Crystal Roses", appeared on streaming services. The band did not approve of the single release, and the song was shortly removed.

The band promoted Tsunami Sea in North America by splitting it into two legs. The first ran from April through May 2025, featuring Loathe and Dying Wish as supporting acts. Gel was to join the three on the tour, but the band broke up two weeks before the tour began. The second leg, announced in July, began in November and concluded in December; Periphery and Honey Revenge served as opening acts. In November 2025, the band's song, "Soft Spine", was nominated for Best Metal Performance at the upcoming 68th Annual Grammy Awards; they performed the song at the Premiere Ceremony for the presentation.

The promotion of Tsunami Sea will extend into the United Kingdom and Europe in September and October 2026; Dying Wish will rejoin Spiritbox alongside Jinjer for this leg of the tour. The band collaborated with Slander and Vastive on the song "Under My Skin", and released the song on June 12, 2026. Another single, "Mourning", was released on September 7, 2026, shortly before the UK tour began.

== Musical style and influences ==
Spiritbox employs several heavy metal-based musical styles. Max Morin wrote for Metal Injection that attempting to assign the band a single genre label is "pointless". Critics have described their style as metalcore, alternative metal, djent, progressive metal, post-metal, melodic metalcore, hard rock, deathcore, and nu metal. (Note: Musical styles: "metalcore" or "melodic metalcore"; "alternative metal"; "djent"; "progressive metal"; "post-metal"; "hard rock"; "deathcore"; "nu metal") They have also been labelled as "post-metalcore". John D. Buchanan of AllMusic wrote that "[Spiritbox echos] acts like Tesseract, Deftones, and Evanescence, their sound -- incorporating elements of metalcore, nu-metal, prog, shoegaze, and djent -- combines crushing heaviness with atmospheric ethereality, while Courtney LaPlante's versatile voice swoops from gorgeous melodicism to tortured screams and shrieks." Bobby Olivier of Billboard wrote that the band displayed aspects ranging from atmospheric to industrial. Revolver's Eli Enis described the band's musical style as an arrangement of "alt-metal with elegant vocals and thunderous djent grooves". In a 2019 interview, LaPlante said the band's music was constructed out of a progressive metal foundation before being condensed for the final version of the songs. However, she more closely identified Spiritbox as a metalcore group near the release of Eternal Blue, though she also said that "[her] main goal with this band is fluidity".

The band integrates electronic elements within their sound as distinctive characteristics, as part of a musical genre evolving through the artistic use of new technologies. Guitar World wrote that Spiritbox "successfully mastered the art of digitally infused metal" while "maintaining a sonic stamp that's completely their own". The digital synthesizer appears as a particular sonic aspect of much of the band's music. Spiritbox combined electronic styles after deriving inspiration from the 1980s pop music scene, Nine Inch Nails, and early post-punk bands such as the Cure. The band has acknowledged that the impact of 1980s dark rock and pop bands, embodied by uncluttered musical compositions through synthesizer minimalism in "airy" song structures, inspired Spiritbox's style.

LaPlante and Stringer have credited Alexisonfire and Protest the Hero as early musical influences which carried over into their work with Spiritbox. The band referred to Depeche Mode and Tears for Fears as particularly significant influences. Stringer's guitar playing style includes a "Gojira-esque pick scrape technique". LaPlante has cited Tesseract, Deftones, Kate Bush, and Amy Lee as influences, and she has mentioned that Meshuggah is her "standard bearer" in heavy metal. She has also expressed admiration for Gojira, Loathe, Bring Me the Horizon, Björk, Beyoncé, and FKA Twigs. Kerrang! additionally observed "clear influences on the tones and tunings" of the band from the Acacia Strain and Architects.

LaPlante's vocal phrasing, based on her musical expression, is influenced by contemporary R&B artists such as Doja Cat, H.E.R., SZA, and the Weeknd. LaPlante's singing has received acclaim from music critics. Morin called her "one of the best vocalists in the modern metal scene". Sam Coare of Kerrang! highlights her vocal performance saying that "few frontpeople handle the transition from cleans to screams with the skill, depth and ferocity of Courtney LaPlante".

== Band members ==
Spiritbox live at Wacken Open Air 2024

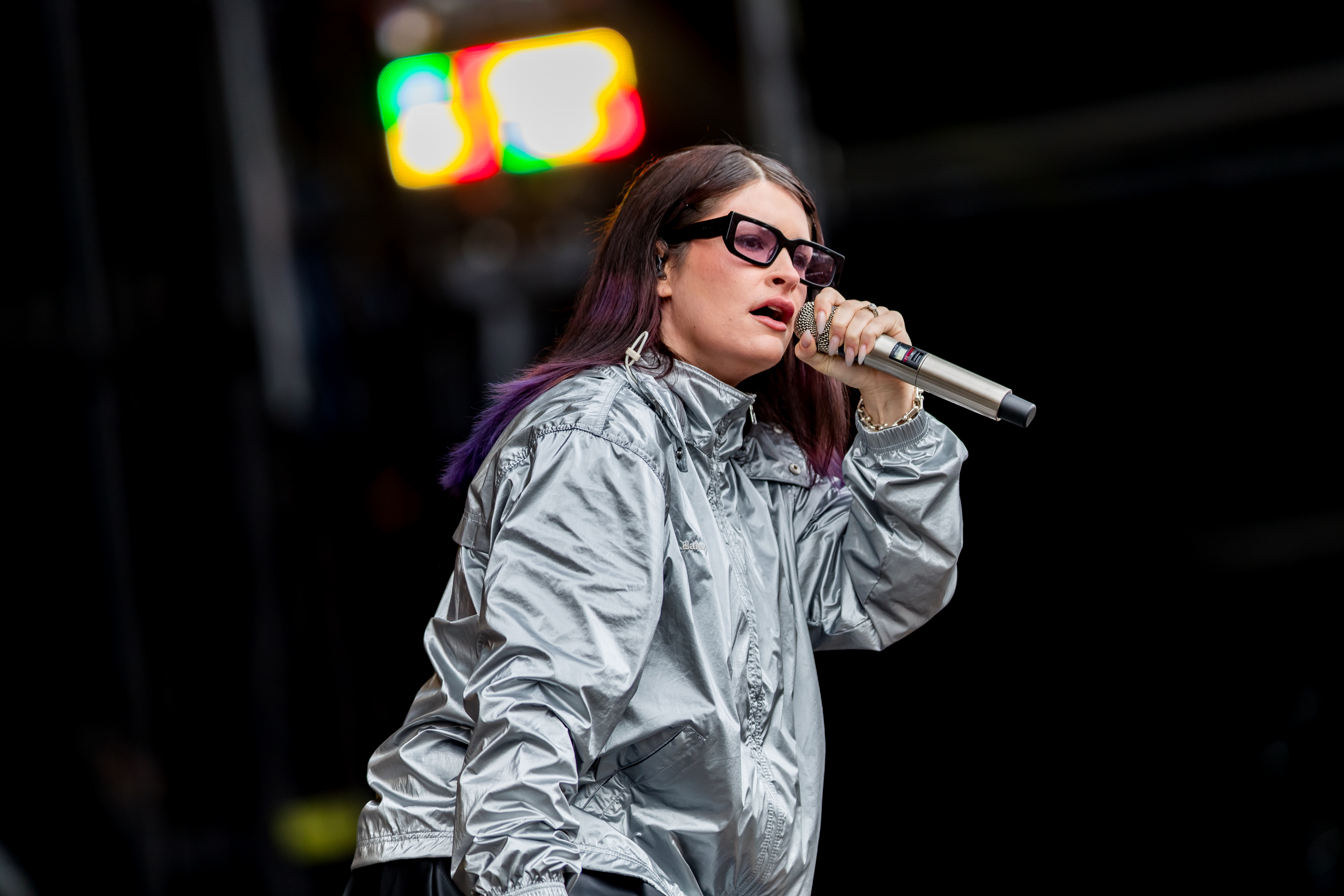
Courtney LaPlante

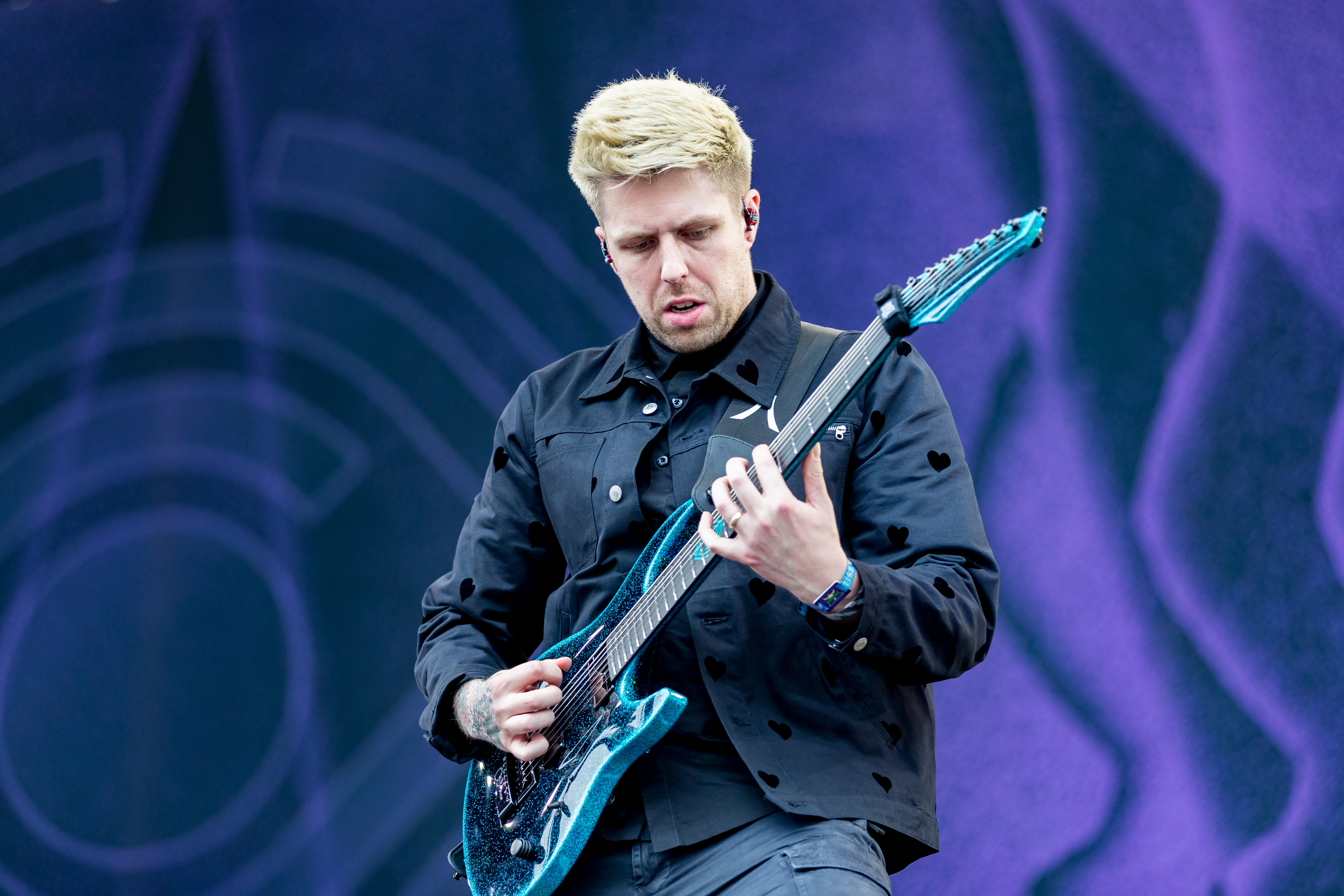
Mike Stringer

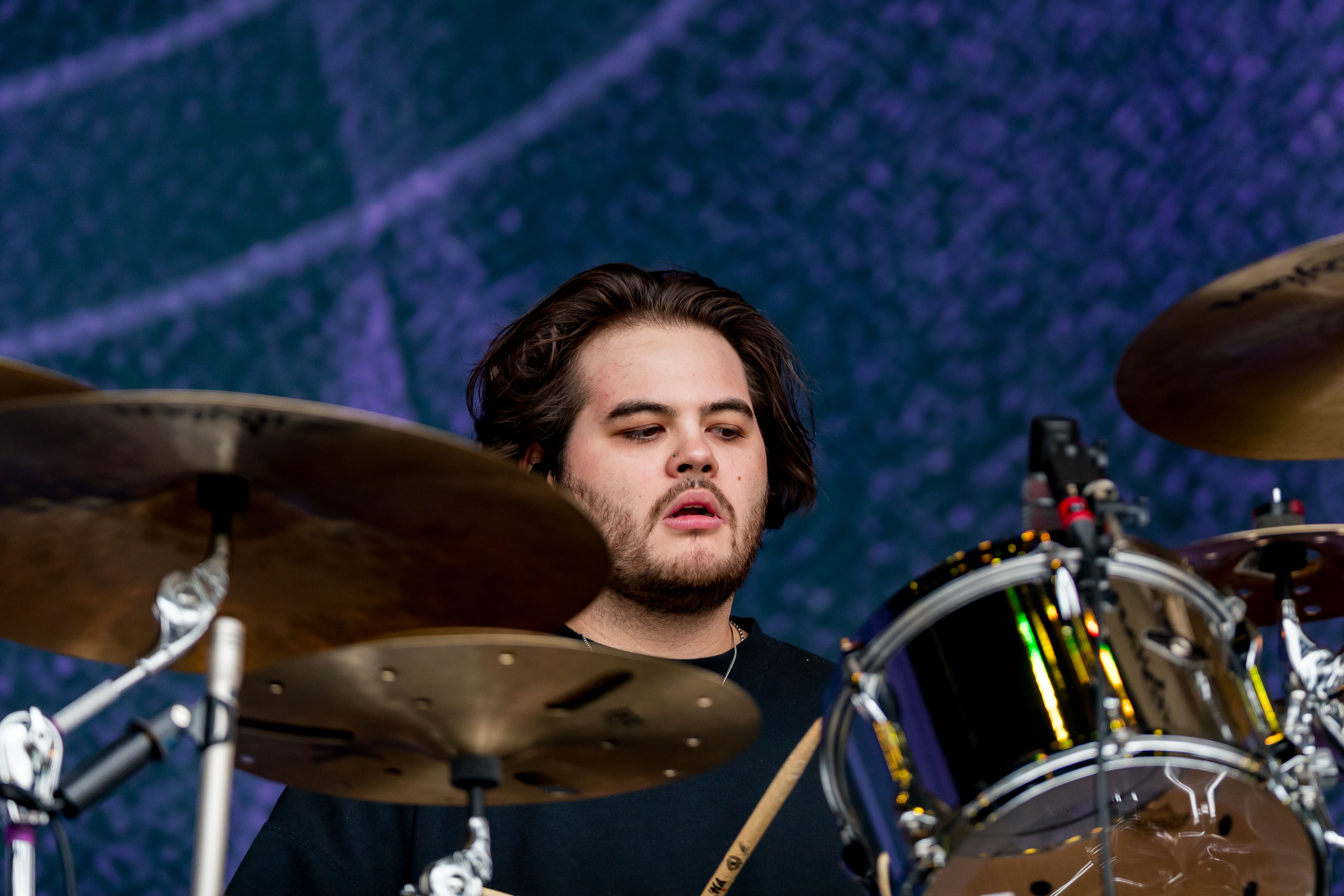
Zev Rosenberg

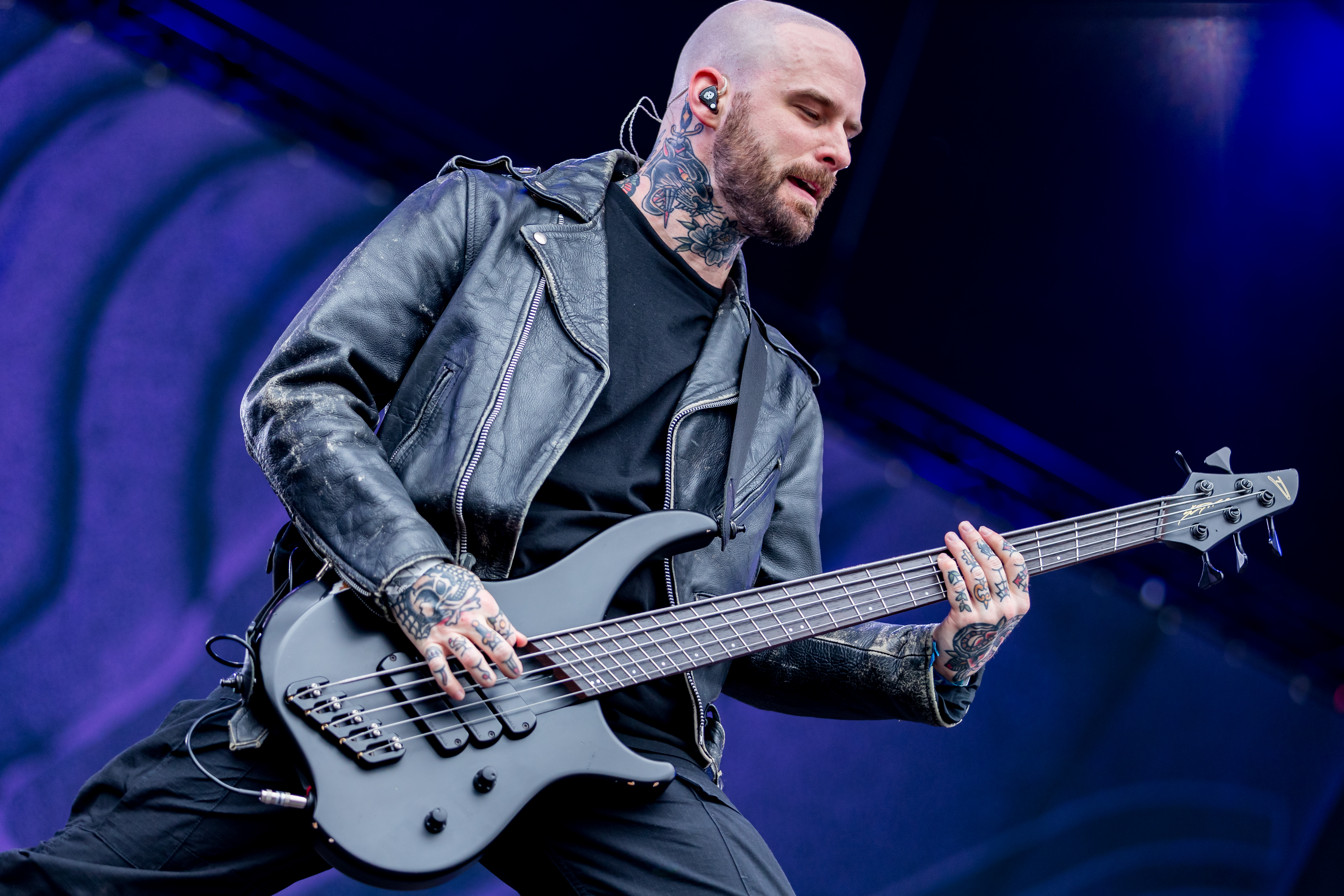
Josh Gilbert

Current

- Courtney LaPlante – lead vocals (2016–present)
- Mike Stringer – guitar, backing vocals (2016–present), drums (2016–2018), bass (2016–2018, 2022–2023)
- Zev Rosenberg – drums (2020–present)
- Josh Gilbert – bass, backing vocals (2023–present; touring 2022–2023)

Former

- Ryan Loerke – drums (2018–2020)
- Bill Crook – bass, backing vocals (2018–2022, died 2024)

Former session musicians

- Mikey Montgomery – drums (2017)

Timeline

== Discography ==
Studio albums

- Eternal Blue (2021)
- Tsunami Sea (2025)

== Awards and nominations ==
=== Grammy Awards ===
Year	Nominee / work	Award	Result	Ref.
2024	"Jaded"	Best Metal Performance	Nominated	
2025	"Cellar Door"	Best Metal Performance	Nominated	
2026	"Soft Spine"	Best Metal Performance	Nominated	

=== Heavy Music Awards ===
The Heavy Music Awards is an annual awards ceremony in partnership with Amazon Music and Ticketmaster.

Year	Nominee / work	Award	Result	Ref.
2021	Spiritbox	Best International Breakthrough Band	Won	
2024	Spiritbox	Best International Artist	Won	
2025	Spiritbox	Best International Artist	Nominated	
2025	Spiritbox	Best International Live Artist	Nominated	
2026	Spiritbox	Best International Live Artist	Nominated	
2026	Spiritbox	Best International Artist	Nominated	

=== iHeartRadio Music Awards ===
Year	Nominee / work	Award	Result	Ref.
2026	Spiritbox	Best New Artist (Rock)	Nominated	

=== Juno Awards ===
Year	Nominee / work	Award	Result	Ref.
2022	Spiritbox	Breakthrough Group of the Year	Nominated	
2022	Eternal Blue	Metal/Hard Music Album of the Year	Nominated	
2025	Spiritbox	Group of the Year	Nominated	
2025	The Fear of Fear	Metal/Hard Music Album of the Year	Nominated	
2026	Tsunami Sea	Album Artwork of the Year	Won	

=== Nik Nocturnal Awards ===
Year	Nominee / work	Award	Result	Ref.
2024	Courtney LaPlante	Vocalist of the Year	Won	
2024	Josh Gilbert	Bassist of the Year	Won	
2024	"Soft Spine"	Angriest Song of the Year	Nominated	
2024	"Soft Spine"	Best Callout of the Year	Nominated	
2024	"Soft Spine"	Song of the Year	Nominated	
2025	Mike Stringer	Guitarist of the Year	Won	
2025	Courtney LaPlante	Vocalist of the Year	Nominated	
2025	"No Loss, No Love"	Breakdown of the Year	Nominated	
2025	Tsunami Sea	Album of the Year	Nominated	

=== Saskatchewan Independent Film Awards ===
The Saskatchewan Independent Film Awards is a ceremony presented annually by the Saskatchewan Filmpool Cooperative, honoring the province's independent film achievements.

Year	Nominee / work	Award	Result	Ref.
2021	"Constance"	Best Music Video	Nominated	

=== Saskatchewan Music Awards ===
The Saskatchewan Music Awards is an annual awards ceremony established in 2018, honoring the achievements of the province's music industry.

Year	Nominee / work	Award	Result	Ref.
2020	"Blessed Be"	Music Video of the Year	Won	
