= Eternal Blue (album) =

2021 studio album by Spiritbox

- Original art without slipcase

Studio album by Spiritbox
- Released: September 17, 2021
- Recorded: February–March 1, 2021 (Note: This excludes "Holy Roller" and "Constance", which were released before this time.)
- Studio: Old Heard Ranch (Joshua Tree)
- Genres: Metalcore; progressive metal; djent; alternative metal; post-metal
- Length: 43:07
- Labels: Pale Chord; Rise
- Producers: Daniel Braunstein; Mike Stringer

Spiritbox chronology
Singles Collection (2019)	Eternal Blue (2021)	Rotoscope (2022)

Alternative cover
- Slipcase for physical editions of the album

Singles from Eternal Blue
- 1. "Holy Roller" Released: July 3, 2020; 2. "Constance" Released: December 4, 2020; 3. "Circle with Me" Released: April 30, 2021; 4. "Secret Garden" Released: May 25, 2021; 5. "Hurt You" Released: August 20, 2021

Eternal Blue is the debut studio album by the Canadian heavy metal band Spiritbox. It was released on September 17, 2021, through the band's label Pale Chord Records in partnership with Rise Records. Vocalist Courtney LaPlante and guitarist Mike Stringer formed Spiritbox in 2016 following their departure from Iwrestledabearonce. After revealing the project and releasing an extended play (EP) in 2017, Spiritbox began development on Eternal Blue in 2018. In the meantime, the band recorded several other singles that were compiled into a second EP in 2019. Their first full-length record was scheduled for an April 2020 release but development and promotion were initially halted due to the COVID-19 pandemic.

After releasing "Holy Roller" and "Constance" as singles in the latter half of 2020, Spiritbox relocated to Joshua Tree, California, in early 2021 and completed songwriting for the album. Stringer and former Volumes guitarist Daniel Braunstein produced the project, and Braunstein finished the recording in early March 2021. The music on Eternal Blue includes several heavy metal genres and subgenres, and electronic elements, and LaPlante used both screamed and clean vocals on the album. The album showcases influences from Slipknot, Deftones, Depeche Mode, Tears for Fears, and several other artists. Once recording was completed, three more songs were released as singles prior to the release of Eternal Blue: "Circle with Me", "Secret Garden", and "Hurt You".

All five singles from the album reached the American Billboard charts. The album charted in eight other countries and debuted at number thirteen on the Billboard 200; numerous publications placed the album on their yearly best-of lists. Eternal Blue received universal acclaim from music critics, who praised its production, songwriting, and musicianship.

== Background ==
In 2015, the engaged couple Courtney LaPlante and Mike Stringer were members of the American metalcore band Iwrestledabearonce. LaPlante had joined the band in 2012 to replace vocalist Krysta Cameron, who had departed mid-tour; Stringer eventually joined the band as a guitarist and played on their final album Hail Mary (2015). Eventually, LaPlante and Stringer felt their careers stagnating with the band; uncomfortable with being replacement members and wanting to pursue a new personal and creative direction, they left the band in late 2015. Following their marriage, LaPlante and Stringer announced their new project, Spiritbox, on October 9, 2017.

As Spiritbox, LaPlante and Stringer released the single "The Beauty of Suffering", which was followed by a seven-song, self-titled debut extended play (EP) on October 27, 2017. Their former Iwrestledabearonce bandmate Mikey Montgomery played drums on the EP. Bill Crook of the pop-punk band Living with Lions joined the group as a bassist, and Shreddy Krueger's Ryan Loerke became the band's first permanent drummer in 2018.

Throughout 2018 and early 2019, Spiritbox debuted five singles that were later compiled into an EP titled Singles Collection, which was released on April 26, 2019; the EP was followed by the non-album songs "Rule of Nines" in 2019 and "Blessed Be" in 2020. The tracks were all self-recorded with personal equipment, although they were mixed and mastered in another studio.

Loerke departed from Spiritbox in 2020, and was replaced by the Philadelphia-based drummer Zev Rose. According to LaPlante, the band members met Rose only two days before the band began performing with him on a short-lived tour, which was cancelled in March 2020 due to the COVID-19 pandemic.

== Recording ==
The songwriting for Eternal Blue commenced several years before its release; most of the songs were written in 2018 and 2019. "Holy Roller" was written in January 2020 and Spiritbox debuted the unfinished track on a European tour in March. The album was initially scheduled for an April 2020 release but recording was interrupted by the COVID-19 pandemic. Spiritbox released "Holy Roller" as a single in the meantime. In September 2020, the band announced they had signed with Rise Records as part of their partnership with Spiritbox's vanity label Pale Chord Records. Spiritbox started pre-production on the project with their producer, former Volumes guitarist Daniel Braunstein, via the video-conferencing platform Zoom. The band released several music videos to promote the record, which proved popular among fans and increased anticipation of the album. In January 2021, Revolver named Spiritbox's upcoming full-length release as one of its "60 Most Anticipated Albums of 2021".

The band reconvened in Joshua Tree, California, to work in "their own bubble", which allowed them to continue writing songs and revise existing material together during the pandemic. The band set a deadline of April 2021 to finish work on the album so it could be released by the end of the year. Eternal Blue was produced by Braunstein and Stringer. Braunstein recorded it with the band in complete isolation at an Airbnb rental house located on a 20-acre (8.1 ha) desert property in Joshua Tree, referred to as the Old Heard Ranch. Although Crook was the official bassist of Spiritbox, he did not record any bass parts for the record; Stringer played them instead. Crook did record some backing-vocal performances. Eternal Blue was recorded over three weeks in February and the process was finished on March 1.

== Composition ==
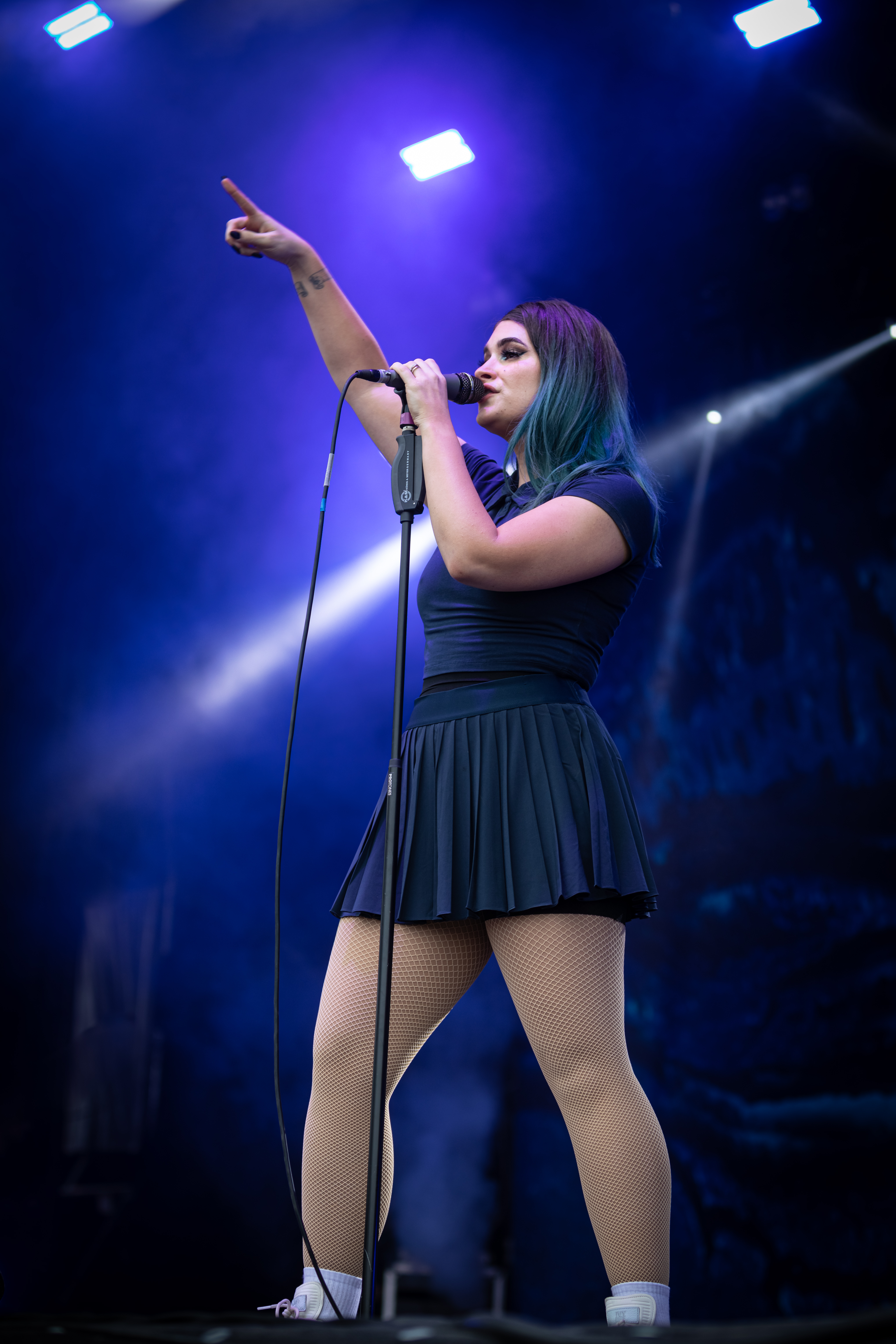
Courtney LaPlante's songwriting on Eternal Blue was inspired by personal frustrations and insecurities.

Spiritbox used several heavy metal–based musical styles on Eternal Blue; although LaPlante defined Spiritbox as a metalcore band, critics have described the album as metalcore, progressive metal, djent, post-metal, and alternative metal. (Note: The album has been categorized under several genres by different publications: "metalcore"; "progressive metal"; "djent"; "post-metal"; "alternative metal") Metal Hammer labelled the record "post-metalcore" while Allmusic described it as a "nu-metal-meets-djent riff-fest". Alluding to the difficulty in assigning specific metal labels to the album, Metal Injection said, "Eternal Blue is what metal sounds like in 2021. No add-ons required." Digital synthesizer is prominently used on Eternal Blue, showcasing sounds ranging from atmospheric to industrial. This approach led Guitar World to describe Spiritbox as "digitally infused metal".

The group said they were inspired by the 1980s pop music scene, Nine Inch Nails, and early post-punk bands such as the Cure during the album's production. Minimalist, "airy" song structures that are characteristic of 1980s dark rock are also an important base to the music on Eternal Blue. According to Stringer, the band disregarded genres during the making of the album and focused on what they enjoyed playing, adding: " ... the whole time, we were just thinking, 'Who cares if this song is similar to a Billie Eilish song and this song is the heaviest song we've ever done outside of 'Holy Roller'? It doesn't matter, it all belongs in the same body of work.'"

LaPlante both screams and sings throughout Eternal Blue. Stringer admitted he had often played a "dissonant, spastic, crazy, 'how many notes can you fit in a riff?' style of music" in his previous bands, and made a concerted effort with Spiritbox to diversify his approach into a more mature one which yielded more memorable tracks rather than a small portion of a song, whether atmospheric or heavy in nature. Stringer stated Spiritbox's music was often played in drop F#, and was occasionally recorded in lower tunings, but never higher. Tunings sometimes frequently changed in a single song; on "Holy Roller", tunings were changed four times through the use of a pitch shifter.

LaPlante, who wrote most of the lyrics on Eternal Blue, explored themes of frustration and sadness. She told Exclaim! that she usually feels more comfortable writing about "the things that upset me or make me feel self-conscious and insecure in metaphor". The album and its title track take their name from EternalBlue, a computer exploit the United States' National Security Agency (NSA) developed. While cybersecurity is not one of the album's themes, LaPlante used the term to refer to the mood of the album's content.

=== Songs ===
The opening track of Eternal Blue, "Sun Killer", was written in January 2020. The song creates a dramatic atmosphere LaPlante envisioned as ideal for a band's entrance to a live show, and in the same way was chosen to open the album. "Hurt You", which was also written in early 2020 prior to the COVID-19 pandemic, is a nu metal song that explores how it feels to stay in a doomed romantic relationship that is riddled with "toxic co-dependency". According to LaPlante, the song's working title was "Heavy Clown", a reference to Shawn "Clown" Crahan of the nu metal band Slipknot and an allusion to the song's lyrical "nu metal references".

LaPlante described "Yellowjacket" as "inhumanly heavy"; throughout the song, her vocal performance alternates between her "scariest" screams and normal speech. The use of speech was inspired by the works of 1990s alternative rock bands, such as Butthole Surfers, who used the technique. "Yellowjacket" contains a performance from the vocalist Sam Carter of Architects, which is the only guest appearance on the record. LaPlante initially did not want any guests to appear on the album, citing travel difficulties during the pandemic and a desire to prove herself as a capable vocalist without outside exposure. During the project's recording sessions, Carter contacted Spiritbox and offered to feature on a song, which became "Yellowjacket".

According to LaPlante, "The Summit" is an attempt to bend musical genres in a way "that doesn't make sense"; she found defining the song as heavy metal was difficult. Her vocal performance took inspiration from the music of Charli XCX and the Weeknd. In an interview with the Michigan Daily, Stringer named "The Summit" as his favourite song on Eternal Blue, highlighting its catchiness. "Secret Garden", which was written in mid-2019, showcases what LaPlante called the "fluidity that is inherent in heavy music" and the diverse metal styles of Spiritbox. LaPlante noted the distinction of "Secret Garden" as "just one part of a full body of work that may not sound exactly like this song". She highlighted how the band took influences from the music of Deftones in the "romantically sorrowful" song; its working name was "Chino", referencing Deftones' frontman Chino Moreno.

"Silk in the Strings", a more-intense song, was created later in the writing process. LaPlante was initially unsure how to proceed with the song after Stringer showed her the musical concept; for her vocal performance, LaPlante embraced a rapper's perspective rather than one of a heavy metal frontwoman, imagining how Wu-Tang Clan would rhythmically approach the song. In "Holy Roller", LaPlante takes the role of the Christian Devil, speaking internally to the listener as a sort of personified evil. Kill Your Stereo journalist Alex Sievers described it as the band's heaviest song, "far darker and more violent" than any of their previous material. Stringer's performance on the song includes a pick-scrape technique that has been likened to the work of Gojira. The title track "Eternal Blue" was one of the first songs the band wrote for the album. Braunstein helped the band explore new wave influences on the track, among them Depeche Mode and Tears for Fears. The song's lyrics were inspired by LaPlante coming to terms with a difficult breakup of a friendship.

"We Live In a Strange World" was also written before the COVID-19 pandemic; the lyrics serve as LaPlante's anxiety about Spiritbox's growing recognition and her fear of failure. Likewise, "Halcyon" describes the pressure on her to be successful with her music. LaPlante felt it had a similarly dramatic atmosphere to "Sun Killer", though catchier. "Circle with Me" was the final song written for the album; it was completed in the recording studio. The song traces LaPlante's emotional journey from this anxiety to empowerment and self-confidence. Influenced by Evanescence and Tears for Fears, the song includes "breathy vocals" and melodies that mixing guitars with electronic instrumentation, contrasting with harsher parts and a breakdown. The closing track, "Constance", takes an ethereal approach to metal one critic described as "the polar opposite" of "Holy Roller". The song is dedicated to LaPlante's grandmother, Phyllis; because of the pandemic, LaPlante could not say a last goodbye to Phyllis before her death nor attend her funeral. The song's namesake is Constance, the grandmother of the music video's director, Dylan Hryciuk. Constance, to whom the video is dedicated, was in late stages of dementia at the time of its release.

== Release and promotion ==
On May 25, 2021, Spiritbox announced Eternal Blue would be released on September 17, 2021; in the 24 hours following the announcement, 6,500 vinyls of the album were pre-ordered. Spiritbox attempted to tour again in July 2021, supporting Limp Bizkit in the US; this tour was also cancelled after a few dates due to safety concerns involving the pandemic. This aborted tour caused the band many unexpected expenses. We Came as Romans waived rental charges for their lighting package. Although he had never met Spiritbox, Shinedown singer Brent Smith offered them $10,000 to cover costs, concerned that the band would collapse from the financial hardship.

With the exception of an appearance on the Coheed and Cambria-headlined S.S. Neverender cruise in October 2021, Spiritbox did not begin live performances in support of the album until 2022, when they were a special guest on Underoath's Voyeurist tour in February and March, joining Bad Omens and Stray from the Path. (Note: Initially, Every Time I Die was to join Underoath and Spiritbox on this tour but they disbanded in January 2022.) In May, it was announced Spiritbox had joined the second leg of Ghost's Imperatour alongside Mastodon through August and September 2022. Crook left Spiritbox shortly after the tour's announcement and was replaced by former As I Lay Dying bassist Josh Gilbert. Spiritbox played their first live show in the United Kingdom in June 2022 at Download Festival. The album's official headlining tour of the United States did not proceed until April 2023 with guests After the Burial and Intervals.

=== Singles ===
Spiritbox found critical and commercial success with "Holy Roller", which was released on July 3, 2020. The band worked with Revolver to premiere the single and an accompanying music video. The song debuted at number 25 on the US Billboard Hot Hard Rock Songs chart and rose to number 12 six months later. The song's original version spent seven weeks as number one on SiriusXM Liquid Metal's radio chart show Devil's Dozen, and the station's listeners deemed it the best song of 2020. In October, Spiritbox released a remix of "Holy Roller" that features Ryo Kinoshita of Crystal Lake. The remix spent five weeks at number two on Sirius XM Liquid Metal's Devil's Dozen. "Holy Roller" was later covered by a nine-year-old girl named Harper on the 17th season of America's Got Talent; the show's judges gave Harper a resounding positive reception and she performed the song live with the band in London.

On December 4, 2020, Spiritbox debuted the ballad "Constance", which earned Spiritbox further acclaim from critics and the metal community for showing the band's stylistic versatility. Loudwire cited the emotional resonance of "Constance" as an example of what made Spiritbox a "buzz-worthy" new band. The third single from Eternal Blue, "Circle With Me", was released on April 30, 2021, with its music video, directed by Orie McGinness. In mid-May, the single topped the US Billboard Hard Rock Digital Song Sales chart, reached number five on the US Hot Hard Rock Songs, number 12 on the US Rock Digital Song Sales, number 50 on the US Hot Rock & Alternative Songs, and number 71 on the US Digital Song Sales chart.

"Circle with Me" was followed by "Secret Garden" on May 25; the track peaked at number 34 on the US Billboard Mainstream Rock chart in mid-August. During the first week of August, "Constance" garnered enough public attention to stay at number one on the US Billboard Hard Rock Digital Song Sales chart and reach number 19 on the US Billboard Hot Hard Rock Songs. The album's final single, "Hurt You", was shared on August 20; Hryciuk again directed the music video. "Hurt You" charted at number 20 on the US Billboard Hot Hard Rock Songs in the week of September 4, 2021.

== Critical reception ==
Professional ratings
Aggregate scores
Source	Rating
Metacritic	84/100
Review scores
Source	Rating
AllMusic	3.5/5 stars
Kerrang!	5/5
Kill Your Stereo	75/100
Metal Hammer	4.5/5 stars
Metal Injection	10/10
New Noise Magazine	4/5 stars
Outburn	10/10
Sputnikmusic	4.1/5
Upset Magazine	4/5 stars
Wall of Sound	8.5/10

On Metacritic, a review aggregator site that compiles reviews from mainstream publications and assigns a weighted average score out of 100, Eternal Blue received a score of 84 based on four critic reviews. This score indicated "universal acclaim". Metal Injection's Max Morin hailed the album as a well-crafted metal recording whose quality is usually found in veterans in the heavy metal scene, as opposed to one who was just beginning their career. For Steven Loftin of Upset, Eternal Blue remained "simultaneously familiar and fresh", and Rock Sins' Simon Crampton found the album to be "self assured, emotionally enriching and musically diverse", noting the strength of Spiritbox's work was in mixing heavy and emotional tones. Wall of Sound reviewer Paul Brown likened listening to Eternal Blue to a musical journey, connecting with the emotions of the listener and taking them "on a journey of self-discovery, empathy and overcoming".

Several reviewers singled out specific songs. "Eternal Blue" and "Halcyon" were highlighted by Owen Morawitz at New Noise Magazine for their songwriting and musical versatility, which he cited as reasons the album could appeal even to the most skeptical listeners. Outburn's Nathan Katsiaficas also praised "Halcyon" for its turn from light to heavy, which he felt "encompasses the variety of dynamics" showcased on Eternal Blue. Calling the record a "modern metal masterpiece", he highlighted its songwriting and musicianship as key elements that make it an exciting listen from start to finish. Similarly, Kerrang! reviewer Steve Beebee noted the contrast of "dreamlike soundscapes" on "Secret Garden" and "The Summit" with the heaviness of "Silk in the Strings" and "Holy Roller". Comparing it to the works of Tesseract, Deftones, and Meshuggah, AllMusic's Neil Z. Yeung said fans of these bands would particularly appreciate tracks like "Circle with Me" and "Eternal Blue".

Alex Sievers of Kill Your Stereo found that Eternal Blue overused atmospheric effects, though he praised its diversity. The contrast between the brutality of "Holy Roller" and the cleaner, more atmospheric nature of "Constance" stood out to him, and he singled out "Secret Garden" as among the album's strongest tracks, particularly for its hook. Metal Hammer's Dannii Leivers noted that, while Spiritbox's combination of heavier and gentler sounds was not a new concept, the material on Eternal Blue carries an emotional tone that improves its appeal. She concluded: "Eternal Blue is a staggeringly brilliant record that resoundingly delivers on the hype". Sputnikmusic's Robert Garland, though impressed with the album, noted that Spiritbox had room to grow despite their success.

Eternal Blue was frequently ranked among 2021's best heavy metal and hard rock albums, usually being at either number one or two on year-end lists pertaining to the genre in one way or another. Among the publications that placed the album on top was Loudwire, who also ranked "Circle With Me" as the second-best metal song of the year. The all-genre music publication Exclaim! of the group's native Canada ranked Eternal Blue the tenth best album of 2021, while Guitar World ranked it the year's 13th-best guitar album.

== Commercial performance ==
Eternal Blue entered the Billboard 200 chart at number 13 with 23,000 album-equivalent units earned in the United States, of which 19,000 were pure album sales, in the tracking period September 17–23. The album ranked third on the Top Album Sales chart in the week ending October 2, 2021. The album debuted in the top-20 in Australia, Germany, and the UK, where it was in the top-ten of the chart's mid-week equivalent at number eight. Eternal Blue was especially an indie chart success, reaching number two on the Independent Albums chart and number 12 on the Tastemaker Albums chart, which was later named the Indie Store Album Sales chart. Of all mediums, it did the best on vinyl, topping vinyl charts in Australia and the United States and almost doing so in the UK. By March 2025, Eternal Blue had sold 230,000 album-equivalent units in the United States, and approximately 24,000 copies in the United Kingdom.

== Track listing ==
All lyrics are written by Courtney LaPlante; all music is composed by Spiritbox.

Eternal Blue track listing
No.	Title	Length
1.	"Sun Killer"	3:47
2.	"Hurt You"	3:46
3.	"Yellowjacket" (featuring Sam Carter)	3:18
4.	"The Summit"	3:57
5.	"Secret Garden"	3:39
6.	"Silk in the Strings"	2:57
7.	"Holy Roller"	2:53
8.	"Eternal Blue"	3:59
9.	"We Live in a Strange World"	2:48
10.	"Halcyon"	3:40
11.	"Circle with Me"	3:53
12.	"Constance"	4:30
Total length:		43:07

== Personnel ==
Credits are adapted from the album's liner notes.

Spiritbox

- Courtney LaPlante – lead vocals
- Michael Stringer – guitar, bass, drums, background vocals (tracks 2, 3, 6, 11)
- Zev Rosenberg – drums
- Bill Crook – background vocals (tracks 2–5, 9–12)

Additional musicians

- Daniel Braunstein – drums
- Sam Carter – additional vocals (track 3)

Production

- Daniel Braunstein – production, engineering, mixing
- Michael Stringer – co-production
- Jens Bogren – mastering

Design

- Kevin Moore – art direction, design at Soft Surrogate

== Charts ==
=== Weekly charts ===
Weekly chart performance for Eternal Blue
Chart (2021)	Peak position
Australian Albums (ARIA)	8
Belgian Albums (Ultratop Flanders)	144
Canadian Albums (Billboard)	17
Finnish Albums (Suomen virallinen lista)	40
German Albums (Offizielle Top 100)	17
Scottish Albums (Official Charts)	8
UK Albums (Official Charts)	19
UK Rock & Metal Albums (Official Charts)	2
US Billboard 200	13
US Independent Albums (Billboard)	2
US Top Hard Rock Albums (Billboard)	1
US Top Rock Albums (Billboard)	1

=== Year-end charts ===
Year-end chart performance for Eternal Blue
Chart (2021)	Position
US Top Current Album Sales (Billboard)	137
US Top Hard Rock Albums (Billboard)	50
