= Courtney LaPlante =

American singer (born 1989)

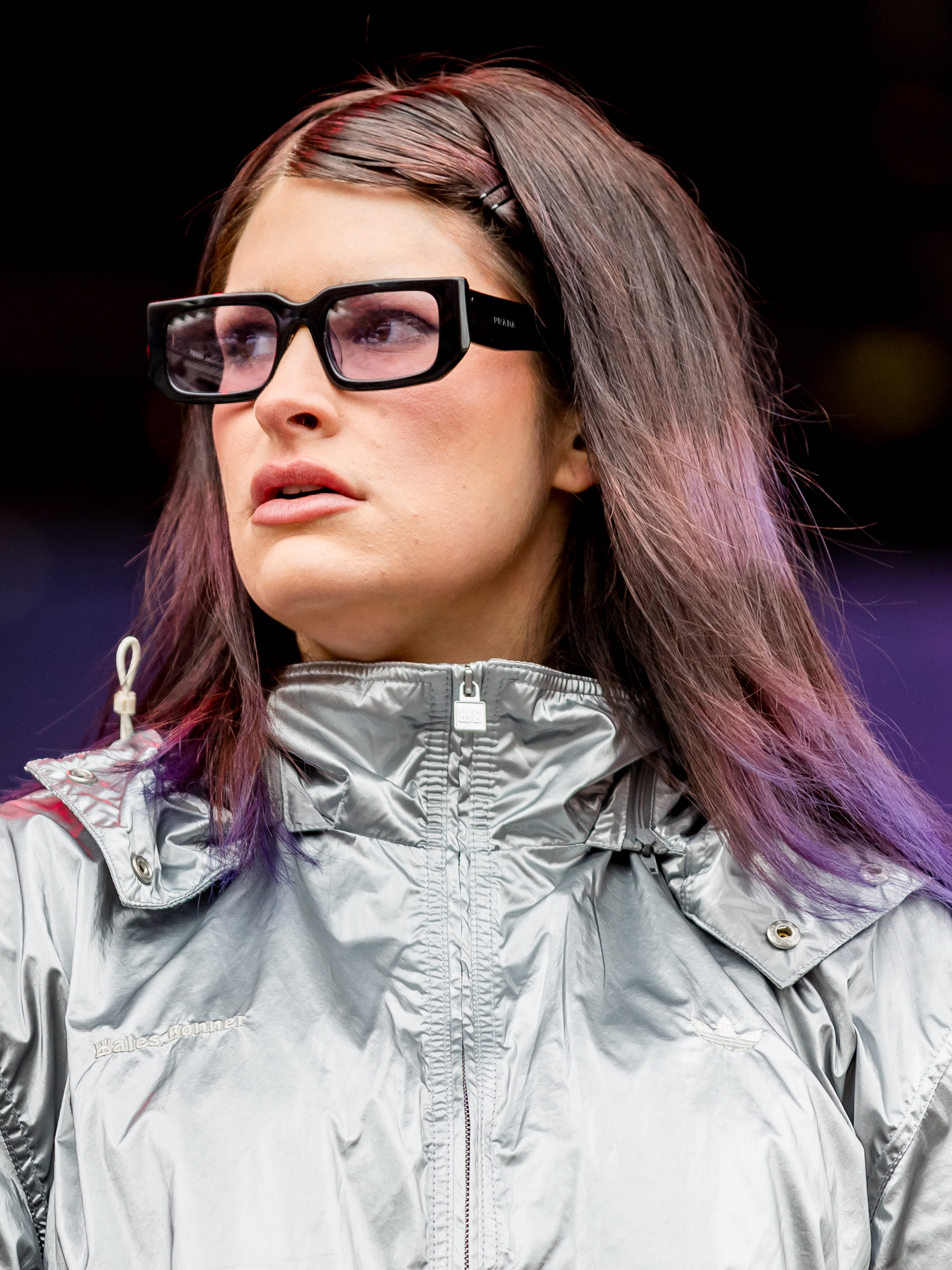
- LaPlante in 2024

Background information
- Born: February 26, 1989 (age 37); Bangor, Maine, U.S.
- Origin: Victoria, British Columbia, Canada
- Genres: Metalcore; progressive metal; djent; alternative metal; mathcore
- Occupations: Singer; songwriter
- Years active: 2007–present
- Member of: Spiritbox
- Formerly of: Iwrestledabearonce; Unicron
- Spouse: Michael Stringer (m. 2016)

Courtney LaPlante (born February 26, 1989) is an American singer best known as the lead vocalist of the Canadian heavy metal band Spiritbox. Born in the United States, LaPlante began singing in bands as a teenager after moving to Canada. She first gained success as the lead singer of the now-defunct American metalcore band Iwrestledabearonce. As the successor of the band's original vocalist, LaPlante recorded and performed with the band from 2012 until 2015. She left the group months after the release of her second album with them, Hail Mary (2015).

In 2016, LaPlante returned to Canada with longtime bandmate Mike Stringer, where the two married; they have played together in each of LaPlante's bands. Desiring to have their own creative identity following their experience in Iwrestledabearonce, the pair founded Spiritbox in 2017. They have released two studio albums, Eternal Blue (2021), Tsunami Sea (2025), and several extended plays.

In 2023, Jake Richardson of Loudwire included her in his list of the "10 Best Clean Singers in Metalcore". In 2025, Stephen Andrew Galiher of Vice included her in his list of "4 Metal Vocalists Who Mastered Both Screaming and Singing".

== Early life and career beginnings ==
Courtney LaPlante was born on February 26, 1989, in Bangor, Maine. She grew up with her parents as the eldest of six children, among them a younger brother and fellow musician, Jackson. Her father was a college basketball coach, and her mother was a teacher. The LaPlante family moved to Alabama when Courtney was six. Growing up as part of the Catholic Church while living there, her family was considered unusual among the predominantly Protestant South. This led to her switching over to the Methodist Church, where she enjoyed singing rock-oriented music as opposed to what she was accustomed to in the Catholic Church. She first attended the Methodist Church around the age of 14 with her then-boyfriend, and realized that she "really liked people clapping and her performing" rather than the core of the religion, though she remains "fascinated by all religion or spirituality".

At the age of 15, following her parents' divorce, LaPlante relocated with her mother to Victoria, British Columbia, nearly 2,800 miles northwest of her Jacksonville, Alabama home. Before fame, LaPlante had regular employments as a barista, a payroll clerk and a receptionist.

LaPlante's musical career began at the age of 18, when she and Jackson formed the metal band Unicron. The group started by playing music inspired by Rage Against the Machine which resulted in a sound similar to their spinoff Audioslave, but gradually gravitated toward progressive metalcore, influenced by the likes of Protest the Hero and Between the Buried and Me. It was during a show that Unicron shared with fellow Victoria-based metal band Fall in Archaea that LaPlante met their guitarist, Mike Stringer. The LaPlante siblings were impressed with Stringer's ability; after the demise of Fall of Archaea, the two recruited Stringer to play for Unicron. LaPlante and Stringer eventually formed a romantic relationship, and they became engaged around 2012. They originally planned to be married shortly thereafter, but the plan was put off for some time after LaPlante joined Iwrestledabearonce, and Stringer eventually followed her into the band. After the two left the band in 2015, they would be married in 2016. For wedding presents, the couple asked for funding for their musical endeavors, which would later become Spiritbox.

== Career ==
=== Iwrestledabearonce (2012–2015) ===
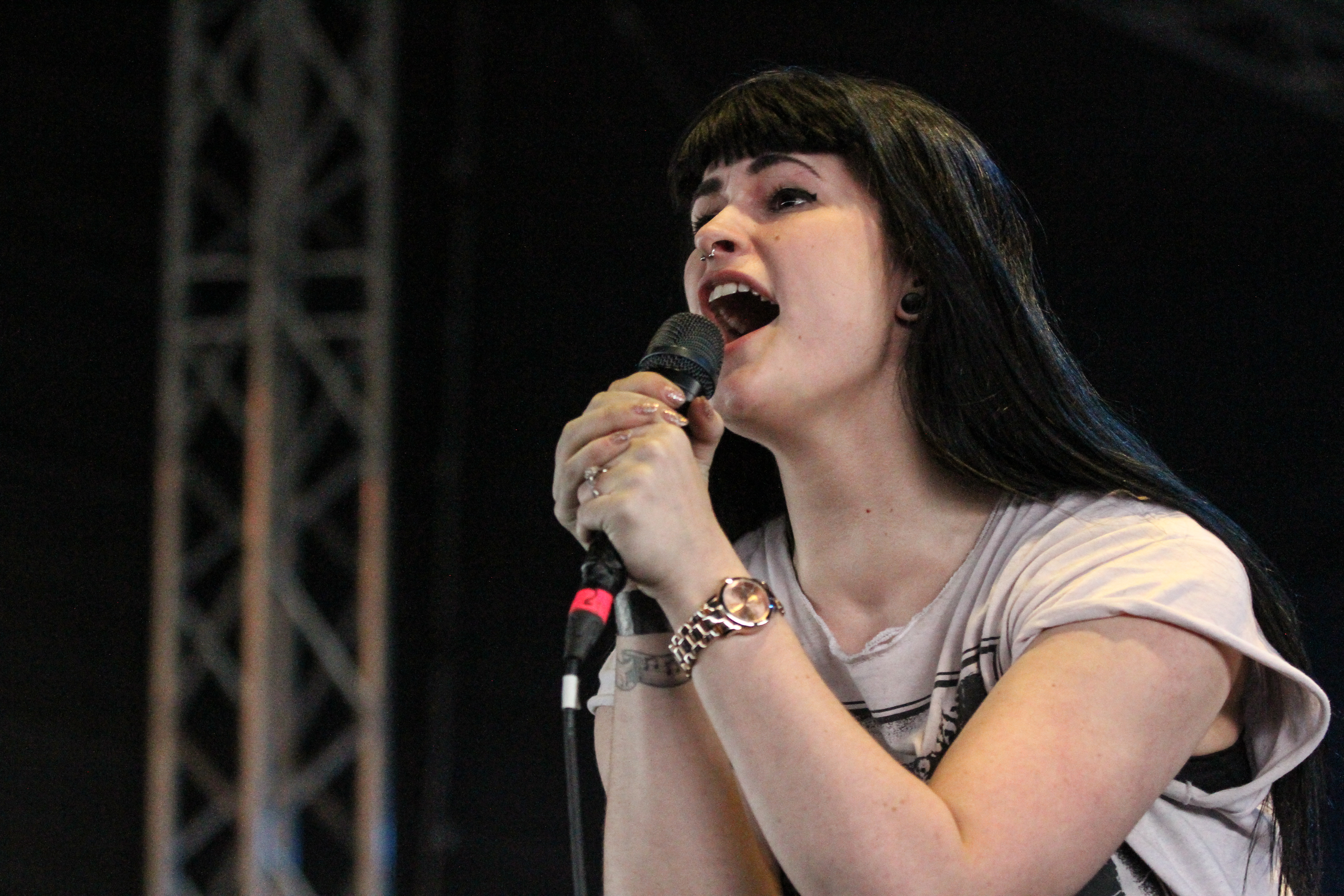
LaPlante performing with Iwrestledabearonce in 2013

Steven Bradley, guitarist of the Louisiana-based metalcore band Iwrestledabearonce, announced in 2012 that the band's vocalist Krysta Cameron was pregnant, and had thus abruptly departed from the band. The group was in Dallas, Texas for a show on the 2012 Warped Tour. A Warped Tour representative suggested LaPlante, and they reached out to her to ask for her to replace Cameron. LaPlante quickly flew from Canada to perform the next day. Although she was a fan of the band and the announcement had addressed her as the band's "friend", she and the band had never met or even spoken to each other prior to Cameron's departure, though several of the band's peers had shown her work in Unicron to them, likening it to Iwrestledabearonce. Though she knew few of the lyrics to the band's songs at first, she would go on to play with the band for the rest of the tour, and joined the band officially later that year.

Sometime after LaPlante's first album with the band, Late for Nothing (2013), Stringer joined his partner in the band. Stringer played in place of previous guitarist John Ganey during the production of Hail Mary (2015), though Ganey's formal departure was never announced. In 2015, with two weeks of tour left, the couple decided to quit the band after completing their touring commitment. LaPlante and Stringer were no longer comfortable being the "replacement people" for the original members before them, and also desired to pursue a new creative direction. No announcement by Iwrestledabearonce was ever made on the couple's departure, and the band has remained inactive since.

=== Spiritbox (2017–present) ===
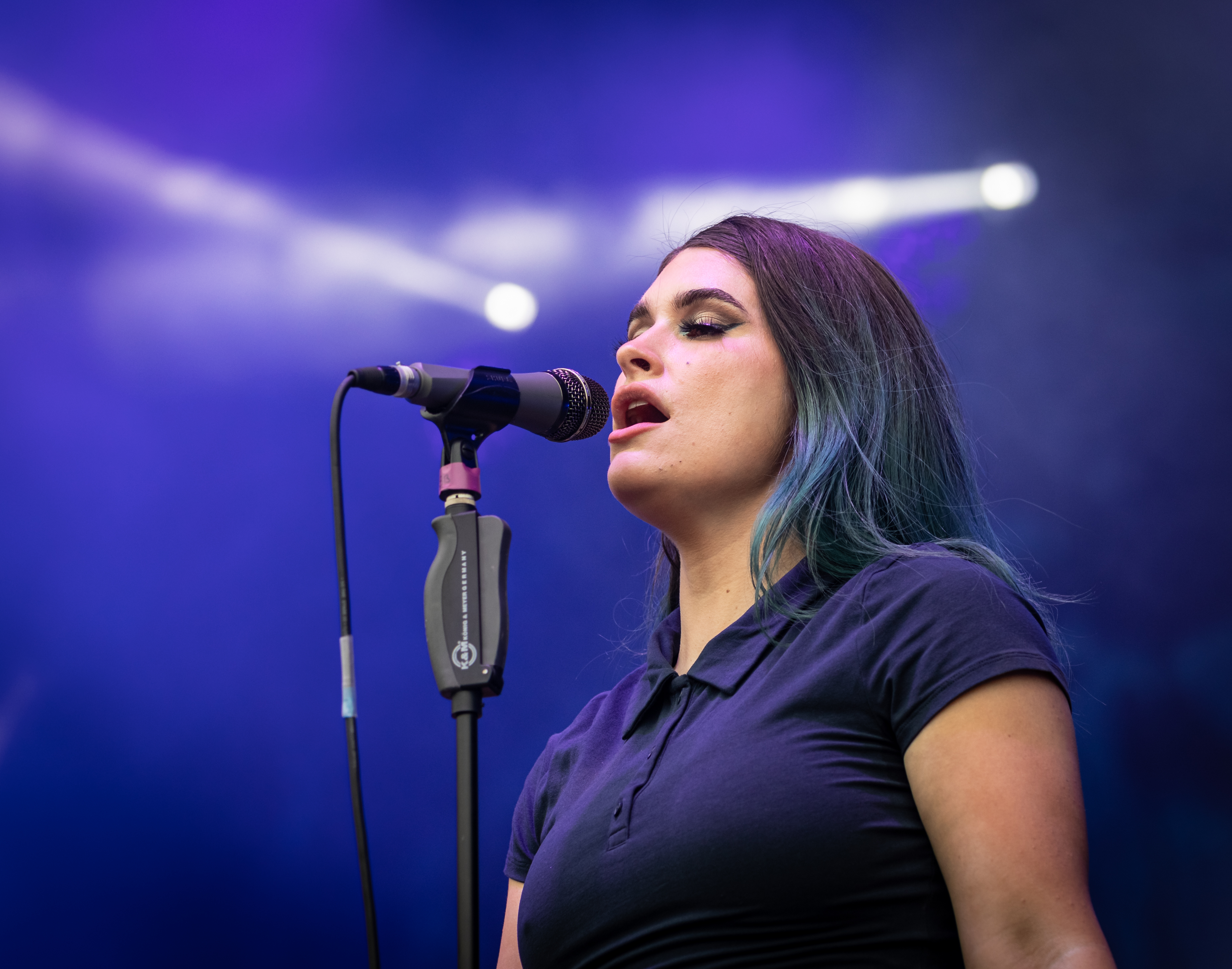
LaPlante performing with Spiritbox in 2022

LaPlante and Stringer got married in 2016, and two weeks after the wedding, they began investing their money into recording songs for a new project. In the interim, the two returned to find regular employment; at first, LaPlante served as a waitress, while Stringer delivered pizzas. The two would later work together as data entry clerks. The project was paused while the band struggled to get signed to a record label for tour funding. On October 9, 2017, the husband and wife duo announced the launch of their band, named Spiritbox. The couple based the band in their hometown of Victoria. The band released their first full-length album, Eternal Blue, in September 2021 to very positive critical acclaim. During the 67th Annual Grammy Awards, LaPlante became the subject of a series of memes when Grammy reporters mistook her for fellow Best Metal Performance nominee, Poppy. Instead of trying to correct the reporters, LaPlante decided to go along with the interview as Poppy. The band released their second full-length album, Tsunami Sea in March 2025.

== Musical style ==
LaPlante's goal for her band, Spiritbox, is to have a fluid, variable sound. She has cited Tesseract, Deftones, Kate Bush, Tool, and Amy Lee as influences; though Meshuggah is her leading example in heavy metal as a whole. She has also expressed admiration for Gojira, Björk, Beyoncé, and FKA Twigs.

LaPlante's first experience with the death growl came from listening to Cannibal Corpse at the age of five, which developed into a marked interest in harsh vocals during her early adolescence while listening to nu metal. At the age of eighteen, LaPlante laid down her screamed vocals for the first time on a breakdown of a song written by her brother. She said that it is necessary to push the boundaries of the metalcore genre by bringing modernity and diversity of vocal styles to stay relevant. Her vocal phrasing based on her musical expression, primarily rooted in contemporary R&B, would become a distinctive feature; she credits Doja Cat, H.E.R., SZA, and the Weeknd as influences to her clean singing. LaPlante's singing has received acclaim from music critics. Metal Injection's Max Morin hailed her as "one of the best vocalists in the modern metal scene", and Sam Coare of Kerrang! lauded the "skill, depth and ferocity" of LaPlante's ability to transition between growls and singing.

== Discography ==
=== Unicron ===
- Powerbomb (EP) (2010)
- "Homecoming" (single, 2011)
- "Shinigami" (single, 2011)
- "Broken Vessels" (single, 2012)

=== Iwrestledabearonce ===
- Late for Nothing (2013)
- Hail Mary (2015)

=== Spiritbox ===
- Spiritbox (EP) (2017)
- Singles Collection (EP) (2019)
- Eternal Blue (2021)
- Rotoscope (EP) (2022)
- The Fear of Fear (EP) (2023)
- Tsunami Sea (2025)

=== As featured artist ===
Year	Title	Artist
2013	"Motive"	Fall In Archaea
2015	"Bright Side"	Make Me a Donut
2016	"Derelict"	Elegies for a Dead Man
2017	"P$W"	CoaastGxd
2017	"We All Have Nothing"	Buried Above Ground
2018	"Shadow King"	Galactic Pegasus
2018	"Knife After Dark"	Dredge the Lake
2018	"The Oracle"	Placidic Arcana
2018	"Revanant"	Paperhouse
	"Adhyasa"	Contrvdicted
2019	"Rewind"	Tuonela
2019	"Derealization"	Mindful
2019	"Shattered Moon"	Before I Turn
2019	"Gutter" (featuring Courtney LaPlante and Whitney Peyton)	Dead Rabbitts
2020	"Milieu"	Gavin Crump
2020	"You're Making a Joke"	Nomvdic
2020	"One Thousand Painful Stings"	The Acacia Strain
2020	"Mother"	ovEnola
2020	"Counter Clock"	Endvade
2020	"The Ride"	Kingdom of Giants
2020	"Hypnos"	Daze of June
2020	"A Much Needed Death"	Variant
2020	"Killing In The Name" (featuring Marcus Bridge, Courtney LaPlante, Tyler Tate, Jared Dines, Michael Martenson, Nathan Kane, Linzey Rae, Jake Impellizzeri, David Thompson)	CrazyEightEight
2020	"Remain" (featuring Jose Macario, Matt Heafy, Courtney LaPlante)	Revolucíon
2021	"Despondent"	Eternal Void
2021	"Daniel" (featuring Courtney LaPlante and Jonny Reeves)	Darko US
2021	"The Land of Nod"	Scale the Summit
2021	"Contraband"	Make Them Suffer
2021	"In Another Life"	Crown the Empire
2021	"Vanish Canvas"	Erra
2023	"Cobra (Rock Remix)"	Megan Thee Stallion
2023	"Grievance" (featuring Courtney LaPlante, Andy Brown)	Deceitful By Nature
2024	"To the Dance Floor for Shelter"	SeeYouSpaceCowboy
2024	"Parasite"	GrayWeather
2024	"TYG"	Megan Thee Stallion
	"Bitter Nothing - 444hz"	Lest I Sleep
2025	"My House (New Version)"	Pvris
2025	"End of You" (featuring Courtney LaPlante and Amy Lee)	Poppy
2025	"Ties That Bind"	2XKO (Joe Ford)
2026	"Under My Skin" (featuring Courtney LaPlante, Vestige)	Slander
2026	"If the Sun Burns out Tonight" (featuring Grabbitz, Oli Sykes and Courtney LaPlante)	Valorant
