= List of Rock Band Network 1.0 songs =

The Rock Band Network in the music video games Rock Band 2 and Rock Band 3 supports downloadable songs for the Xbox 360, PlayStation 3, and Wii versions through the consoles' respective online services. The Rock Band Network Store became publicly available on March 4, 2010, for all Xbox 360 players in selected countries (US, Canada, UK, France, Italy, Germany, Spain, Sweden, and Singapore). Rock Band Network songs became available on the PlayStation 3 in five song intervals through their own Rock Band Network Store on April 22, 2010. Starting on April 12, 2011, up to 10 songs were added weekly to the PlayStation 3 platform until June 14, 2011, when it reverted to five song intervals. Also, starting on June 14, 2011, PlayStation 3 Rock Band Network songs will only be compatible with Rock Band 3. Rock Band Network became available on the Wii in six to 10 song intervals from September 7, 2010 to January 18, 2011. Rock Band Network songs will be exclusive to the Xbox 360 for 30 days, after which a selection of songs will be made available on the PlayStation 3 and Wii. As of January 18, 2011, no further Rock Band Network songs will be released on the Wii platform due to Nintendo's small online install base, limited demand for the songs and the significant amount of work each song needs to convert to the Wii.

Players can download songs (and free demos of the songs if being used on the Xbox 360) on a track-by-track basis. Unlike a song released through the regular music store, there are limitations to where the song can be used. Network songs will not appear as a song within the various "Mystery Setlist" challenges within Tour mode (except on Wii, where they are treated as regular DLC), though users can add Network songs to "Make a Setlist". Users can also use Network songs in Quickplay modes. Network songs cannot be played in the head-to-head modes, as this would require Network authors to also balance note tracks for these game modes. Songs can be practiced through Practice Mode, but unlike Harmonix-authored songs, which include hooks to allow the user to practice specific sections of a song, Network songs are not authored with these phrase hooks and can only be practiced in percentage based segments (i.e. short songs would get 10% increments, longer would get 5%, etc.).

With the release of Rock Band Network 2.0, creators can now add songs with harmony vocals, standard and pro mode keyboard tracks, and pro drum tracks, as well as mark specific sections for practicing and the end-of-song breakdown. Support for pro guitar and bass is not included in RBN 2.0 due to the complexity of authoring such tracks and the small base of pro guitar users/testers early on. With the formal launch of RBN 2.0 on February 15, 2011, the previous version of the network was shut down, ending RBN support for Rock Band 2.

== Pricing ==
Prices for Rock Band Network songs are set by the parties involved with authoring and submitting the song, and can be set at either US$1.00, $1.99, or $2.99. The artist retains 30% of this cost, with the remaining 70% of each sale split between Harmonix and Microsoft (although the exact ratios of that distribution are unknown).

== Complete list of available songs ==
The following songs have been released to the Rock Band Network 1.0. RBN 1.0 songs are playable in Rock Band 2 and Rock Band 3, while RBN 2.0 songs are only available in Rock Band 3. All songs can only be released individually. All songs use the song's master recording. New songs are released every day exclusively for Xbox Live for 30 days. After 30 days, songs are eligible to be brought over to the Wii and PlayStation 3. Dates listed are the initial release of songs on Xbox Live. Starting March 4, 2010, all downloadable songs are available in US, Canada, UK, France, Italy, Germany, Spain, Sweden, and Singapore, unless noted. All songs are capable of being changed or removed at any time.

Song title	Artist	Decade	Genre	Release date (Xbox 360)	Release date (PlayStation 3)	Release date (Wii)
"A Drug Against War"	KMFDM	1990s	Metal	Mar 4, 2010	Nov 9, 2010	Jan 4, 2011
"Angel Lust"	Fake Shark – Real Zombie!	2000s	Alternative	Mar 4, 2010	Mar 15, 2011	No
"Another California Song"	Zack Wilson	2000s	Rock	Mar 4, 2010	No	No
"Arigato"	Gandhi	2000s	Rock	Mar 4, 2010	No	No
"Australia" (Note: Song was later included as Rock Band 4 official DLC.)	The Shins	2000s	Indie Rock	Mar 4, 2010	Apr 22, 2010	Oct 5, 2010
"Backyard Buildyard"	Steve and Lindley Band	2000s	Indie Rock	Mar 4, 2010	No	No
"Battles and Brotherhood"	3 Inches of Blood	2000s	Metal	Mar 4, 2010	Jul 6, 2010	Nov 9, 2010
"Buried Cold"	Rose of Jericho	2000s	Pop-Rock	Mar 4, 2010	Mar 15, 2011	No
"Burn It Down"	Five Finger Death Punch	2000s	Metal	Mar 4, 2010	Apr 29, 2010	Sep 21, 2010
"California"	The Kimberly Trip	2000s	Pop-Rock	Mar 4, 2010	No	No
"Can I Stay"	Stephanie Hatfield and Hot Mess	2000s	Rock	Mar 4, 2010	Jun 2, 2011	No
"Cease and Desist"	The Main Drag	2000s	Indie Rock	Mar 4, 2010	No	No
"Children of December"	The Slip	2000s	Rock	Mar 4, 2010	Dec 14, 2010	No
"Creepy Doll"	Jonathan Coulton	2000s	Rock	Mar 4, 2010	Jun 22, 2010	Sep 28, 2010
"Crushed Beyond Dust"	Skeletonwitch	2000s	Metal	Mar 4, 2010	Aug 3, 2010	Oct 5, 2010
"Day of Mourning"	Despised Icon	2000s	Metal	Mar 4, 2010	Jun 15, 2010	Oct 12, 2010
"Disengage"	Suicide Silence	2000s	Metal	Mar 4, 2010	Jun 1, 2010	Oct 19, 2010
"Don't Let Me Down (Slowly)"	The Main Drag	2000s	Indie Rock	Mar 4, 2010	Jun 8, 2010	Jan 11, 2011
"Dove Nets"	The Main Drag	2000s	Indie Rock	Mar 4, 2010	Jun 2, 2011	No
"Drunken Lullabies (Live)"	Flogging Molly	2010s	Punk	Mar 4, 2010	Apr 22, 2010	Oct 5, 2010
"End Quote"	Full-Source	2000s	New Wave	Mar 4, 2010	No	No
"Even Rats"	The Slip	2000s	Rock	Mar 4, 2010	Apr 22, 2010	Oct 5, 2010
"Fade Away"	Of Last Resort	2000s	Rock	Mar 4, 2010	No	No
"Far Away from Heaven"	Free Spirit	2000s	Rock	Mar 4, 2010	Jun 3, 2011	No
"Fight Back"	Ron Wasserman	2010s	Rock	Mar 4, 2010	No	No
"Footloose and Fancy Free"	Bill Bruford's Earthworks	2000s	Jazz	Mar 4, 2010	No	No
"For the Love of God (Live)"	Steve Vai	2000s	Rock	Mar 4, 2010	Apr 22, 2010	Oct 5, 2010
"Fortune"	Kristin Hersh	2010s	Indie Rock	Mar 4, 2010	No	No
"Get the Hell Out of Here"	Steve Vai	2000s	Rock	Mar 4, 2010	Jun 1, 2010	Oct 19, 2010
"Give"	The Cold Goodnight	2000s	Alternative	Mar 4, 2010	No	No
"Goth Girls"	MC Frontalot	2000s	Other	Mar 4, 2010	Jul 27, 2010	Sep 28, 2010
"Grumpytown"	Speck	2000s	Emo	Mar 4, 2010	No	No
"He Sleeps in a Grove"	Amberian Dawn	2000s	Metal	Mar 4, 2010	May 18, 2010	Sep 21, 2010
"Heimdalsgate Like a Promethean Curse"	of Montreal	2000s	Indie Rock	Mar 4, 2010	Jun 8, 2010	Oct 26, 2010
"Homosuperior"	The Main Drag	2000s	Indie Rock	Mar 4, 2010	Jun 2, 2011	No
"Horses in Heaven"	Fake Shark – Real Zombie!	2000s	Alternative	Mar 4, 2010	No	No
"How We'd Look on Paper"	The Main Drag	2000s	Indie Rock	Mar 4, 2010	Oct 26, 2010	Jan 18, 2011
"Hyperbole"	Glass Hammer	2000s	Prog	Mar 4, 2010	No	No
"Icarus' Song"	Furly	2000s	Rock	Mar 4, 2010	Aug 10, 2010	Nov 9, 2010
"If Not Now When"	Color Theory	2000s	Other	Mar 4, 2010	No	No
"If Trucks Drank Beer"	Error 404 feat. CJ Watson	2000s	Country	Mar 4, 2010	No	No
"Ikea"	Jonathan Coulton	2000s	Rock	Mar 4, 2010	Jun 15, 2010	Oct 12, 2010
"In Memories"	Giant Target	2000s	Punk	Mar 4, 2010	No	No
"Inside Out"	Nick Gallant	2000s	Alternative	Mar 4, 2010	No	No
"It's Good"	The Humans	2000s	Rock	Mar 4, 2010	No	No
"It's Not You, It's Everyone"	Full-Source	2000s	New Wave	Mar 4, 2010	No	No
"Juke Joint Jezebel"	KMFDM	1990s	Metal	Mar 4, 2010	May 25, 2010	Oct 19, 2010
"Kick Some Ass '09"	Stroke 9	2010s	Rock	Mar 4, 2010	Jun 29, 2010	Oct 26, 2010
"Lady in a Blue Dress"	Senses Fail	2000s	Rock	Mar 4, 2010	Apr 29, 2010	Sep 21, 2010
"Lemon Juice"	Scratching the Itch	2000s	Rock	Mar 4, 2010	No	No
"Lilith in Libra"	You Shriek	2000s	New Wave	Mar 4, 2010	No	No
"Limousine"	Stars of Boulevard	2000s	Rock	Mar 4, 2010	No	No
"Liquid Smog (StompBox Remix)"	WaveGroup feat. Becca Neun	2000s	Rock	Mar 4, 2010	No	No
"Little Black Backpack '09"	Stroke 9	2010s	Rock	Mar 4, 2010	May 4, 2010	Sep 7, 2010
"Liverpool Judies"	The Fisticuffs	2000s	Punk	Mar 4, 2010	No	No
"Love During Wartime"	The Main Drag	2000s	Indie Rock	Mar 4, 2010	Apr 12, 2011	No
"Mechanical Love"	In This Moment	2000s	Metal	Mar 4, 2010	Jun 8, 2010	Oct 26, 2010
"Megatron"	The Main Drag	2000s	Indie Rock	Mar 4, 2010	Jun 2, 2011	No
"Mississippi Kite"	Kristin Hersh	2010s	Indie Rock	Mar 4, 2010	No	No
"Moonboy"	The Dirty Love Band	2010s	Rock	Mar 4, 2010	No	No
"Nancy Drew"	Pink Flag	2000s	Punk	Mar 4, 2010	No	No
"No Direction"	Longwave	2000s	Alternative	Mar 4, 2010	Feb 8, 2011	No
"No Heroes"	You Shriek	2010s	New Wave	Mar 4, 2010	No	No
"Not My Fault"	Ultra Saturday	2010s	Punk	Mar 4, 2010	No	No
"Ox"	Zack Wilson	2010s	Rock	Mar 4, 2010	No	No
"Paper Valentines"	James William Roy	2010s	Indie Rock	Mar 4, 2010	No	No
"Parhelia"	Heaven Ablaze	2000s	Metal	Mar 4, 2010	Oct 12, 2010	Nov 23, 2010
"Persistence of Vision"	Matter in the Medium	2000s	Prog	Mar 4, 2010	Jun 2, 2011	No
"Race The Hourglass"	Audio Fiction	2000s	Rock	Mar 4, 2010	No	No
"Red Sky At Morn"	Full-Source	2000s	Other	Mar 4, 2010	No	No
"Requiem for a Dying Song"	Flogging Molly	2000s	Punk	Mar 4, 2010	Jun 22, 2010	Sep 28, 2010
"Revengers"	Ron Wasserman	2010s	Rock	Mar 4, 2010	No	No
"Rip'er"	Lead the Dead	2000s	Metal	Mar 4, 2010	Oct 26, 2010	Dec 21, 2010
"River of Tuoni"	Amberian Dawn	2000s	Metal	Mar 4, 2010	Jul 27, 2010	Sep 28, 2010
"Running for the Razors"	Fake Shark – Real Zombie!	2000s	Alternative	Mar 4, 2010	No	No
"Rx"	Wounded Soul	2000s	Metal	Mar 4, 2010	Nov 30, 2010	Jan 18, 2011
"Sequestered in Memphis"	The Hold Steady	2000s	Indie Rock	Mar 4, 2010	May 18, 2010	Sep 21, 2010
"Sestri Levante"	Fake Shark – Real Zombie!	2000s	Alternative	Mar 4, 2010	No	No
"Sick"	Bif Naked	2000s	Rock	Mar 4, 2010	Jun 29, 2010	Oct 26, 2010
"Signs"	Giant Target	2000s	Punk	Mar 4, 2010	No	No
"Sissyfuss"	Surprise Me Mr. Davis	2000s	Rock	Mar 4, 2010	No	No
"Sleep On"	Glass Hammer	2000s	Prog	Mar 4, 2010	No	No
"Stand for Something"	Skindred	2000s	Metal	Mar 4, 2010	Jul 20, 2010	Nov 2, 2010
"Still There"	Bojibian	2000s	Indie Rock	Mar 4, 2010	No	No
"Superhero!"	Ultra Saturday	2000s	Punk	Mar 4, 2010	No	No
"Survive"	Lacuna Coil	2000s	Metal	Mar 4, 2010	May 4, 2010	Sep 7, 2010
"Tadpole Search and Rescue"	Chaunce DeLeon and the Fountain of Choof	2000s	Alternative	Mar 4, 2010	Jun 2, 2011	No
"Talk About"	Dear and the Headlights	2000s	Indie Rock	Mar 4, 2010	May 18, 2010	Sep 21, 2010
"Talk Them Down"	The Main Drag	2000s	Indie Rock	Mar 4, 2010	Jun 2, 2011	No
"Teeth, Face, Outerspace"	The Main Drag	2000s	Indie Rock	Mar 4, 2010	Jun 2, 2011	No
"The Attitude Song"	Steve Vai	1980s	Rock	Mar 4, 2010	Jun 15, 2010	Oct 12, 2010
"The Buddy Disease"	Scratching the Itch	2000s	Rock	Mar 4, 2010	No	No
"The Complexity of Light"	Children of Nova	2000s	Prog	Mar 4, 2010	May 25, 2010	Oct 19, 2010
"The Future Soon"	Jonathan Coulton	2000s	Rock	Mar 4, 2010	Jun 1, 2010	No
"The Heist"	DnA's Evolution	2000s	Rock	Mar 4, 2010	No	No
"Tongue Twister Typo"	Blackmarket	2010s	Alternative	Mar 4, 2010	May 12, 2010	Sep 14, 2010
"Top Back"	Alias Unknown	2000s	Urban	Mar 4, 2010	Jul 13, 2010	Nov 16, 2010
"Tricky Girl"	The Main Drag	2000s	Indie Rock	Mar 4, 2010	Jun 2, 2011	No
"Trippolette"	Andraleia Buch	2000s	Prog	Mar 4, 2010	Jul 13, 2010	No
"Turn Yourself Around"	Nick Gallant	2000s	Alternative	Mar 4, 2010	No	No
"VP of Booty Reports"	Speck	2000s	Pop-Rock	Mar 4, 2010	No	No
"Watch It All Go Down"	Foreword	2000s	Indie Rock	Mar 4, 2010	Jun 3, 2011	No
"We Are the Best"	C&O	2000s	Rock	Mar 4, 2010	No	No
"Whatever Is Wrong With You"	Marillion	2000s	Prog	Mar 4, 2010	Feb 8, 2011	No
"What's Your Favorite Dinosaur?"	The Main Drag	2000s	Indie Rock	Mar 4, 2010	Apr 12, 2011	No
"You Got That"	The Everybody	2000s	Indie Rock	Mar 4, 2010	No	No
"You're My Everything"	Scratching the Itch	2000s	New Wave	Mar 4, 2010	No	No
"Bleeder"	Alchemilla	2010s	Rock	Mar 5, 2010	No	No
"Cali Girl"	Ballyhoo!	2000s	Rock	Mar 5, 2010	Sep 28, 2010	Nov 16, 2010
"Code Monkey"	Jonathan Coulton	2000s	Rock	Mar 5, 2010	Apr 22, 2010	Oct 5, 2010
"Gave It Up"	Pollyn	2000s	Alternative	Mar 5, 2010	No	No
"Genius"	The B.O.L.T.	2000s	Indie Rock	Mar 5, 2010	Apr 19, 2011	No
"Makeup/Breakup (Original Version)"	Super Gravity	2000s	Rock	Mar 5, 2010	No	No
"Minnesota"	Voodoo Pharmacology	2010s	Indie Rock	Mar 5, 2010	No	No
"Packet Flier"	Terrorhorse	2000s	Metal	Mar 5, 2010	Sep 21, 2010	Nov 2, 2010
"Push Push (Lady Lightning)"	Bang Camaro	2000s	Rock	Mar 5, 2010	Apr 29, 2010	Sep 21, 2010
"Stegosaurus Song"	Eric Harm	2000s	Pop-Rock	Mar 5, 2010	No	No
"White Heat"	Cetan Clawson and the Soul Side	2000s	Blues	Mar 5, 2010	Dec 7, 2010	Jan 18, 2011
"Approach the Podium"	Winds of Plague	2000s	Metal	Mar 6, 2010	Jul 20, 2010	Nov 2, 2010
"Demon Woman"	Flight of the Conchords	2000s	Novelty	Mar 6, 2010	Jun 15, 2010	Oct 12, 2010
"Roll Over"	Uniform Motion	2010s	Indie Rock	Mar 6, 2010	No	No
"So Says I"	The Shins	2000s	Indie Rock	Mar 6, 2010	Jul 6, 2010	Oct 26, 2010
"Push Me"	The Carsitters	2000s	Rock	Mar 7, 2010	No	No
"Shiny Dark Bar"	James William Roy	2010s	Indie Rock	Mar 7, 2010	No	No
"Do You Feel Like Breaking Up?"	Mark Mallman	2000s	Indie Rock	Mar 8, 2010	No	No
"Mordecai"	Between the Buried and Me	2000s	Metal	Mar 8, 2010	May 12, 2010	Sep 14, 2010
"Stick Stickly"	Attack Attack!	2000s	Metal	Mar 8, 2010	Apr 29, 2010	Sep 21, 2010
"Africa"	Quartered	2000s	Prog	Mar 9, 2010	Sep 14, 2010	Oct 12, 2010
"Atomic"	Blondie	1970s	Pop-Rock	Mar 9, 2010	No	No
"Car Windows"	The Main Drag	2000s	Indie Rock	Mar 9, 2010	Jun 2, 2011	No
"Descend Into the Eternal Pits of Possession"	The Project Hate MCMXCIX	2000s	Metal	Mar 9, 2010	Aug 10, 2010	No
"Life Unworthy of Life"	Warpath	2000s	Metal	Mar 9, 2010	Oct 26, 2010	Dec 21, 2010
"Love and the Triumph Of"	Broadcast	2000s	Alternative	Mar 9, 2010	Mar 15, 2011	No
"Second Best Friend"	The Nebraska Sailing Authority	2000s	Rock	Mar 9, 2010	No	No
"The Most Beautiful Girl (In the Room)"	Flight of the Conchords	2000s	Novelty	Mar 9, 2010	Jun 1, 2010	Oct 19, 2010
"Whatever Happened to You"	Cate Sparks	2000s	Pop-Rock	Mar 9, 2010	Aug 24, 2010	Sep 7, 2010
"Bohemian Like You"	The Dandy Warhols	2000s	Alternative	Mar 10, 2010	No	No
"Day to Day"	Eulogies	2000s	Indie Rock	Mar 10, 2010	No	No
"Destructive Device"	Mindflow	2000s	Prog	Mar 10, 2010	Jun 2, 2011	No
"Moonshine Hollar"	Zack Wilson	2010s	Rock	Mar 11, 2010	No	No
"Still Alive"	World Minus One	2000s	Rock	Mar 11, 2010	No	No
"What a Trip"	Analogue Revolution feat. First Be	2000s	Urban	Mar 11, 2010	No	No
"Dirty South Rock"	Hyro da Hero	2000s	Urban	Mar 12, 2010	No	No
"One Bad Man"	Midnight Riders	2000s	Southern Rock	Mar 13, 2010	Jun 7, 2011	No
"Battle Royale"	The Word Alive	2000s	Metal	Mar 14, 2010	Jun 29, 2010	Oct 19, 2010
"Elements"	Texas in July	2000s	Metal	Mar 14, 2010	Aug 3, 2010	Oct 5, 2010
"My New Favorite Disaster"	Megaphone	2000s	Rock	Mar 14, 2010	No	No
"Nothing There"	Oliver Pride	2000s	Rock	Mar 14, 2010	No	No
"Rise"	Solarcade	2000s	Pop-Rock	Mar 14, 2010	No	No
"The Mob Goes Wild"	Clutch	2000s	Rock	Mar 14, 2010	Jun 8, 2010	Oct 26, 2010
"You're A Wolf"	Sea Wolf	2000s	Indie Rock	Mar 14, 2010	Apr 19, 2011	No
"50,000 Unstoppable Watts"	Clutch	2000s	Rock	Mar 15, 2010	Jul 20, 2010	Nov 2, 2010
"Dragonfly" (Symbion Project Remix)	Universal Hall Pass	2000s	Alternative	Mar 15, 2010	Jun 7, 2011	No
"We Are Not Anonymous"	Unearth	2000s	Metal	Mar 15, 2010	May 25, 2010	Oct 19, 2010
"Business Time"	Flight of the Conchords	2000s	Novelty	Mar 16, 2010	Apr 29, 2010	Sep 21, 2010
"Dirty King"	The Cliks	2000s	Rock	Mar 16, 2010	No	No
"I'm Made of Wax, Larry, What Are You Made Of?"	A Day to Remember	2000s	Punk	Mar 16, 2010	May 12, 2010	Sep 14, 2010
"Midnight Ride"	Midnight Riders	2000s	Southern Rock	Mar 16, 2010	Jun 7, 2011	No
"Semi-Charmed Life '09"	Third Eye Blind	2000s	Rock	Mar 16, 2010	May 4, 2010	Sep 7, 2010
"Bodies"	Drowning Pool	2000s	Nu-Metal	Mar 17, 2010	May 4, 2010	Sep 7, 2010
"'Collapsing"	Demon Hunter	2010s	Metal	Mar 17, 2010	Jun 8, 2010	Oct 26, 2010
"Days Without"	All That Remains	2000s	Metal	Mar 17, 2010	May 18, 2010	Sep 21, 2010
"One Step Further"	MxPx	2000s	Punk	Mar 17, 2010	No	No
"Being Here"	The Stills	2000s	Indie Rock	Mar 18, 2010	May 25, 2010	No
"Dance With Me"	Stewart	2000s	Punk	Mar 18, 2010	Jun 2, 2011	No
"Remedy"	Seether	2000s	Metal	Mar 18, 2010	May 12, 2010	Sep 14, 2010
"Energy"	The Apples in Stereo	2000s	Pop-Rock	Mar 19, 2010	May 18, 2010	Sep 21, 2010
"First We Feast, Then We Felony"	Circus Circus	2000s	Metal	Mar 19, 2010	Sep 28, 2010	Nov 16, 2010
"Hot Sexy Girls"	Joe Sibol	2000s	Pop-Rock	Mar 19, 2010	No	No
"I Know What I Am"	Band of Skulls	2000s	Indie Rock	Mar 19, 2010	May 4, 2010	Sep 7, 2010
"I'm Alive"	Kid Beyond	2010s	Rock	Mar 19, 2010	No	No
"Past Lives"	The Bronx	2000s	Punk	Mar 19, 2010	No	No
"Taking Apart a Gigantic Machine"	The Main Drag	2000s	Indie Rock	Mar 19, 2010	Jun 2, 2011	No
"Too Hot to Handle"	Carl Douglas	2000s	Rock	Mar 19, 2010	No	No
"Under Water I Drown"	Edge	2000s	Alternative	Mar 19, 2010	Jun 3, 2011	No
"Anything"	Kristin Dare	2000s	Rock	Mar 20, 2010	No	No
"Do Not Disturb (Tell Me How Bad)"	Let's Get It	2000s	Pop-Rock	Mar 20, 2010	Aug 31, 2010	Sep 14, 2010
"Gravitate"	Megaphone	2000s	Rock	Mar 20, 2010	No	No
"Roll the Dice"	Damone	2000s	Rock	Mar 20, 2010	Feb 1, 2011	No
"Scavengers of the Damned"	Aiden	2000s	Punk	Mar 20, 2010	Nov 9, 2010	No
"Upstream"	Cory Wong	2000s	Blues	Mar 20, 2010	No	No
"Hook, Line, and Sinner"	Texas in July	2000s	Metal	Mar 21, 2010	Aug 17, 2010	Nov 9, 2010
"I Don't Think That's OK"	Josh Freese	2000s	Rock	Mar 21, 2010	No	No
"A Thousand Nights"	Mile Marker Zero	2000s	Prog	Mar 22, 2010	No	No
"Not Your Enemy"	Megaphone	2000s	Rock	Mar 22, 2010	No	No
"A Little Faster"	There for Tomorrow	2000s	Alternative	Mar 23, 2010	May 25, 2010	Oct 19, 2010
"Gasoline"	The Bouncing Souls	2010s	Punk	Mar 23, 2010	Jan 11, 2011	No
"Synthesized"	Symbion Project	2000s	Other	Mar 23, 2010	Jun 7, 2011	No
"Trash Candy"	Tijuana Sweetheart	2000s	Punk	Mar 23, 2010	No	No
"Burn"	Big Square	2000s	Rock	Mar 25, 2010	No	No
"When I Get Home, You're So Dead"	Mayday Parade	2000s	Rock	Mar 25, 2010	May 12, 2010	Sep 14, 2010
"Never Let You Go '09"	Third Eye Blind	2000s	Rock	Mar 29, 2010	Jun 15, 2010	Oct 12, 2010
"Perfect World"	Moving Picture Show	2000s	Rock	Mar 29, 2010	No	No
"Step Up (I'm on It)"	Maylene and the Sons of Disaster	2000s	Rock	Mar 29, 2010	Sep 21, 2010	Nov 2, 2010
"Eveready"	Modern Skirts	2000s	Indie Rock	Mar 30, 2010	No	No
"Scream Ceremony"	Order of the Crimson Wizard	2000s	Rock	Mar 30, 2010	No	No
"Unstoppable"	White Line Allstars	2000s	Rock	Mar 30, 2010	No	No
"Burning Rome"	Minnesota Sex Junkies	2000s	Indie Rock	Apr 1, 2010	No	No
"Love Is the Only Thing"	Andy Kirk	2010s	Pop-Rock	Apr 1, 2010	No	No
"Sound of the Redeemed"	Jonathan Lee	2000s	Pop-Rock	Apr 1, 2010	No	No
"Young Bloods"	The Bronx	2000s	Punk	Apr 1, 2010	No	No
"Home"	Fear Without Reason	2010s	Rock	Apr 5, 2010	No	No
"Rearview Mirror"	Zack Wilson	2010s	Alternative	Apr 5, 2010	No	No
"Sending Signals"	Evergreen Terrace	2000s	Metal	Apr 5, 2010	Oct 19, 2010	Dec 21, 2010
"Where the Light Was Born (Thule Ultima a Sole Nomen Habens)"	Bornholm	2000s	Metal	Apr 5, 2010	No	No
"Where We're Goin"	The Japanese Frog	2000s	Other	Apr 5, 2010	No	No
"1348"	Umphrey's McGee	2000s	Rock	Apr 7, 2010	Jul 6, 2010	No
"All Eyes on Me"	The Carsitters	2000s	Rock	Apr 7, 2010	No	No
"All My Friends Are Crazy"	500 Miles to Memphis	2000s	Country	Apr 7, 2010	No	No
"Doomsday Party"	Sybreed	2000s	Metal	Apr 7, 2010	No	No
"Midnight Daydreams"	No Crossing	2000s	New Wave	Apr 7, 2010	No	No
"Forever in Your Hands"	All That Remains	2000s	Metal	Apr 8, 2010	Jun 1, 2010	Oct 19, 2010
"Gravity (Don't Let Me Go)"	Jon Black & the Winter Hearts	2010s	Rock	Apr 9, 2010	No	No
"Wings of Infinity"	C&O	2000s	Rock	Apr 9, 2010	No	No
"Bow Down"	Chrome Coma	2010s	Rock	Apr 12, 2010	No	No
"Chalk Lines"	Division Day	2000s	Indie Rock	Apr 12, 2010	No	No
"Drag Me Away"	Aminal	2000s	Indie Rock	Apr 12, 2010	No	No
"Eden was a Garden"	Roman Candle	2000s	Southern Rock	Apr 12, 2010	No	No
"Let the Games Begin"	Anarbor	2010s	Alternative	Apr 12, 2010	Aug 17, 2010	Nov 9, 2010
"Motorcide"	Man Parts	2010s	Novelty	Apr 12, 2010	No	No
"Rude Awakening"	Squeezebox	2000s	Rock	Apr 12, 2010	No	No
"The Price"	Dappled Cities	2000s	Indie Rock	Apr 12, 2010	Aug 24, 2010	Sep 7, 2010
"Tunnels Of Vision"	Sear Bliss	1990s	Metal	Apr 12, 2010	No	No
"I Am Legion"	Bibleblack	2000s	Metal	Apr 13, 2010	No	No
"Last Mistake"	RED9	2000s	Rock	Apr 13, 2010	No	No
"The Girl at the Video Game Store"	Parry Gripp	2000s	Novelty	Apr 13, 2010	Jul 13, 2010	Nov 16, 2010
"Numb"	Aittala	2000s	Metal	Apr 15, 2010	No	No
"One Step Behind"	A Hero Next Door	2000s	Punk	Apr 15, 2010	No	No
"You Stay. I Go. No Following."	Look Mexico	2010s	Indie Rock	Apr 15, 2010	No	No
"Close Your Eyes"	Jonathan Lee	2000s	Pop-Rock	Apr 16, 2010	No	No
"Elisheva, I Love You"	Junius	2000s	Indie Rock	Apr 16, 2010	No	No
"Blink"	Father Octopus	2010s	Rock	Apr 20, 2010	No	No
"Bringing Love to the Party"	Steele & Britton feat. Taryn Murphy	2000s	Other	Apr 20, 2010	No	No
"Caught"	Steele & Holden feat. Darren Holden	2000s	Pop-Rock	Apr 20, 2010	No	No
"Death Comes (The Wedding Night)"	Inkubus Sukkubus	2000s	Glam	Apr 20, 2010	No	No
"Frontier Factory"	Freen in Green	2000s	Prog	Apr 20, 2010	No	No
"Goodnight Technologist"	The Main Drag	2000s	Indie Rock	Apr 20, 2010	Jun 2, 2011	No
"Henchmen Ride"	Testament	2000s	Metal	Apr 20, 2010	Jul 6, 2010	Oct 26, 2010
"Indigo Friends"	Reverend Horton Heat	2000s	Alternative	Apr 20, 2010	Jul 20, 2010	Nov 2, 2010
"Jumper '09"	Third Eye Blind	2000s	Alternative	Apr 20, 2010	Jun 22, 2010	Sep 28, 2010
"Take Control"	The New Regime	2000s	Rock	Apr 20, 2010	No	No
"We Are the Nightmare"	Arsis	2000s	Metal	Apr 20, 2010	Aug 10, 2010	Nov 9, 2010
"HTML Rulez D00d"	The Devil Wears Prada	2000s	Metal	Apr 22, 2010	Jun 22, 2010	Sep 28, 2010
"In Memory"	Excruciating Thoughts	2000s	Metal	Apr 22, 2010	Oct 19, 2010	Nov 23, 2010
"NDE"	Blow Up Hollywood	2000s	Indie Rock	Apr 22, 2010	No	No
"American Dream"	Silverstein	2000s	Rock	Apr 27, 2010	Jun 29, 2010	No
"Beautiful"	Andy Kirk	2010s	Pop-Rock	Apr 27, 2010	No	No
"Dead to the World"	The Fire Violets	2010s	Alternative	Apr 27, 2010	No	No
"Delaware Are You? I Don't Know Alaska."	Safari So Good	2010s	Punk	Apr 27, 2010	No	No
"Dogs Can Grow Beards All Over"	The Devil Wears Prada	2000s	Metal	Apr 27, 2010	Jul 13, 2010	Nov 16, 2010
"Exploited & Exposed"	Symbion Project	2000s	Other	Apr 27, 2010	Jun 7, 2011	No
"Homeward Bound"	Tumbledown	2000s	Country	Apr 27, 2010	No	No
"Plans & Reveries"	Black Gold	2000s	Pop-Rock	Apr 27, 2010	No	No
"Undone"	All That Remains	2000s	Metal	Apr 27, 2010	Jun 29, 2010	Oct 19, 2010
"Dethroned"	Death Angel	2000s	Metal	May 5, 2010	Nov 9, 2010	Dec 21, 2010
"End of This"	Scratching the Itch	2010s	New Wave	May 5, 2010	No	No
"Even Seconds"	The Main Drag	2000s	Indie Rock	May 5, 2010	Jun 2, 2011	No
"Heads or Tails? Real or Not"	Emarosa	2000s	Alternative	May 5, 2010	Aug 3, 2010	Oct 5, 2010
"Montana"	The Main Drag	2000s	Indie Rock	May 5, 2010	Jun 2, 2011	No
"Paralyzer"	Finger Eleven	2000s	Pop-Rock	May 5, 2010	Jun 22, 2010	Sep 28, 2010
"People Like You"	Forever from Now	2000s	Alternative	May 5, 2010	No	No
"Shot at the Title"	Your Horrible Smile	2000s	Rock	May 5, 2010	No	No
"Swine Houses"	The Main Drag	2000s	Indie Rock	May 5, 2010	Jun 2, 2011	No
"The Funeral"	Band of Horses	2000s	Indie Rock	May 5, 2010	Jul 6, 2010	Oct 26, 2010
"Chelsea"	The Summer Set	2000s	Pop-Rock	May 6, 2010	Sep 21, 2010	Nov 2, 2010
"Death Quota for Purification"	The Myriad Burial	2000s	Metal	May 6, 2010	Oct 5, 2010	Nov 23, 2010
"Doomed"	8 Inch Betsy	2000s	Punk	May 6, 2010	No	No
"Radiator"	Family Force 5	2000s	Rock	May 6, 2010	Nov 16, 2010	Dec 21, 2010
"The Crying Machine (Live)"	Steve Vai	2000s	Rock	May 6, 2010	Aug 10, 2010	Nov 9, 2010
"Unfurling a Darkened Gospel"	Job for a Cowboy	2000s	Metal	May 6, 2010	Aug 17, 2010	Nov 9, 2010
"Where Were You?"	Every Avenue	2000s	Alternative	May 6, 2010	Aug 31, 2010	Sep 14, 2010
"You've Got Someone"	Blue News	2010s	Alternative	May 6, 2010	No	No
"Beauty Queen"	The Fury	2000s	Rock	May 10, 2010	No	No
"Dr. Doom"	The Acacia Strain	2000s	Metal	May 10, 2010	Sep 7, 2010	Nov 16, 2010
"Inheritance"	Single White Infidel	2010s	Punk	May 10, 2010	No	No
"Last Train to Awesometown"	Parry Gripp	2000s	Novelty	May 10, 2010	Oct 19, 2010	Jan 11, 2011
"Redemption"	Andy Timmons	2000s	Rock	May 10, 2010	Dec 7, 2010	Jan 11, 2011
"You Take It All"	A t o m	2010s	New Wave	May 10, 2010	No	No
"Automatic Doors"	A'tris	2000s	Indie Rock	May 13, 2010	No	No
"Chemical Infatuation"	Like A Storm	2000s	Rock	May 13, 2010	No	No
"Don't Feel Like That Anymore" (Note: Available as Rock Band 3 DLC through codes found on packages of Schick razors.)	Johnny Cooper	2000s	Rock	May 13, 2010	Dec 21, 2010	No
"Hungarian Dance No. 5 (Brahms)"	Paul Henry Smith & the Fauxharmonic Orchestra	2010s	Other	May 13, 2010	No	No
"Light of Day"	A t o m	2010s	New Wave	May 13, 2010	No	No
"Night on Bald Mountain (Mussorgsky)"	Paul Henry Smith & the Fauxharmonic Orchestra	2010s	Other	May 13, 2010	No	No
"Rock Your Socks Off"	Midnight Ocelot	2010s	Metal	May 13, 2010	No	No
"Swallow the Razor"	Bang Camaro	2000s	Rock	May 13, 2010	Sep 14, 2010	Oct 12, 2010
"Wrong Side of the Sky"	Rose of Jericho	2000s	Pop-Rock	May 13, 2010	No	No
"Everyone I Know is an Alcoholic"	Robby Suavé	2000s	Other	May 14, 2010	No	No
"Flight of the Bumblebee (Rimsky-Korsakov)"	Paul Henry Smith & the Fauxharmonic Orchestra	2000s	Other	May 14, 2010	No	No
"Knifeman"	The Bronx	2000s	Punk	May 14, 2010	No	No
"You're Not Alone - Rock Mix"	A t o m	2010s	New Wave	May 14, 2010	No	No
"India"	Circus Circus	2000s	Punk	May 17, 2010	No	No
"The Great Plains"	Scale the Summit	2000s	Prog	May 17, 2010	Aug 24, 2010	Sep 7, 2010
"Til I'm Gone"	Kristin Dare	2000s	Rock	May 17, 2010	No	No
"Walls"	All Time Low	2000s	Alternative	May 17, 2010	Jul 27, 2010	Sep 28, 2010
"We're Not Getting Any Younger"	Color Theory	2000s	Other	May 17, 2010	No	No
"Bra Off Party On"	Thunderdikk	2000s	Rock	May 18, 2010	No	No
"Death Metal Guys"	Reverend Horton Heat	2000s	Alternative	May 18, 2010	Oct 12, 2010	No
"It's Not Paranoia If They're Shooting Live Bullets"	Sadaharu	2000s	Punk	May 18, 2010	No	No
"Now Demolition"	Evile	2000s	Metal	May 18, 2010	Sep 28, 2010	Nov 23, 2010
"Paper Dolls"	Ballyhoo!	2000s	Rock	May 18, 2010	Apr 19, 2011	No
"Tastes Like Kevin Bacon"	iwrestledabearonce	2000s	Metal	May 18, 2010	Jul 27, 2010	Sep 28, 2010
"Valkyries"	Amberian Dawn	2000s	Metal	May 18, 2010	Sep 7, 2010	Nov 16, 2010
"Eency Weency Spider"	CJ	2000s	Pop-Rock	May 19, 2010	No	No
"Santa Fe"	Blackberry River Band	2000s	Country	May 19, 2010	No	No
"Shape 3"	Farther Snake	2000s	Metal	May 19, 2010	No	No
"Sunday Suit"	Connor Christian and Southern Gothic	2000s	Country	May 19, 2010	No	No
"By Yourself"	The Knew	2000s	Rock	May 20, 2010	No	No
"Five More Minutes"	Counterfeit Pennies	2010s	Punk	May 20, 2010	No	No
"Is There a Ghost"	Band of Horses	2000s	Indie Rock	May 20, 2010	Aug 3, 2010	Oct 5, 2010
"You're an Egg! (Evolution)"	Windtunnel Syndrome	2010s	Prog	May 20, 2010	No	No
"Fat Kid"	Nothing More	2000s	Rock	May 21, 2010	No	No
"Satellite (Live)"	A t o m	2010s	New Wave	May 21, 2010	No	No
"Dance Floor"	The Apples in Stereo	2010s	Pop-Rock	May 24, 2010	No	No
"Fight to Kill"	Holy Grail	2000s	Metal	May 24, 2010	Nov 16, 2010	No
"Footprints"	John Garrison	2000s	Alternative	May 24, 2010	No	No
"Mr. Sun"	CJ	2000s	Pop-Rock	May 24, 2010	No	No
"Oye Vaya"	Earl Greyhound	2010s	Rock	May 24, 2010	Jun 2, 2011	No
"Stay Up With Me"	After the Fall	2010s	Rock	May 24, 2010	No	No
"You All Everybody"	Drive Shaft	2000s	Rock	May 24, 2010	Jul 13, 2010	Jan 4, 2011
"Dharma Lady"	Geronimo Jackson	2010s	Classic Rock	May 25, 2010	No	No
"How We Roll"	Plushgun	2000s	New Wave	May 27, 2010	Jul 20, 2010	No
"The Way You Move"	The Audition	2000s	Alternative	May 27, 2010	Jun 2, 2011	No
"We Are the One"	Anti-Flag	2000s	Punk	May 27, 2010	Sep 7, 2010	Nov 16, 2010
"American Hero"	Ron Wasserman	2010s	Rock	Jun 1, 2010	No	No
"Disappear in You"	Clandestine	2000s	Metal	Jun 1, 2010	No	No
"Freakshow"	HourCast	2010s	Rock	Jun 1, 2010	Dec 21, 2010	No
"Hail Destroyer"	Cancer Bats	2000s	Metal	Jun 1, 2010	Sep 28, 2010	No
"Live For Today"	Sullivan DeMott	2000s	Rock	Jun 1, 2010	No	No
"Shake"	A t o m	2010s	New Wave	Jun 1, 2010	No	No
"Sorceress"	Cancer Bats	2000s	Metal	Jun 1, 2010	No	No
"This F***ing Job"	Drive-By Truckers	2010s	Rock	Jun 1, 2010	No	No
"When We Fall"	Gentlemen At Arms	2000s	Alternative	Jun 1, 2010	No	No
"Blow at High Dough"	The Tragically Hip	1980s	Rock	Jun 7, 2010	Aug 17, 2010	Nov 9, 2010
"Dead Wrong"	Cancer Bats	2010s	Metal	Jun 7, 2010	No	No
"Haunt My Mind"	The New Regime	2000s	Rock	Jun 7, 2010	No	No
"Higher"	Creed	1990s	Rock	Jun 7, 2010	Jul 27, 2010	Sep 28, 2010
"Riot Act"	Exodus	2000s	Metal	Jun 7, 2010	Sep 21, 2010	Nov 2, 2010
"Smile (Live)"	The Gufs	2000s	Rock	Jun 7, 2010	No	No
"Surprise"	Verse Versus Chorus	2000s	Indie Rock	Jun 7, 2010	No	No
"Walking Away"	Made Avail	2010s	Alternative	Jun 7, 2010	No	No
"Fake It"	Seether	2000s	Metal	Jun 8, 2010	Aug 3, 2010	Oct 5, 2010
"Soldier from the Surface"	Windtunnel Syndrome	2010s	Prog	Jun 8, 2010	No	No
"Tap Dancing In A Minefield"	The New Regime	2000s	Rock	Jun 8, 2010	No	No
"Daughter"	The Reverend H Chronicles	2000s	Metal	Jun 9, 2010	No	No
"I Wanna Be An Alien's Pet"	Alien Downlink	2000s	Punk	Jun 9, 2010	No	No
"Friday the 13th"	The Riptides	2010s	Punk	Jun 11, 2010	No	No
"Molten Death"	Man Parts	2010s	Novelty	Jun 11, 2010	No	No
"Tree Village"	Dance Gavin Dance	2000s	Metal	Jun 11, 2010	Aug 10, 2010	Nov 9, 2010
"Young"	Twintapes	2000s	Indie Rock	Jun 11, 2010	No	No
"America Underwater"	LoveHateHero	2000s	Emo	Jun 14, 2010	Oct 12, 2010	Nov 23, 2010
"Anybody Else"	Audible Mainframe	2000s	Urban	Jun 14, 2010	Jun 2, 2011	No
"Bang Camaro"	Bang Camaro	2000s	Rock	Jun 14, 2010	Aug 31, 2010	Sep 14, 2010
"Cheating, Lying, Stealing"	Bang on a Can All-Stars / David Lang	2000s	Other	Jun 14, 2010	No	No
"Circles"	Something Opus	2000s	Indie Rock	Jun 14, 2010	No	No
"Detroit City"	Drivin' N' Cryin'	2000s	Rock	Jun 14, 2010	No	No
"Fire Away"	Kill the Alarm	2000s	Alternative	Jun 14, 2010	Jun 3, 2011	No
"I See Georgia"	Drivin' N' Cryin'	2000s	Rock	Jun 14, 2010	No	No
"I'm Coming Home"	A t o m	2010s	New Wave	Jun 14, 2010	No	No
"Ice Cold"	Audible Mainframe	2000s	Urban	Jun 14, 2010	Jun 2, 2011	No
"Let Me Down"	Drivin' N' Cryin'	2000s	Rock	Jun 14, 2010	No	No
"Nightlife Commando"	Bang Camaro	2000s	Rock	Jun 14, 2010	Sep 14, 2010	Oct 12, 2010
"ShadowBang (Head)"	Bang on a Can All-Stars / Evan Ziporyn	2000s	Other	Jun 14, 2010	No	No
"Shop Vac"	Jonathan Coulton	2000s	Rock	Jun 14, 2010	Sep 14, 2010	Oct 12, 2010
"Yo Shakespeare"	Bang on a Can All-Stars / Michael Gordon	1990s	Other	Jun 14, 2010	No	No
"An Exercise in Futility"	Single White Infidel	2010s	Punk	Jun 15, 2010	No	No
"Beethoven - Symphony No. 9 - Scherzo"	Paul Henry Smith & the Fauxharmonic Orchestra	2010s	Other	Jun 15, 2010	No	No
"Infected Nation"	Evile	2000s	Metal	Jun 15, 2010	Oct 5, 2010	Nov 23, 2010
"Rise Above This"	Seether	2000s	Alternative	Jun 15, 2010	Jan 4, 2011	No
"Scared to Death"	Cancer Bats	2010s	Metal	Jun 15, 2010	No	No
"Serial Killer"	Damone	2000s	Rock	Jun 16, 2010	Feb 22, 2011	No
"Travelin' Freak Show"	Joe Bouchard	2000s	Classic Rock	Jun 16, 2010	No	No
"Wake Up"	Me Talk Pretty	2010s	Rock	Jun 16, 2010	Sep 7, 2010	Jan 4, 2011
"Dream About the Future"	The Apples in Stereo	2010s	Pop-Rock	Jun 18, 2010	No	No
"Hitch Up (I'm So Stupid)"	Jesus Candy	2010s	Rock	Jun 18, 2010	No	No
"Hot Stuff"	Scott Attrill	2000s	Other	Jun 18, 2010	No	No
"Painted"	Zoo Seven	2010s	Rock	Jun 18, 2010	No	No
"Bled To Be Free (The Operation)"	Rx Bandits	2000s	Alternative	Jun 21, 2010	Nov 30, 2010	No
"Bleed"	Meshuggah	2000s	Metal	Jun 21, 2010	Sep 7, 2010	Nov 16, 2010
"Bright Side of Life"	Rebelution	2000s	Rock	Jun 21, 2010	No	No
"Bury You Slowly"	Made Avail	2010s	Alternative	Jun 21, 2010	No	No
"Cookie Monster"	XTT	2010s	Novelty	Jun 21, 2010	No	No
"Crash Years"	The New Pornographers	2010s	Indie Rock	Jun 21, 2010	Sep 21, 2010	Nov 2, 2010
"Crooked Strings"	Kiev	2000s	Alternative	Jun 21, 2010	Mar 8, 2011	No
"Janie"	The Raspberry Ants	2010s	Indie Rock	Jun 21, 2010	No	No
"Mandelbrot Set"	Jonathan Coulton	2000s	Rock	Jun 21, 2010	Aug 17, 2010	No
"Six Is One"	Free Electric State	2010s	Indie Rock	Jun 21, 2010	No	No
"The World Is a Thorn"	Demon Hunter	2010s	Metal	Jun 21, 2010	Nov 23, 2010	Jan 4, 2011
"Three Words"	Todd Thibaud	2000s	Country	Jun 21, 2010	No	No
"Turnpike Ghost"	Steel Train	2010s	Alternative	Jun 21, 2010	No	No
"A Better Forever"	SexTon	2010s	Alternative	Jun 23, 2010	No	No
"Engine"	Wargasm	1990s	Metal	Jun 23, 2010	Dec 7, 2010	No
"The Lesser Man"	SOiL	2000s	Rock	Jun 23, 2010	Jun 3, 2011	No
"Ramp Truck"	Freen in Green	2010s	Prog	Jun 25, 2010	No	No
"Run"	Charmaine	2010s	Other	Jun 25, 2010	No	No
"The Me You See"	Spiral Trance	2000s	Metal	Jun 25, 2010	No	No
"Believing"	Bang on a Can All-Stars / Julia Wolfe	2000s	Other	Jun 28, 2010	No	No
"Deliver Us"	Andy Timmons	2000s	Rock	Jun 28, 2010	Jan 4, 2011	Jan 11, 2011
"Nosophoros"	Evile	2000s	Metal	Jun 28, 2010	Jan 18, 2011	No
"Touche, Miss Indenial"	Jamestown Story	2000s	Pop-Rock	Jun 28, 2010	No	No
"Buster Voodoo"	Rodrigo y Gabriela	2000s	Rock	Jun 29, 2010	Aug 24, 2010	Sep 7, 2010
"Divine"	XTT	2010s	Rock	Jun 29, 2010	No	No
"Outta the Band"	My First Earthquake	2000s	Indie Rock	Jun 30, 2010	No	No
"Beautiful Machine"	Rose of Jericho	2010s	Pop-Rock	Jul 1, 2010	No	No
"Real Love"	RED9	2000s	Rock	Jul 1, 2010	No	No
"Throughout"	Done Lying Down	1990s	Punk	Jul 1, 2010	No	No
"Tomorrow She's Mine"	Rod Kim	2010s	Pop-Rock	Jul 1, 2010	No	No
"Why Bother?"	Scratching the Itch	2000s	Alternative	Jul 1, 2010	No	No
"Big Deal"	HourCast	2010s	Rock	Jul 2, 2010	No	No
"Black Cloud"	Scott Gehrett	2010s	Metal	Jul 2, 2010	No	No
"Burst Into Fears"	SexTon	2010s	Alternative	Jul 2, 2010	No	No
"Hard to See"	Five Finger Death Punch	2000s	Rock	Jul 2, 2010	Aug 31, 2010	Sep 14, 2010
"Told You Once"	The Apples in Stereo	2010s	Pop-Rock	Jul 2, 2010	No	No
"Death By Cancer"	Seppuku With a Straw	2010s	Other	Jul 6, 2010	No	No
"Flicker"	Widespread Panic	2000s	Rock	Jul 6, 2010	No	No
"In My Head, Out My Head"	Primary	2010s	Alternative	Jul 6, 2010	No	No
"Liberated by Blasphemy"	Adam Evil	2000s	Metal	Jul 6, 2010	No	No
"Nom Nom Nom Nom Nom Nom Nom"	Parry Gripp	2000s	Novelty	Jul 6, 2010	Oct 19, 2010	Jan 4, 2011
"Seven"	Sunny Day Real Estate	1990s	Emo	Jul 6, 2010	Aug 31, 2010	Sep 14, 2010
"Simple Man"	Highlord	2000s	Metal	Jul 6, 2010	No	No
"So Easy"	Blue News	2010s	Alternative	Jul 6, 2010	No	No
"The Ultimate Showdown (RBN Mix)"	Lemon Demon	2010s	Pop-Rock	Jul 6, 2010	Aug 24, 2010	Sep 7, 2010
"Tora Tora Tora"	Pretty & Nice	2000s	Pop-Rock	Jul 6, 2010	Jun 2, 2011	No
"War Against the Radio"	Audio Ammunition	2000s	Rock	Jul 6, 2010	No	No
"Wytches 2010"	Inkubus Sukkubus	2010s	Glam	Jul 6, 2010	No	No
"Piranha"	Pretty & Nice	2000s	Pop-Rock	Jul 7, 2010	Jun 2, 2011	No
"So Awesome"	The Shazam	2000s	Rock	Jul 7, 2010	No	No
"Why"	C. J. Ramone	2000s	Punk	Jul 7, 2010	No	No
"Lights Out"	Hyro da Hero	2010s	Urban	Jul 9, 2010	No	No
"The Anthem of the Angry Brides"	Norma Jean	2010s	Metal	Jul 9, 2010	Jan 4, 2011	No
"Ain't Life Grand (Live)"	Widespread Panic	2000s	Rock	Jul 12, 2010	No	No
"Attraction"	HourCast	2010s	Rock	Jul 12, 2010	No	No
"Filthy Dog"	Aittala	2000s	Metal	Jul 12, 2010	No	No
"Happy Little Tune"	DeBaser	2000s	New Wave	Jul 12, 2010	No	No
"Leaderless and Self Enlisted"	Norma Jean	2010s	Metal	Jul 12, 2010	Sep 28, 2010	Nov 16, 2010
"Pedal Down"	Assembly of Dust	2000s	Rock	Jul 12, 2010	No	No
"Right Now Romeo"	Mason Douglas feat. Blue Morning	2000s	Country	Jul 12, 2010	No	No
"Deathbed Atheist"	Norma Jean	2010s	Metal	Jul 13, 2010	No	No
"Do It to Me"	C. J. Ramone	2000s	Punk	Jul 13, 2010	No	No
"Love Song"	No Justice	2010s	Country	Jul 13, 2010	No	No
"Take Me Away"	Rose of Jericho	2000s	Pop-Rock	Jul 13, 2010	No	No
"The Final Episode (Let's Change the Channel)"	Asking Alexandria	2000s	Metal	Jul 13, 2010	Sep 14, 2010	Oct 12, 2010
"Until the Night"	Free Spirit	2000s	Rock	Jul 13, 2010	No	No
"Embrace Your Rage"	Kramus	2000s	Rock	Jul 14, 2010	No	No
"Jigsaw Man"	Wargasm	1990s	Metal	Jul 14, 2010	No	No
"Come Along"	XTT	2010s	Alternative	Jul 16, 2010	No	No
"Here and Gone"	Sullivan DeMott	2000s	Southern Rock	Jul 16, 2010	No	No
"Hey Elevator"	The Apples in Stereo	2010s	Pop-Rock	Jul 16, 2010	No	No
"Beautiful Collapse (Stalker)"	Brett Merrill & Brendan Carell	2010s	New Wave	Jul 19, 2010	No	No
"Blinded"	Down Factor	2000s	Metal	Jul 19, 2010	No	No
"Charmed"	OWL	2000s	Rock	Jul 19, 2010	No	No
"Curse You All Men! (Live)"	Emperor	2000s	Metal	Jul 19, 2010	Nov 16, 2010	Dec 21, 2010
"Desperate Days"	Jenium	2000s	Indie Rock	Jul 19, 2010	No	No
"Doublecrossed"	Valient Thorr	2010s	Rock	Jul 19, 2010	No	No
"Hell or Hollywood"	HourCast	2010s	Rock	Jul 19, 2010	No	No
"Inno a Satana (Live)"	Emperor	2000s	Metal	Jul 19, 2010	Dec 7, 2010	No
"No Mercy"	Tijuana Sweetheart	2000s	Punk	Jul 19, 2010	No	No
"No One's Gonna Love You"	Band of Horses	2000s	Indie Rock	Jul 19, 2010	Oct 12, 2010	Nov 23, 2010
"Rollercoaster"	Sleater-Kinney	2000s	Indie Rock	Jul 19, 2010	Nov 23, 2010	Dec 21, 2010
"Surf Spy"	The Everybody	2000s	Indie Rock	Jul 19, 2010	No	No
"To the Otherside"	A t o m	2000s	New Wave	Jul 19, 2010	No	No
"Blood Red Rock"	Bang Camaro	2000s	Rock	Jul 20, 2010	Nov 9, 2010	Dec 21, 2010
"Plague to End All Plagues"	Evile	2000s	Metal	Jul 20, 2010	Apr 19, 2011	No
"Electro-Heaven"	Robby Suavé	2000s	Metal	Jul 21, 2010	No	No
"Incubus"	Amberian Dawn	2000s	Metal	Jul 21, 2010	Oct 12, 2010	Nov 23, 2010
"No One In the World"	The Apples in Stereo	2010s	Pop-Rock	Jul 21, 2010	No	No
"Fighting Back the Bullies"	XTT	2010s	Metal	Jul 22, 2010	No	No
"Sabretooth"	Stars of Boulevard	2000s	Rock	Jul 22, 2010	No	No
"Every Day Is Sunday"	The Slackers	2000s	Rock	Jul 23, 2010	No	No
"Just Hang On"	2nd Thought	2000s	Rock	Jul 23, 2010	No	No
"Beautiful Disaster"	The Gufs	2000s	Alternative	Jul 26, 2010	No	No
"Chiron Beta Prime"	Jonathan Coulton	2000s	Rock	Jul 26, 2010	Oct 26, 2010	No
"Done"	The Giraffes	2000s	Rock	Jul 26, 2010	No	No
"Guitar Sound"	Ronald Jenkees	2000s	Other	Jul 26, 2010	Dec 7, 2010	No
"Guitars SUCK"	Bumblefoot	2000s	Metal	Jul 26, 2010	No	No
"Muéstrame un Poco"	Buffalo Mad	2010s	Rock	Jul 26, 2010	No	No
"Shallow Waters"	Amberian Dawn	2000s	Metal	Jul 26, 2010	Oct 5, 2010	Nov 23, 2010
"Strut"	The Elms	2000s	Rock	Jul 26, 2010	No	No
"Betty and Me"	Jonathan Coulton	2000s	Country	Jul 28, 2010	Oct 5, 2010	Nov 23, 2010
"Anna Maria (All We Need)"	We the Kings	2000s	Alternative	Jul 30, 2010	No	No
"Believe"	MJ Kroll	2000s	Pop-Rock	Jul 30, 2010	No	No
"Lately"	Day of Fire	2010s	Rock	Jul 30, 2010	No	No
"Rain Falls Down"	We the Kings	2000s	Alternative	Jul 30, 2010	No	No
"Spin"	We the Kings	2000s	Alternative	Jul 30, 2010	Nov 16, 2010	Dec 21, 2010
"What You Do to Me"	We the Kings	2000s	Alternative	Jul 30, 2010	No	No
"Wrong Side of the Tracks"	Hugh Cornwell	2000s	Rock	Jul 30, 2010	No	No
"Genocide"	Evile	2000s	Metal	Aug 3, 2010	Feb 22, 2011	No
"I Hope You're Happy"	Loren Dircks	2000s	Country	Aug 3, 2010	No	No
"Magician"	Lightwires	2000s	Indie Rock	Aug 3, 2010	No	No
"Summer Love"	We the Kings	2000s	Alternative	Aug 3, 2010	No	No
"Building a Robot"	Robotmakers	2010s	New Wave	Aug 4, 2010	No	No
"Entertain"	Sleater-Kinney	2000s	Indie Rock	Aug 4, 2010	Jun 2, 2011	No
"(Do You Wanna Date My) Avatar"	The Guild feat. Felicia Day	2000s	Other	Aug 6, 2010	Jan 4, 2011	Jan 4, 2011
"A Prophecy"	Asking Alexandria	2000s	Metal	Aug 6, 2010	Oct 19, 2010	Jan 4, 2011
"Crazy X"	Charlie Drown	2010s	Metal	Aug 6, 2010	No	No
"Hey There Mr. Brooks"	Asking Alexandria	2000s	Metal	Aug 6, 2010	Oct 5, 2010	Jan 4, 2011
"Satisfied"	Social Code	2010s	Rock	Aug 6, 2010	No	No
"The Great Salt Lake"	Band of Horses	2000s	Indie Rock	Aug 6, 2010	Nov 30, 2010	Jan 18, 2011
"Cheat on the Church"	Graveyard BBQ	2000s	Metal	Aug 9, 2010	Oct 26, 2010	Dec 21, 2010
"Hey Satomi (feat. Justine Skyers)"	The Bungles	2010s	Pop-Rock	Aug 9, 2010	No	No
"Jumpers"	Sleater-Kinney	2000s	Indie Rock	Aug 9, 2010	Feb 1, 2011	No
"Shoot the Zombies"	Songs To Wear Pants To	2000s	Novelty	Aug 9, 2010	No	No
"The Last Sound"	Grammatrain	2010s	Rock	Aug 9, 2010	No	No
"Heavy Plastic"	Alien Downlink	2000s	Novelty	Aug 12, 2010	No	No
"On the Airwaves"	The Shazam	2000s	Rock	Aug 12, 2010	No	No
"Rabbits"	Kingsize	2000s	Rock	Aug 12, 2010	No	No
"We Like the Moon"	Rathergood.com	2000s	Other	Aug 12, 2010	No	No
"Belladonna & Aconite 2010"	Inkubus Sukkubus	2010s	Glam	Aug 13, 2010	No	No
"In Circles"	Sunny Day Real Estate	1990s	Emo	Aug 13, 2010	Nov 16, 2010	Dec 21, 2010
"Broke Down on the Brazos"	Gov't Mule	2000s	Rock	Aug 16, 2010	Dec 14, 2010	No
"Echo (My Only Regret)"	SexTon	2010s	Alternative	Aug 16, 2010	No	No
"Forgotten Tragedy"	Cold Steel	2000s	Rock	Aug 16, 2010	No	No
"O Come, O Come Emmanuel"	Christmas at the Devil's House	2010s	Rock	Aug 16, 2010	No	No
"Swim"	Surfer Blood	2010s	Indie Rock	Aug 16, 2010	No	No
"The Pose"	Red Jacket Mine	2000s	Alternative	Aug 16, 2010	No	No
"(Random Song)"	Bluefusion	2010s	Other	Aug 18, 2010	No	No
"Floating Vibes"	Surfer Blood	2010s	Indie Rock	Aug 18, 2010	No	No
"Mr. Spock"	Nerf Herder	2000s	Punk	Aug 18, 2010	No	No
"The Ending Is Death"	Boney Mean	2010s	Metal	Aug 18, 2010	No	No
"Damn Good Man"	Moses Tucker	2000s	Blues	Aug 20, 2010	No	No
"Devoid of Thought"	Evile	2000s	Metal	Aug 20, 2010	Apr 12, 2011	No
"Fence Jumper"	The Fire Violets	2010s	Alternative	Aug 20, 2010	No	No
"Flesh Pull"	Mystic Syntax	2010s	Metal	Aug 20, 2010	No	No
"Hell's Sweet Hands"	Ashland Court	2000s	Rock	Aug 20, 2010	No	No
"Kokko - Eagle of Fire"	Amberian Dawn	2000s	Metal	Aug 20, 2010	Feb 8, 2011	No
"Song About an Angel"	Sunny Day Real Estate	1990s	Emo	Aug 20, 2010	Jan 18, 2011	No
"Uncivilized"	Texas in July	2010s	Metal	Aug 20, 2010	Nov 2, 2010	Dec 21, 2010
"You Ain't No Family"	iwrestledabearonce	2000s	Metal	Aug 20, 2010	Nov 9, 2010	Jan 4, 2011
"Your Petty Pretty Things"	The Get Up Kids	2010s	Rock	Aug 20, 2010	Jun 2, 2011	No
"Howling at Summer"	You Me and Iowa	2000s	Indie Rock	Aug 23, 2010	No	No
"I Cut Off My Arms"	J.A.C.K.	2000s	Rock	Aug 23, 2010	No	No
"I MAED A GAM3 W1TH Z0MB1ES 1N IT !!!1"	James Silva	2000s	Indie Rock	Aug 23, 2010	No	No
"Spring"	Your Heart	2010s	Pop-Rock	Aug 23, 2010	No	No
"XIV"	Chaotrope	2010s	Metal	Aug 23, 2010	No	No
"Honest Man"	The Gracious Few	2010s	Rock	Aug 26, 2010	No	No
"Living in a Whirlwind"	Warbringer	2000s	Metal	Aug 26, 2010	Nov 23, 2010	Dec 21, 2010
"Money Honey"	State of Shock	2000s	Pop-Rock	Aug 26, 2010	No	No
"Pawns"	Dead by Wednesday	2000s	Metal	Aug 26, 2010	No	No
"Time No More"	Evile	2000s	Metal	Aug 26, 2010	No	No
"Violent Center"	OWL	2000s	Rock	Aug 26, 2010	No	No
"Burn Her Out"	Shokkher	2010s	Metal	Aug 30, 2010	No	No
"Buy You a House"	Noah Engh The Kid Fantastic	2010s	Blues	Aug 30, 2010	No	No
"Cherry Red"	Sideburn	2000s	Rock	Aug 30, 2010	No	No
"Disco Rocket"	Scott Attrill	2010s	Other	Aug 30, 2010	No	No
"Lionheart"	Amberian Dawn	2000s	Metal	Aug 30, 2010	Nov 30, 2010	Jan 11, 2011
"Return to Blood Beach"	The Riptides	2000s	Rock	Aug 30, 2010	No	No
"Time-bomb"	Buttercup	1990s	Classic Rock	Aug 30, 2010	No	No
"Welcome to My World"	Nerf Herder	2000s	Punk	Aug 30, 2010	No	No
"White Table"	Delta Spirit	2010s	Rock	Aug 30, 2010	No	No
"Evil Inside Me"	Amberian Dawn	2000s	Metal	Aug 31, 2010	Apr 12, 2011	No
"Head Up High"	Firewind	2000s	Metal	Aug 31, 2010	Nov 30, 2010	Jan 18, 2011
"Pale Sister of Light"	Free Spirit	2000s	Rock	Aug 31, 2010	No	No
"Revolution"	Bang Camaro	2000s	Rock	Aug 31, 2010	Nov 2, 2010	Dec 21, 2010
"Determined (Vows of Vengeance)"	Kataklysm	2010s	Metal	Sep 3, 2010	Nov 2, 2010	No
"Girls Love Techno"	Scott Attrill	2010s	Other	Sep 3, 2010	No	No
"Beautiful Girl"	Sophie B. Hawkins	2000s	Pop-Rock	Sep 7, 2010	No	No
"Bridges and Overpasses"	Modern Skirts	2010s	Indie Rock	Sep 7, 2010	No	No
"Down Below"	Kramus	2010s	Rock	Sep 7, 2010	No	No
"Fool"	Brownies	2000s	Pop-Rock	Sep 7, 2010	No	No
"I've Got a Feeling"	Blackberry River Band	2000s	Rock	Sep 7, 2010	No	No
"iPhone"	Rhune Kincaid	2000s	Novelty	Sep 7, 2010	No	No
"Picture Perfect"	The Fury	2000s	Rock	Sep 7, 2010	No	No
"Ring Capacity"	Kirby Krackle	2010s	Pop-Rock	Sep 7, 2010	No	No
"Skate or Die"	Teenage Bottlerocket	2000s	Punk	Sep 7, 2010	No	No
"The Gun Show"	In This Moment	2010s	Metal	Sep 7, 2010	Nov 2, 2010	Dec 21, 2010
"The Pizza Morgana Song"	Hilit Rosental and Corbomite Games	2000s	Other	Sep 7, 2010	No	No
"United"	The Knew	2010s	Rock	Sep 7, 2010	No	No
"Latest Heartbreak"	22-20s	2010s	Alternative	Sep 9, 2010	No	No
"Modern Mathematics"	Terrorhorse	2010s	Metal	Sep 9, 2010	Feb 8, 2011	No
"Welcome to Our Town"	Stagehands	2000s	Pop-Rock	Sep 9, 2010	No	No
"World on Fire"	Firewind	2010s	Metal	Sep 9, 2010	Jun 2, 2011	No
"Your Hands (Together)"	The New Pornographers	2010s	Indie Rock	Sep 9, 2010	Mar 8, 2011	No
"Appetite"	The Gracious Few	2010s	Rock	Sep 10, 2010	Dec 21, 2010	No
"Burn"	Mike Orlando	2010s	Rock	Sep 10, 2010	No	No
"Dial M for Murder"	The Riptides	2000s	Punk	Sep 13, 2010	No	No
"Difference"	Rivethead	2000s	Metal	Sep 13, 2010	No	No
"Dirty Hair Party"	Pink Flag	2000s	Punk	Sep 13, 2010	No	No
"Erratic Eruption"	Freen in Green	2010s	Prog	Sep 13, 2010	No	No
"Hello Fascination"	Breathe Carolina	2000s	Other	Sep 13, 2010	Nov 2, 2010	Dec 21, 2010
"I Want You to See"	Justin Joseph Edwards	2010s	Jazz	Sep 13, 2010	No	No
"Radioland"	Audible Mainframe	2000s	Urban	Sep 13, 2010	Jun 2, 2011	No
"Stick Tight"	Terror	2010s	Punk	Sep 13, 2010	Jun 2, 2011	No
"The One You Want"	The Get Up Kids	2000s	Rock	Sep 13, 2010	Feb 22, 2011	No
"Army of the Damned"	Pythia	2000s	Metal	Sep 17, 2010	No	No
"I Couldn't Explain Why"	Citizen Cope	2010s	Rock	Sep 17, 2010	No	No
"I'm Amazed"	My Morning Jacket	2000s	Alternative	Sep 17, 2010	Jan 25, 2011	No
"Smash the Control Machine"	Otep	2000s	Metal	Sep 17, 2010	Nov 23, 2010	Dec 21, 2010
"Americadio"	Slim Cessna's Auto Club	2000s	Rock	Sep 20, 2010	No	No
"Chasing the Light"	Nautiluz	2010s	Metal	Sep 20, 2010	Jun 3, 2011	No
"Cup of Coffee"	The Novocaines	2000s	Rock	Sep 20, 2010	No	No
"Epic Symphony in A Flat Minor, First Movement: Marching Out"	Van Friscia	2010s	Prog	Sep 20, 2010	No	No
"Ready for Anything"	SexTon	2010s	Alternative	Sep 20, 2010	No	No
"Steppin' Lightly"	Gov't Mule	2000s	Rock	Sep 20, 2010	Feb 1, 2011	No
"Threads"	Barefoot Truth	2010s	Rock	Sep 20, 2010	No	No
"Holy Ground"	New Rising Son	2010s	New Wave	Sep 21, 2010	No	No
"Kiss Kiss Bang Bang"	Ultra Saturday	2010s	Punk	Sep 21, 2010	No	No
"Roman Candle"	Pink Flag	2000s	Punk	Sep 21, 2010	No	No
"Shiver"	Amy Courts	2000s	Pop-Rock	Sep 21, 2010	No	No
"999,999 Girls!"	Kiss the Girl	2000s	Pop-Rock	Sep 27, 2010	No	No
"Discharge"	Intricate Unit	2000s	Metal	Sep 27, 2010	No	No
"Elevator"	Kingsize	2000s	Rock	Sep 27, 2010	No	No
"Flightless Bird, American Mouth"	Iron & Wine	2000s	Other	Sep 27, 2010	Jan 18, 2011	No
"Giant Magnets"	Desoto Jones	2000s	Rock	Sep 27, 2010	No	No
"Hanuman"	Rodrigo y Gabriela	2000s	Rock	Sep 27, 2010	Nov 23, 2010	Dec 21, 2010
"Indulgence"	Self-Titled	2010s	Rock	Sep 27, 2010	No	No
"Light"	Shylo Elliott	2010s	Other	Sep 27, 2010	No	No
"Saint Simon"	The Shins	2000s	Indie Rock	Sep 27, 2010	Jan 11, 2011	No
"BBQ Nation"	Graveyard BBQ	2000s	Metal	Oct 1, 2010	No	No
"Bittersweet Melancholy"	Shylo Elliott	2010s	Other	Oct 1, 2010	No	No
"Dying Wish of a Living Man"	Yesternight's Decision	2010s	Rock	Oct 1, 2010	No	No
"Headed for the Ditch"	Andy Timmons	2000s	Country	Oct 1, 2010	No	No
"Laceration"	Mile Marker Zero	2000s	Prog	Oct 1, 2010	No	No
"Midnight Eyes"	Rose of Jericho	2010s	Pop-Rock	Oct 1, 2010	No	No
"Mrs. Right"	Last Day Off	2000s	Punk	Oct 1, 2010	No	No
"Thank You, Pain."	The Agonist	2000s	Metal	Oct 1, 2010	Jan 18, 2011	No
"Buttersnips"	Periphery	2010s	Metal	Oct 4, 2010	Jan 4, 2011	No
"Dirt"	Rain Dogs	2010s	Rock	Oct 4, 2010	No	No
"Electricity is in My Soul"	Steam Powered Giraffe	2000s	Rock	Oct 4, 2010	No	No
"Far Wanderings"	Shylo Elliott	2010s	Other	Oct 4, 2010	No	No
"High Class Trailer Trash"	Shelly Rastin feat. Randy Bachman	2000s	Country	Oct 4, 2010	No	No
"How We Operate"	Gomez	2000s	Rock	Oct 4, 2010	No	No
"Now or Never"	Confide	2010s	Metal	Oct 4, 2010	No	No
"Saga"	Amberian Dawn	2000s	Metal	Oct 4, 2010	Jun 3, 2011	No
"Warmachine"	The Sex Generals	2010s	Metal	Oct 4, 2010	No	No
"Arcaedion"	Children of Nova	2000s	Prog	Oct 8, 2010	Jan 18, 2011	No
"Chilly Water (Live)"	Widespread Panic	2000s	Rock	Oct 8, 2010	No	No
"Forgot Love"	Public Radio	2000s	Pop-Rock	Oct 8, 2010	No	No
"Girlfriend"	Shy Nobleman	2000s	Alternative	Oct 8, 2010	No	No
"Johnny Ace 2010"	Dash Rip Rock	2010s	Rock	Oct 8, 2010	No	No
"Rain"	New Rising Son	2010s	Rock	Oct 8, 2010	No	No
"Right to the Apex"	Single White Infidel	2010s	Punk	Oct 8, 2010	No	No
"Signed With Love"	Rose of Jericho	2010s	Pop-Rock	Oct 8, 2010	No	No
"Surprise Valley (Live)"	Widespread Panic	2000s	Rock	Oct 8, 2010	Apr 19, 2011	No
"The Deceiver"	I Am Abomination	2010s	Metal	Oct 8, 2010	No	No
"The Permanent Rain"	The Dangerous Summer	2000s	Alternative	Oct 8, 2010	No	No
"Bang Bang Bang"	The Virginmarys	2010s	Rock	Oct 12, 2010	No	No
"Daisy"	Fang Island	2010s	Indie Rock	Oct 12, 2010	No	No
"Old Lady Trouble"	Steve Fister	2000s	Blues	Oct 12, 2010	No	No
"Rotten Cat Halloween Rat"	Boney Mean	2010s	Punk	Oct 12, 2010	No	No
"Second & Sebring"	Of Mice & Men	2010s	Metal	Oct 12, 2010	Jan 4, 2011	Jan 4, 2011
"Spill"	Nushu	2000s	Pop-Rock	Oct 12, 2010	No	No
"Standing in Your Stuff"	Zigaboo Modeliste	2000s	Rock	Oct 12, 2010	No	No
"Wake Up"	Suicide Silence	2000s	Metal	Oct 12, 2010	Jan 4, 2011	Jan 11, 2011
"Antman"	The Red Chord	2000s	Metal	Oct 13, 2010	Feb 15, 2011	No
"Frostbite Cavern"	Wolfblur	2000s	Other	Oct 13, 2010	No	No
"Hand Me Down"	Visqueen	2000s	Rock	Oct 13, 2010	No	No
"Nihilanth"	Gatling	2000s	Metal	Oct 13, 2010	No	No
"Snowmaiden"	Amberian Dawn	2000s	Metal	Oct 13, 2010	Apr 19, 2011	No
"The Touch"	Stan Bush	2000s	Rock	Oct 13, 2010	Dec 21, 2010	Jan 4, 2011
"White Knuckles"	OK Go	2010s	Alternative	Oct 13, 2010	Jan 11, 2011	Jan 18, 2011
"All I Want"	Cosmic Tribe	2010s	Rock	Oct 18, 2010	No	No
"Drum Exercises for the Sufficiently Masochistic"	Shylo Elliott	2010s	Other	Oct 18, 2010	No	No
"I Thought I Knew You"	Those Among Us	2010s	New Wave	Oct 18, 2010	No	No
"Miss America"	Kingsize	2000s	Rock	Oct 18, 2010	No	No
"Philip K. Ridiculous"	Hugh Cornwell	2000s	Rock	Oct 18, 2010	No	No
"Refugee"	Scotty Don't	2000s	Rock	Oct 18, 2010	No	No
"Soulless"	Fake Problems	2010s	Indie Rock	Oct 18, 2010	No	No
"The Way You Move"	Since October	2010s	Rock	Oct 18, 2010	No	No
"Bullet with a Name"	Nonpoint	2000s	Nu-Metal	Oct 22, 2010	Jan 4, 2011	Jan 4, 2011
"Ceraunophobia"	Chaotrope	2010s	Metal	Oct 22, 2010	No	No
"Dark Horse"	Converge	2000s	Metal	Oct 22, 2010	Jan 25, 2011	No
"Gabrielle"	Ween	2000s	Alternative	Oct 22, 2010	Feb 1, 2011	No
"Ghost I Own"	(Damn) This Desert Air	2010s	Alternative	Oct 22, 2010	No	No
"P.W.M.O."	Shylo Elliott	2010s	Other	Oct 22, 2010	No	No
"The Countdown"	Cliff Lin	2010s	Nu-Metal	Oct 22, 2010	No	No
"The Waiting One"	All That Remains	2010s	Metal	Oct 22, 2010	Jan 4, 2011	No
"Worst Case Ontario"	The Roman Line	2000s	Country	Oct 22, 2010	No	No
"Curtain Call"	Nations Afire	2000s	Rock	Oct 28, 2010	No	No
"Fate of the Maiden"	Amberian Dawn	2000s	Metal	Oct 28, 2010	Feb 1, 2011	No
"Hold On"	All That Remains	2010s	Metal	Oct 28, 2010	Dec 21, 2010	No
"Industrialized"	Bluefusion	2000s	Prog	Oct 28, 2010	No	No
"Let Us Slay"	Gwar	2000s	Metal	Oct 28, 2010	Jan 11, 2011	No
"Ride the Stache"	Graveyard BBQ	2000s	Metal	Oct 28, 2010	No	No
"Runaway"	Lyrics for Monday	2000s	Punk	Oct 28, 2010	No	No
"Tantrums of a Giant"	Madlife	2010s	Metal	Oct 28, 2010	No	No
"Think Bad Thoughts"	Kay Hanley	2000s	Rock	Oct 28, 2010	No	No
"Vacation"	Mike Belotti & Theo Christensen	2010s	Indie Rock	Oct 28, 2010	No	No
"Veils"	Ludicra	2000s	Metal	Oct 28, 2010	No	No
"Baptized by Fire"	Chaotrope	2010s	Metal	Nov 2, 2010	No	No
"Bean"	Robby Suavé	2010s	Rock	Nov 2, 2010	No	No
"Berzerker"	After the Burial	2000s	Metal	Nov 2, 2010	Jan 25, 2011	No
"Jack and the Harlots"	The Asbestos	2010s	Rock	Nov 2, 2010	No	No
"Obfuscation"	Between the Buried and Me	2000s	Metal	Nov 2, 2010	Jan 4, 2011	No
"Robots May Break Your Heart"	Riverboat Gamblers	2000s	Punk	Nov 2, 2010	No	No
"Allegiance"	Blackguard	2000s	Metal	Nov 9, 2010	Jun 2, 2011	No
"Best I Never Had"	The Downtown Fiction	2010s	Alternative	Nov 9, 2010	Dec 14, 2010	No
"I Just Wanna Run"	The Downtown Fiction	2010s	Alternative	Nov 9, 2010	Dec 14, 2010	No
"Let It Change"	Mystic Syntax	2010s	Metal	Nov 9, 2010	No	No
"Smokahontas"	Attack Attack!	2010s	Metal	Nov 9, 2010	Jan 11, 2011	No
"Stevie"	Songs To Wear Pants To	2010s	Rock	Nov 9, 2010	No	No
"Better Sleep"	Fatter Than Albert	2000s	Rock	Nov 16, 2010	No	No
"For We Are Many"	All That Remains	2010s	Metal	Nov 16, 2010	Jan 25, 2011	No
"Linear A"	Free Electric State	2010s	Indie Rock	Nov 16, 2010	No	No
"Living Saints"	Polar Bear Club	2000s	Punk	Nov 16, 2010	No	No
"Oceans Between Us"	The Downtown Fiction	2010s	Alternative	Nov 16, 2010	Dec 14, 2010	No
"On Parole"	Sister Sin	2000s	Rock	Nov 16, 2010	Jun 2, 2011	No
"Spira Mirabilis"	Kodomo	2000s	Urban	Nov 16, 2010	No	No
"Two Minute Warning"	Hitman Blues Band	2000s	Blues	Nov 16, 2010	No	No
"A Christmas Rock Medley"	Richard Campbell	2000s	Rock	Nov 23, 2010	Jun 2, 2011	No
"Apocalypse for Breakfast"	Coelacanths	2010s	Other	Nov 23, 2010	No	No
"Beyond Grey"	Silent Descent	2000s	Metal	Nov 23, 2010	No	No
"Epitome of Misery"	Broken Equilibrium	2000s	Rock	Nov 23, 2010	No	No
"Fox Hunt"	Larkspur	2010s	New Wave	Nov 23, 2010	Jun 7, 2011	No
"I Still Feel Her, Part III"	Jonny Craig	2000s	Alternative	Nov 23, 2010	Feb 15, 2011	No
"Icon"	A t o m	2010s	New Wave	Nov 23, 2010	No	No
"Lay Kenneth Lay"	Felsen	2010s	Alternative	Nov 23, 2010	No	No
"Life Design"	The Parlotones	2000s	Alternative	Nov 23, 2010	No	No
"Numb & Intoxicated"	Kataklysm	2010s	Metal	Nov 23, 2010	Feb 22, 2011	No
"Phantom Limb"	The Shins	2000s	Indie Rock	Nov 23, 2010	Jan 25, 2011	No
"Shut Up"	The Early Strike	2010s	Punk	Nov 23, 2010	No	No
"A Fruit Fly in the Beehive"	Gang of Four	2010s	Punk	Nov 30, 2010	No	No
"Herlathing"	Morgawr	2010s	Metal	Nov 30, 2010	No	No
"Lemon Meringue Tie"	Dance Gavin Dance	2000s	Indie Rock	Nov 30, 2010	Apr 19, 2011	No
"One More Time"	Big Kenny	2000s	Country	Nov 30, 2010	No	No
"Alpha Strike"	Shylo Elliott	2010s	Metal	Dec 7, 2010	No	No
"Angels We Have Heard on High"	Cate Sparks	2010s	Rock	Dec 7, 2010	No	No
"Do You"	Portugal. The Man	2000s	Indie Rock	Dec 7, 2010	No	No
"Endzeit"	Heaven Shall Burn	2000s	Metal	Dec 7, 2010	Apr 19, 2011	No
"Flag in the Ground"	Sonata Arctica	2000s	Metal	Dec 7, 2010	Feb 15, 2011	No
"Have Faith in Me"	A Day to Remember	2000s	Punk	Dec 7, 2010	Feb 15, 2011	No
"Lipstick Cigarette"	The Last Good Year	2000s	Rock	Dec 7, 2010	No	No
"Lollytown"	Mike Phirman	2010s	Novelty	Dec 7, 2010	No	No
"Me Elevas"	Judy Buendía y Los Impostores	2000s	Rock	Dec 7, 2010	No	No
"Model Ships"	Rosaline	2010s	Punk	Dec 7, 2010	Jun 2, 2011	No
"November"	Broken Equilibrium	2000s	Rock	Dec 7, 2010	No	No
"Run Rabbit Run"	Hellfire Society	2000s	Metal	Dec 7, 2010	No	No
"Saw Down (He Knows)"	D Money Pros	2010s	Urban	Dec 7, 2010	No	No
"So Fine"	The Break Down	2000s	Urban	Dec 7, 2010	No	No
"Strobe Lights"	Kill Hannah	2000s	Alternative	Dec 7, 2010	No	No
"The Truth"	Kittie	2000s	Metal	Dec 7, 2010	Mar 8, 2011	No
"Alive and Kicking"	Nonpoint	2000s	Nu-Metal	Dec 9, 2010	Feb 15, 2011	No
"Drive"	Michael John Ahern	2010s	Country	Dec 9, 2010	No	No
"Fashion Kills"	Sabrosa Purr	2010s	Indie Rock	Dec 9, 2010	No	No
"Going Under"	Evanescence	2000s	Nu-Metal	Dec 9, 2010	Feb 8, 2011	No
"She's a Runaway"	Partially Poetic	2010s	Pop-Rock	Dec 9, 2010	No	No
"Unbound Soul"	Dan Johansen	2010s	Metal	Dec 9, 2010	No	No
"Vuvuzela Anthem"	Strayplay	2010s	Other	Dec 9, 2010	No	No
"10 Signs You Should Leave"	Emmure	2000s	Metal	Dec 14, 2010	Mar 15, 2011	No
"[&] Delinquents"	Woe, Is Me	2010s	Metal	Dec 14, 2010	Apr 12, 2011	No
"Catalyst"	Raven Quinn	2010s	Rock	Dec 14, 2010	No	No
"Creatures ov Deception"	Rainbowdragoneyes	2010s	Other	Dec 14, 2010	No	No
"Determined (Vows of Vengeance) (2x Bass Pedal)"	Kataklysm	2010s	Metal	Dec 14, 2010	No	No
"Do Yourself a Favor"	Comeback Kid	2010s	Punk	Dec 14, 2010	Jun 2, 2011	No
"Donuts, Go Nuts!"	Matt 'Chainsaw' Chaney	2000s	Indie Rock	Dec 14, 2010	No	No
"Escaping"	Driven By Entropy	2010s	Metal	Dec 14, 2010	No	No
"Fallen"	Rain Dogs	2010s	Rock	Dec 14, 2010	No	No
"Firewall"	Fear of Water	2000s	Nu-Metal	Dec 14, 2010	No	No
"Hallway"	Bojibian	2000s	Indie Rock	Dec 14, 2010	No	No
"Hey Baby, Here's That Song You Wanted"	Blessthefall	2000s	Alternative	Dec 14, 2010	Mar 1, 2011	No
"Jam"	Philip Franco	2010s	Rock	Dec 14, 2010	No	No
"Rescue Spreaders"	Garage A Trois	2000s	Indie Rock	Dec 14, 2010	No	No
"Stereo Stereo"	I Am King Tony	2010s	Punk	Dec 14, 2010	No	No
"Swallow My Children"	BS (A. Whiteman)	2010s	Novelty	Dec 14, 2010	No	No
"The Body"	Close Your Eyes	2010s	Punk	Dec 14, 2010	Jun 2, 2011	No
"The History of Execution (featuring Bluefusion)"	Single White Infidel	2010s	Punk	Dec 14, 2010	No	No
"The Hounds of Anubis"	The Word Alive	2010s	Metal	Dec 14, 2010	Feb 22, 2011	No
"(Lone Wolf) Soccer Mom"	Blanks.	2000s	Indie Rock	Dec 21, 2010	No	No
"Another Round"	Dirty Filthy Mugs	2010s	Punk	Dec 21, 2010	No	No
"Cimmerian Shamballa"	Wretched	2010s	Metal	Dec 21, 2010	Jun 2, 2011	No
"Esto ya lo Toqué Mañana"	Octavio Suñé	2010s	Pop-Rock	Dec 21, 2010	No	No
"Eternal Divine Angel Death"	Daas Bosh	2010s	Metal	Dec 21, 2010	No	No
"Gone Tomorrow"	Arkaea	2000s	Metal	Dec 21, 2010	No	No
"Iceblind"	Freen in Green	2010s	Other	Dec 21, 2010	No	No
"Lodger"	Blanks.	2000s	Indie Rock	Dec 21, 2010	No	No
"Lost"	John Garrison	2000s	Alternative	Dec 21, 2010	No	No
"No Pertenezco"	Incordiales	2010s	Rock	Dec 21, 2010	No	No
"OaOaO"	The Taj Motel Trio	2000s	Rock	Dec 21, 2010	No	No
"Party Like a Rock Star"	Big Engine	2000s	Rock	Dec 21, 2010	No	No
"Pouncer"	Blanks.	2000s	Indie Rock	Dec 21, 2010	No	No
"Power Patriot"	Garage A Trois	2000s	Indie Rock	Dec 21, 2010	No	No
"Princess (Reprise)"	Lee DeWyze	2010s	Pop-Rock	Dec 21, 2010	No	No
"Relentless Chaos"	Miss May I	2010s	Metal	Dec 21, 2010	Mar 1, 2011	No
"Splosion Man Theme Song"	Raging Meats	2000s	Rock	Dec 21, 2010	No	No
"Stay Awake"	Faithful Darkness	2000s	Metal	Dec 21, 2010	No	No
"Stop"	FeelAbouT	2010s	Pop-Rock	Dec 21, 2010	No	No
"The Brave / Agony Applause"	Deadlock	2000s	Metal	Dec 21, 2010	No	No
"The Clothes That Makes the Man"	Graveyard BBQ	2000s	Metal	Dec 21, 2010	No	No
"The Omen"	Heaven Shall Burn	2010s	Metal	Dec 21, 2010	Jun 2, 2011	No
"The Serpentine Offering"	Dimmu Borgir	2000s	Metal	Dec 21, 2010	Mar 1, 2011	No
"Vault 101"	Kirby Krackle	2010s	Pop-Rock	Dec 21, 2010	No	No
"What Morning Brings"	She Bears	2010s	Indie Rock	Dec 21, 2010	No	No
"Alpha Strike (2x Bass Pedal)"	Shylo Elliott	2010s	Metal	Dec 29, 2010	No	No
"Epic Symphony in A Flat Minor, Second Movement: Blitz"	Van Friscia	2010s	Prog	Dec 29, 2010	No	No
"Feast or Famine"	Within the Ruins	2010s	Metal	Dec 29, 2010	Apr 19, 2011	No
"Heart of Lilith 2010"	Inkubus Sukkubus	2010s	Glam	Dec 29, 2010	No	No
"Humanity's Last Hope..."	Massive Slavery	2010s	Metal	Dec 29, 2010	No	No
"Humanity's Last Hope... (2x Bass Pedal)"	Massive Slavery	2010s	Metal	Dec 29, 2010	No	No
"The Cold Taste of Nickel Plated Steel"	All Hallow's Evil	2000s	Metal	Dec 29, 2010	No	No
"Twister"	Scott Attrill	2000s	Other	Dec 29, 2010	No	No
"Burn (2x Bass Pedal)"	Mike Orlando	2010s	Rock	Jan 6, 2011	No	No
"Dawn of a Million Souls (Rock Band Mix)"	Ayreon	2000s	Prog	Jan 6, 2011	Jun 2, 2011	No
"Epitome of Misery (2x Bass Pedal)"	Broken Equilibrium	2000s	Rock	Jan 6, 2011	No	No
"Flag in the Ground (2x Bass Pedal)"	Sonata Arctica	2000s	Metal	Jan 6, 2011	No	No
"Fractured (Everything I Said Was True)"	Taproot	2010s	Rock	Jan 6, 2011	Jun 2, 2011	No
"November (2x Bass Pedal)"	Broken Equilibrium	2000s	Rock	Jan 6, 2011	No	No
"Queen of the May 2010"	Inkubus Sukkubus	2010s	Glam	Jan 6, 2011	No	No
"Special Effects"	Freezepop	2010s	New Wave	Jan 6, 2011	No	No
"The Fire and the Fury"	Firewind	2000s	Metal	Jan 6, 2011	Apr 12, 2011	No
"2 Invade (Stadium Mix)"	Scott Attrill	2000s	Other	Jan 10, 2011	No	No
"24-7"	The Pursuits	2010s	Indie Rock	Jan 10, 2011	No	No
"All I Want"	A Day to Remember	2010s	Punk	Jan 10, 2011	Mar 1, 2011	No
"Clockwork"	HourCast	2010s	Rock	Jan 10, 2011	No	No
"Creatures ov Deception (2x Bass Pedal)"	Rainbowdragoneyes	2010s	Other	Jan 10, 2011	No	No
"It's Complicated"	A Day to Remember	2010s	Punk	Jan 10, 2011	Mar 1, 2011	No
"Lindisfarne"	Morgawr	2010s	Metal	Jan 10, 2011	No	No
"Motorcide (2x Bass Pedal)"	Man Parts	2010s	Novelty	Jan 10, 2011	No	No
"Reaper"	Chaotrope	2010s	Metal	Jan 10, 2011	No	No
"The Healing"	Ivoryline	2010s	Rock	Jan 10, 2011	No	No
"Til All Are One"	Stan Bush	2000s	Rock	Jan 10, 2011	Apr 19, 2011	No
"Years in the Darkness"	Arkaea	2000s	Metal	Jan 10, 2011	No	No
"Battlesoul"	Battlesoul	2000s	Metal	Jan 11, 2011	No	No
"Control"	BulletProof Messenger	2000s	Rock	Jan 11, 2011	Mar 8, 2011	No
"Nocturnal Wasteland"	Freen in Green	2010s	Other	Jan 11, 2011	No	No
"Real"	Bumblefoot	2000s	Rock	Jan 11, 2011	No	No
"Stay Here Forever"	The Material	2010s	Pop-Rock	Jan 11, 2011	Mar 8, 2011	No
"The Pale Rider"	The Riptides	2000s	Rock	Jan 11, 2011	No	No
"Action/Adventure"	Memphis May Fire	2010s	Metal	Jan 13, 2011	Jun 3, 2011	No
"Angel"	Hellfire Society	2000s	Metal	Jan 13, 2011	No	No
"Forever the Martyr"	Dirge Within	2000s	Metal	Jan 13, 2011	No	No
"In Case You Forgot"	Deception of a Ghost	2010s	Metal	Jan 13, 2011	No	No
"La Fórmula"	Sintonía Retro	2010s	Rock	Jan 13, 2011	No	No
"N.A.T.G.O.D."	Dååth	2010s	Metal	Jan 13, 2011	Jun 2, 2011	No
"Numb & Intoxicated (2x Bass Pedal)"	Kataklysm	2010s	Metal	Jan 13, 2011	No	No
"Something Face"	Sun Domingo	2000s	Alternative	Jan 13, 2011	No	No
"Transmission Lost"	Terra Terra Terra	2000s	Alternative	Jan 13, 2011	No	No
"White Knuckles - The Big Robot Remix"	OK Go	2010s	Other	Jan 13, 2011	Jun 2, 2011	No
"A Slight Amplification"	Turrigenous	2000s	Metal	Jan 18, 2011	No	No
"All I Need"	Monte Casino	2010s	Rock	Jan 18, 2011	No	No
"At the Edge of the World"	Kataklysm	2010s	Metal	Jan 18, 2011	Jun 2, 2011	No
"Beauty is Deceiving"	Grieve for Tomorrow	2010s	Emo	Jan 18, 2011	No	No
"Beyond Grey (2x Bass Pedal)"	Silent Descent	2000s	Metal	Jan 18, 2011	No	No
"Brand New Toy"	Blackberry River Band	2000s	Pop-Rock	Jan 18, 2011	No	No
"Caíamos"	Octavio Suñé	2010s	Pop-Rock	Jan 18, 2011	No	No
"Call Me"	The Riptides	2000s	Punk	Jan 18, 2011	No	No
"Call to the Warrior"	Affiance	2010s	Metal	Jan 18, 2011	No	No
"Creamskull Boogie"	Graveyard BBQ	2000s	Metal	Jan 18, 2011	No	No
"Enemy"	First Blood	2010s	Punk	Jan 18, 2011	No	No
"Falling Apart"	BSM	2010s	Rock	Jan 18, 2011	No	No
"Hundred Wrathful Deities"	Evile	2000s	Metal	Jan 18, 2011	No	No
"It's Gonna Be a Long Night"	Ween	2000s	Rock	Jan 18, 2011	Jun 2, 2011	No
"Jamie All Over"	Mayday Parade	2000s	Rock	Jan 18, 2011	Apr 12, 2011	No
"Just Refrain"	Orange Avenue	2000s	Pop-Rock	Jan 18, 2011	No	No
"Livin' Right"	DoubleShot	2000s	Rock	Jan 18, 2011	No	No
"Lullaby"	Amberian Dawn	2000s	Metal	Jan 18, 2011	No	No
"Marianas Trench"	August Burns Red	2000s	Metal	Jan 18, 2011	No	No
"Marianas Trench (2x Bass Pedal)"	August Burns Red	2000s	Metal	Jan 18, 2011	No	No
"Morning Star"	Amberian Dawn	2000s	Metal	Jan 18, 2011	No	No
"Nightfall"	Nachtmystium	2010s	Metal	Jan 18, 2011	Jun 2, 2011	No
"Nocturnal Wasteland (2x Bass Pedal)"	Freen in Green	2010s	Other	Jan 18, 2011	No	No
"Rompecabezas"	Judy Buendía y Los Impostores	2000s	Rock	Jan 18, 2011	No	No
"Sexual Man Chocolate"	Attack Attack!	2010s	Metal	Jan 18, 2011	Apr 12, 2011	No
"Sunrise"	Amberian Dawn	2000s	Metal	Jan 18, 2011	No	No
"The Fall of Aphonia"	Children of Nova	2000s	Prog	Jan 18, 2011	Jun 7, 2011	No
"The King is Dead"	Victory in Numbers	2010s	Pop-Rock	Jan 18, 2011	No	No
"The Podium"	We Are The Illusion	2000s	Metal	Jan 18, 2011	No	No
"Those in Glass Houses"	Of Mice & Men	2010s	Metal	Jan 18, 2011	Apr 12, 2011	No
"We Are Kings"	Crush Luther	2000s	Pop-Rock	Jan 18, 2011	No	No
"We Collide"	Children of Nova	2000s	Prog	Jan 18, 2011	Jun 7, 2011	No
"Abrogator"	Six-Stringed Flamberge	2000s	Rock	Jan 20, 2011	No	No
"Autumns of Optimism"	Mystakin	2000s	Prog	Jan 20, 2011	No	No
"Cheyne Stokes"	Chelsea Grin	2010s	Metal	Jan 20, 2011	No	No
"Coat Rack"	Ride Your Bike	2010s	Indie Rock	Jan 20, 2011	No	No
"Cursing Akhenaten"	After the Burial	2000s	Metal	Jan 20, 2011	Jun 2, 2011	No
"Decadence"	Raven Quinn	2010s	Rock	Jan 20, 2011	No	No
"Dog Like Vultures"	Haste the Day	2000s	Metal	Jan 20, 2011	No	No
"Dominate and Overload"	Fracture	2010s	Metal	Jan 20, 2011	No	No
"Lexington (Joey Pea-Pot With a Monkey Face)"	Chiodos	2000s	Emo	Jan 20, 2011	Apr 12, 2011	No
"New Revolution"	The Waking Hours	2000s	Rock	Jan 20, 2011	No	No
"Second Sight Blackout"	Children of Nova	2000s	Prog	Jan 20, 2011	Jun 7, 2011	No
"Shorty On The Floor"	Horporate	2010s	Urban	Jan 20, 2011	No	No
"The Last Gasp"	Impaled	2000s	Metal	Jan 20, 2011	No	No
"The Resonance"	Decrepit Birth	2010s	Metal	Jan 20, 2011	Jun 2, 2011	No
"Undead Heart"	Vampires Everywhere!	2010s	Metal	Jan 20, 2011	Jun 2, 2011	No
"Whites in Their Eyes"	Fiction Reform	2010s	Punk	Jan 20, 2011	No	No
"XIV (2x Bass Pedal)"	Chaotrope	2010s	Metal	Jan 20, 2011	No	No
"Years in the Darkness (2x Bass Pedal)"	Arkaea	2000s	Metal	Jan 20, 2011	No	No
"5678"	Fake Problems	2010s	Indie Rock	Jan 25, 2011	No	No
"Abraxas of Filth"	Cephalic Carnage	2010s	Metal	Jan 25, 2011	No	No
"An Eluardian Instance"	of Montreal	2000s	Indie Rock	Jan 25, 2011	No	No
"Black and Sunny Day"	Glitzy Glow	2000s	Rock	Jan 25, 2011	No	No
"Blasphemous"	Mystic Syntax	2010s	Metal	Jan 25, 2011	No	No
"California"	Nova	2010s	Rock	Jan 25, 2011	No	No
"Closer to the Sun"	Slightly Stoopid	2000s	Rock	Jan 25, 2011	No	No
"Come On In"	The Pinstripes	2000s	Rock	Jan 25, 2011	No	No
"Goin' Home"	KickBend	2010s	Rock	Jan 25, 2011	No	No
"Hand Me Down"	Bright Midnight	2010s	Rock	Jan 25, 2011	No	No
"Hanging By a Thread"	Jeff Orr	2000s	Rock	Jan 25, 2011	No	No
"Hotel Saigon"	Bright Midnight	2010s	Rock	Jan 25, 2011	No	No
"Icarus Lives"	Periphery	2010s	Metal	Jan 25, 2011	Jun 2, 2011	No
"If I'm James Dean, You're Audrey Hepburn"	Sleeping with Sirens	2010s	Emo	Jan 25, 2011	Jun 2, 2011	No
"Killers of the Worst Type"	Bright Midnight	2000s	Rock	Jan 25, 2011	No	No
"Learn to Live"	Architects	2010s	Metal	Jan 25, 2011	Jun 2, 2011	No
"Lift"	Poets of the Fall	2000s	Rock	Jan 25, 2011	No	No
"Lost Boys"	MyChildren MyBride	2010s	Metal	Jan 25, 2011	No	No
"Metamorphosis"	Evile	2000s	Metal	Jan 25, 2011	No	No
"My Parasite"	Evile	2000s	Metal	Jan 25, 2011	No	No
"New Addiction"	Dark From Day One	2010s	Alternative	Jan 25, 2011	No	No
"On the Wall"	Molehill	2000s	Indie Rock	Jan 25, 2011	No	No
"One-Night-Stand Man"	Daryle Stephen Ackerman	2000s	Pop-Rock	Jan 25, 2011	No	No
"Samiam"	Mafia Track Suit	2010s	Alternative	Jan 25, 2011	No	No
"Sons of Seven Stars"	Amberian Dawn	2000s	Metal	Jan 25, 2011	No	No
"Step on the Throat"	C&O	2000s	Rock	Jan 25, 2011	No	No
"The Brave / Agony Applause (2x Bass Pedal)"	Deadlock	2000s	Metal	Jan 25, 2011	No	No
"The Fire and the Fury (2x Bass Pedal)"	Firewind	2000s	Metal	Jan 25, 2011	No	No
"The Order"	Children of Nova	2000s	Prog	Jan 25, 2011	Jun 7, 2011	No
"Arm Yourself"	BulletProof Messenger	2000s	Rock	Jan 28, 2011	Jun 3, 2011	No
"Aspiration"	After the Burial	2000s	Metal	Jan 28, 2011	No	No
"Butcher's Mouth"	Emery	2000s	Rock	Jan 28, 2011	No	No
"Coolguy Deluxe!"	Kid Liberty	2010s	Punk	Jan 28, 2011	No	No
"Holiday"	The Night Life	2000s	Punk	Jan 28, 2011	No	No
"My Wings Are My Eyes"	Amberian Dawn	2000s	Metal	Jan 28, 2011	No	No
"Ode to Logan"	No Bragging Rights	2000s	Punk	Jan 28, 2011	No	No
"Pandemonium"	Chaotrope	2010s	Metal	Jan 28, 2011	No	No
"The December Experience"	Lnk. Ken Kardashian	2010s	Metal	Jan 28, 2011	No	No
"ZTO"	Devin Townsend	2000s	Metal	Jan 28, 2011	No	No
"All or Nothing"	Cauldron	2010s	Metal	Feb 1, 2011	No	No
"Around the World"	Robby Suavé	2000s	Rock	Feb 1, 2011	No	No
"At the Edge of the World (2x Bass Pedal)"	Kataklysm	2010s	Metal	Feb 1, 2011	No	No
"Bang"	Rockapella	2010s	Other	Feb 1, 2011	No	No
"Barricades"	Lucid Grey	2010s	Rock	Feb 1, 2011	No	No
"Bend"	New West	2000s	Indie Rock	Feb 1, 2011	No	No
"Betrayed"	Chaotrope	2010s	Metal	Feb 1, 2011	No	No
"Big Bad World One"	Jonathan Coulton	2000s	Rock	Feb 1, 2011	No	No
"Bitten by the Rattlesnake"	Admiral of Black	2000s	Rock	Feb 1, 2011	No	No
"Bizarro Genius Baby"	MC Frontalot	2000s	Urban	Feb 1, 2011	No	No
"Bullet on a String"	Rotary Downs	2010s	Indie Rock	Feb 1, 2011	No	No
"Cluster #2"	Jacob Chaney	2010s	Other	Feb 1, 2011	No	No
"Couch Sitting Rattlesnake"	Stuedabakerbrown	2010s	Indie Rock	Feb 1, 2011	No	No
"Fighting Spirit"	Bluefusion	2000s	Prog	Feb 1, 2011	No	No
"Firehouse Bar"	Kylie D. Hart	2010s	Country	Feb 1, 2011	No	No
"For the Strange"	Bright Midnight	2000s	Rock	Feb 1, 2011	No	No
"Hassle: The Dorkening"	MC Frontalot	2000s	Urban	Feb 1, 2011	No	No
"Hate to Say"	Common Anomaly	2000s	Punk	Feb 1, 2011	No	No
"I Gotta Ride 2010"	Sam Morrison Band	2010s	Southern Rock	Feb 1, 2011	No	No
"King of Frauds"	With Life in Mind	2010s	Metal	Feb 1, 2011	No	No
"Last Suppit"	Lettuce	2000s	Rock	Feb 1, 2011	No	No
"Light Up The Eyes"	These Three Poisons	2000s	Metal	Feb 1, 2011	No	No
"Live to Rock"	Sideburn	2010s	Rock	Feb 1, 2011	No	No
"Mind Diary"	Cloudscape	2000s	Metal	Feb 1, 2011	No	No
"Plátanos Con Sangre"	Zakk Tremblay	2010s	Metal	Feb 1, 2011	No	No
"Promised Land"	Rotary Downs	2010s	Indie Rock	Feb 1, 2011	No	No
"Pylo the Pylon"	Alternative Deficit Disorder	2000s	Novelty	Feb 1, 2011	No	No
"Radios Tweaking"	Felsen	2000s	Alternative	Feb 1, 2011	No	No
"Secondary Gain"	Abraham Nixon	2010s	Rock	Feb 1, 2011	No	No
"Steven Wells (He Was the Greatest)"	Akira the Don	2000s	Punk	Feb 1, 2011	No	No
"Strong Tower"	Kutless	2000s	Rock	Feb 1, 2011	No	No
"Too Much"	Soulive	2000s	Pop-Rock	Feb 1, 2011	No	No
"Triceratops"	Big Light	2010s	Indie Rock	Feb 1, 2011	No	No
"Two Utensils In One"	Felsen	2000s	Alternative	Feb 1, 2011	No	No
"Volver a Nacer"	Arena	2010s	Punk	Feb 1, 2011	No	No
"You Don't Know"	The Moth Complex	2010s	Pop-Rock	Feb 1, 2011	No	No
"ZTO (2x Bass Pedal)"	Devin Townsend	2000s	Metal	Feb 1, 2011	No	No
"A Fresh Start"	Mystakin	2010s	Prog	Feb 3, 2011	No	No
"Abigail"	Motionless in White	2010s	Metal	Feb 3, 2011	Jun 2, 2011	No
"Crinoline"	CyLeW	2000s	Alternative	Feb 3, 2011	No	No
"District of Misery"	Oceano	2000s	Metal	Feb 3, 2011	No	No
"Fighting Spirit (2x Bass Pedal)"	Bluefusion	2000s	Prog	Feb 3, 2011	No	No
"For You"	Maplerun	2010s	Nu-Metal	Feb 3, 2011	No	No
"Forever the Martyr (2x Bass Pedal)"	Dirge Within	2000s	Metal	Feb 3, 2011	No	No
"Lamnidae"	This or the Apocalypse	2010s	Metal	Feb 3, 2011	No	No
"Painprovider"	Cosmic Ballroom	2000s	Metal	Feb 3, 2011	No	No
"Rational Animal/Layered Line"	Kiev	2000s	Alternative	Feb 3, 2011	No	No
"Refraction"	Ricky Graham	2000s	Metal	Feb 3, 2011	No	No
"Seed of Discord"	Hellfire Society	2000s	Metal	Feb 3, 2011	No	No
"Skid Rock"	A Wilhelm Scream	2000s	Punk	Feb 3, 2011	No	No
"Supernova"	High Voltage	2010s	Rock	Feb 3, 2011	No	No
"Tea and Taxes"	Jenium	2000s	Indie Rock	Feb 3, 2011	No	No
"Voodoo Treasure"	Majestic	2000s	Metal	Feb 3, 2011	No	No
"We Are But Instruments"	Where the Ocean Meets the Sky	2010s	Metal	Feb 3, 2011	No	No
"Your Treachery Will Die with You"	Dying Fetus	2000s	Metal	Feb 3, 2011	No	No
"Your Treachery Will Die with You (2x Bass Pedal)"	Dying Fetus	2000s	Metal	Feb 3, 2011	No	No
"Lights Out"	Minutes Like Ours	2010s	Rock	Feb 4, 2011	No	No
"Live for Today"	Enemy Remains	2000s	Rock	Feb 4, 2011	No	No
"The Podium (2x Bass Pedal)"	We Are The Illusion	2000s	Metal	Feb 4, 2011	No	No
"Abraxas of Filth (2x Bass Pedal)"	Cephalic Carnage	2010s	Metal	Feb 8, 2011	No	No
"Burn"	Captor	2000s	Nu-Metal	Feb 8, 2011	No	No
"Come Outside"	Anybody Who's Anybody	2010s	Rock	Feb 8, 2011	No	No
"Disco Ball"	Those Among Us	2010s	Rock	Feb 8, 2011	No	No
"Passion of My Life"	Perfect Hero	2010s	Metal	Feb 8, 2011	No	No
"Septilogy"	Chaotrope	2010s	Metal	Feb 8, 2011	No	No
"Shed the Blood"	Nightrage	2000s	Metal	Feb 8, 2011	No	No
"Spyglass"	Lost in the Crawlspace	2000s	Punk	Feb 8, 2011	No	No
"The Collapse of Men"	With Life in Mind	2010s	Metal	Feb 8, 2011	No	No
"The Resonance (2x Bass Pedal)"	Decrepit Birth	2010s	Metal	Feb 8, 2011	No	No
"Afflicted"	The Fetals	2000s	Metal	Feb 15, 2011	No	No
"Becoming Blue"	Moving Atlas	2010s	Prog	Feb 15, 2011	No	No
"Berzerker (2x Bass Pedal)"	After the Burial	2000s	Metal	Feb 15, 2011	No	No
"Close to Home"	Jenium	2000s	Indie Rock	Feb 15, 2011	No	No
"Collision of Fate"	Nightrage	2000s	Metal	Feb 15, 2011	No	No
"Cool As the Other Side of the Pillow"	The Cold Goodnight	2000s	Alternative	Feb 15, 2011	No	No
"Creative Warrior"	DoubleShot	2000s	Rock	Feb 15, 2011	No	No
"Cursing Akhenaten (2x Bass Pedal)"	After the Burial	2000s	Metal	Feb 15, 2011	No	No
"Damnation"	Warpath	2000s	Metal	Feb 15, 2011	No	No
"Dark Lord"	Fallen Angel	2010s	Metal	Feb 15, 2011	No	No
"Enemy"	Stop the World	2010s	Rock	Feb 15, 2011	No	No
"Everyone's the Same"	The B.O.L.T.	2000s	Indie Rock	Feb 15, 2011	No	No
"Fight"	Midnight Sun	2000s	Metal	Feb 15, 2011	No	No
"Fly on the Wall"	Minnesota Sex Junkies	2000s	Rock	Feb 15, 2011	No	No
"Freeze Frame"	Super Gravity	2010s	Rock	Feb 15, 2011	No	No
"Hate Myself"	Minnesota Sex Junkies	2000s	Indie Rock	Feb 15, 2011	No	No
"Here Comes Tomorrow"	C&O	2000s	Rock	Feb 15, 2011	No	No
"Hey You"	Gabriel and the Apocalypse	2000s	Glam	Feb 15, 2011	No	No
"Homeless"	The B.O.L.T.	2000s	Indie Rock	Feb 15, 2011	No	No
"I Can't Explain It"	Analogue Revolution feat. Bryan Steele	2000s	Rock	Feb 15, 2011	No	No
"I Cannibal"	Calous	2010s	Metal	Feb 15, 2011	No	No
"I Want It Back"	Minnesota Sex Junkies	2000s	Rock	Feb 15, 2011	No	No
"Insanity of the Atoms"	Hedras Ramos	2010s	Metal	Feb 15, 2011	No	No
"Leap of Faith"	Analogue Revolution feat. Wendy Drown	2000s	Pop-Rock	Feb 15, 2011	No	No
"Life is a Roller Coaster"	Evan Olson	2000s	Pop-Rock	Feb 15, 2011	No	No
"Like This"	Minnesota Sex Junkies	2000s	Indie Rock	Feb 15, 2011	No	No
"Lose It All"	BulletProof Messenger	2000s	Rock	Feb 15, 2011	No	No
"My Warning"	Severed	2010s	Metal	Feb 15, 2011	No	No
"Nothing Ever Comes"	The B.O.L.T.	2000s	Indie Rock	Feb 15, 2011	No	No
"Opening in G"	Kiev	2000s	Alternative	Feb 15, 2011	No	No
"Other Personality"	Hip Kitty	2000s	Rock	Feb 15, 2011	No	No
"Peace of Mind"	The Break Down	2000s	Urban	Feb 15, 2011	No	No
"R U Ready For This"	Analogue Revolution feat. Bryan Steele	2000s	Rock	Feb 15, 2011	No	No
"Railway Station"	The Lightfighters	2000s	Rock	Feb 15, 2011	No	No
"The Girl Next Door"	Something Opus	2000s	Indie Rock	Feb 15, 2011	No	No
"The Ones Who Get It"	Action Action	2010s	Alternative	Feb 15, 2011	No	No
"The Stranger"	Bright Midnight	2000s	Rock	Feb 15, 2011	No	No
"The Ultimate Power"	Severed	2010s	Metal	Feb 15, 2011	No	No
"This Fantasy"	BulletProof Messenger	2000s	Rock	Feb 15, 2011	Jun 3, 2011	No
"Trailer Park Scum"	Stereoside	2010s	Rock	Feb 15, 2011	No	No
"Wearing a Martyr's Crown"	Nightrage	2000s	Metal	Feb 15, 2011	No	No
"What Is Light? Where Is Laughter?"	Twin Atlantic	2000s	Alternative	Feb 15, 2011	No	No
"What's a Man to Do?"	DoubleShot	2000s	Rock	Feb 15, 2011	No	No
"You Don't Know Me"	God in a Machine	2010s	Metal	Feb 15, 2011	No	No
