= Gatling (disambiguation) =

The Gatling gun was one of the first rapid-fire weapons and a modern class of rotary cannon.

Gatling may also refer to:

== Surname ==
- Bart Gatling (1871-1950), American football coach
- Chris Gatling (born 1967), American basketball player
- Markeisha Gatling (born 1992), American basketball player
- Richard Jordan Gatling (1818–1903), American inventor who invented the Gatling gun

== Other uses ==
- Gatling Gun (film), the 1968 Italian-Spanish Spaghetti Western film
- The Gatling Gun, the 1969 film originally entitled King Gun, and released in 1971
- Gatling (software), open-source load testing framework base
- USS Gatling (DD-671), a U.S. Navy Fletcher-class destroyer named for Dr. Richard Jordan Gatling
- Kill No Albatross, a Canadian band formerly known as Gatling
