= Simmer in Your Hotseat =

Studio album by The Main Drag
- Released: 7 February 2005
- Genre: Indie rock
- Length: 43:31
- Label: Endless Recordings

The Main Drag chronology
Simmer in Your Hotseat (2005)	Yours as Fast as Mine (2007)

Simmer in Your Hotseat is the debut album by Boston-based band The Main Drag, originally released on indie label Endless Recordings in 2004. The album was self-recorded by Adam Arrigo while still in college, with assistance from Matt Levitt (violin and string arrangements) and contributions from various guest musicians.

== Background ==
Arrigo and Levitt had been collaborating for over three years, and following the successful recording of "Admit One", they began producing their debut record. With the assistance of local producers and musicians, Arrigo produced Simmer In Your Hotseat over the summer of 2004, drawing on material spanning two years. During this time, Arrigo was employed full-time at a local mental hospital in Lynn, MA, where he led exercise and music groups for patients with schizophrenia, head injuries and other conditions. The album title was inspired by an exercise tape, Sittercise, which Arrigo used in his morning groups. The tape professed activities such as: "Ride your bicycle and milk that cow!" But there was one command that no one seemed to understand: "There's hot oil on your seat...simmer! Simmer in your hot seat!" This command thrust the room into mass confusion, and the tape insisted on returning to it: "Alright, you're done riding that donkey? Let's simmer again!" While the origin of this title is quite ridiculous, it reflects the album's recurring themes of different types of debilitation.

Endless Recordings, The Main Drag's label at the time, arranged for the band to open for Arcade Fire in November, 2004. In 2005, a video was made for the song Famous Last Words, starring Adam Arrigo, Cory Levitt, Nate Reticker-Flynn, and Tom Keidel.

== Track listing ==
All songs written and produced by Adam Arrigo, except "I'll Drink to That" (Arrigo/Le-Khac).

1. "North Shore, Music Therapist" - 4:46
2. "Broken Clocks" - 4:11
3. "Admit One" - 4:46
4. "Tunnel Lights" - 3:41
5. "Tax Season" - 4:09
6. "Bicycle Paths and Crosswalks" - 2:59
7. "Withhold" - 4:50
8. "Famous Last Words" - 4:23
9. "Disappointed You" - 4:46
10. "I’ll Drink to That" - 5:00

== Personnel ==
- Adam Arrigo: vocals, guitars, drums (tracks 3, 5, 9)
- Matt Levitt: violin/arrangements, backup vocals (track 9)
- Cory Levitt: bass (tracks 1, 4, 8)
- Omar Tuffaha: bass (tracks 2, 3, 5, 7)
- Long Le-Khac: bass (tracks 9, 10), keyboard (track 10)
- Nate Reticker-Flynn: drums (tracks 2, 7, 8)
- Richard Wilner: drums (tracks 1, 4, 10)
- Brett Hitchner: keyboard (tracks 4, 8)
- Patrick Mangan: Irish fiddle (track 7)
- Ellen Gorra: cello (track 3)
- Eric Adler: banjo (track 9)
- Dan Cardinal: bass (track 5)
- Recording and mixing: Adam Arrigo
- Mastering: Sid Obando
- Artwork by Matthew Lauprete, CD art by Gordon Cieplak
