= Yours as Fast as Mine =

Studio album by The Main Drag
- Released: 28 June 2007 (Digital); 19 July 2007 (CD)
- Genre: Indie pop
- Length: 44:56
- Label: RPL Audio

The Main Drag chronology
Simmer in Your Hotseat (2004)	Yours as Fast as Mine (2007)	You Are Underwater (2009)

Professional ratings
Review scores
Source	Rating
Cokemachineglow	(82%)
PopMatters	(7/10)

Yours as Fast as Mine is the second LP album by Boston band The Main Drag which was released in June 2007 on the band's own imprint, Reasonable People's League (RPL Audio), after being in the making for 2 years. The album was able to be financed after the band won the Salon.com National Song Search Contest in 2006, gaining the $5,000 grand prize. Matt Levitt left The Main Drag after the release of Yours As Fast As Mine.

== Trivia ==
The song A Jagged Gorgeous Winter was included in Rock Band 2 as a playable song on the disc and also on a Target commercial for Rock Band 2. This helped to bring the band to wider public attention. The version of A Jagged Gorgeous Winter included on Rock Band 2 was a remix that Jon Carter and Adam Arrigo made, adding extra guitar flourishes and a short drum break to make the song more enjoyable to play in the game.(The drum break can be heard right before the lyrics "Got A Jagged Gorgeous Winter from the Summer's thread", or 2:32 to 2:36 in the official Video on YouTube) The remix tends to be the version that is now played live, and it is also the version for which the official video was released.

Love During Wartime was featured on The Guild as the outro to the final episode of the second season. The song was also included on Paste Magazine's CD sampler in February 2008.

Arrigo recorded Car Windows, Swine Houses, and Taking Apart a Gigantic Machine while he was working with post-punk band Blanks. during the production of their first EP. While under their influence, he began to incorporate elements of their style into his songs.

What's Yr Favorite Dinosaur? has a guitar hook that references the Jurassic Park theme.

Goodnight Technologist was on Knocks From The Underground: The Best of Underplayed Boston, a compilation of bands local to Boston who deserve more attention. The compilation was released by the band's previous label, Endless Recordings.

Yours As Fast As Mine launched on the Rock Band Network in late 2009, a system designed by Harmonix to allow artists to make their music available to purchase and play in the video game Rock Band.

== Music videos ==
The original video for A Jagged Gorgeous Winter was shot and edited within 24 hours by John Drake, the band's drummer. It was released in January 2007, and filmed in the same place the song was originally recorded - exactly one year later.

In summer 2009, a music video was made for A Jagged Gorgeous Winter ("Rock Band 2" Remix) which was directed by Isaac Ravishankara. The video featured a prominent homage to the comic strip Calvin and Hobbes, with Arrigo dressed as Calvin and Boch as Hobbes. The band has said that there are plans for music videos for the tracks Love During Wartime and Talk Them Down.

The Main Drag worked with French-Swiss directors Ben & Julia to create a surreal and psychedelic music video for the song Dove Nets (from Yours As Fast As Mine) which was released in November 2009. The music video was accompanied by a website, Dove Lovers , which featured behind-the-scenes information and other bonus features.

== Track listing ==
1. "How We'd Look on Paper" – 4:31
2. "Swine Houses" – 4:12
3. "A Jagged Gorgeous Winter" – 3:51
4. "Love During Wartime" – 4:07
5. "Car Windows" – 3:27
6. "Montana" – 3:25
7. "What's Your Favorite Dinosaur?" – 3:26
8. "Dove Nets" – 2:53
9. "Taking Apart a Gigantic Machine" – 4:54
10. "Even Seconds" – 4:51
11. "Goodnight Technologist" – 5:25

== Personnel ==
- Adam Arrigo: vocals, production/programming, guitar, keyboard, glockenspiel
- Maxi Boch: vocals, guitar, bass, keyboard, trumpet
- Jon Carter: guitar, bass, keyboard
- John Drake: drums
- Matt Levitt: violin/string arrangements
- Dan Cardinal: bass, engineering
- Tom Keidel: trumpet (track 1), guitar (track 2)
- Molly Lorenzo: marimba (track 1), additional songwriting (track 4), backing vocals (track 8), wine glasses (track 10)
- Rich Wilner: drums (track 2)
- Sweatpants and Zach Robbins: backing vocals (track 2)
- Debbie Neigher: backing vocals (track 3, 7)
- Max Lewis: programming (track 4), shaker (track 6), additional programming (track 6)
- Cory Levitt: bass (track 5)
- Sarah Arrigo: backing vocals (track 9)
- Erina Suto: cello (track 9)
- Omar Tuffaha: double bass (track 9)
- Nate Raticker-Flynn: drums (track 9)
- Andy Zimmerman: cello (track 10)
- Jim Devane: additional sound manipulation (track 11)
- All tracks recorded, produced, and mixed by The Main Drag
- Mastered by Jeff Lipton at Peerless Mastering
- Artwork by Hayes Roberts, CD artwork by Molly Lorenzo
