= You Are Underwater =

Studio album by The Main Drag
- Released: 8 December 2009 (Digital); 7 January 2010 (CD)
- Genre: Indie pop
- Length: 30:30
- Label: RPL Audio

The Main Drag chronology
Yours as Fast as Mine (2007)	You Are Underwater (2009)

Professional ratings
Review scores
Source	Rating
CWG Magazine	3.5/5 stars
Metromix	2/5 stars
Campus Circle	(C)
Wonka Vision	4/5 stars

You Are Underwater is the third album by the Main Drag, released in December 2009. Like the band's previous LP, You Are Underwater was also self-recorded and self-released on the band's own imprint - Reasonable People's League (RPL Audio). Prior to the release of the CD, the album was digitally pre-released in December 2009. On the CD release day of You Are Underwater in January 2010, The Main Drag announced on their website that bandmate Adam Arrigo would be leaving the band in order to pursue other things. He played his final show with the band at the CD release for You Are Underwater. The CD release of the band's third album was held alongside the debut release of fellow RPL Audio band Spirit Kid.

The whole album was released on the Rock Band Network when it launched in March 2010, allowing users and fans to purchase and play the songs in the video game Rock Band. The group intends to eventually begin releasing the album in the form of remixable stems for others to create their own remixes, much like they are currently doing with Yours As Fast As Mine.

== Trivia ==
A Jagged Gorgeous Winter (Rock Band 2 Mix) is included as a bonus track on the album. While the original song was on the band's previous album, Yours As Fast As Mine, this track is the version of A Jagged Gorgeous Winter included on Rock Band 2. It is a remix made by Jon Carter and Adam Arrigo, adding extra guitar flourishes and a short drum break in an effort to make the song arguably more enjoyable to play in the game. The remix tends to be the version that is now played live, and it is also the version for which the official video was released.

In summer 2009, a music video was made for A Jagged Gorgeous Winter (Rock Band 2 Mix) which was directed by Isaac Ravishankara. The video featured a prominent homage to the comic strip Calvin and Hobbes, with Arrigo dressed as Calvin and Boch as Hobbes. A music video for Talk Them Down has also been mentioned, but the status of the video is currently unknown.

A music video for the song "Cease and Desist" was released in March 2010. It was shot and directed by Nick Ahrens of Game Informer Magazine. The video was filmed in Minnesota and features shots taken at a mutual friends home in Minneapolis and from a live performance by The Main Drag at Minneapolis' Fine Line during their Summer 2009 National Tour.

== Track listing ==
1. "Homosuperior" - 3:41
2. "Tricky Girl" - 2:58
3. "Don't Let Me Down (Slowly)" - 3:27
4. "Talk Them Down" - 4:16
5. "Megatron" - 3:26
6. "Cease And Desist" - 4:41
7. "Teeth, Face, Outerspace" - 4:01
8. "A Jagged Gorgeous Winter (Rock Band 2 Mix)" (Bonus Track) - 4:00

== Personnel ==
- Adam Arrigo: vocals, production/programming, guitar, keyboard, glockenspiel
- Maxi Boch: vocals, guitar, bass, keyboard, trumpet
- Dan Cardinal: bass, engineering
- Jon Carter: guitar, bass, vocals, keyboard
- John Drake: drums, sampler, vocals
- Recorded and Mixed by The Main Drag
- Mastered by Jeff Lipton at Peerless Mastering, Boston, MA
- Assistant Mastering Engineer: Maria Rice
- Design by Aaron Bouvier
