= Live Inferno =

Live album by Emperor
- Released: 20 April 2009
- Recorded: 2006
- Length: 1:19:00
- Label: Candlelight Records
- Producer: Thorbjorn Akkerhaugen and Emperor

Emperor chronology
Scattered Ashes: A Decade of Emperial Wrath (2003)	Live Inferno (2009)	Emperor: The Complete Works (2016)

Live Inferno is the third live album by Norwegian black metal band Emperor. It was filmed during the band's sold-out 2005–2007 reunion performances. It was released in Europe on 20 April with several editions available. It is available as a 2CD slipcase with 16pg booklet, a limited edition Digibook featuring 2 CDs & DVD with an enhanced 24pg booklet, a single DVD, and two limited edition double vinyl gatefold sets.

The audio portion of the "Live Inferno" series features exclusive recordings from the band's headlining performances at Norway's Inferno festival and Germany's Wacken Open Air festival. The video portion, titled "Live at Wacken Open Air 2006 - A Night Of Emperial Wrath", has a running time of 70 minutes and includes footage professionally filmed at the Wacken Open Air festival with additional on-stage and exclusive backstage footage filmed and compiled by the band.

"It looks like these releases will be the final nail in the coffin for Emperor," says guitarist Samoth. "They are a testimony of the live reunion that took Emperor to even new heights; unique events like Wacken where Emperor headlined in front of 60,000 people. We had a great run of shows and feel lucky that we were able to come back even bigger and perform songs from our complete catalogue for a lot of dedicated fans old and new. There will be several cool formats and limited editions coming that should be a nice treat for the fans and a worthy representation of the Emperor legacy. Emperor is dead, long live the Emperor!"

== Disc 1 – Inferno Festival (CD) ==
1. Infinity Burning (medley)
2. Cosmic Keys to My Creations & Times
3. Thus Spake the Nightspirit
4. An Elegy of Icaros
5. Curse You All Men!
6. Wrath of the Tyrant
7. With Strength I Burn
8. Towards the Pantheon
9. The Majesty of the Nightsky
10. The Loss and Curse of Reverence
11. In the Wordless Chamber
12. Inno a Satana
13. I am the Black Wizards
14. Ye Entrancemperium
15. Opus a Satana

== Disc 2 – Wacken Open Air (CD) ==
1. Infinity Burning (medley)
2. Cosmic Keys to My Creations & Times
3. Thus Spake the Nightspirit
4. An Elegy of Icaros
5. Curse You All Men!
6. With Strength I Burn
7. Towards the Pantheon
8. The Majesty of the Nightsky
9. The Loss and Curse of Reverence
10. In the Wordless Chamber
11. I Am the Black Wizards
12. Inno a Satana

== Disc 3 – Wacken Open Air 'A Night of Emperial Wrath' (DVD) ==
1. Infinity Burning (medley)
2. Cosmic Keys to My Creations & Times
3. Thus Spake the Nightspirit
4. An Elegy of Icaros
5. Curse You All Men!
6. With Strength I Burn
7. Towards the Pantheon
8. The Majesty of the Nightsky
9. The Loss and Curse of Reverence
10. In the Wordless Chamber
11. I Am the Black Wizards
12. Inno a Satana
- Behind the Scenes
- Live Bootleg Videos

== Credits ==
- Ihsahn - Guitar and Vocals
- Samoth - Guitar
- Trym - Drums
- Secthdaemon - Bass and Backing Vocals session
- Einar - Keyboards and Backing Vocals session

== Production ==
- Produced By Thorbjorn Akkerhaugen & Emperor
- Both CD's mixed at Akkerhaugen Lydstudio & Symphonique Studios, 2008
- Christophe Szpajdel – logo
