= Fiction Reform =

American punk rock band

- Origin: Orange County, California, U.S.
- Genres: Punk rock
- Years active: 2009–2013
- Label: Basement Records
- Past members: Dan Powell, Tom Clark, Brenna Red, Aaron Chabak, Danny Baeza
- Website: FictionReform.com

Fiction Reform was an American punk rock band from Orange County, California, United States, formed in 2009. The band was signed to Basement Records based in La Habra, California who released their first album, Revelation in the Palms of the Weak, on April 20, 2010.

Fiction Reform formed when Dan Powell and Danny Baeza, who knew each other from playing in a band of the name Crooked Evangelists, recruited Aaron Chabak. The three of them created all the songs for Revolution In the Palms of the Weak, only without vocals. They recruited Brenna Red, who they had met previously while performing. She was recruited via a phone call after various other singers had auditioned.

Their song "Small Silhouette" was featured on ESPN's SportsCenter LA in October 2009 and was the first public exposure of the song. Fiction Reform songs have also been featured in Rob Dyrdek's Fantasy Factory and The Dudesons in America television shows.

Their second album Take Your Truth was released on November 13, 2012. Danielle Lehman joined the band at this time. In an interview with the magazine, [Innocent Words], Red said the album was recorded "with the intention of raising the bar. For local DIY bands, for punk music, for ourselves, we wanted to raise the bar.” The band stated that Take Your Truth was easier to record and had more harmony than the previous album since all the members were playing together during the recording. They went on to say that each song has potential to being released as a single because each one contributes a unique sound to the album. Fiction Reform currently has plans to tour the West Coast.

Influences for Fiction Reform include Bad Religion and Descendents. The band noted their influence could be heard particularly in "Who's to Blame" from Take Your Truth.

Fiction Reform was nominated for an OC Music award in 2011 for Best Punk.
