= Thunderdikk =

American hard rock band

Thunderdikk is a hard rock band from Los Angeles, California formed in 2007.

== Biography ==
Thunderdikk is fronted by lead singer, Dikk Thunder. According to Dikk, the band was formed "so people can let loose, dance and get crazy. When I called the other guys and told them the band was called Thunderdikk and the songs were about girls, partying and rock and roll, they jumped on it." The band claims Guns N' Roses and AC/DC as major influences.

In reviewing their 2008 debut EP, Rock Out With Your Dikk Out, Classic Rock Magazine called Thunderdikk "clearly the greatest rock band to emerge from LA since Van Halen," calling their "super sonic cock'n'roll equal parts Buckcherry and Ron Jeremy." Sleazegrinder (May 2009). "Round-Up: Sleaze". Classic Rock. 131: 79.

The band plays regularly in the greater Los Angeles area.

Thunderdikk refers to their fans as "Dikkheads."

== Media appearances ==
The band is perhaps best known for appearing on an episode of Oxygen Network's The Bad Girls Club. In Season 4, Episode 6, entitled "Paul and Kate Plus Hate," the Bad Girls attended a Thunderdikk concert at The Viper Room in West Hollywood, California. The appearance culminated with Bad Girl Lexie getting booed offstage after grabbing the microphone.

Guitar player Sleaze Paladino has been seen as a recurring character on G4's X-Play.

Thunderdikk's music has been heard on USA Network's Burn Notice, episode No. 413 "Eyes Open."

Thunderdikk's song, "My Name is Dikk," was used in an [adult swim] bump showcasing the song.

== Band members ==
- Dikk Thunder - vocals
- Sleaze "Bag" Paladino - lead guitar
- Johnny Razor - rhythm guitar
- Mickey Brunswick - bass guitar
- Snake "Skin" Paladino - drums.

== Rock Band Network ==
Thunderdikk's is part of Harmonix' Rock Band Network. In an interview with G4TV.com, the band estimated that it would take them over 70 hours to get their song "Bra Off Party On" programmed for Rock Band download. In May 2010, "Bra Off Party On" was made available for download on the Xbox 360 version of the Rock Band Network.

== Discography ==
=== Rock Out With Your Dikk Out (2008) ===
1. Nightfire
2. My Name Is Dikk
3. Ride My Lightning

=== Bra Off Party On (2009) ===
1. Bra Off Party On
2. Ocho (Eighth Wonder Of The World)
3. Hot Zombie Fuck

=== Magnum Love (2011) ===
1. Magnum Love
2. I Am The Thunderfukker
3. The Dikk Abides (If The Ladies Provide)
4. Bad Hands
5. Bra Off Party On
6. Love Fight
7. Sister Dolores
8. Nightfire
9. Route 69
10. Hot Zombie Fuck
11. Ride My Lightning
12. Ocho (Eighth Wonder Of The World)
13. "Albums". Thunderdikk.
