= Fauxharmonic Orchestra =

The Fauxharmonic Orchestra is an orchestra made up of digital orchestral instruments, some including the Vienna Symphonic Library conducted by Paul Henry Smith using a Wii Remote controller instead of a baton and a Wii balance board instead of a podium, both of which are programmed to modify the sounds in real time in response to the acoustics of the hall and the demands of the music.

One of the orchestra's first concerts was a public comparison with the Baltimore Chamber Orchestra in which both orchestras performed the same piece of music one after another so the audience could hear for itself how well digital orchestral instruments compare to their acoustic counterparts. On another occasion, recordings of Beethoven's Symphony No. 7 by such conductors as Roger Norrington and Fritz Reiner were mixed with Smith's recording with the Fauxharmonic and presented to music professors who incorrectly picked the live orchestras as being computer performances.

The orchestra was the first to perform a complete Beethoven symphony using only digital instruments in a live, public concert in Boston on May 20, 2009. The orchestra's concert series presenting the complete nine Beethoven symphonies is supported by Bang & Olufsen.
