= The Main Drag =

American indie pop and rock band

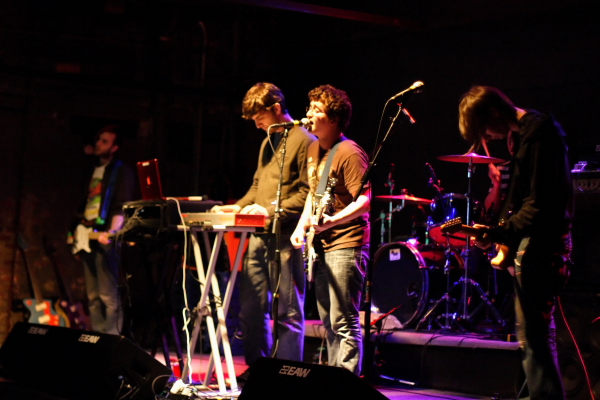
- The Main Drag performing live in 2007. Photo by Kris Ireland. Left to right: Jon Carter, Dan Cardinal, Adam Arrigo, Maxi Boch. Not pictured: John Drake.

Background information
- Origin: Boston, Massachusetts, U.S.
- Genres: Indie pop Indie rock
- Years active: 2003–2015 (on hiatus)
- Labels: Endless Recordings (2004); RPL Audio (2007-present)
- Members: Maxi Boch; Dan Cardinal; Jon Carter; John Drake
- Past members: Adam Arrigo; Matt Levitt

The Main Drag is an indie pop/indie rock band local to Boston, Massachusetts. The group incorporates elements as diverse as folk-pop to orchestrated electronica together with their occasionally oblique lyrics. The band releases albums on their own imprint, Reasonable People's League (RPL Audio).

The band currently consists of Maxi Boch (vocals, guitar, bass, keyboard, trumpet), Dan Cardinal (bass, engineering), Jon Carter (guitar, bass, vocals, keyboard) and John Drake (drums, sampler, vocals). Adam Arrigo and Matt Levitt, both original band members, eventually left the band - Levitt after the release of the second album, and Arrigo after the release of the third. Boch, Carter, and Drake are also members of the post-punk band Blanks. The band has released three albums to date, the latest being You Are Underwater, which was released by RPL Audio in December 2009.

== History ==
=== Formation and Simmer in Your Hotseat (2003–2006) ===
The Main Drag originally began as a collaboration between Arrigo and Levitt in early 2003. Arrigo has stated that the band name could be interpreted as a Death Cab for Cutie lyric, or it could simply be referring to the main drag of a town. With the help of local musicians and producers, Arrigo was able to begin recording and producing what would become the band's first album. Simmer in Your Hotseat was released in 2004 on Boston-based indie label Endless Recordings. The first album received a positive reception, and earned the band an opening gig for the Arcade Fire shortly after its release. Live shows were played with friends of Arrigo and Levitt who had helped record the album.

Arrigo went on to meet the members of post-punk band Blanks. through his friend Long Le-Khac, who was their bass player at the time. Arrigo and Le-Khac originally met in high school and were briefly part of a band called "The Neon Wilderness", which was named after the song "Neon Wilderness" by The Verve. Arrigo helped produce the Blanks. EP Infinite Lives in early 2006. After the release of the Blanks. EP, Dan Cardinal and three members of Blanks. - Maxi Boch, John Drake and Jon Carter - ended up joining Arrigo and Levitt, and they began working on The Main Drag's follow-up to Simmer In Your Hotseat.

=== Yours as Fast as Mine (2007–2008) ===
Prior to the release of Yours as Fast as Mine, the band put up several demos of songs on the website GarageBand.com, receiving positive acclaim and winning several "Track of the Day" awards and more.

The band went on to win Salon.com's National Song Search Contest in 2006 for their song "A Jagged Gorgeous Winter", gaining the $5,000 grand prize. This allowed them to finance their critically lauded album Yours As Fast As Mine which was released digitally in June 2007, and physical copies were self-released by the band shortly after. The album was issued through the band's own imprint, Reasonable People's League (RPL Audio). Levitt departed from being a full-time member of the band after the release of Yours As Fast As Mine.

In February 2007, before the release of their second album, the song "Goodnight Technologist" was included as part of Knocks From The Underground: The Best of Underplayed Boston, a compilation CD of indie bands local to Boston. In late 2007, the band was asked to create a cover of LCD Soundsystem's "All My Friends" for the Cokemachineglow Fantasy Covers Podcast 2007. The cover gained attention across various music blogs. The song "Love During Wartime" was included on Paste magazine's CD sampler in February 2008.

They garnered additional fame in late 2008 with the inclusion of their song "A Jagged Gorgeous Winter" in the on-disc track-list for Rock Band 2 as well as a nationally-aired Target commercial promoting the game. All members of the band (with the exception of Cardinal) work for Harmonix Music Systems, creators of the Rock Band series of video games, and the band's track made it onto the game due to Harmonix's tradition to release the company's songs as bonus tracks in their video games.

=== You Are Underwater and Rock Band Network (2009–present) ===
The Main Drag's third album, You Are Underwater, was released by RPL Audio in December 2009. The album, like previous releases, was self-recorded and self-released by the band. The album was first digitally pre-released in December 2009, and a CD release was held shortly after in January 2010. On the day of the You Are Underwater CD release, The Main Drag announced on their website that bandmate Adam Arrigo would be leaving the band in order to pursue other things. He played his final show with the band at the CD release for You Are Underwater. The CD release of the band's third album was held alongside the debut release of fellow RPL Audio band Spirit Kid.

"Love During Wartime" from Yours As Fast As Mine was featured on web series The Guild in early 2009 as the outro to the second season.

A music video for "A Jagged Gorgeous Winter (Rock Band 2 Mix)" was released in summer 2009. Directed by Isaac Ravishankara, the video consisted of a prominent homage to the comic strip Calvin and Hobbes, with Arrigo dressed as Calvin and Boch as Hobbes. The video was made to promote the band's remix of the song, which would go on to be included on You Are Underwater. The band has mentioned plans to make music videos for the tracks "Love During Wartime" and "Talk Them Down".

The band has announced that the entirety of both Yours As Fast As Mine and You Are Underwater will be launched on the Rock Band Network in early 2010, a system designed by Harmonix to allow artists to make their music available to purchase and play in the video game Rock Band. In order to help promote this, the band worked with French-Swiss directors Ben & Julia to create a surreal and psychedelic music video for the song "Dove Nets" (from Yours As Fast As Mine). The music video was accompanied by a website, Dove Lovers, which featured behind-the-scenes information and other bonus features.

In late 2009, the band began to release songs as remixable stems on the band's official website, allowing others to hear each individual track of the songs and create remixes using them. They plan to eventually have all of the songs from Yours As Fast As Mine and You Are Underwater available in this form.

A music video for the song "Cease and Desist" was released in March 2010. It was shot and directed by Nick Ahrens of Game Informer magazine. The video was filmed in Minnesota and features shots taken at a mutual friends home in Minneapolis and from a live performance by The Main Drag at Minneapolis' Fine Line during their Summer 2009 National Tour.

The band was recently in the studio working on another cover for Cokemachineglow, this time for their decade round-up: Cokemachine Glow Fantasy Covers: The 2000s. The cover is of Jason Derülo's song "Whatcha Say", Hot Chip's song "We're Looking for a Lot of Love", and Imogen Heap's song "Hide and Seek". The cover is titled "Whatcha Looking For? (Hide & Seek)" and was released in April 2010. In May 2010, the band was selected as the "Artist of the Month" by the T-Mobile Rock Band Network Connect promotion. Boch has recently mentioned in an interview that there are plans for RPL Audio to release a 7" split featuring The Main Drag and Spirit Kid. A fourth studio album is also currently in the works.

Currently, the band's official website, themaindrag.com, is inactive and appears to no longer be in possession of the band. It is unclear when the website was last affiliated with The Main Drag. In 2015, member John Drake made a Twitter post mentioning the band was on "permanent hiatus", due to members of the band moving out of the area.

== Discography ==
- Simmer in Your Hotseat (2004)
- Yours as Fast as Mine (2007)
- You Are Underwater (2009)
