= Kill No Albatross =

Canadian band

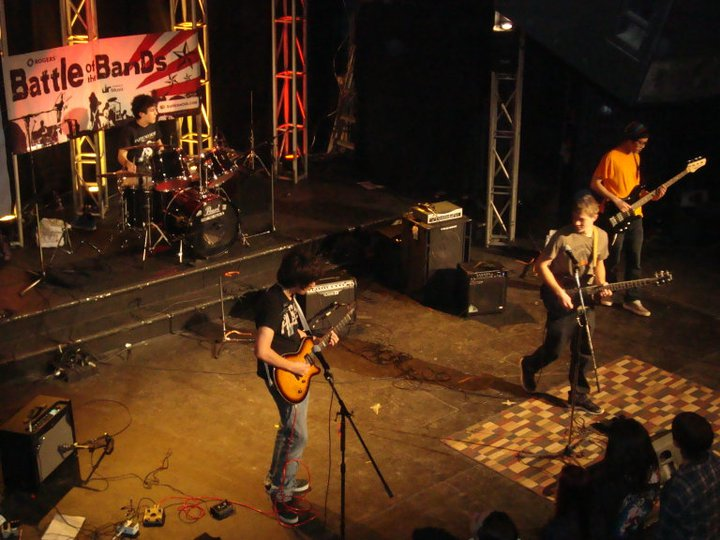
- Kill No Albatross live in Burlington, Ontario, Canada (26 February 2011).

Background information
- Also known as: Gatling
- Origin: Ontario, Canada
- Genres: Progressive rock, progressive metal, alternative rock, post-hardcore, ambient
- Years active: 2007–2019
- Members: Alex Crosty; Alexander Sallas; Josh Pinkney; Kyle Collins; Glenn Scott
- Past members: Elliot Slater; Matt Luu; Stéphan Guschewski; Tulio; Liam Kilawee

Kill No Albatross (formerly Gatling) was a Canadian band formed by Alexander Sallas and Alex Crosty in November 2007 in Burlington, Ontario. Their music is associated with progressive metal and alternative rock, though there are ambient, post-hardcore, and jazz influences as well. The band is noted for having two songs in the Rock Band video game series: "Nihilanth" and "Absolute," the former being one of the hardest guitar songs in the game with a section topping 25 notes per second. Their song "The Disguise" was featured regularly on CFRB's The Richard Syrett Show before the show was discontinued. Their debut full-length album, Beforemath, was released independently, despite record label interest, in April 2012.

== Discography ==
EPs

- 2009: Resonance Cascade [Demo]
- 2010: Hen In A Pumpkin
- 2011: Absolute EP
- 2013: Passiveclimactic
- 2017: Lost in Darkness and Distance
- 2018: Speak True Evil

Studio albums

- 2012: Beforemath
