= Eddie Hermida =

Venezuelan-American musician (born 1983)

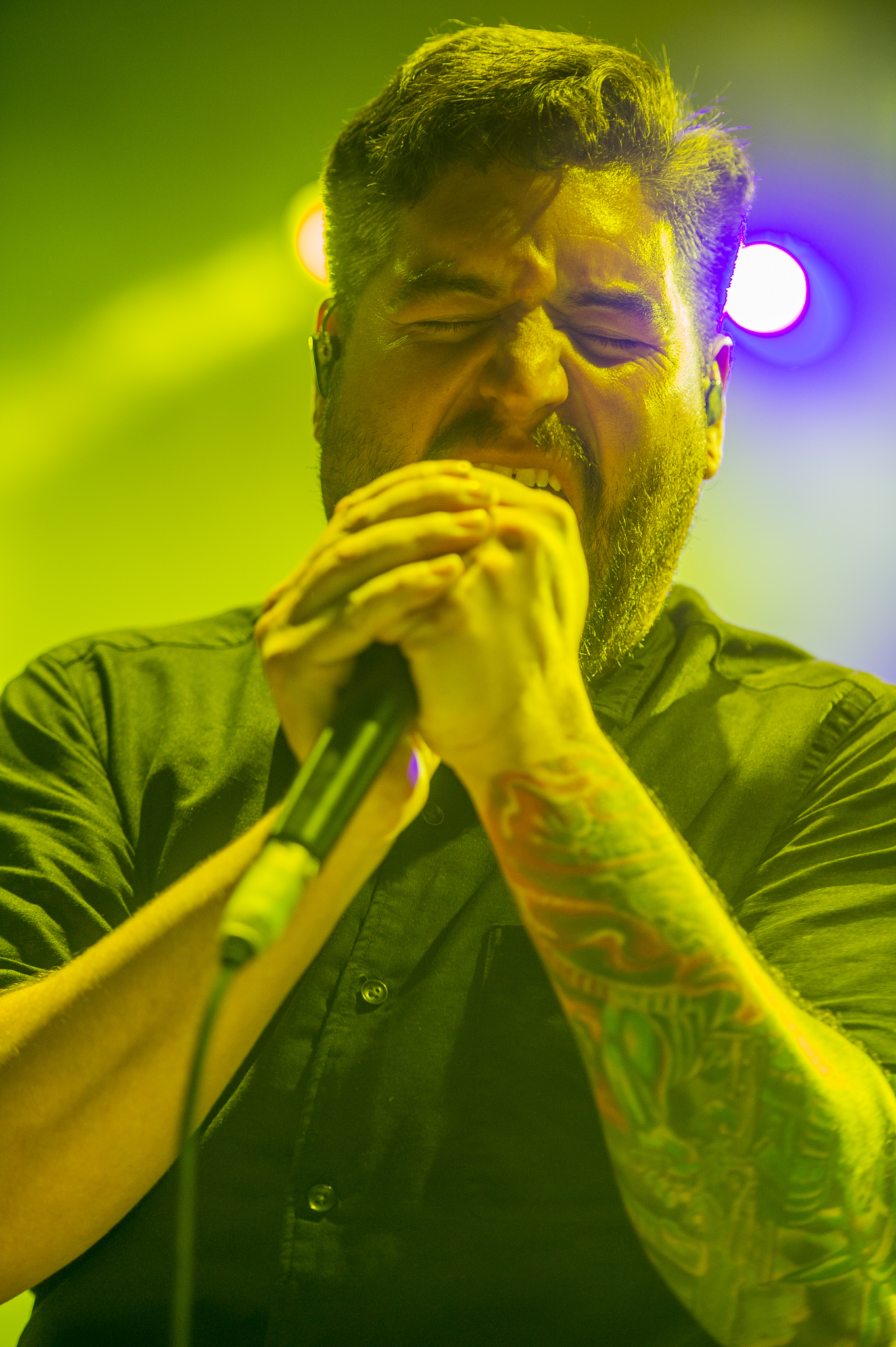
- Hermida in 2014

Background information
- Also known as: Eddie
- Born: Hernan Hermida Pacheco; March 24, 1983 (age 43); Cabimas, Zulia, Venezuela
- Origin: San Francisco, California, U.S.
- Genre: Deathcore
- Occupations: Singer; musician; songwriter
- Instrument: Vocals
- Years active: 2003–present
- Member of: Suicide Silence; All Shall Perish
- Formerly of: Gunmetal Grey

Hernan Hermida Pacheco (born March 24, 1983), also known as Eddie Hermida, is a Venezuelan-born American musician based in Riverside, California. He joined the deathcore band All Shall Perish in 2003, before leaving to perform vocals for Suicide Silence in 2013, eleven months after the death of their long-standing lead vocalist, Mitch Lucker.

== Early life ==
Hernán Pancheso Hermida was born on 23 March 1983 in Cabimas, Zulia, where he grew up with his two sisters until the age of 16. Eddie had been interested in heavy metal since the age of 14, influenced by albums such as Tomb of the Mutilated by Cannibal Corpse, Vulgar Display of Power by Pantera and Satisfaction Is the Death of Desire by Hatebreed. In 1999, Hernán moved with his family to San Francisco, California.

== Career ==
=== 2003–2012: Pre-Suicide Silence ===
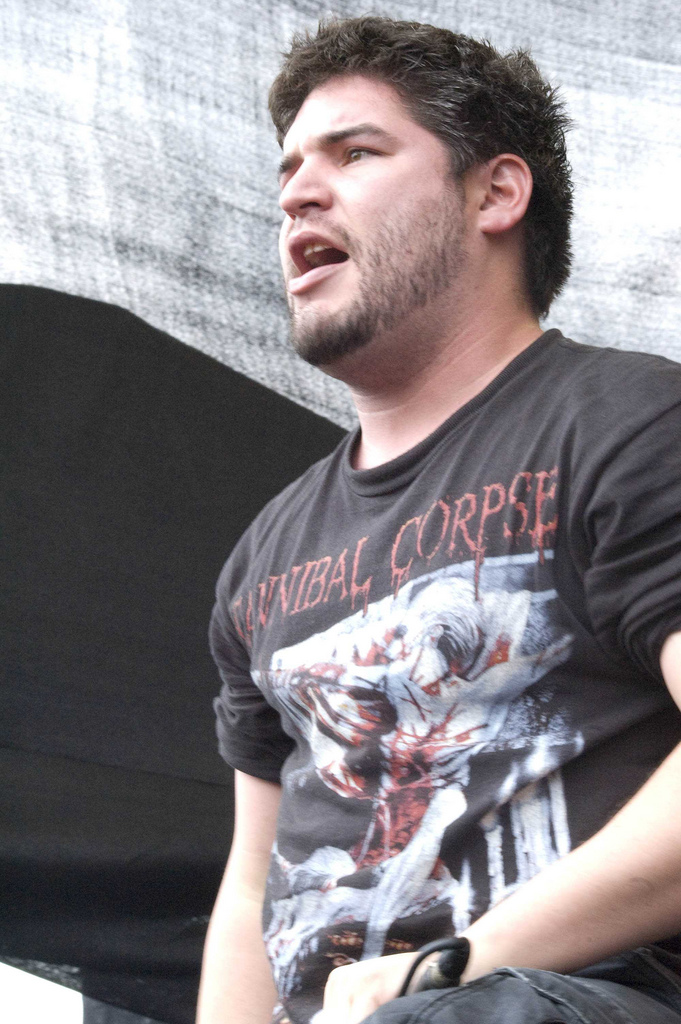
Hermida performing in 2008

In 2003, he formed his first band, Gunmetal Grey, which played a mix of thrashcore and metalcore. The band managed to record an EP, Solitude. This is the only recording on which Eddie sings with a clean vocal style. In 2006, following the breakup of Gunmetal Grey, Eddie was invited to join All Shall Perish, with whom he recorded the album The Price of Existence that same year. The albums Awaken the Dreamers and This Is Where It Ends were recorded in 2008 and 2011, respectively.

=== 2013–present: Suicide Silence ===
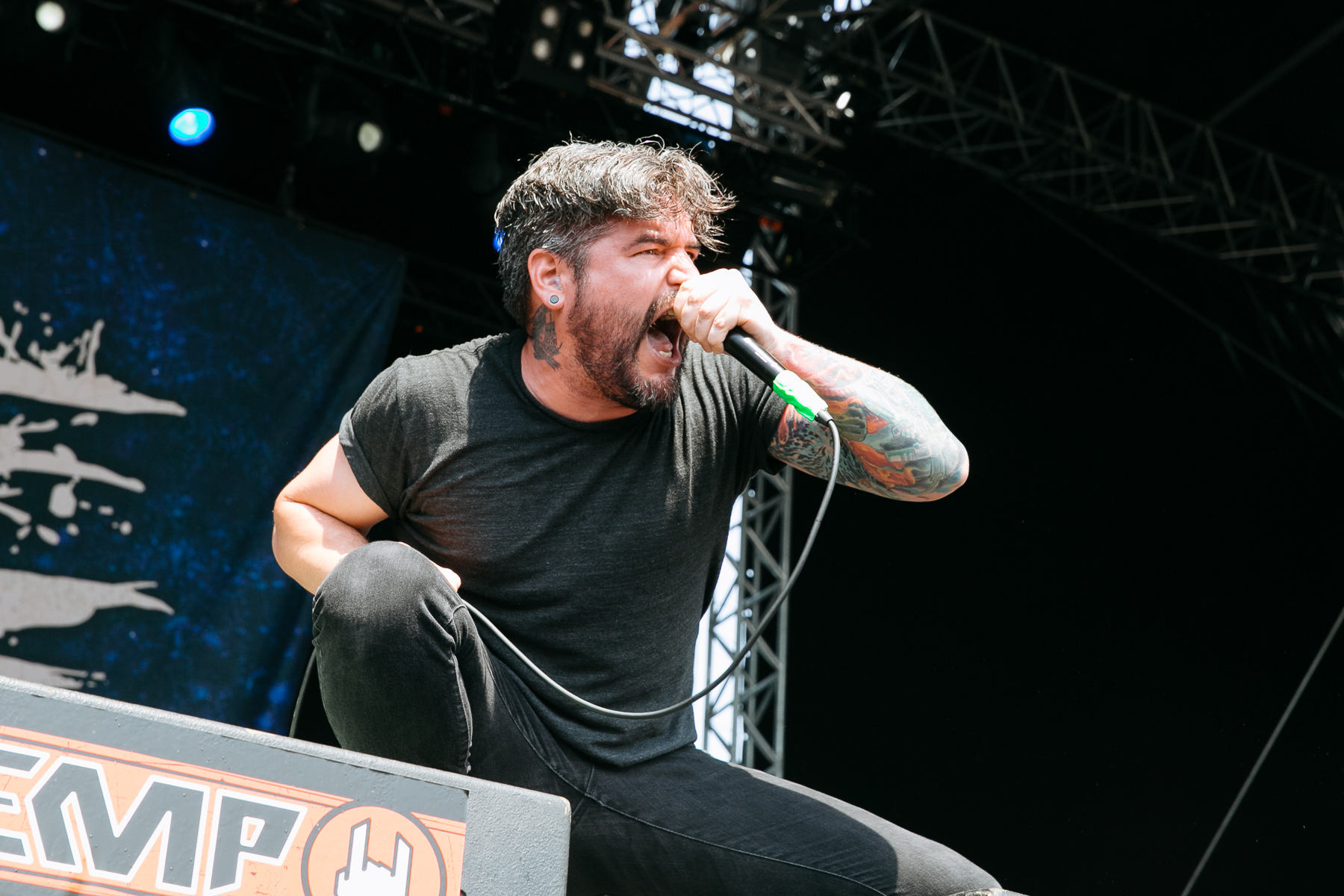
Hermida performing in 2015

Eddie also performed the song Slaves to Substance at a memorial concert in honor of Mitch Lucker of Suicide Silence. On October 5, 2013, Eddie left All Shall Perish to replace the late Mitch Lucker in Suicide Silence. On April 15, 2014, the title of Suicide Silence’s new album, You Can’t Stop Me, was announced; it was released on July 15. After touring worldwide in 2015, the band began recording their fifth album in 2016. It was also announced in 2015 that Eddie had returned to All Shall Perish.

== Controversy ==
Hermida, faced controversy for explicit sexual conversations with an underage Austrian fan. The allegations were made publicly by fan Verena Celis, who stated that Hermida had emotionally and sexually manipulated her while she was a minor. Hermida subsequently issued an apology and disputed a central part of Celis' account, stating that he believed she had told him she was 18 before their communications became sexual.

== Discography ==
- Genmetal Grey – Solitude (2005)
- All Shall Perish – The Price of Existence (2006)
- All Shall Perish – Awaken the Dreamers (2008)
- All Shall Perish – This Is Where It Ends (2011)
- Suicide Silence – You Can't Stop Me (2014)
- Suicide Silence – Suicide Silence (2017)
- Suicide Silence – Become the Hunter (2020)
- Suicide Silence – Remember... You Must Die (2023)
- Suicide Silence – Graceless (2026)
