= List of California State University, East Bay people =

People from California State University

== Alumni ==
- Brian A. Arnold, U.S. Air Force general.
- George Barlow, poet
- Ted Barrett, an umpire in Major League Baseball
- John Beam, former football coach and athletics director, Laney College
- Frank Beede, former Seattle Seahawks offensive lineman and 2010 NFL Teacher of the Year
- Mike Bellotti, college football analyst for ESPN television broadcasts
- Greg Blankenship, former American football linebacker who played one season in the NFL with the Oakland Raiders and the Pittsburgh Steelers
- Sue Burns, an American businesswoman who was the senior general partner (principal owner and largest shareholder) of the San Francisco Giants
- Alonzo Carter, American college football coach, head football coach of California State University, Sacramento.
- Ellen Corbett, a Democratic politician now living in Hayward
- Tom Coughlin, former vice chairman of Walmart
- Mark Curry, actor and comedian
- Natalie Del Conte, co-hosts the technology news podcast Buzz Out Loud
- George Fernandez, retired American soccer defender who played professionally in the Major Indoor Soccer League and National Professional Soccer League
- Ted Griggs, President of Comcast SportsNet Bay Area
- Elihu Harris, Chancellor of the Peralta Community College District, former Oakland City Mayor
- Sara M. Harvey, an American costume designer, and an author of clothing history and fiction
- J. R. Havlan, comedy writer on The Daily Show with Jon Stewart and recipient of six Emmy Awards for "Outstanding Writing for a Variety, Music or Comedy Program".
- Glenn Henry, computer industry executive and cofounder of Centaur Technology
- Eric Hughes, assistant coach, Toronto Raptors and former assistant coach of the Washington Huskies
- James Monroe Iglehart, Tony Award-winning actor
- Larry Johannessen, NIU English professor
- Jay Kleven, Major League Baseball catcher
- Suzy Kline, author of children's books series, Horrible Harry and Herbie Jones
- Scott Kriens, chairman and CEO of Juniper Networks
- Roger Lim, American-Asian actor, director, producer, and screenwriter
- Bill Lockyer, former State Attorney General, California State Treasurer
- Mark Mastrov, founder of 24 Hour Fitness, part-owner of the Sacramento Kings
- Howard McCalebb, African-American abstract sculptor
- Farzaneh Milani, Iranian-American scholar and author
- Joe Morgan, two-time Sports Emmy Award winner, former Cincinnati Reds great and Hall of Fame second baseman, analyst for ESPN's Sunday Night Baseball
- Kristen Morgin, sculptor
- Natali Morris, technology news journalist and online media personality
- Steven T. Murray, American translator from Swedish, German, Danish, and Norwegian. He has worked under the pseudonyms Reg Keeland and McKinley Burnett when edited into UK English
- Louis Navellier, Wall Street icon and trustee of the Cal State East Bay Education Foundation
- Susan B. Neuman, prominent educator, researcher, and education policy-maker in early childhood and literacy development
- Landon Curt Noll, American computer scientist
- Greg Petersen, an American soccer coach
- Mario R. Ramil, former Associate Justice of the Hawaii State Supreme Court
- Bruce Sagan, mathematics professor at Michigan State University and folk musician
- Christopher Seufert, filmmaker
- Phil Snow, assistant coach at Eastern Michigan University
- Phil Sykes, former college and professional ice hockey player
- Chester Lovelle Talton, provisional Bishop of the Episcopal Diocese of San Joaquin in the Episcopal Church
- Nicholas Vasallo, composer, founder of the post-metal group Antagony, film score career, and concert works lecturer for the CSUEB Music Department
- Alex Vesia, pitcher for the Los Angeles Dodgers
- Timothy P. White, chancellor of the University of California, Riverside
- Dawn Monique Williams, American theatre director
- Jennifer Wolch, dean of the College of Environmental Design at University of California, Berkeley
- Gene Luen Yang, comic book artist

== Faculty ==
- Clayton Bailey, professor emeritus of art
- Larry Bensky, radio show host, lecturer in the communications department
- Stephen D. Gutierrez, professor of English and director of creative writing
- Dave Eshelman, director of jazz studies
- Mel Ramos, professor emeritus of art, noted Pop Art painter
- Dakin Matthews, actor, emeritus professor of English
- Daryl W. Preston, professor of physics and astronomy
- John V. Robinson, 2006 Guggenheim Fellow, photographer, and author
- Theodore Roszak, professor emeritus of history and author of the seminal 1968 book, The Making of a Counter Culture
- Raymond Saunders, professor emeritus of art
- Allan Temko, architecture critic, teacher of city planning
- Kenneth R Rebman, professor emeritus of mathematics and dean of the college of science
- Russell Merris, professor emeritus of mathematics
