= Hail Mary (album) =

Studio album by Iwrestledabearonce
- Released: June 16, 2015
- Recorded: December 2014 – March 2015
- Genres: Mathcore; metalcore; deathcore
- Length: 44:45
- Labels: Artery, Tragic Hero, Antique
- Producer: Steven Bradley

Iwrestledabearonce chronology
Late for Nothing (2013)	Hail Mary (2015)

Singles from Hail Mary
- 1. "Gift of Death" Released: May 12, 2015

Professional ratings
Review scores
Source	Rating
About.com	3/5 stars
AllMusic	2.5/5 stars
Revolver	3/5

Hail Mary is the fourth and final studio album by American metalcore band Iwrestledabearonce. The album was released on June 16, 2015 through Artery Recordings, and was produced by guitarist Steven Bradley. It is the second and last album with vocalist Courtney LaPlante and the only album to feature guitarist Mike Stringer, who would later marry LaPlante and form Spiritbox.

== Background ==
The song "Erase It All" was released on April 6, 2015. The song features guest vocals by Eddie Hermida of Suicide Silence. A music video for album opener "Gift of Death" was released on May 12 via YouTube and Alternative Press. The song received positive reviews upon its release. The album's second music video, "Green Eyes", was released on June 9.

== Writing ==
Vocalist Courtney LaPlante stated she played a bigger role in the writing process for Hail Mary than she did for Late for Nothing. After feeling "a bit isolated" during the last album's writing process, LaPlante said she "was there for every single moment" on Hail Mary.

== Track listing ==
All tracks are written by Steven Bradley, Courtney LaPlante and Mike Stringer.

No.	Title	Length
1.	"Gift of Death"	2:51
2.	"Remain Calm"	3:06
3.	"Green Eyes"	3:36
4.	"Erase It All" (featuring Eddie Hermida)	3:30
5.	"Curse the Spot"	2:49
6.	"Doomed to Fail, Pt. 1"	4:13
7.	"Doomed to Fail, Pt. 2"	2:48
8.	"Killed to Death"	1:59
9.	"Trips"	3:01
10.	"Man of Virtue"	3:13
11.	"Carbon Copy"	3:09
12.	"Wade in the Water"	3:23
13.	"We All Float Down Here"	3:07
14.	"Your God Is Too Small"	4:00
Total length:		44:45

== Personnel ==
Iwrestledabearonce

- Courtney LaPlante – vocals
- Steven Bradley – guitar, programming
- Mike Stringer – guitar, programming
- Mike "Rickshaw" Martin – bass
- Mikey Montgomery – drums

Additional personnel

- Eddie Hermida – additional vocals on track 4
- Steven Bradley – recording, mixing, production
- Daniel McBride – artwork, layout, photography
