= Iwrestledabearonce =

American metalcore band (2007–2016)

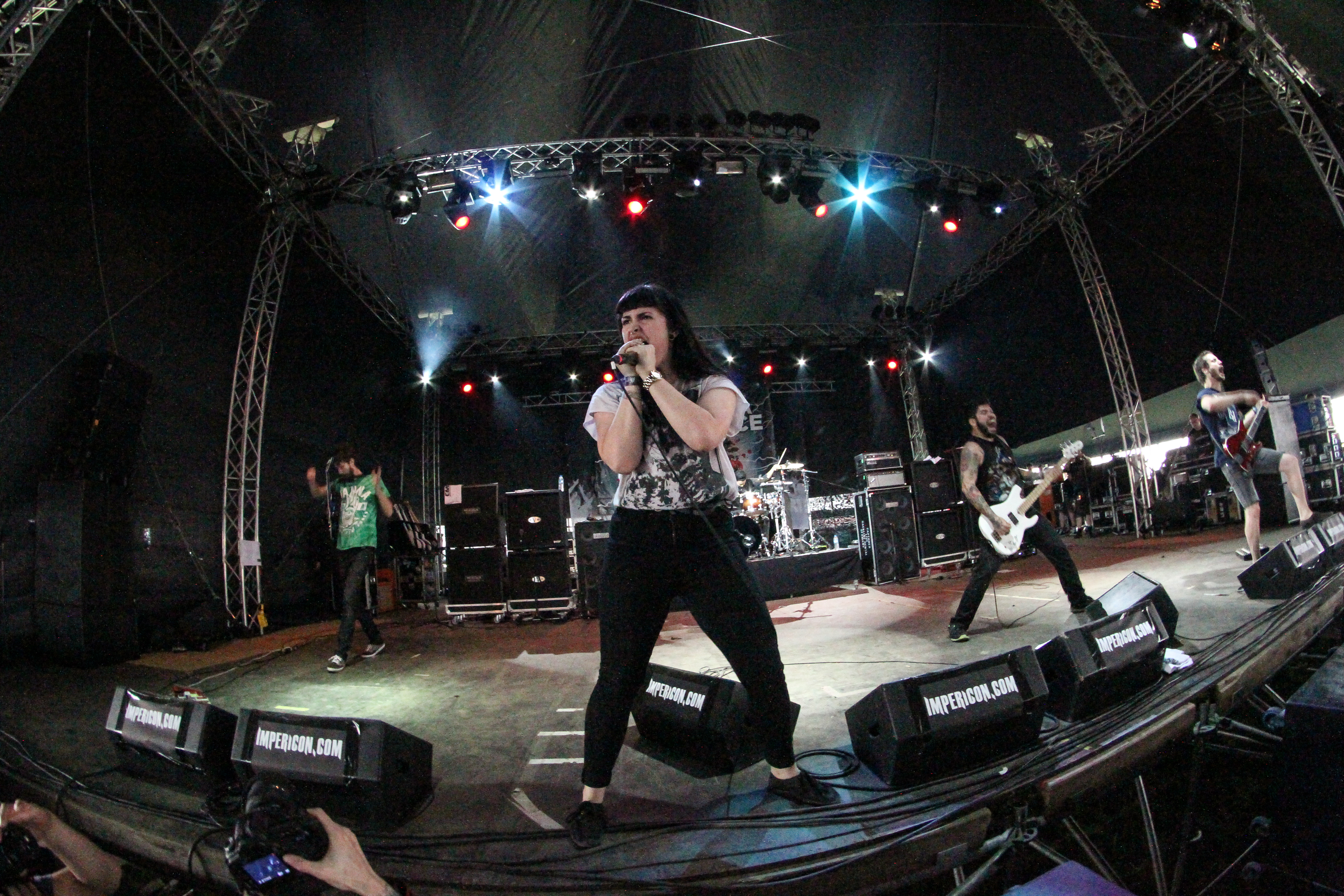
- Iwrestledabearonce performing in 2013

Background information
- Origin: Shreveport, Louisiana, U.S.
- Genres: Mathcore; metalcore; deathcore; avant-garde metal
- Years active: 2007–2016
- Labels: Tragic Hero; Eyeball; Century Media; Artery
- Spinoffs: Spiritbox
- Spinoff of: This Year's Addiction
- Past members: Steven Bradley; Krysta Cameron; Mike Martin; Mikey Montgomery; Brian Dozier; Nick Berchem; Ryan Pearson; Daniel Andrews; Melissa Cameron; Dave Branch; John Ganey; Mike Stringer; Courtney LaPlante
- Website: iwrestledabearonce.com

Iwrestledabearonce (often stylized in all lowercase; abbreviated as IWABO) was an American metalcore band formed in 2007 in Shreveport, Louisiana. In their nine years together, they released one EP, four full-length albums, and two remixed releases.

== History ==
=== Formation, EP and It's All Happening (2008–2010) ===
Prior to Iwrestledabearonce, guitarist Steven Bradley played in the Louisiana mathcore band Statues Cry Bleeding, the band was active around 2004 and broke up sometime in 2006. Bradley met Krysta Cameron at which point, decided to start rehearsing music with her and some other musicians in the area when he was impressed with her growl vocals. Iwrestledabearonce was officially formed during 2007 in Shreveport, Louisiana. The origin of this band's name was inspired by a comment made by Gary Busey on Comedy Central. They released their self-titled EP in 2007 through Bucket of Truth Recordings, and later re-released it with new cover art through Tragic Hero Records. The release gained the band a small cult following due to their highly experimental musical style. It also granted the band enough attention to acquire drummer, Ryan Pearson. Due to the band lacking a drummer during the EP's recording, all percussion was done in a drum machine program.

Iwrestledabearonce signed to Century Media by 2008 after their inclusion on tours supporting the EP which took them all the way North to Canada. The group then recorded and released their debut full-length album It's All Happening on June 2, 2009 in the United States and August 31, 2009 in European stores. In June through September 2008, their single, "Tastes Like Kevin Bacon" appeared on the Sirius Hard Attack radio station "Devils Dozen" list as high as No. 4 in the 12 most requested songs.

It's All Happening reached No. 1 on the Billboard Top Heatseekers chart and No. 122 on the Billboard 200 chart upon its release in 2009. Iwrestledabearonce then embarked on their second venture outside of the US in October 2009 in-support of It's All Happening. The "2009 Impericon Never Say Die" club tour which was sponsored by Impericon Clothing and Jägermeister in the UK and Europe with Architects, Despised Icon, As Blood Runs Black, Horse the Band, Oceano and The Ghost Inside. In December 2009 they were headliners in a US/Canada tour (The Tour That Stole Christmas) with Miss May I, Inhale Exhale and Of Machines. Iwrestledabearonce had been selected for the 2010 Van's Warped Tour and participated from July 20 until August 15, 2010. During the summer of 2009, the band decided to relocate to Birmingham, Alabama.

In 2010, the band re-released It's All Happening as a 3-disc special edition that includes the regular album, a remix album, and a DVD. Later, the group released a free 5-track remix EP titled It's All Dubstep.

=== Ruining It for Everybody and Cameron's departure (2011–2012) ===
With the recording of the band's new album, which was revealed to be titled Ruining It for Everybody, guitarist Steven Bradley stated that the group's new album will embrace black metal, along with the band incorporating the use of corpse paint. He expressed that the entire band agreed that they do not want to be pigeonholed as a band that is suffixed as "core" any longer and the new record will be "90% black metal". Bradley went on to say "We were sick of getting lumped in with 'scene' and 'whatever-core' bands, so we decided to embrace our roots and just go straight black metal on the new album. We had to change our image to match ...because of course that's just as important, if not more so, than the music." The black metal musical shift was later confirmed to be a large practical joke orchestrated by the band and the heavy metal website MetalSucks. The band's upcoming album, Ruining It for Everybody had a song from the album premiered on the website with the staff confirming that it was all a prank and that the upcoming album "features no actual black metal". The group primarily executed the joke to reveal and parody the over-serious attitude in black metal fans.

After the prank was revealed as false, Bradley later, in a serious note, commented on the album's style stating that it is "It's heavier, catchier, and better organized than anything we've done so far. We took a really spastic blend of genres and made it more cohesive."

During Warped Tour 2012, it was announced that original vocalist Krysta Cameron was pregnant and would have to leave the band for the rest of the tour. She was replaced by Courtney LaPlante, former vocalist of Unicron, for the remainder of the tour. However, bassist Mike "Ricky" Martin stated that same summer that Cameron would be permanently replaced by LaPlante after Cameron announced she would not be returning to the band due to wanting to spend more time with her family.

=== Late for Nothing (2013–2014) ===
As of January 24, 2013, the band had been writing music for their third studio album. On May 25, 2013, it was announced on their Facebook page that the band has finished recording the new album, following up with an update on June 7, 2013 that the album would be titled Late For Nothing, and would be released on August 6, 2013. On June 11, 2013, they released the first song off the album entitled "Thunder Chunky". On June 25, 2013, Century Media announced on their website that "Firebees" would be released as a single, along with an iTunes pre-order of the album. Late for Nothing was released on August 6, 2013, along with an accompanied music video for the song "Boat Paddle". Steve Vai is noted to have provided sections of the song "Carnage Asada" on guitar.

=== Hail Mary and split (2015–2016) ===
Their fourth album, Hail Mary, was released on June 16, 2015 via Artery Recordings. Due to the label being acquired by Warner Bros. Records on August 31, 2017, this would prove to be the band's one and only release via the label.

Following uncertainty of the band's status along with LaPlante's and Stringer's position in Iwrestledabearonce following the unveiling of their new project Spiritbox in October 2017, a fan asked LaPlante during an Instagram live video session if Iwrestledabearonce had broken up. LaPlante confirmed in the stream that she was no longer a member of Iwrestledabearonce; it was widely assumed at that time Stringer had also left the group, though LaPlante herself said she was unsure if the band had indeed broken up. In an interview with Loudwire in July 2019, she explained that she and her husband Mike Stringer's leaving was due to them being worn down by their status as "replacement people" (referring to how neither of them were original members), and their desire not to stagnate and to do something different. Although the departure was announced in October 2017, the two had made the decision to leave the band only months after the release of Hail Mary in 2015.

LaPlante and Stringer both currently perform in the band Spiritbox. Bradley works as a photographer, session musician and social media manager. Montgomery briefly performed with Spiritbox as a session drummer. Martin began his own YouTube channel, Worship & Tribute Nerd, which "examines comics, movies, TV, and pop culture."

=== Reunion talks (2024–present) ===
On December 10, 2024, bassist Mike Martin revealed on his podcast, Nerding out with Rickshaw, that an iwrestledabearonce reunion has been discussed between him and vocalist Krysta Cameron. Martin stated that more details will be revealed in the near future. On December 17, 2024, Cameron joined Martin's podcast, confirming that they are working on the reunion, but no new information was revealed.

== Musical style and influences ==
Although Iwrestledabearonce was generally categorized as mathcore, metalcore, experimental metal, and deathcore, the band's music is considered more diverse than the labels implied by themselves. This is due to their use of frequent genre changes within songs, varying between jazz, progressive metal, electro, synthpop, and even hillbilly music. The band has also been compared to grindcore.

The band attempted to evade categorization so significantly that they focused on blending as many genres as possible. Their song structures are known for chaotic changes in pace, varying between blastbeats, breakdowns and then contrasted rapidly by melodic, "lounged-out" interludes in the middle of their songs. Influences for their musical style have come from a wide variety of bands including The Dillinger Escape Plan, Radiohead, and Björk. Björk, particularly, was noted as being an inspiration for former vocalist Krysta Cameron's sung vocals.

== Band members ==
- Steven Bradley – guitar (2007–2016), programming, keyboards (2007, 2009–2016), drums (2007)
- Krysta Cameron – lead vocals (2007–2012)
- John Ganey – guitar, programming, keyboards (2007–2008, 2009–2013)
- Brian Dozier – bass (2007–2008)
- Daniel Andrews – keyboards, samples, programming (2007–2009)
- Ryan Pearson – drums (2007–2008)
- Mikey Montgomery – drums (2008–2016)
- Melissa Cameron – guitar (2008–2009)
- Dave Branch – bass (2008–2009)
- Mike "Rickshaw" Martin – bass (2009–2016)
- Courtney LaPlante – lead vocals (2012–2015)
- Mike Stringer – guitar, programming (2015)

== Discography ==
=== Studio albums ===
Year	Title	Label	Chart peaks				
Year	Title	Label	US	US Hard Rock	US Indie	US Rock	US Heat.
2009	It's All Happening	Century Media	122	16	—	47	1
2011	Ruining It for Everybody	Century Media	80	8	13	16	—
2013	Late for Nothing	Century Media	93	9	18	25	—
2015	Hail Mary	Artery	186	5	11	20	—

=== EPs ===
- Iwrestledabearonce (2007)

=== Remix albums ===
- It's All Remixed (2010)
- It's All Dubstep (2010)

=== Singles ===
Year	Song	Album
2007	"Ulrich Firelord: Breaker of Mountains"	Iwrestledabearonce EP
2008	"Tastes Like Kevin Bacon"	It's All Happening
2009	"You Ain't No Family"	It's All Happening
2011	"Karate Nipples"	Ruining It for Everybody
2011	"Next Visible Delicious"	Ruining It for Everybody
2011	"You Know That Ain't Them Dogs' Real Voices"	Ruining It for Everybody
2014	"Firebees"	Late for Nothing
2015	"Gift of Death"	Hail Mary

== Videography ==
Year	Song	Director
2007	"Ulrich Firelord: Breaker of Mountains"	
2008	"Tastes Like Kevin Bacon"	
2009	"You Ain't No Family"	David Anthony
2010	"See You in Shell"	
2010	"Danger in the Manger"	
2010	"The Cat's Pajamas"	
2011	"You Know That Ain't Them Dogs' Real Voices"	Scott Henson
2012	"I'm Gonna Shoot"	
2012	"Button It Up"	
2012	"Beary Scary Movie" DVD	Century Media
2013	"Boat Paddle"	
2015	"Gift of Death"	Shan Dan
2015	"Green Eyes"	Shan Dan
