= Eradication =

The word "eradication" is derived from Latin word "radix" which means "root". It may refer to:

- Eradication of infectious diseases, the reduction of the global incidence of an infectious disease in its host population to zero
- Extirpation, or intentional local extinction, of an introduced species
- Genocide, the deliberate, systematic destruction of an ethnic, religious or national group of people
- Intentional extermination of a population of insects or vermin as part of pest control
- A heraldic term denoting a tree that has been uprooted; see eradication (heraldry)
- Total removal of a given pathogen from an individual (medical or clinical use), also known as clearance of an infection, particularly in the context of HIV
- A song on the album The Price of Existence performed by the death metal band All Shall Perish

== See also ==
- Extirpation
