= Oblivion (metal band) =

American band

- Origin: Bay Area, California, USA
- Genres: Technical death metal
- Years active: 2007–present
- Label: Unique Leader Records
- Members: Nick Vasallo; Ben Orum; Ted O'Neill; Victor Dods; Luis Martinez
- Past members: Joe Ellis
- Website: obtainoblivion.com

Oblivion is an American technical death metal band from the Bay Area formed in 2007. They have released three albums, one demo and several music videos. Members of Oblivion have previously performed in several notable metal bands such as Antagony, All Shall Perish, Hacksaw to the Throat, Alchemicon, Feast and Fractals. Another notable aspect of Oblivion is the fact that one member has a doctorate degree in music and is a university professor, while another has a doctorate in mathematics. Currently, the band is signed to Unique Leader and will release multiple albums through the label. A reissue of their debut album, Called to Rise, was released on October 15, 2013.

== History ==
In 2007, after two decades away from the scene, Bay Area thrash metal veteran Ted O'Neill sought musicians with which to play music. His previous band, Alchemicon, had broken up after appearing on the Metal Blade Records compilation "Complete Death 2." O'Neill found a suitable partner in Joe Ellis, a seasoned session guitarist in the Bay Area metal scene. The duo began playing music together but required an additional component to refine their sound. They sought the services of Nick Vasallo, an award-winning composer and professor of music. Vasallo, who founded Antagony and fronted several other Bay Area bands, was appointed lead vocalist and bassist. The trio began writing songs immediately and recorded at their in-house recording studio (reamping courtesy of Zack Ohren at Castle Ultimate Studios in Oakland, California). Their first released song "Annunaki" went viral with a simultaneous video release that received over 5000 hits in 24 hours. Since their first studio session video they have received 20,000 views in 3 weeks. After their demo CD was released, both John Haag and Joe Ellis were replaced by Luis Martinez and Victor Dods.

== Ownership of band name and endorsements ==
Despite there being several other bands named Oblivion, the members officially secured the ownership of the name with the United States Patent and Trademark Office. Members of Oblivion are currently endorsed by KxK Guitars, Rhodes Amplification, Ibanez, Ernie Ball, Mesa Boogie, Fractal Audio, In Tune guitar picks, WeNeedMerch.com, VIPmerch.com and ENGL.

== Musical style, vocal style, and lyrical themes ==
Oblivion's music utilizes aspects from multiple styles of extreme metal: death metal, black metal, and thrash metal. Nick Vasallo's vocals frequently fluctuate between death growls, inward subtone singing and high-pitched screams.

Unlike much of their peers, Oblivion's lyrical themes do not revolve around religion, war, politics, or gore. Their band name literally translates to "the condition or state of being forgotten or unknown." Because of this they sing about the history of the earth that has been buried with time.

== Band members ==
Current members

- Ted O'Neil - guitar (2007–present)
- Nick Vasallo - vocals, bass (2007–present)
- Ben Orum - bass - (2012–present)
- Luis Martinez - drums (2012–present)
- Victor Dods - guitar (2012–present)

Former members

- Joe Ellis – guitar (2007-2012)

Live musicians

- John Haag - drums (2007–present)
- Curt Opem - drums (2007–present)

== Discography ==
Demos

Year	Album details
2012	DEMO 2012: Released: January 16, 2012; Label: self-released

Studio albums

Year	Album details
2013	Called to Rise: Released: January 1, 2013 (self-released); Reissued: October 15, 2013; Label: Unique Leader Records
2017	The Path Towards...: Released November 17, 2017
2019	Oblivion: Released January 21, 2019

== Music videos ==
Year	Title	Director
2012	"Studio Session No. 1: Annunaki" [HD]	Oblivion
2012	"Studio Session No. 2: Reclamation" [HD]	Oblivion
2012	"Studio Session No. 3: Between Suns of Light [HD]"	Oblivion
2012	"OBLIVION - Black Veils of Justice (Official Video) HD"	Chris Reese, Carlos Saldana, Grzegorz Jonkajtys
2012	"OBLIVION - Reclamation (Official Video) [HD]"	Brandon Hunt
2013	"OBLIVION - Canon 1 in E minor (Official Video) [HD]"	Brandon Hunt
2013	"OBLIVION - Multiverse (Official Video) [HD]"	Brandon Hunt
