= Gunmetal (disambiguation) =

Gunmetal is a kind of bronze.

Gunmetal, gunmetal gray or gunmetal grey may refer to:

- Gunmetal (color), a shade of gray

== Arts, media and entertainment ==
- Gunmetal (video game), a 1998 first person shooter game
- Gun Metal (video game), a 2002 3D shooting game
- Gunmetal Grey, a metalcore band from San Francisco, US
- Gun Metal Grey, a Hong Kong TV show
- Gunmetal Gray, a 2017 novel
