= It's All Happening (album) =

Studio album by Iwrestledabearonce
- Released: June 2, 2009
- Studio: The Molt House (Venice)
- Genres: Experimental metal; metalcore; mathcore; deathcore
- Length: 33:20
- Labels: Century Media, Eyeball, Daiki (Japan), Doom Patrol (Japan), Magnum (Taiwan)
- Producers: Iwrestledabearonce; Ryan Boesch

Iwrestledabearonce chronology
Iwrestledabearonce EP (2007)	It's All Happening (2009)	Ruining It for Everybody (2011)

Singles from It's All Happening
- 1. "Tastes Like Kevin Bacon" Released: May 14, 2008; 2. "You Ain't No Family" Released: June 10, 2009

It's All Happening is the debut full-length album by Iwrestledabearonce. It was released on June 2, 2009 through Century Media Records.

In 2021, Joe Smith-Engelhardt of Alternative Press included the album in his list of "30 deathcore albums from the 2000s that define the genre".

== Background ==
Iwrestledabearonce wrote and recorded It's All Happening within the course of 2008 through 2009 upon their signing to Century Media. Upon its release on June 2, 2009, it sold 4,300 copies in the United States in its first week of release to debut at position No. 121 on The Billboard 200 chart. The album landed at position No. 1 on the Top New Artist Albums (Heatseekers) chart.

On June 29, 2010, the band re-released It's All Happening as a 3-disc special edition that includes the regular album, a remix album entitled "It's All Remixed!", and a DVD. This special edition also includes song stems to allow fans to create their own remixes.

Several songs have titles related to various cartoons. For example, the song title "I'm Cold And There Are Wolves After Me" is a quote from The Simpsons episode "Cape Feare", the second episode from their fifth season.

== Reception ==
Professional ratings
Review scores
Source	Rating
About.com	1.5/5 stars
AllMusic	3.5/5 stars
AltSounds	77%
Chronicles of Chaos	8/10
laut.de	2/5 stars
Metal.de	4/10
MetalSucks	4/5 stars
PopMatters	7/10
Rock Hard	7/10
Rock Sound	7/10

The album generally received mixed to positive reviews. Ultimate Guitar commented by saying "Iwrestledabearonce are one of the strangest yet most unique bands out there today, and It's All Happening displays their style superbly. There are also random things thrown into songs, whether it's the famous 'Dixie' carhorn from The Dukes of Hazzard or the hillbilly sounding section in 'You Ain't No Family'. Besides their obvious random and strange sections, other sections display superior musicianship showing their ability to flawlessly change styles and switch sections." However, Phil Freeman of Allmusic commented on the album, stating "The band's grindcore parts are precise and mechanistic, but indistinguishable from those of 100 or more other bands; it's only when they leap into an electro-disco interlude, or start going jazz-prog for no reason, that one's attention is piqued, and even then it's not necessarily a good thing."

Both the first and fifth track, "You Ain't No Family" and "Tastes Like Kevin Bacon", were featured in the game Rock Band 2 as downloadable content via the Rock Band Network.

== Track listing ==
No.	Title	Length
1.	"You Ain't No Family"	3:46
2.	"White Water in the Morning"	3:51
3.	"Danger in the Manger"	2:20
4.	"I'm Cold and There Are Wolves After Me"	2:59
5.	"Tastes Like Kevin Bacon"	3:20
6.	"The Cat's Pajamas"	3:23
7.	"Pazuzu for the Win"	4:01
8.	"Black-Eyed Bush"	2:28
9.	"Eli Cash vs. the Godless Savages"	3:56
10.	"See You in Shell"	3:22
Total length:		33:20

Bonus tracks
No.	Title	Length
11.	"Danger in the Manger (Jimmy Urine Mix)"	3:48
Total length:		37:08

It's All Remixed!
No.	Title	Length
1.	"You Ain't No Family (DJ Danny Maverick Remix)"	4:20
2.	"White Water in the Morning (DJ Rampue Remix)"	3:43
3.	"Danger in the Manger (Jimmy Urine Remix)"	3:46
4.	"I'm Cold and There Are Wolves After Me (Rondo Remix)"	5:59
5.	"Tastes Like Kevin Bacon (The Benjamin Wemman Remix)"	3:19
6.	"The Cat's Pajamas (Invader's Remix by Latexxx Teens)"	3:33
7.	"Pazuzu for the Win (A7ie Remix)"	4:57
8.	"Eli Cash vs. The Godless Savages (9millionwaystodie aka Dada Yakuza Remix)"	5:36
9.	"See You in Shell (Alien Vampire Remix)"	5:28
Total length:		40:41

== Personnel ==
Iwrestledabearonce

- Krysta Cameron – vocals
- Steven Bradley – guitars, keyboards, samples
- John Ganey – guitars, keyboards, samples
- Dave Branch – bass
- Mikey Montgomery – drums, backing vocals

Production

- Programming by John Ganey and Steven Bradley
- Artwork by Sons of Nero

== Charts ==
Chart	Peak position
U.S. Billboard 200	122
U.S. Billboard Top Heatseekers	1
