= Ruining It for Everybody =

Studio album by Iwrestledabearonce
- Released: July 26, 2011
- Genres: Experimental metal; metalcore; mathcore
- Length: 31:46
- Labels: Century Media, Triple Visión (Japan)
- Producers: Steven Bradley, Ryan Boesch

Iwrestledabearonce chronology
It's All Happening (2009)	Ruining It for Everybody (2011)	Late for Nothing (2013)

Singles from Ruining It for Everybody
- 1. "Karate Nipples" Released: June 21, 2011; 2. "Next Visible Delicious" Released: June 23, 2011; 3. "You Know That Ain’t Them Dogs' Real Voices" Released: July 5, 2011

Professional ratings
Aggregate scores
Source	Rating
Metacritic	74/100
Review scores
Source	Rating
Allmusic	3.5/5 stars
Alternative Press	3/5 stars
CraveOnline	9.5/10
Kerrang!	4/5 stars
Rock Sound	8/10 stars

Ruining It for Everybody is the second album by Iwrestledabearonce. It was released on July 26, 2011 through Century Media Records and is the first studio full-length since 2009's It's All Happening. This is the last album with original vocalist Krysta Cameron who departed the band in late 2012. Before preparing for their second record, the band released several remix editions of their songs featured on their debut; most notably, the 2010 remix EP It's All Dubstep.

== Style and lyrical themes ==
Guitarist Steven Bradley states that "It's heavier, catchier, and better organized than anything we've done so far. We took a really spastic blend of genres and made it more cohesive." Beforehand, Bradley hosted a prank when he spoke to MetalSucks about the album being "90% black metal", this news was coupled with photos of the band in corpse paint and dark clothing; the controversial gag was revealed as nothing more than a joke days later.

Ruining It for Everybody features a more broad and open selection of lyrical themes than their previous releases. On "Next Visible Delicious", the band makes warnings about the dangers of not thinking for oneself. "People believe anything fed to them if they are told by someone with power that it's truth. Your head will spin trying to rationalize religion, politics, and environment. The song references mother nature becoming fed up with our ways and swallowing us whole. It's a warning of our long-awaited Armageddon. No, not the movie…"

"Button It Up" refers to the kidnapping and soon death of young girls as vocalist Krysta Cameron says "It's a dark song, It tells the tale of a girl who has her life taken from her. I'd read about young girls exploiting their bodies on the Internet and lying about their ages. The next thing you know, they go missing, are raped, and found dead. It's terrifying."

== Track listing ==
No.	Title	Length
1.	"Next Visible Delicious"	2:40
2.	"You Know That Ain’t Them Dogs' Real Voices"	2:58
3.	"Deodorant Can’t Fix Ugly"	3:17
4.	"This Head Music Makes My Eyes Rain"	3:24
5.	"It Is “Bro” Isn’t It?"	2:39
6.	"Gold Jacket, Green Jacket"	2:24
7.	"Break It Down Camacho"	2:53
8.	"Stay to the Right"	2:29
9.	"I’m Gonna Shoot"	2:37
10.	"Karate Nipples"	3:06
11.	"Button It Up"	3:19
Total length:		31:46

Japanese bonus tracks
No.	Title	Length
12.	"Danger in the Manger" (Big Chocolate Remix)	3:44
13.	"See You in Shell" (Sluggo Remix)	4:13

== Charts ==
Charts	Peak position
U.S. Billboard 200	80
U.S. Billboard Rock Albums	16
U.S. Billboard Independent Albums	13
U.S. Billboard Hard Rock Albums	8

== Personnel ==
Iwrestledabearonce

- Krysta Cameron – vocals
- Steven Bradley – guitar, programming
- John Ganey – guitar, programming
- Mike “Rickshaw” Martin – bass guitar
- Mikey Montgomery – drums

Production

- Produced, engineered, and mixed by Steven Bradley and Ryan Boesch
- Additional editing by Nicole Oliva
- Mastered by Alan Douches for West West Side
