= Rusty Cooley =

American guitarist (born 1970)

- Born: April 27, 1970 (age 56); Houston, Texas, U.S.
- Genres: Instrumental rock; heavy metal; progressive metal; power metal
- Instrument: Guitar
- Years active: 1985–present
- Website: rustycooley.com

Rusty Cooley (born April 27, 1970) is an American guitarist and guitar teacher. He is known for his shredding.

== Career ==
=== Beginnings ===
Cooley received his first guitar, a Peavey T27, and amplifier, a Peavey Decade, for his fifteenth birthday. He initially took guitar lessons but later became dissatisfied with local instructors and opted to teach himself. To develop his skills, he utilized various instructional resources, including Doug Marks's Metal Method, Ted Greene's Chord Chemistry and Modern Chord Progressions, REH instructional videos, and Robben Ford's instructional DVDs.

His early musical influences were guitarists Randy Rhoads, Yngwie Malmsteen, Steve Vai, Paul Gilbert, Vinnie Moore and Tony MacAlpine. After only three years of playing the guitar, he became a guitar teacher at the music store where he had purchased his first guitar. Having finished high school, Cooley went to the local college and studied music theory.

=== Solo career ===
Cooley became dissatisfied with working with local musicians. He began to create solo music in early 1996. Around this time, he switched to using only seven-string guitars.

His debut solo album was the self-titled Rusty Cooley, released in 2003 by Lion Music. It consisted of 12 tracks, one of which, "Under the Influence", was released alongside a music video. The album featured Cooley on guitar, Brent Marches on bass, Eric Sands on fretless bass, and Bobby Williamson on keyboard. Music was by Cooley, Marches, and Kelly Carpenter; Carpenter also wrote the lyrics for, and handled the vocals on, the vocal versions of "Dominion" and "The Machine". Programming was done by Cooley and Williamson, while guitar engineering was done by Sands. Cooley also was in charge of the production.

=== Recent work ===
Cooley is currently in collaboration with ProTone Pedals, testing their new Jason Becker Perpetual Burn signature distortion pedals. Becker himself could not test as he has been suffering from ALS since 1990 and is no longer able to play guitar. ProTone has recently been working on a Rusty Cooley signature pedal. Cooley has collaborated with Dean Guitars to produce a signature seven-string model, of which several versions exist.

Cooley is currently working with a new band, Day of Reckoning.

=== Teaching ===
Cooley has been a guitar instructor since he was 18, his third year of playing. He has released five instructional products, done lessons for magazines (such as his "Metal Guru" column) and posted many lessons on sites such as Shredaholic. He has taught for the National Guitar Workshop three times (1996, 1997, 1998) and given many clinics. Cooley has many well-known students, such as Chris Storey/Cris Osuna (ex-All Shall Perish) and Mica Roth, a former member of Hybreed.

Between 2011 and 2013, he hosted a video on the YouTube channel 'GuitarAsylumTV', in which he interviewed rock and metal guitarists. Some of the musicians he has interviewed include Oli Herbert, Mark Tremonti, and Jeff Loomis.

== Endorsements ==
Cooley currently endorses Ormsby Guitars, EMG Pickups, Morley Pedals, GHS strings, VHT, Rocktron, Eventide, Maxon and more recently Randall Amplification.

He previously endorsed Jackson Guitars, Ibanez Guitars and Dean Guitars.

His signature Dean model was released at NAMM in early 2007.

Cooley appeared on the podcast, Cyber Timebite, in April 2019.

== Releases ==
=== Music ===
- Rusty Cooley - Rusty Cooley (2003, Lion Music)
- Book of Reflections - Book of Reflections (2004, MCD, Lion Music)
- Outworld - Outworld (2006, Replica Records)
- Outworld - "Promo 2008" (2008, self-released)
- All Shall Perish - Awaken the Dreamers (2008, Nuclear Blast, guest)
- Austrian Death Machine - Double Brutal (2009, Metal Blade Records, guest)
- Derek Sherinian - Molecular Heinosity (2009, InsideOut Music, guest)
- The Sean Baker Orchestra - Baker's Dozen (2009, Lion Music, guest)
- After the Burial - In Dreams (2010, Sumerian Records, guest)
- Michael Angelo Batio - Intermezzo (2013, M.A.C.E., guest)
- Rings of Saturn - Infused (2014, Unique Leader Records, guest)
- Screamking - The Indomitable Spirit / Caligula (2021, Platinum Dungeon LLC) Guest Appearance.

=== Instructional products ===
- Shred Guitar Manifesto (2000, DVD, Chops From Hell)
- Extreme Pentatonics (2001, DVD, Chops From Hell)
- The Art of Picking (2001, DVD, Chops From Hell)
- Rusty Cooley Performance/Clinic (2003, DVD, Chops From Hell)
- Rusty Cooley Performance/Clinic 2 (2003, DVD, Chops From Hell)
- Basic Training (2007, DVD, Chops From Hell)
- Rusty Cooley Fret Board Autopsy - Scales, Modes & Patterns Level 1 (DVD, 2008, Rock House Method)
- Rusty Cooley, Fret Board Autopsy - Scales, Modes & Patterns Level 2 (DVD, 2008, Rock House Method)
- Arpeggio Madness: Insane Concepts & Total Mastery (DVD, 2011, Rock House Method)

=== Television appearances ===
- Stay Tuned
- Metallurgy Live
- Metallurgy Unplugged
- World Class Guitar Techniques
- Robb's Metal Works
- Rusty Cooley's Guitar Asylum TV
