= Hate, Malice, Revenge =

Studio album by All Shall Perish
- Released: August 19, 2003
- Recorded: May, 2003 – June, 2003
- Studio: Castle Ultimate Studios, Oakland, California
- Genre: Deathcore; technical death metal
- Length: 36:08
- Label: Amputated Vein; Nuclear Blast
- Producer: All Shall Perish; Zack Ohren

All Shall Perish chronology
Hate, Malice, Revenge (2003)	The Price of Existence (2006)

Singles from Hate, Malice, Revenge
- 1. "Deconstruction" Released: May 15, 2006

Professional ratings
Review scores
Source	Rating
AllMusic	3/5 stars
Blabbermouth.net	(7/10)
Lambgoat	7/10 stars

Hate, Malice, Revenge is the debut studio album by American deathcore band All Shall Perish. Originally, the album was distributed by the small Japanese label Amputated Vein in 2003, and was then re-released by Nuclear Blast in 2005.

== Track listing ==
All music and lyrics by All Shall Perish

No.	Title	Length
1.	"Deconstruction"	2:52
2.	"Laid to Rest"	4:41
3.	"Our Own Grave"	4:09
4.	"The Spreading Disease"	4:32
5.	"Sever the Memory"	5:12
6.	"For Far Too Long..."	4:03
7.	"Never Ending War"	6:25
8.	"Herding the Brainwashed"	4:14
Total length:		36:08

== Personnel ==
- Craig Betit – vocals
- Caysen Russo – guitar, vocals
- Ben Orum – guitar
- Mike Tiner – bass guitar
- Matt Kuykendall – drums

Production

- All Shall Perish – producer
- Zack Ohren – producer, engineer, mastering, mixing
