= This Is Where It Ends =

Studio album by All Shall Perish
- Released: July 26, 2011
- Studio: Castle Ultimate Studios in Oakland, California
- Genre: Deathcore; metalcore; melodic death metal
- Length: 53:19
- Label: Nuclear Blast
- Producer: Zack Ohren

All Shall Perish chronology
Awaken the Dreamers (2008)	This Is Where It Ends (2011)

Professional ratings
Review scores
Source	Rating
AllMusic	3/5 stars
The Metal Critic	8/10 stars
Real Metal Reviews	10/10 stars

This Is Where It Ends is the fourth studio album by American deathcore band All Shall Perish. It was released on July 26, 2011, through Nuclear Blast. The majority of the follow-up to the previous record, Awaken the Dreamers, was recorded and mixed once again at Castle Ultimate Studios in Oakland with producer Zack Ohren. It is the final album to feature bassist Mike Tiner, guitarist Francesco Artusato, and drummer Adam Pierce.

The songs "There Is Nothing Left", "A Pure Evil", "Embrace the Curse", "Spineless", "My Retaliation", "Rebirth", "The Death Plague", and "In This Life of Pain" are all featured and available as downloadable content in Rock Band 3 via the Rock Band Network

== Track listing ==
All lyrics are written by Eddie Hermida; all music is composed by All Shall Perish.

No.	Title	Length
1.	"Divine Illusion"	3:21
2.	"There Is Nothing Left"	3:22
3.	"Procession of Ashes"	4:36
4.	"A Pure Evil"	5:12
5.	"Embrace the Curse"	2:56
6.	"Spineless"	3:57
7.	"The Past Will Haunt Us Both"	6:04
8.	"Royalty into Exile"	4:24
9.	"My Retaliation"	3:23
10.	"Rebirth"	5:29
11.	"The Death Plague" (featuring Alexandre Erian of Despised Icon)	3:02
12.	"In This Life of Pain"	7:33
Total length:		53:19

Bonus tracks
No.	Title	Length
13.	"Nobleza En Exilio" (Spanish version of "Royalty into Exile")	4:23
14.	"Surprise! You're Dead!" (Faith No More cover, iTunes bonus track)	2:22
Total length:		60:04

== Charts ==
Charts	Peak position
Canadian Albums Chart	96
U.S. Billboard 200	50
U.S. Billboard Rock Albums	10
U.S. Billboard Independent Albums	8
U.S. Billboard Hard Rock Albums	5
U.S. Billboard Tastemaker Albums	24

== Personnel ==
All Shall Perish

- Hernan "Eddie" Hermida – vocals
- Francesco Artusato – lead guitar, piano on "In This Life of Pain"
- Ben Orum – rhythm guitar
- Mike Tiner – bass
- Adam Pierce – drums

Production

- Zach Ohren – production
- Brent Elliot – artwork
