= Gunmetal Grey =

American thrashcore band

- Origin: San Francisco, California, U.S.
- Genres: Metalcore; Thrashcore
- Years active: 2002–2006
- Labels: Indianola Records; Currently Unsigned
- Members: Stephen Lauck; Thomas; Tashia Govan; Tim Burge
- Past members: Hernan "Eddie" Hermida; Stephen Lauck; Brandon Scot; Andrew Lawrence Smith; Brandon Scott Thomas
- Website: http://www.myspace.com/gunmetalgrey

Gunmetal Grey was an American thrashcore band that was formed in 2002 as a side project of some San Francisco Bay area hardcore veterans. It was formed by Stephen Lauck (of Hoods) and drummer Brandon Thomas (of S.E.E.D.). They currently have one album out, titled Solitude. Gunmetal Grey's sound was inspired by bands such as Metallica and At the Gates.

== Biography ==
In 2003, the only members at the time were Stephen Lauck and Brandon Thomas. This eventually led to the recruitment of both vocalist Eddie Hermida and lead guitarist Brandon Scot into the band. At that point Gunmetal Grey sought fit to continue the production of their first album titled 'Solitude' only after bassist Andrew Smith was added to the band. 'Solitude' received mixed reviews from critics, but reviews from Russ Hockenbury, Aversion Online, and one from Loudside, all thought the guitar work was quite intricate and written to perfection. As of 2006, Hernan "Eddie" Hermida departed from Gunmetal Grey to become the lead vocalist for Deathcore band All Shall Perish.

== Members ==
Members on the album:

- Hernan "Eddie" Hermida (vocals)
- Stephen Lauck (guitar)
- Brandon Scot (guitar)
- Andrew Lawrence Smith (bass)
- Brandon Scott Thomas (drums)
