= Awaken the Dreamers =

Studio album by All Shall Perish
- Released: September 16, 2008
- Recorded: 2008
- Studio: Castle Ultimate Studios in Oakland, California
- Genres: Deathcore, metalcore
- Length: 35:49
- Label: Nuclear Blast
- Producer: Zack Ohren

All Shall Perish chronology
The Price of Existence (2006)	Awaken the Dreamers (2008)	This Is Where It Ends (2011)

Professional ratings
Review scores
Source	Rating
About.com	4/5 stars
AllMusic	3/5 stars
Lambgoat	7/10 stars
Loudside	11/11 stars

Awaken the Dreamers is the third studio album by American deathcore band All Shall Perish. It was released on September 16, 2008 through Nuclear Blast. It sold just under 5,000 copies in its first week of release entering the Billboard 200 at number 126. The album is notable for including clean vocals in tracks such as the title track and "Memories of a Glass Sanctuary", something that is rare in deathcore.

The tracks "When Life Meant More...", "Never... Again", "Awaken the Dreamers", and "Stabbing to Purge Dissimulation" have been added to the band's official MySpace page. Rusty Cooley plays two guitar solos on the track "From So Far Away" and Cam Pipes performs guest vocals on "Black Gold Reign". The closing track, "Songs for the Damned", includes lyrics that reference famous heavy metal albums and songs by Opeth (My Arms, Your Hearse, Blackwater Park, Damnation), Slayer (Reign in Blood), Carcass (Swansong, Necroticism – Descanting the Insalubrious, Heartwork), Cannibal Corpse ("Stripped, Raped and Strangled"), Deicide (Once upon the Cross), Dying Fetus (Destroy the Opposition), The Dillinger Escape Plan ("Sugar Coated Sour"), Iron Maiden ("2 Minutes to Midnight"), and Danzig (as well as the song "20 Eyes" by Danzig's early band, the Misfits).

Metallica guitarist Kirk Hammett listed the album as one of his top 25 favorite albums from 2000 to 2009.

== Track listing ==
No.	Title	Length
1.	"When Life Meant More..."	3:01
2.	"Black Gold Reign"	4:37
3.	"Never... Again"	3:12
4.	"The Ones We Left Behind"	1:07
5.	"Awaken the Dreamers"	4:37
6.	"Memories of a Glass Sanctuary"	2:43
7.	"Stabbing to Purge Dissimulation"	2:36
8.	"Gagged, Bound, Shelved and Forgotten"	3:43
9.	"Until the End"	2:56
10.	"From So Far Away"	2:38
11.	"Misery's Introduction"	1:01
12.	"Songs for the Damned"	3:38
Total length:		35:49

Tracks 9 and 10 are switched on the back of the album.

== DVD ==
The limited-edition version of the album also comes with a bonus DVD entitled Stories from the Road. It runs for 34:25 and features footage of the band on tour, some live footage and a documentary of the making of "Awaken the Dreamers".

== Personnel ==
- Ben Orum – guitar
- Mike Tiner – bass
- Hernan "Eddie" Hermida – vocals
- Chris Storey – guitar
- Matt Kuykendall – drums

Guest musicians

- Rusty Cooley – guitar solos on "From So Far Away"
- Cam Pipes – guest vocals on "Black Gold Reign"
