= Late for Nothing =

Studio album by Iwrestledabearonce
- Released: August 6, 2013
- Genres: Metalcore, experimental metal
- Length: 37:52
- Label: Century Media
- Producer: Steven Bradley

Iwrestledabearonce chronology
| Ruining It for Everybody (2011) | Late for Nothing (2013) | Hail Mary (2015) |

Singles from Late for Nothing
- 1. "Firebees" Released: June 25, 2013

Professional ratings
Aggregate scores
| Source | Rating |
|---|---|
| Metacritic | 68/100 |
Review scores
| Source | Rating |
| Allmusic | 4/5 stars |
| Kerrang! | 3/5 stars |
| MetalSucks | 3.5/5 stars |
| PopMatters | 6/10 |
| Revolver | 3.5/5 stars |
| Ultimate Guitar | 7/10 |

Late for Nothing is the third studio album by the American metalcore band Iwrestledabearonce, released through Century Media on August 6, 2013. It is the band's first release with vocalist Courtney LaPlante.

== Track listing ==
| No. | Title | Length |
|---|---|---|
| 1. | "Thunder Chunky" | 3:24 |
| 2. | "Letters to Stallone" | 3:37 |
| 3. | "Snake Charmer" | 2:43 |
| 4. | "Boat Paddle" | 3:25 |
| 5. | "Firebees" | 2:56 |
| 6. | "Mind the Gap" | 3:48 |
| 7. | "Carnage Asada" | 2:25 |
| 8. | "The Map" | 2:41 |
| 9. | "That's a Horse of a Different Color" | 3:34 |
| 10. | "I'd Buy That for a Dollar" | 3:06 |
| 11. | "Inside Job" | 3:03 |
| 12. | "It Don't Make Me No Nevermind" | 3:10 |
| Total length: | | 37:52 |

== Additional info ==
- On August 6, 2013, the band released the music video for "Boat Paddle" via their Facebook page to coincide with the release of the album.
- As of August 7, 2013, a full album stream (via SoundCloud) is still available on Loudwire in an article to promote the album. It includes every track of the album, with the exception of "The Map". The article was written by the website's Senior Writer Graham 'Gruhamed' Hartmann, and was published on July 30, 2013.

== Personnel ==
Iwrestledabearonce

- Steven Bradley – guitar, programming, engineering, mastering, mixing
- John Ganey – guitar, programming
- Mikey Montgomery – drums
- Mike "Rickshaw" Martin – bass
- Courtney LaPlante – lead vocals

Guest appearances

- Steve Vai – guitar on "Carnage Asada"

Production

- Steven Bradley – production

Artwork

- Aaron Marsh
