= The Price of Existence =

Studio album by All Shall Perish
- Released: August 8, 2006
- Recorded: March–May, 2006
- Studios: Castle Ultimate Studios, Emeryville, California
- Genres: Deathcore; melodic death metal
- Length: 43:20
- Label: Nuclear Blast
- Producer: Zack Ohren

All Shall Perish chronology
Hate, Malice, Revenge (2003)	The Price of Existence (2006)	Awaken the Dreamers (2008)

Professional ratings
Review scores
Source	Rating
AllMusic	3.5/5 stars
Blabbermouth.net	8.5/10
Ultimate Guitar	9.7/10

The Price of Existence is the second album by American deathcore band All Shall Perish, released in 2006. This is their first album to feature vocalist Eddie Hermida and lead guitarist Chris Storey. It has sold approximately 20,000 records worldwide. The bonus tracks on the Korean release are actually two tracks from the band's previous album Hate, Malice, Revenge.

It is considered to be a defining album in the deathcore genre.

== Music and lyrics ==
The album makes use of groove and melody. Alternative Press said the band "found their sound by giving death metal that core touch, with an abundance of breakdowns, gang vocals and an inability to let up on the aggression."

Themes explored include corporate greed, anti-fascism and environmentalism.

The title of track 4 is a quote from prominent environmentalist David Brower. The song's theme also matches Brower's opinion on how the Earth is dying and his concern about mankind disregarding mother nature.

Track 7 is an instrumental song, its title, "Greyson" is the name of rhythm guitarist Ben Orum's then-newborn son.

== Track listing ==
No.	Title	Length
1.	"Eradication"	3:56
2.	"Wage Slaves"	3:44
3.	"The Day of Justice"	3:33
4.	"There Is No Business to Be Done on a Dead Planet" (featuring Mike "Gunface" McKenzie of The Red Chord)	3:03
5.	"Better Living Through Catastrophe"	5:00
6.	"Prisoner of War"	4:44
7.	"Greyson" (instrumental)	2:14
8.	"We Hold These Truths..."	3:44
9.	"The True Beast"	3:37
10.	"Promises"	3:04
11.	"The Last Relapse"	6:41
Total length:		43:20

Korean version bonus tracks
No.	Title	Length
12.	"Laid to Rest"	4:43
13.	"Sever the Memory"	5:10
Total length:		53:13

== Personnel ==
All Shall Perish

- Hernan "Eddie" Hermida – vocals
- Chris Storey – lead guitar
- Ben Orum – rhythm guitar
- Mike Tiner – bass
- Matt Kuykendall – drums

Production

- Engineered by Zack Ohren at Castle Ultimate Studios, Oakland, California
