= Antagony =

American deathcore/metalcore band

- Origin: Bay Area, California, U.S.
- Genres: Deathcore, metalcore
- Years active: 1998–2009, 2019–present
- Label: Deepsend
- Members: Nick Vasallo; Ben Orum; Carlos Saldana; Luis Martinez; Bray Almini
- Past members: Jody Handy; Justin Hughes; Caysen Russo; Kyle Anderson; Christian Mitchell; Phil Cancilla; Brian Camara; Ryan Rey
- Website: facebook.com/sporadicore

Antagony is an American deathcore/metalcore band from the Bay Area of California, United States, formed in 1998, disbanded in 2009, and reformed in 2019. The group are noted for combining their metalcore style with a remarkable amount of death metal influence, which has led to the group to being considered one of the pioneers of the deathcore genre. Antagony has released three albums, each on a different record label. Members of Antagony have gone on to form bands such as Oblivion and All Shall Perish.

== History ==
Antagony formed in 1998 by former members of the metalcore band Y.F.H. Founding members Nick Vasallo, Carlos Saldana, Ben Orum, and Jody Handy combined elements from disparate forms of extreme music: grindcore, hardcore, death metal, tribal drumming and doom into one sonic experience. They showcased their eclectic mix of styles in their first release, an EP entitled Expect the Worst, and followed it with their first US tour. With a new drummer (Justin Hughes), their first album, See Through These Eyes, released in 2001, further refined their style. Soon after, Antagony became one of the premier extreme metal groups in the Bay Area underground performing with such acts as Malevolent Creation, Incantation, Excruciating Terror, Pig Destroyer, Grimple, Dystopia, Capitalist Casualties, Cephalic Carnage, Brujeria, Vital Remains, Cattle Decapitation, Intronaut, Disgorge, Exhumed, Obituary, As I Lay Dying, and Monstrosity.

After their Triangle of Hate Tour U.S.A. 2001, with supporting acts End of All and Boof, Antagony fell into a period of inactivity with all of their members directing their energies into other projects.

By the time Antagony resurfaced with a new lineup (Kyle Anderson, Christian Mitchell, and Carlos Saldana replacing Ben Orum, Bray Almini, and Caysen Russo), Antagony strived to catch up on time away from the evolving metal scene. Antagony finally released the long-awaited Rebirth in 2005, combining material they had written since 2001. Although well received by fans and critics, it was a record that should have been released two years before.

With their next album, Days of Night, Antagony wished to shed their previous attempt at appeasing the audience. This was to be their most eclectic recording to date. The album employed use of cellos, broken pianos, choirs, different simultaneous metronome markings, and several layers of overdubbing. Musically, this album was a lot more "classically" structured as well; previously Antagony depended on the use of constant sectional changes to catch listeners off guard. This proved especially effective when performing live and this variation form they put into their early sound definitely influenced their peers. Justin parted ways with Antagony during the recording of the album, but performs on three of the tracks ("The Truth Will Be Known", "Exhale Her Poison", and "Voyage").

Antagony parted ways in 2009 after 10 years of existence. Founding members Nick Vasallo and Ben Orum joined forces again to form the death metal band Oblivion.

== Band members ==
Current lineup

- Nick Vasallo - vocals, guitar (1998-2009, 2019-), bass (2008-2009)
- Ben Orum - guitar (1998-2004, 2019-) vocals (1998-2003)
- Carlos Saldana - bass guitar (1998-2001) vocals (2004-2009, 2019-)
- Bray Almini - bass (2002-2004, 2019-)
- Luis Martinez - drums (2008-2009, 2019-)

Former members

- Jody Handy - drums (1998-2000; died 2009)
- Justin Hughes - drums (2000-2007)
- Cayson Russo - vocals (2003)
- Christian Mitchell - bass (2004-2008)
- Phil Cancilla - drums (2007)
- Brian Camera - drums (2007-2008)
- Kyle Anderson - guitar (2004-2009)
- Ryan Rey - guitar (2006-2009)

Timeline

== Discography ==
Studio albums

Album details	Released
See Through These Eyes: Label: Sporadicore Records	June 1, 2001
Rebirth: Label: None	June 1, 2005
Days of Night: Label: Deepsend Records (DSR 041)	December 21, 2008
Ashes: Label: None	May 24, 2019

== Music videos ==
Year	Title	Director
2002	"Cultivate and Collapse"	Carlos Saldana
2008	"Days of Night"	Carlos Saldana
