= Louis Navellier =

Chairman and Founder of Navellier & Associates in Reno, Nevada

Louis G. Navellier
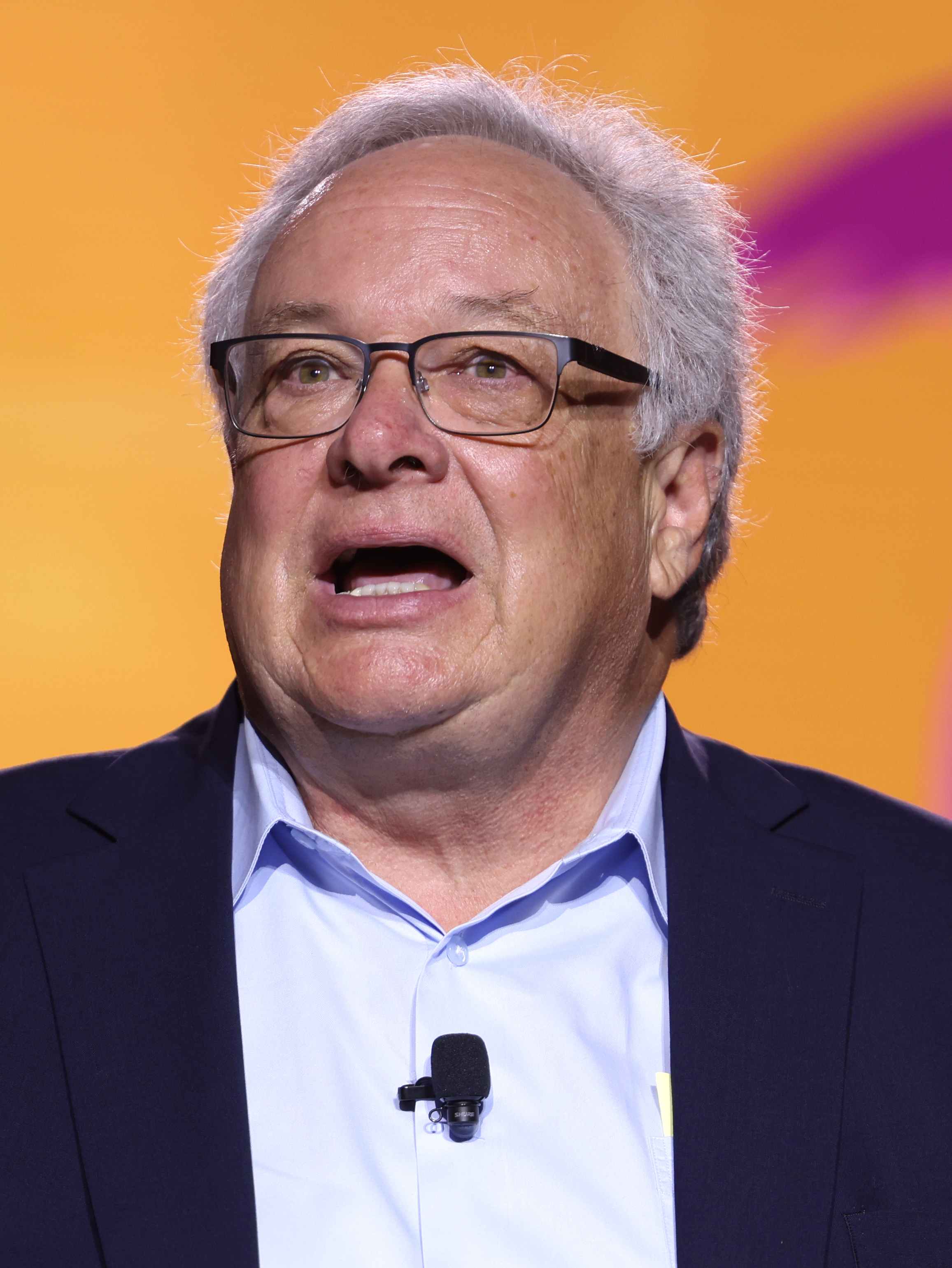
- Navellier in 2025
- Born: November 22, 1957 (age 68); Alameda County, California, U.S.
- Known for: Chairman and Founder of Navellier & Associates

Louis G. Navellier (born November 22, 1957) is an American investor and financial commentator. He is the chairman and founder of Navellier & Associates in Reno, Nevada, which manages approximately $1.5+ billion in assets. Navellier also writes five investment newsletters focused on growth investing: Growth Investor, Breakthrough Stocks, Accelerated Profits, Power Options and Platinum Growth Club, and can frequently be seen giving his market outlook and analysis on Bloomberg, Fox News, and CNBC.

== Early life and education ==
Navellier was born in 1957, in Berkeley, California. His father, Ernest, served during World War II as a turret gunner on a B-26 bomber, and became a bricklayer after the war. Ernie Navellier passed away in 2002. Ernie's wife and Louis's mother, Eve, passed away in 2021 at age 99. Ernie and Eve married in 1955. Louis was their only child. Eve had a son from a previous marriage.

Louis Nevallier attended college at the School of Business & Economics at Cal State Hayward, now Cal State East Bay. He graduated in 1978 at the age of 20 with a B.S. in Finance, and then got his MBA in 1979.

== Career ==
While at Cal State, Navellier took part in a research project in which the goal was to mimic the S&P 500’s performance. During this project Navellier discovered some methods beating the market using quantitative and fundamental analysis.

Navellier employs a three-step, highly disciplined, bottom-up stock selection process, focusing on quantitative analysis, fundamental analysis, and optimization of the securities selected for the portfolio. In 1980, Navellier began publishing his research in his stock advisory newsletter, the MPT Review. Since 1987, he has been active in the management of individual portfolios, mutual funds, and institutional portfolios.

In 1980, Navellier began publishing MPT Review, a monthly newsletter for individual investors. In 1997 he partnered with publisher InvestorPlace Media, LLC (formerly Phillips Investment Resources, LLC) to launch The Blue Chip Growth Letter, which applied the investment strategy used in MPT Review to strictly blue chip stocks. In January 2005 Navellier and InvestorPlace Media re-launched MPT Review, renaming it Emerging Growth. The Hulbert Financial Digest rated the Emerging Growth newsletter as the number one performer in the 20-year category from 1985–2005, among 32 surviving newsletters. Hulbert estimated that from 1985 through 2008, following the advice of that newsletter would have resulted in a gain of about 2,156% according to The Hulbert Financial Digest.

During the same time period the S&P 500 index had an increase of about 869%.

Navellier also writes four investment newsletters focused on growth investing: the Growth Investor, Breakthrough Stocks, Accelerated Profits, and Platinum Growth Club newsletters.

On Jan. 23, 2009, Louis Navellier launched an exchange-traded fund, the RevenueShares Navellier Overall A-100 Fund (ticker symbol RWV). This ETF searched a database of nearly 5,000 stocks for the best companies according to Navellier's top fundamental factors such as sales growth, earnings growth and cash flow. The ETF holdings were rebalanced quarterly. In honor of the new fund, Louis Navellier rang the opening bell on Wall Street for New York Stock Exchange on Friday, February 13, 2009.

In 2016, the SEC charged Louis Navellier & Navellier & Associates, Inc. for fraud pertaining to failure to disclose supplemental sub-advisor information in marketing materials. Specifically, Navellier & Associates, Inc. performed GIPS (Global Investment Performance Standards) accounting for the F2’s sub-advisor’s performance, which was audited, certified, and represented actual account performance. Navellier & Associates’ compliance officer relied on NASDAQ OMX for due diligence regarding the sub-advisor’s background and performance. The First Circuit Court of Appeals ruled that relying on NASDAQ OMX was insufficient for due diligence and concluded that Navellier did not sell the sub-advisor, did not manage the sub-advisor’s assets, but was deemed “causally connected” and ordered to disgorge approximately $30 million. The F-2 sub-advisor had generated approximately $221 million for Navellier & Associates, Inc. clients.

== Authorship ==
Navellier has been covered by a wide range of international media. In addition to appearing on CNBC, Bloomberg, The Nightly Business Report, and Wall Street Week, he has been featured in Barron's, Forbes, Fortune, Investor's Business Daily, Money, Smart Money, and The Wall Street Journal. Most recently he was profiled in Kenneth A. Stern's book Secrets of the Investment All-Stars in the interview "Louis Navellier, A Man Who Has Beat Them All." He is also featured in Alan R. Ackerman's Investing Under Fire: Winner Strategies from the Masters for Bulls, Bears, and the Bewildered.

In October 2007, Navellier's book, The Little Book That Makes You Rich, was released. It is part of the John Wiley & Sons “Little Book, Big Profits” series. In 2025, Louis Navellier and David Evanson published with John Wiley & Sons “The Sacred Truths of Investing: Finding Growth Stocks that Will Make You Rich.”

== Personal life ==
Navellier married his wife Wendy in 1995. They live in Manalapan, Florida. Navellier has a daughter, Natalie (née Navellier) Holden (born c. 1986) from a previous marriage. Natalie and her husband, Jared Holden, have three sons. Louis Navellier and his wife, Wendy, have a son, Chase (b. 1996), and a daughter, Crystal (b. 2000). Chase has two master's degrees from Stanford. Crystal graduated from Cornell, has a Masters of Fine Arts from Columbia University, and produces Navellier Market Buzz on YouTube.
