= Nicholas Vasallo =

American composer (born 1979)

- Born: October 28, 1979 (age 46)
- Origin: Oakland, California, U.S.
- Genres: 21st-century classical music; experimental; deathcore
- Occupations: Composer; professor; sound designer; bassist; vocalist; martial artist
- Instruments: Vocals; guitar; bass guitar
- Years active: 1998–present
- Member of: Oblivion; Antagony
- Website: nickvasallo.com

Nicholas Roy Vasallo (born October 28, 1979) is an American composer. In 1997, Vasallo graduated from Monte Vista High School in Danville, California, where he began his musical career as a guitarist and vocalist in a hardcore band called Y.F.H., later Antagony. He has been credited as being the father of extreme metal genre deathcore. Vasallo has since evolved from a metal musician into an award-winning composer and professor of music. He is best known for his compositions combining heavy metal sounds and aesthetics with experimental classical techniques. He has released four albums containing his compositions with different independent labels. His music is published by Santa Barbara Music Publishers and released by Neuma Records and Innova Recordings. Vasallo is of Filipino and Taiwanese descent.

== Biography ==
Vasallo graduated from Diablo Valley College with an AA in music industry studies in 2003, and California State University, East Bay with a BA in music composition in 2007. As a Chancellor's Fellow at University of California, Santa Cruz, Vasallo completed his MA in 2009 and subsequently went on to finish his DMA in 2011 as a President's Fellow. His teachers included David Evan Jones, Paul Nauert, David Cope, Hi-Kyung Kim, Frank La Rocca, Jeffrey Miller, Rafael Hernandez, Ken Ueno, and Francois Rose.

He was an assistant professor at California State Polytechnic University, Pomona; lecturer at California State University, East Bay, Gavilan College, University of California, Santa Cruz, and Los Medanos College. Vasallo is the director of music industry studies at Diablo Valley College. Vasallo is also a passionate martial artist, he practices Jiu Jitsu and teaches Muay Thai Kickboxing at Danville Jiu Jitsu, Wrestling, and Kickboxing. He is also the creator and head instructor of the Muay Thai program at Global Martial Arts University.

Career

As a composer, Vasallo's work has encompassed a variety of genres and projects. Most notably with his extreme metal band Oblivion, deathcore band Antagony, film music career, and concert music works. Polystylism or Eclecticism has been linked to his compositions which range from electronic, electroacoustic, orchestral, chamber music, solo, choral, and various instrumentations utilizing the overdriven sound of electric guitar. His compositional approach involves mixing disparate elements from Extreme Metal to Taiko, Experimental, Spectral Music, Electronic Music, Algorithmic Music, and various 21st-century compositional techniques. Vasallo is a recipient of the 2010/2011 President's $21k Dissertation-Year Fellowship, the first Arts student to ever receive the honor.

His music has been performed internationally by groups such as Contemporary Music Ensemble Korea, Del Sol String Quartet, San Francisco Choral Artists, Atlanta Schola Cantorum, and Watsonville Taiko. Vasallo models his musical structures on extra-musical phenomenon, including pre-constructed narrative events either created on his own or appropriated. He describes musical ideas and instruments as "complex and surprising characters that exist in reality or imagination." Vasallo's ongoing goal is to hybridize extreme metal with modern classical music. He often designs sound worlds using acoustic instruments with electronic/digital manipulations.

As a performer, Vasallo is active as a bassist and extreme metal vocalist. He is currently the lead vocalist and songwriter for the extreme metal band Oblivion.

== Awards ==
- 2020 UCSC Distinguished Graduate Alumni Award
- 2017 Cal State East Bay “40 Under 40” Award
- 2015 The American Prize in Composition for When the War Began
- 2015 Washington Composers Forum "Inverted Space" Winner for When the War Began
- 2015 36th Annual Telly Award for "Make Dreams Happen – Cal Poly Pomona's Steinway Initiative"
- 2014 Cal Poly Pomona Provost's Award for Excellence in Teaching Nomination
- 2013 San Francisco Classical Voice Music Educator Award First Runner-up
- 2012 Henryk Mikołaj Górecki International Composers Competition
- 2011 Indiana State University Contemporary Music Festival Music Now Composition Award
- 2011 Truman State University/MACRO Composition Award
- 2011 All the Cool Parts Idol Winner
- 2010/2011 President's Dissertation-Year Fellowship Winner
- 2009/2010 UCSC Music Department Discretionary Funds Award
- 2009 San Francisco Choral Artists New Voices Award
- 2009 Porter College Graduate Arts Research Grant Award
- 2008 David Cope Award for Compositional Excellence
- 2008 Seattle Pianist Collective Award
- 2008 UCSC Student Orchestral Competition Winner
- 2008 60x60 Project (Pacific Rim mix) Official Selection
- 2007/2008/2009 UCSC Chancellors Doctoral Fellowship
- 2007 CSUEB Student Choral Competition Winner

== Discography ==
Studio albums

Year	Album details
2007	The Burning: Released: 2007; Label: Ars Nova Classics (ARSNOVA 0105)
2011	let the machines do it for us: Released: 2011; Label: Kunaki(PX00ISYXUX)
2012	Monuments Emerge: Released: 2012; Label: Innova Recordings(innova 821)
2022	Apophany: Released: 2022; Label: Neuma Records(Neuma 150)
