= All Shall Perish =

American deathcore band

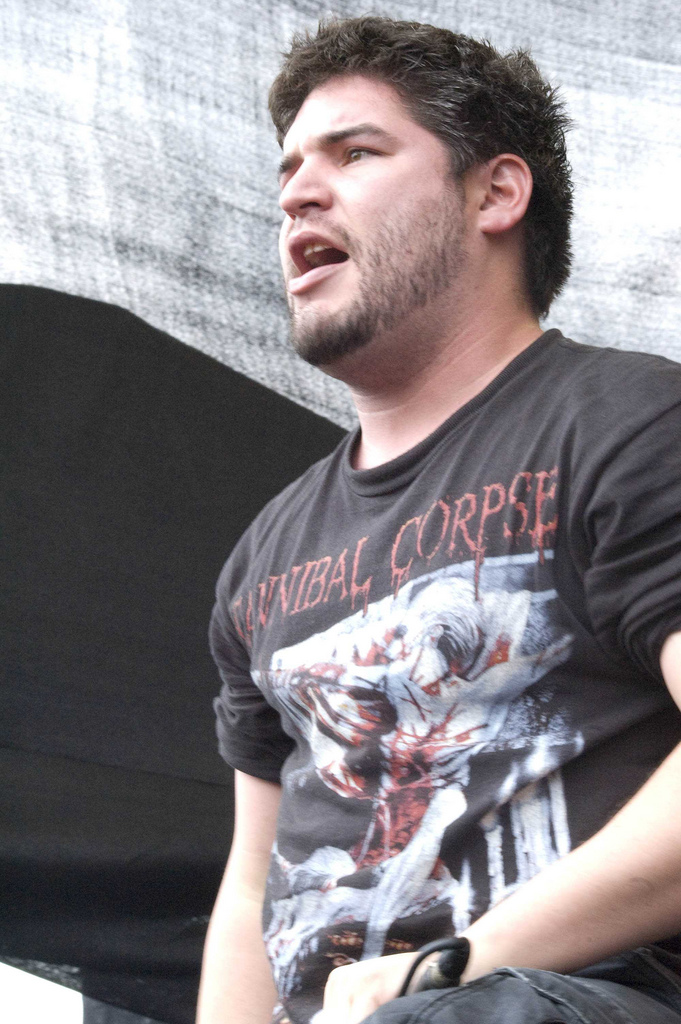
- Vocalist Hermida in 2008

Background information
- Origin: Oakland, California, U.S.
- Genre: Deathcore
- Years active: 2002–2020; 2024–present
- Label: Nuclear Blast
- Members: Eddie Hermida; Ben Orum; Matt Kuykendall; Chris Storey
- Past members: Craig Betit; Caysen Russo; Mike Tiner; Adam Pierce; Francesco Artusato; Rob Maramonte; Jason Richardson
- Website: allshallperish.com

All Shall Perish is an American deathcore band from Oakland, California, formed in 2002. The band was signed to Nuclear Blast and has released four full-length albums through the label. Their latest album, This Is Where It Ends, was released in 2011.

All Shall Perish are noted as one of the earliest pioneers of the deathcore genre.

== History ==
=== Formation and Nuclear Blast signing (2002–2008) ===
All Shall Perish was founded in 2002 from the former members of the San Francisco Bay Area bands Antagony, End of All, and Boof. The founding members were Ben Orum, Matt Kuykendall, Mike Tiner, Caysen Russo, and Craig Betit. The band released their demo in 2003 and caught the attention of Japanese label Amputated Vein Records. On August 19, 2003, they released their debut album Hate, Malice, Revenge, which was re-released by Nuclear Blast in 2005. In 2006, The Price of Existence was released, with its first single, "Eradication," filmed and played on MTV2's Headbangers Ball. A viral video of the song "There Is No Business to Be Done on a Dead Planet" set to the boy-band 'N Sync's video for "Bye Bye Bye" helped to garner a new fanbase for the band.

The group released their third studio album, Awaken the Dreamers, on September 16, 2008, through Nuclear Blast. It debuted at number 126 on the Billboard 200 and number 1 on the Top Heatseekers charts, with 5,500 copies sold in its first week. Vocalist Craig Betit and lead guitarist Caysen Russo only appear on the band's first studio album, and were replaced by Hernan "Eddie" Hermida and Chris Storey, respectively.

All Shall Perish completed several successful tours across America in 2006 and also appeared on the Darkness Over Europe 2007 tour. Bray Almini (Suffokate) occasionally filled in for Mike Tiner on bass during tours. In September 2008, they toured parts of Russia and became the first all-American metal band to tour Siberia, playing shows in Irkutsk, Novosibirsk, Tomsk, and Omsk. The band was also part of the European leg of the Hell On Earth Tour 2008. On November 11, 2008, the band recorded the video for their single "Never... Again," directed by Gary Smithson, in downtown Los Angeles.

=== Line-up changes (2009–2010) ===
On February 5, 2009, All Shall Perish stated on their website that they were parting ways with guitarist Chris Storey and replacing him with Jason Richardson. The band issued the following statement: "We will be doing all upcoming tours and fests! We have an unbelievable replacement named Jason Richardson. Can't wait to see everyone on the road! We will be doing a small headliner, the Atticus Clothing tour, and then a ton of major fests in Europe. We have some surprises in store as well!"

After finishing the Night of the Living Shred Tour, All Shall Perish returned to California, where they began writing a new album. Mike Tiner stated that the process was "going slow, very slow." In early 2010, Richardson left All Shall Perish to join Born of Osiris. On June 5, 2010, the band announced a new line-up. Drummer Matt Kuykendall, one of the founding members, was replaced by Adam Pierce (formerly of Sea of Treachery), and Francesco Artusato (Hiss of Atrocities) became the band's third lead guitarist. The only original member remaining is Mike Tiner.

=== This Is Where It Ends and departure of Hermida (2010–2015) ===
On November 8, 2010, the band announced they were starting work on a new album. Guitarist Ben Orum said on the band's official website, "After two very successful tours at home and abroad, we are now home writing the new All Shall Perish record! The writing process is flowing very naturally, and so far the material itself is very impressive. It is safe to say this will be one of the most aggressive, epic, groovy records we have ever written. I cannot wait to start playing this material live." On January 31, 2011, the band was announced to be billed on the fourth annual Mayhem Festival, playing on the Revolver Stage alongside other metal acts including Suicide Silence, Machine Head, Straight Line Stitch, and Testament.

Their fourth full-length album, titled This Is Where It Ends, was released on July 26, 2011, in United States and July 29, 2011, in Europe. A legal organization named World Digital filed suit on April 20, 2012, against 80 fans for $150,000 for allegedly using BitTorrent to download this album. This action by the company was done without the band's permission or knowledge, and as a result, All Shall Perish sided with their fans against the lawsuit. The lawsuit was dropped by request of the band.

On October 3, 2013, Hermida joined Suicide Silence, which was officially announced on the band's Facebook page. A day later, All Shall Perish released a statement about Hermida leaving and confirmed that the band would continue. An interview with Mike Tiner on the Metal Injection website stated that Tiner's position was that Hermida chose to leave by not being able to commit to the band and making Suicide Silence his priority.

=== Return of original lineup and disbandment (2015–2020) ===
On October 21, 2015, All Shall Perish announced the return of Hernan "Eddie" Hermida and guitarist Chris Storey, alongside founding members Matt Kuykendall, Caysen Russo, and Ben Orum. The group's press release noted that original vocalist Craig Betit will participate in some fashion as well. The band stated that bassist Mike Tiner, the last original member in the lineup before Orum's return, declined a personal invitation to participate. Francesco Artusato and drummer Adam Pierce were confirmed to no longer be part of the band.

On April 20, 2019, the band revealed they were working on new music despite the inactivity since their last announcement. A year later, on April 21, 2020, vocalist Hernan "Eddie" Hermida announced that the reunion was no longer happening.

=== Reunion (2024–present) ===
On January 31, 2024, the band announced they were reuniting to play the Big Texas Metal Fest in May. One week later, the band announced a second reunion show at the Inkcarceration Festival in July. The live line-up consists of Hernan "Eddie" Hermida (vocals), Ben Orum (guitar), Chris Storey (guitar) and Andrew Baird (drums; ex-Fallujah). Original drummer Matt Kuykendall does not play live, but has been seen on stage with the cowbell for 'Wage Slaves' and hailed by Eddie as "the man that started this band". In 2026, the band released two singles, "Be as Kings, Be as Gods" and "Led to Slaughter." This was due to a crowdfunding campaign spearheaded by themselves with plans to release their own full length album in over a decade, which also included a tour across the United States as the headliner. The bands Carnifex, Dismemberment, Extermination & Mauled joined alongside for their 20th Anniversary of the Price of Existence Tour.

== Musical style, influences and lyrical themes ==
All Shall Perish is often described as a deathcore band, but they have incorporated metalcore and technical death metal into their sound over the years. Much of the band is influenced by European metal, particularly Swedish death metal. Their influences are by a large number of groups, including Opeth, Cannibal Corpse, At the Gates, Dying Fetus, Tenacious D, Blood Has Been Shed, Hatebreed, The Beatles, Journey, Michael Jackson, Queen, The Police, Harry Belafonte, Rusty Cooley, Gwar, Dissection, Dimmu Borgir, Carcass, Pantera and many others.

The band's lyrics explore several themes, including politics, such as government control, fascism, corporate control, and organised religion. For example, the song "Black Gold Reign" from Awaken the Dreamers references countries around the world adopting oil as the main source of currency. A majority of their songs are politically based. Although rare, the band wrote a few songs on personal subjects such as the song "In This Life of Pain" from the album This Is Where It Ends, and the song "Deconstruction," from the album Hate, Malice, Revenge, which was written about original vocalist Craig Betit's ex-girlfriend.

== Band members ==
Current members

- Hernan "Eddie" Hermida – vocals (2003–2013, 2015–2020, 2024–present)
- Ben Orum – rhythm guitar (2002–2012, 2015–2020, 2024–present), studio bass (2024–present)
- Chris Storey – lead guitar (2003–2009, 2015–2020, 2024–present)
- Matt Kuykendall – drums (2002–2010, 2015–2020, 2024–present), studio only (2024–2026)

Former members

- Mike Tiner – bass (2002–2015)
- Craig Betit – vocals (2002–2003, 2015–2020)
- Caysen Russo – lead guitar (2002–2003), bass (2015–2020)
- Jason Richardson – lead guitar (2009–2010)
- Francesco Artusato – lead guitar (2010–2015)
- Adam Pierce – drums (2010–2015)
- Rob Maramonte – rhythm guitar (2012–2015)

Former touring musicians

- Bray Almini – bass (2007)
- Joey Ellis – rhythm guitar (2006)
- Luke Jaeger – rhythm guitar (2008–2009)
- Adrian Oropeza – bass (2024–2026)
- Andrew Baird – drums (2024–2026)

Timeline

== Discography ==
Studio albums

- Hate, Malice, Revenge (2003)
- The Price of Existence (2006)
- Awaken the Dreamers (2008)
- This Is Where It Ends (2011)

== Music videos ==
Year	Title	Director
2003	"Deconstruction"	Carlos Saldana & Bray Almini
2006	"Eradication"	Richie Valdez
2008	"Never... Again" (currently unreleased)	Gary Smithson
2011	"There Is Nothing Left"	David Brodsky
2011	"Royalty Into Exile"	Tommy Jones
