= Deathcore =

Fusion of metalcore and death metal

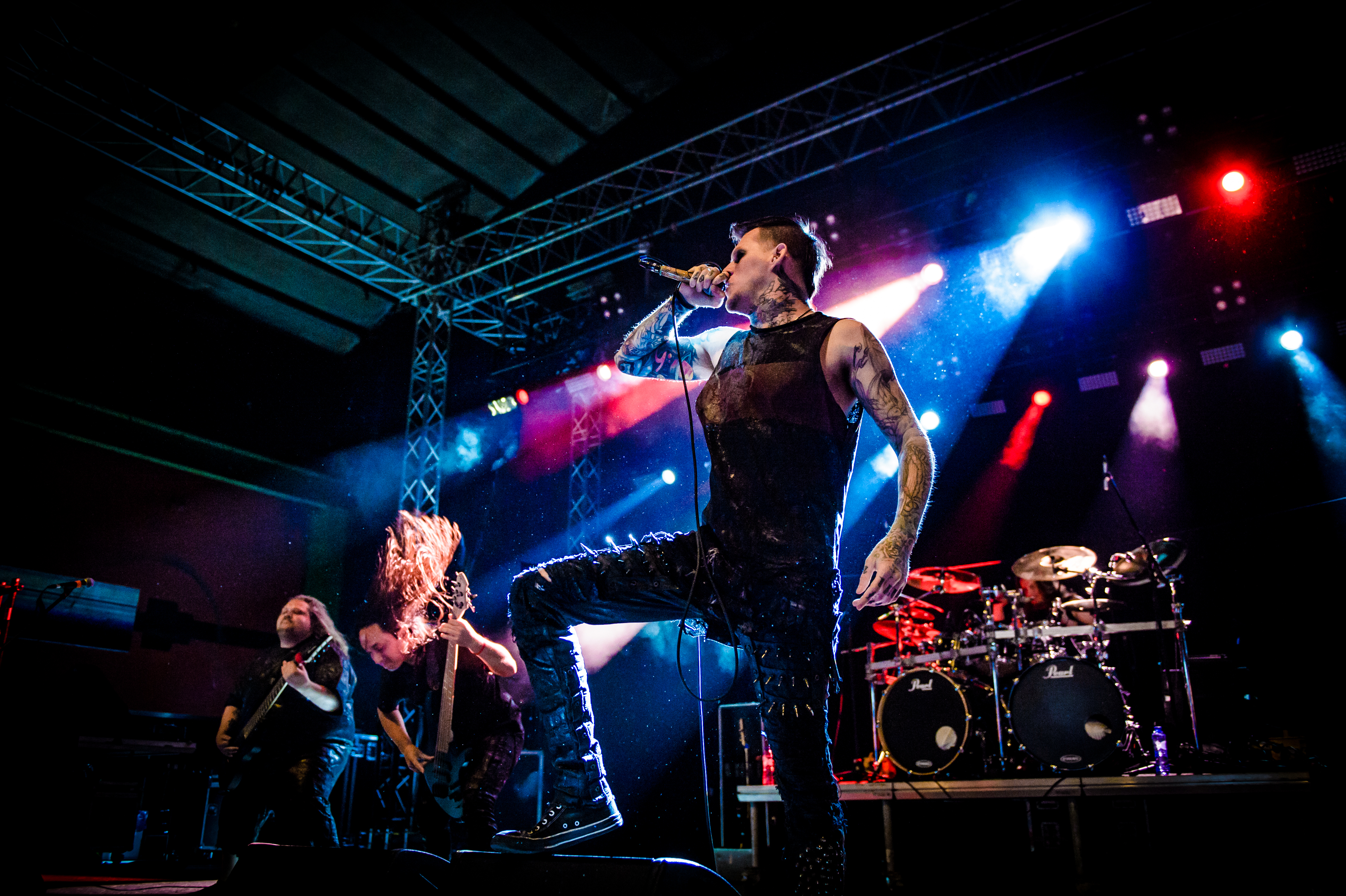
- Carnifex during a 2017 performance
- Etymology: Death metal + -core
- Stylistic origins: Death metal; metalcore; hardcore
- Cultural origins: early 2000s, North America

Other topics
- List of bands; nu metalcore; slam death metal

Deathcore is a fusion genre that combines metalcore with elements of death metal. The style typically includes metalcore breakdowns, simplified death metal guitar riffs, blast beats and vocals that alternate between low growling vocals and high-pitched screams or "pig squeals". Lyrics tend to be violent, angry and personal. As a distinct genre, deathcore emerged in the United States in the early 2000s and became popular in the later 2000s.

Some of the genre's earliest examples include Antagony, Despised Icon, and the Red Chord. In the mid-2000s, several deathcore bands gained widespread popularity, some of them through promotion on MySpace, including All Shall Perish, Suicide Silence, Through the Eyes of the Dead, Bring Me the Horizon, Job for a Cowboy, Carnifex, Whitechapel and Chelsea Grin. In the 2010s, deathcore bands began experimenting with a range of other genres.

Deathcore has been criticized by traditional extreme metal fans, usually for its association with metalcore, frequent use of hardcore-style breakdowns, and what they see as its simplistic riffs and commercialism. Some musicians classified as deathcore have rejected the label.

== Characteristics ==
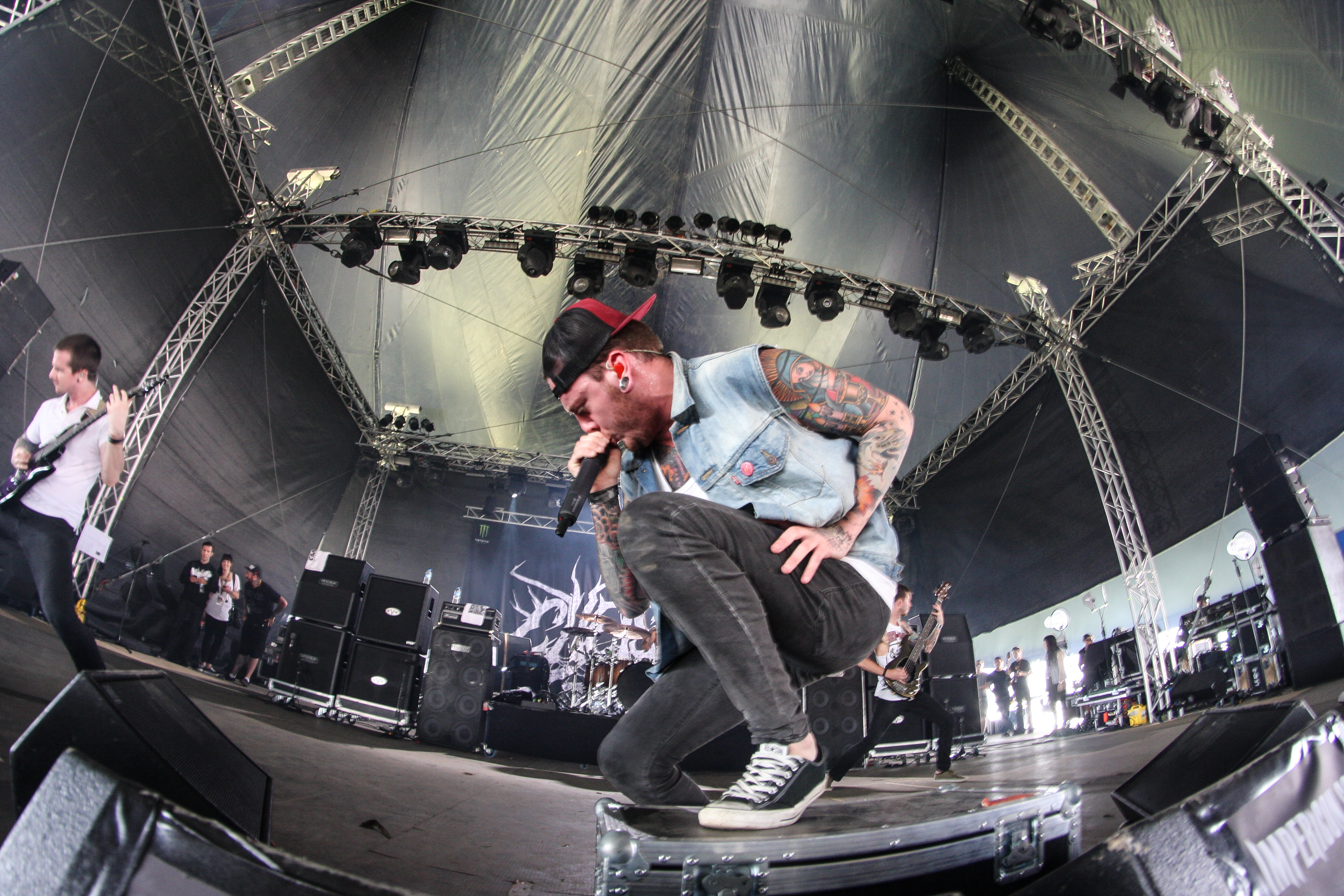
Deathcore band Chelsea Grin

A fusion genre, deathcore melds elements of metalcore, hardcore and death metal. It employs fast tempos and focuses on intensity. Deathcore typically features down-tuned guitars, death metal riffs; tremolo picking as well as double bass and blast beat drumming. It is defined by its slower intense sections called breakdowns, which are also a key trait of metalcore. The characteristic deathcore breakdown involves single palm muted notes played repeatedly on low open guitar strings. Unlike death metal, guitar solos are rare in deathcore, although they have been used by some bands.

Vocals in deathcore are typically a mixture of deep roaring vocals similar to death growls, and higher-pitched screaming found in metalcore. A vocal style known as "pig squeals" is also sometimes used, which can be performed either by inhaling or exhaling. Sung vocals are rare, but they have been used by a few bands such as All Shall Perish (in the song "Awaken the Dreamers") and Oceano (in the song "Incisions").

Lyrics in deathcore tend to be personal, angry and violent, often deal with male frustrations, and can include misogynistic language. Personal lyrics are common in metalcore, but rare in death metal. Some common lyrical themes are antireligion, psychological pain and body horror.

In terms of fashion, deathcore is associated with short hair, baseball caps, earlobe plugs and sportswear, which is similar to metalcore and hardcore fashion, and differs from the usual metalhead attire.

== History ==
=== Predecessors (1990s) ===
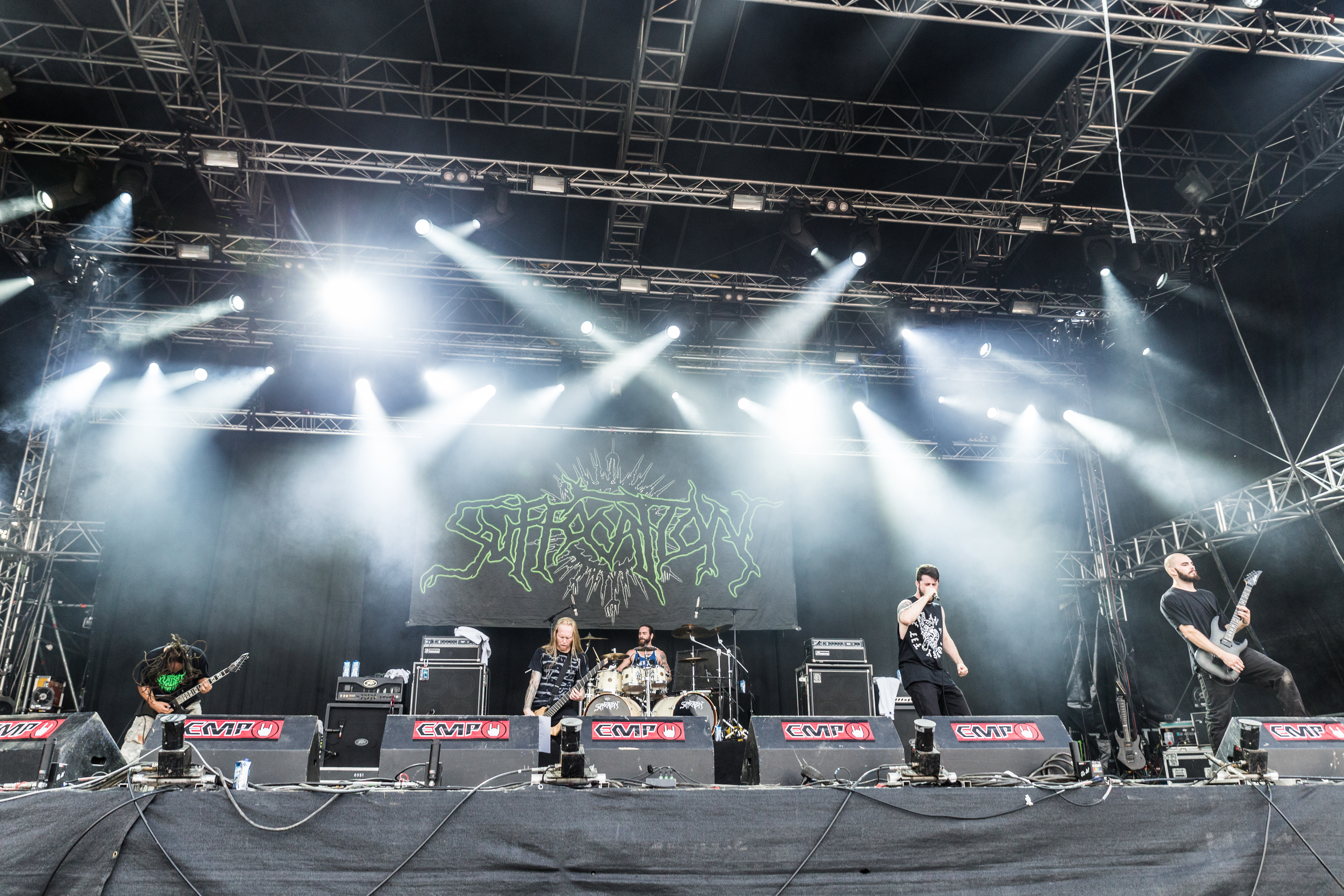
Death metal band Suffocation

The term "deathcore" has had a number of uses in various metal/hardcore scenes far before it was considered an established or recognized genre, with Dom Lawson of Metal Hammer writing: "blending death metal with hardcore was by no means a new thing when Despised Icon emerged." The earliest known use of "deathcore" as a word was by New York band N.Y.C. Mayhem as a self-description for their merger of hardcore punk and thrash metal. In 1996, Nick Terry of Terrorizer magazine publicized: "We're probably going to settle on the term deathcore to describe the likes of Earth Crisis (as well as the more NYHC-ish but still as deathly Merauder)." Embrace the Eternal (1998) by Embodyment, Yesterday Is Time Killed (1999) by Eighteen Visions, and Rain in Endless Fall (1999) by Prayer for Cleansing are early examples of albums that feature a metalcore sound combined with death metal influences. In 2019, music site The New Fury credited Embodyment as "[pioneers] of the deathcore genre" due to their performance on Embrace the Eternal.

Decibel magazine wrote that death metal band Suffocation were one of the main inspirations for the genre's emergence, stating "One of Suffocation's trademarks, breakdowns, has spawned an entire metal subgenre: deathcore." Suffocation bassist Derek Boyer says Suffocation "were influenced by many early metal and hardcore bands". Lawson cites death metal bands like Dying Fetus, Suffocation, and Internal Bleeding as being influential on deathcore due to their use of "crushing, mid-paced grooves and breakdowns".

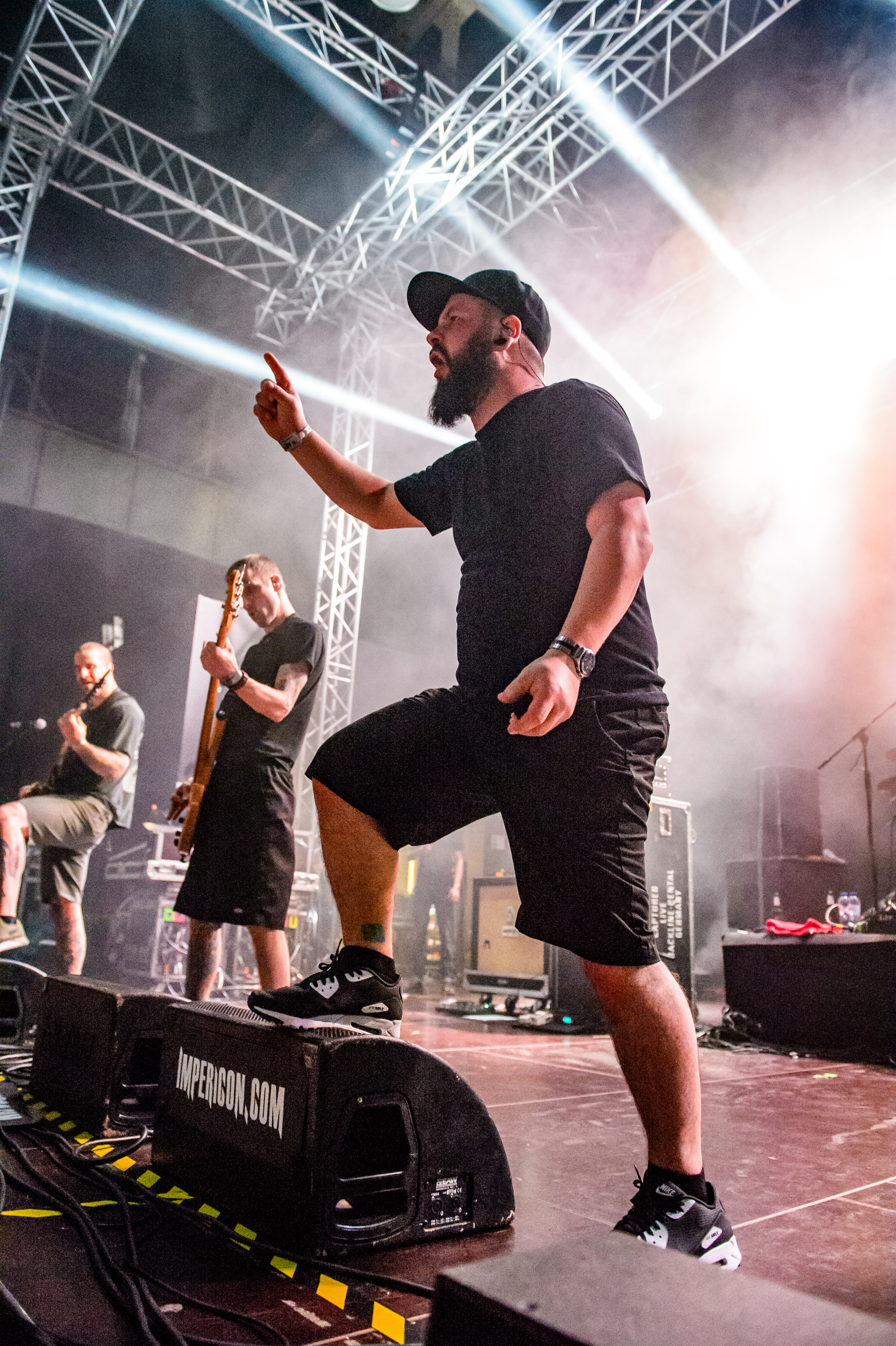
Despised Icon

=== Origins (early to mid-2000s) ===
Despite a few earlier metalcore/death metal hybridizations, Antagony and Despised Icon are considered to be the true pioneers of deathcore, though both bands have rejected the label. Antagony founder and frontman Nick Vasallo is credited as being the "father of deathcore" due to his work in the band. The Red Chord is referenced as an early influential source for the genre due to their hybridization of metalcore and death metal sounds, among other genres. New Hampshire band Deadwater Drowning and Californian group All Shall Perish are also seen as notable early entries of the genre. Deadwater Drowning's 2003 EP was remarked as "basically the blueprint for every current deathcore band out today," while All Shall Perish's debut album Hate, Malice, Revenge (2003) "never got tied down to [simply] death metal or metalcore." Music journalist T Coles said, "in a similar fashion to their grindcore ancestors, cultural barriers melted away as kids with earnest interests in various heavy sounds melded ideas together [...] they were earnestly trying to be as ruthlessly heavy as possible, taking elements from everything they liked and pushing them as hard as they could, just as bands [in the 1990s], and a decade before that, had done."

In the mid 2000s, deathcore spiked in popularity shortly after Job for a Cowboy released their EP Doom in 2005, which is heavily credited as one of deathcore's most significant and influential releases for the genre. The genre saw an increase in popularity even further when English band Bring Me the Horizon released their deathcore debut full-length Count Your Blessings in 2006. The band were presented the 2006 Kerrang! Award for "Best British Newcomer" shortly after the album's release, though the band abandoned the genre soon thereafter.

=== Expansion (late 2000s and 2010s) ===
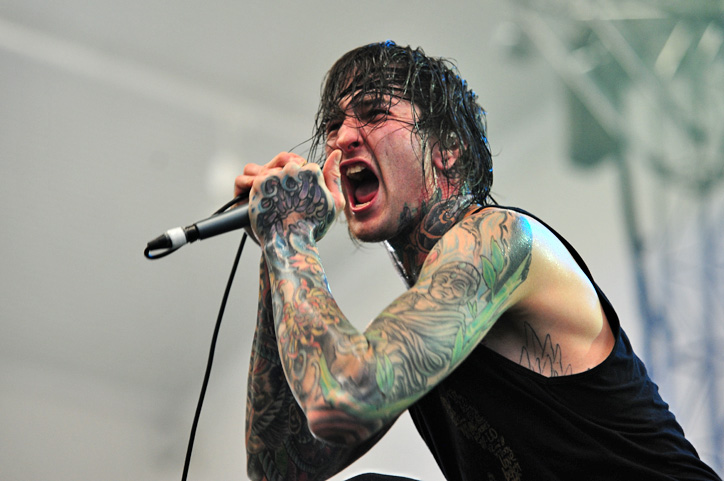
Mitch Lucker of Suicide Silence

San Diego natives Carnifex witnessed success with their first album Dead in My Arms (2007), selling 5,000 copies with little publicity. On top of their non-stop touring, the band's methodical songwriting resulted in Carnifex quickly getting signed to label Victory Records.

Suicide Silence's No Time to Bleed (2009) peaked at number 32 on the Billboard 200, number 12 on the Rock Albums Chart and number 6 on the Hard Rock Albums Chart, while their album The Black Crown peaked at number 28 on the Billboard 200, number 7 on the Rock Albums Chart and number 3 on the Hard Rock Albums Chart. Whitechapel album This Is Exile sold 5,900 in copies, which made it enter the Billboard 200 chart at position 118. Their third album A New Era of Corruption sold about 10,600 copies in the United States in its first week of being released and peaked at position number 43 on the Billboard 200 chart. Their self-titled album peaked at number 65 on the Canadian Albums Chart and also at number 47 on the Billboard 200.

In the late 2000s, deathcore groups began to embrace elements of nu metal, with Whitechapel and Suicide Silence making use of a "heavier and more groove-driven sound than their predecessors and increasingly bordered nu-metal", and Emmure, Winds of Plague and the Acacia Strain embracing its urban, black aesthetics. As early as 2011, publications including MetalSucks had begun to use the term "nu-deathcore" to refer to groups that hybridized the two such as Emmure, Suicide Silence, Here Comes the Kraken, Upon a Burning Body and Gorelord. This wave led Japanese band Dir En Grey to return to their nu metal influence sound while also embracing deathcore on songs such as "Different Sense".

Australian deathcore band Thy Art Is Murder debuted at number 35 on the ARIA Charts with their album Hate (2012), making them the first extreme metal band to ever reach the Top 40 of this chart.

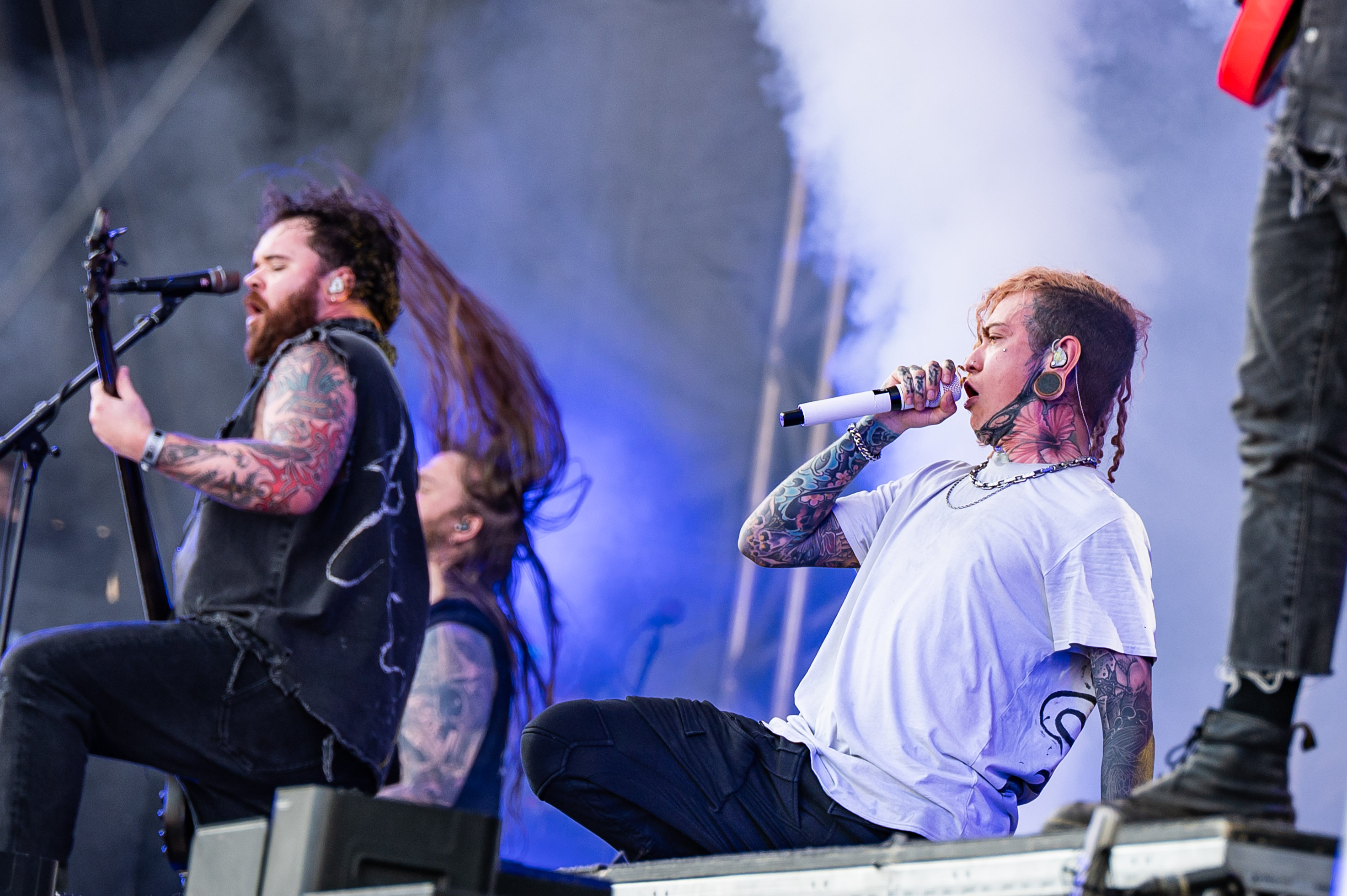
Lorna Shore at Tons of Rock 2025

In the 2020s, deathcore experienced a resurgence in popularity—especially on platforms like YouTube and TikTok, with bands like Fit for an Autopsy, Ingested, Paleface Swiss and AngelMaker bringing somewhat of a revived recognition to the genre. Lorna Shore, in particular, went viral with their 2021 song "To the Hellfire". Recent bands introduced more symphonic and progressive elements to the genre while maintaining its traditional heaviness. Russian deathcore group Slaughter to Prevail reportedly reached over 3.5 million streams on music services for their song "Hell" (2015); the band also performed a line of sold-out shows in China, which made the group the only foreign metal band to perform a sold-out concert in the country in all of 2020.

== Fusion with other genres ==
A variety of deathcore bands experimented with other genres into their music as influence and time progressed. Emmure has been credited to be heavily influenced by nu metal and was described as "the new Limp Bizkit". Suicide Silence's 2011 album The Black Crown is a deathcore album with some nu metal influences. Other examples of nu metal-inspired deathcore bands include Here Comes the Kraken's later material. The early 2010s saw bands fusing the genre with influences from djent and progressive metal, which began to achieve underground popularity. Examples of the aforementioned include Veil of Maya, Born of Osiris, and After the Burial. Some bands, such as Make Them Suffer, Lorna Shore and Winds of Plague, mix deathcore with symphonic/classical elements. French band Betraying the Martyrs has been described as "[the] punishing brutality of deathcore with melodic flourishes pulled from symphonic and progressive metal, giving it a theatricality that feels distinctly European."

== Backlash and rejection of the term ==
Deathcore has been widely criticized and rejected by traditional extreme metal audiences. Some metalheads criticize deathcore as an inauthentic imitation of "real metal" or as "a diluted misinterpretation of metal's stylistic codes" by outsiders. Music journalist Dom Lawson described deathcore as "metal's most maligned genre". When it emerged, deathcore was met with a backlash from death metal bands and audiences, who accused deathcore bands of stylistic misappropriation. This criticism has frequently been attributed to deathcore's incorporation of metalcore characteristics, including breakdowns, "pig squeal" vocals, and perceptions of simplistic riffing and commercialism. Music journalist T Coles argues that this criticism was compounded by the genre's increasing homogenization during the 2010s, which he attributes to an oversaturation of artists. Coles observed:

Whilst kids were eating this up, the old guard saw it as a further death blow. The established traditions were being tinkered with, old rules were being broken, and, having already lost out to Slipknot, it was now seeing its ideas taken and warped by a younger generation that was reaping the financial benefits.

Extreme metal and deathcore bands often play at the same festivals, but they use conflicting tropes in their lyrics and imagery and attract different types of fans. Metalheads, for example, have expressed frustration with what they call a more overt, macho 'bro' posturing in deathcore and metalcore.

Some deathcore musicians have rejected the label "deathcore". In an interview with vocalist Vincent Bennett of The Acacia Strain about the deathcore label, he said "Deathcore is the new nu-metal. [...] It sucks. And if anyone calls us 'deathcore' then I might do something very bad to them", but he would later express ambivalence towards the association, stating "sometimes I get it, sometimes I don't". Guitarist Justin Longshore from Through the Eyes of the Dead said, "You know, I really hate that term. I know we've been labeled as that but I think there's so much more to our music than just a mixture of death metal and hardcore even though we incorporate those elements in our music. To me it seems that is just the new and fresh thing that kids are following."

In November 2013, Terrorizer wrote, "The term 'deathcore' is usually seen as a dirty word in metal circles" while interviewing vocalist Bryce Lucien of the Texas-based metal band Seeker. Lucien then stated:

Much like what became of metalcore in the mid-2000s, deathcore is an often maligned term that can instantly diminish a bands credibility. What once conjured images of ridiculously brutal, unapologetically heavy bands like Ion Dissonance and The Red Chord now brings to mind bands full of twenty-year-olds sporting throat tattoos, matching black T-shirts, and trying desperately hard to look tough while they jump in sync onstage.

In contrast, some musicians are less negative towards being described as deathcore. Scott Lewis of the San Diego–based deathcore band Carnifex stated, "We're not one of those bands trying to escape the banner of deathcore. I know a lot of bands try and act like they have a big problem with that, but if you listen to their music, they are very 'deathcore.' I know that there is a lot of resentment towards deathcore and kind of younger bands." In a 2012 interview, former Chelsea Grin guitarist Jake Harmond said, "Everyone likes to flap their jaw and voice their own opinion how 'embarrassing' it is to be in a band that can be labeled 'deathcore,' but honestly we have never given a fuck".

== See also ==
- List of deathcore artists
