= Farewell, My Love (band) =

American rock band

- Origin: Phoenix, Arizona
- Genres: Rock; post-hardcore
- Years active: 2011–present (Current status unknown)
- Labels: CRCL Records, StandBy Records
- Members: Chad Kowal; Röbby Creasey; Charlee Conley; London Mckuffey
- Past members: Ryan Howell; Logan Thayer; Caleb Harbin; Gary Grant
- Website: fmlofficial.com

Farewell, My Love was an American rock band from Phoenix, Arizona, United States, formed in 2011. The group consisted of Chad Kowal (drums), Röbby Creasey (guitar), Charlee Conley (bass), Caleb Harbin (vocals), and London Mckuffey (guitar).

They have released four EPs and two studio albums. Their first EP A Dance You Won't Forget was released on August 16, 2011 independently. Their second EP Mirror, Mirror was released February 19, 2013 via StandBy Records. Their debut album Gold Tattoos was released September 10, 2013 via StandBy Records. They released their third EP, Wrapped Up In Pinstripes via StandBy Records on December 9, 2014. This was their first release with Chad Kowal on vocals.

== History ==
=== Formation and A Dance You Won't Forget ===
Farewell, My Love was formed by Chad Kowal, Röbby Creasey and Caleb Harbin in February 2011 in Phoenix, Arizona, with the intent to create a band with both a theatrical image and visual music. They later found bassist Gary Grant to complete the line-up.

In May, 2011, the band began recording their first EP A Dance You Won't Forget with Connor Hurley at L2 Studios in Scottsdale, Arizona.

In July of that year the band released their first single "Wrong & Right". in August the band's first EP A Dance You Won't Forget was released independently. Mirror, Mirror

Farewell, My Love then began to open for acts including Falling In Reverse, New Years Day, Get Scared and Blood On The Dance Floor.

=== Signing to Standby Records and recording debut album ===
On February 22, the band signed with StandBy Records. On April 16, bassist Gary Grant left the band and bassist Charlee Conley and guitarist Logan Thayer joined to the group. On October 8, the band announced that they would be heading out on 'The BryanStars Tour' this fall with Rocky Loves Emily, Late Nite Reading & CatchingYourClouds October 18-November 17.

On October 10, vocalist Caleb Harbin had announced his departure from the band.

In December, they entered Studio D in Cleveland, Ohio, with producer Don DeBiase to begin recording their debut album on StandBy Records.

=== "Mirror, Mirror" (2013) ===
On January 11, 2013, the band announced that they would embark on 'The BigsupporTOUR'; a west coast tour with Late Nite Reading February 15-March 3.

On January 25, the band debuted their new single "Mirror, Mirror" through alternative music news website AbsolutePunk, with plans to release their new EP of the same name on February 19 via StandBy Records.

Following that tour they announced that they would be a part of 'The BryanStars Tour #2' April 12-June 1 with such acts as Snow White's Poison Bite, Her Bright Skies, Joel Faviere, Late Nite Reading & CatchingYourClouds.

On April 4, the band announced that they would be going out on a co-headlining tour with Snow White's Poison Bite which would run through the entire summer & feature support from such acts as Kissing Candice & Chomp Chomp Attack.

On June 3, the band announced that they would be heading out on 'The Bad Blood Tour' September 4-December 22 with Blood On The Dance Floor, Haley Rose & The Relapse Symphony.

=== Gold Tattoos, The Bad Blood Tour (2013) ===
On July 31, the band announced that their debut album Gold Tattoos would be released on September 10 via StandBy Records.

On August 19, they premiered their new music video for "Mirror, Mirror" through Revolver (magazine)'s website.

On September 10, Gold Tattoos was released and rose to #43 on the Top Heatseekers Charts and several months on the Alternative Press Readers Charts. On that same day, their album was available to stream on Alternative Press's website.

=== Lineup Changes, Wrapped Up In Pinstripes, and Above It All (2014-present) ===
On January 14, the band announced that they would be a part of Alesana's 'The Decade Tour' March 7-April 6 to celebrate their 10th anniversary of being a band, the tour featured support from such acts as Get Scared, Hearts And Hands & Megosh.

On March 6, the band announced that they would be heading out on the 'We Own The Night' tour with Consider Me Dead, The Venetia Fair and Get Scared between April 18–26. In March, the band was chosen as 'One Of The 100 Bands You Need To Know In 2014' by Alternative Press Magazine.

On April 23, the band announced that they would be heading out on a summer headlining tour 'The Rock & Rebel Tour' June 10-August 15 with support from Jamie's Elsewhere, Incredible' Me & Lionfight. The tour was sponsored by The Artery Foundation and Substream Magazine.

On September 1, Ryan Howell and guitarist Logan Thayer departed the band and drummer Chad Kowal took over vocal duties. On December 9, 2014 the band released an Acoustic EP, Wrapped Up In Pinstripes on StandBy Records. It features Chad Kowal as the lead vocalist. This is their first release with Kowal on lead vocals. On December 1, 2014 the band entered the studio with producer Dan Parker to begin work on their second record.

On February 7, 2015, the band announced a tour with Requiem; the "Where Darkness Plays" tour.

On April 10, 2015, the band announced a tour called "Tours From The Crypt" with Famous Last Words, SycAmour & It Lives, It Breathes.

On April 20, 2015, the band announced a new guitarist, London Mckuffey. On June 17, 2016, the band announced their new album, Above It All, coming out on July 22.

In December, 2021, guitarist London Mckuffey stated the following on his YouTube channel about the current status of the band. "During the mixing process of our self titled EP Chad made the decision to put his full effort and attention into guest writing for EDM and pop artists and has had great success with that since. We released it anyways and it will always be something I’m proud of." The final verdict of whether or not the band will continue to make music or not is unknown.

== Band members ==
Current members

- Röbby Creasey - lead guitar, keyboards, piano (2011–present), rhythm guitar (2011–2012, 2014–2015), bass (2011)
- Charlee Conley - bass (2012–present)
- London Mckuffey - rhythm guitar (2015–present)

Past members

- Caleb Harbin - lead vocals (2011-2012)
- Gary Grant - bass (2011-2012)
- Ryan Howell - lead vocals (2012-2014)
- Logan Thayer - rhythm guitar (2012-2014)
- Chad Kowal - lead vocals (2014–2017), drums (2011–2017)

== Tours ==
=== 2012 ===
- BryanStars tour (with Rocky Loves Emily, Late Nite Reading, and CatchingYourClouds)

=== 2013 ===
- TheBigSupporTOUR (with Late Nite Reading)
- BryanStars Tour (with Snow White's Poison Bite, Her Bright Skies, Joel Faviere, Late Nite Reading, and CatchingYourClouds)
- Summer Tour (with Snow White's Poison Bite, Kissing Candice, and Chomp Chomp Attack)
- The Bad Blood Tour (with Blood On The Dance Floor, Haley Rose, and The Relapse Symphony)

=== 2014 ===
- The Decade Tour (with Alesana, Get Scared, Hearts & Hands, and Megosh)
- We Own The Night Tour (with Consider Me Dead, and The Venetia Fair)
- The Rock and Rebel Tour (with Jamie's Elsewhere, Incredible' Me, and Lionfight)

=== 2015 ===
- Where Darkness Plays Tour (with Requiem)
- Tours From The Crypt (with Famous Last Words, SycAmour & It Lives, It Breathes
- British Horror Story Tour (with Ashestoangels & The Dead XIII)

== Discography ==
=== EP's ===
- A Dance You Won't Forget (2011, Self-released)
- Mirror, Mirror (2013, StandBy Records)
- Wrapped Up In Pinstripes (2014, StandBy Records)
- Farewell, My Love (2018, CRCL Records)

=== Studio albums ===
- Gold Tattoos (2013, StandBy Records)
- Above It All (2016, CRCL Records)

=== Music Videos ===
- "Portraits" (2012)
- "Mirror Mirror" (2013)
- "Paper Forts (Acoustic)" (2013)
- "Crazy" (2016)
- "Burn Out The Night" (2016)
- "Never Stop" (2016)
- "Inside A Nightmare" (2016)
- "Maybe I" (2017)
