= Davey Suicide =

American rock band

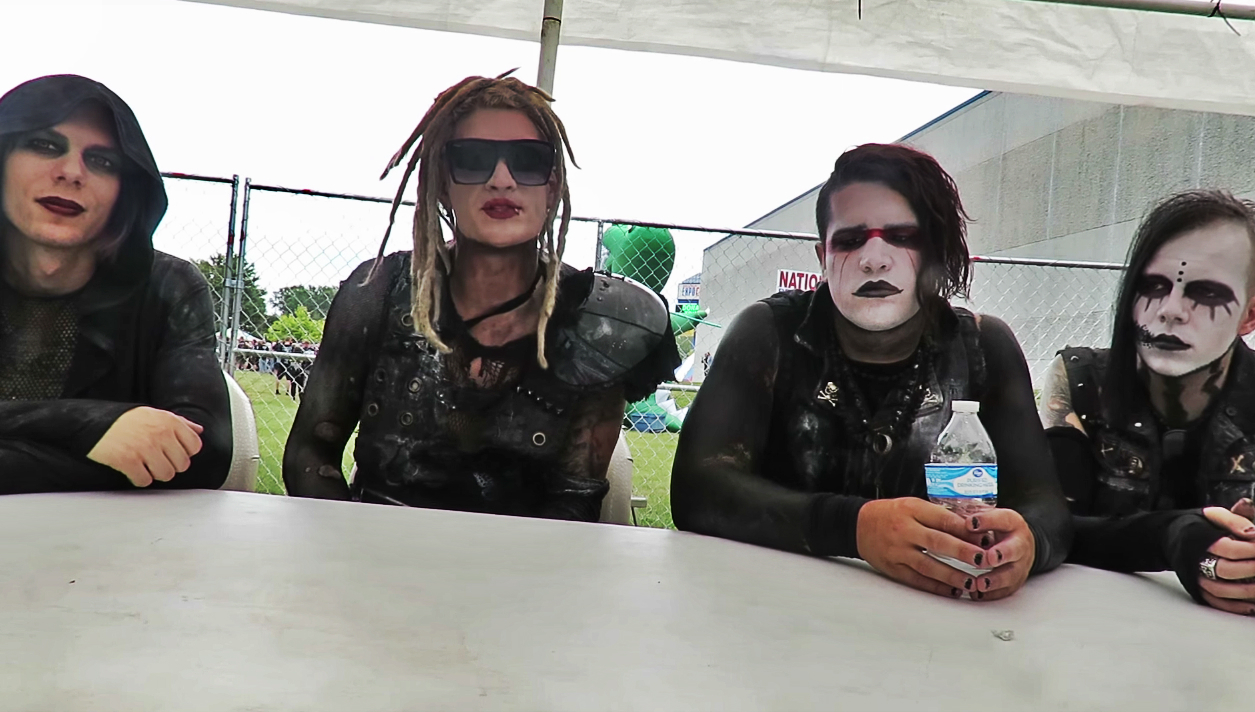
- Davey Suicide (in sunglasses) and his band members

Background information
- Origin: Hollywood, Los Angeles, California, U.S.
- Genres: Industrial metal, Alternative metal, Nu metal, Metalcore
- Years active: 2010–present
- Labels: Nuclear Blast/Bloodblast (current); Out of Line; Trisol; Standby
- Website: daveysuicide.tumblr.com/bio

Davey Suicide is an American rock singer and the name of his band. They are based in Hollywood, California. The group, formed in 2010, is known for their personas, avant-garde lyrics, stage antics, and big rock anthems.

Davey Suicide's first recordings gained attention from Century Media, Standby Records, and Rob McDermott (former Linkin Park manager) after playing Chain Reaction in October 2011. Davey Suicide signed a recording contract with Standby Records in 2012 and was recognized on Alternative Press's list of "100 Bands You Need to know", Kerrang Magazine's "50 Greatest Rockstars in the World", Big Cheese "Introducing", and Revolver Magazine's "Ones to Watch". Davey Suicide is currently signed to Out of Line Music.

== Musical style ==
Davey Suicide has been classified as a rock band with industrial and goth elements. Early band influences include Guns N' Roses, Pantera, Metallica, Marilyn Manson, Nine Inch Nails, and Eminem. Davey's favorite frontmen and lyricists are Axl Rose, Eminem, and Marilyn Manson, whom he has tattooed on his forearm.

== Legal issues ==
In 2016, Standby Records and Davey Suicide had a public and legal dispute. Suicide released an 11-minute video on Facebook detailing his experience with Standby Records and alleging that they sabotaged the band's career. The music community rallied behind Suicide, which forced the case into a settlement within the same week of the video's release. Suicide regained his master recordings for Put Our Trust in Suicide, Davey Suicide, and World Wide Suicide, as well as freedom from the label in exchange for the removal of the viral post.

== Made from Fire ==
In March 2017, Davey Suicide released Made from Fire (produced by Charles Kallaghan Massabo), the first album since the settlement. The album peaked at number 24 on the Billboard charts and outsold all of their previous releases on Standby Records.

== Band members ==
=== Current ===
- Davey Suicide – lead vocals (2010–present)
- Niko Gemini – guitars, backing vocals (2014–present)
- Derek Obscura – bass, backing vocals (2015–present)
- Marton Veress – drums (2019–present)

=== Former ===
- Eric Griffin – guitars (2012)
- Diego "Ashes" Ibarra – guitars (2013)
- Jared "Needlz" Farrell – keyboards (2011–2016)
- Frankie Sil – bass (2011–2013)
- Brent Ashley – bass, backing vocals (2013–2014)
- Ben Graves – drums (2011–2012)
- Drayven Davidson – drums (2013–2018)
- James Decker – drums (2018)

== Discography ==
- Put Our Trust in Suicide (EP) – November 6, 2012
- Davey Suicide – March 19, 2013
- World Wide Suicide – September 30, 2014
- Made from Fire – March 24, 2017
- Rock Aint Dead – January 24, 2020

Singles

- "Generation Fuck Star" – May 1, 2012
- "Rise Above" – August 26, 2016
- One of My Kind – November 30, 2018 (single)
- "Medicate Me" (feat. Telle Smith of The Word Alive) – September 20, 2019
- "Rock Aint Dead" – October 25, 2019
- "Animal" – January 24, 2020
- "I'm Afraid of Americans" – June 11, 2021
