= List of songs recorded by Farewell, My Love =

The following is a list of recorded songs by the American rock band Farewell, My Love.

| Song title | Year | Album | Length | Notes |
|---|---|---|---|---|
| "Above it All" | 2016 | Above it All | 4:13 | |
| "A Dance You Won't Forget" | 2011 | A Dance You Won't Forget (EP) | 3:25 | |
| "Afraid of the Dark" | 2013 | Gold Tattoos | 3:55 | |
| "All Night" | 2018 | Farewell, My Love (EP) | 3:47 | |
| "Angels" | 2013 | Gold Tattoos | 3:26 | |
| "Burn out the Night" | 2016 | Above it All | 3:18 | |
| "Catch Your Breath" | 2018 | Farewell, My Love (EP) | 3:01 | |
| "Crazy" | 2016 | Above it All | 3:06 | |
| "Don't Wait for Me" | 2016 | Above it All | 4:19 | |
| "Faceless Frames" | 2013 | Gold Tattoos | 4:40 | |
| "The Glamour" | 2011 | A Dance You Won't Forget (EP) | 3:34 | |
| "Gold Tattoos" | 2013 | Gold Tattoos | 3:47 | |
| "The Hardest Heart" | 2013 | A Dance You Won't Forget (EP) | 3:32 | |
| "Help Me Out" | 2018 | Farewell, My Love (EP) | 4:20 | |
| "Hit or Miss" | 2016 | Above it All | 3:52 | |
| "Inside a Nightmare" | 2016 | Above it All | 3:37 | |
| "It's My Life" | 2013 | Mirror, Mirror (EP) | 3:27 | Cover of Bon Jovi's "It's My Life" |
| "Just Another Soul" | 2011 | A Dance You Won't Forget (EP) | 3:59 | |
| "Just Another Soul (Acoustic)" | 2013 | Mirror, Mirror (EP) | 4:03 | |
| "Last Goodbye" | 2016 | Above it All | 2:27 | |
| "Make Believe" | 2016 | Above it All | 3:56 | |
| "Maybe I" | 2016 | Above it All | 4:06 | |
| "Mirror, Mirror" | 2013 | Mirror, Mirror (EP) & Gold Tattoos | 3:00 | |
| "Never Stop" | 2016 | Above it All | 3:31 | |
| "New Scenario" | 2018 | Farewell, My Love (EP) | 4:20 | |
| "Nostalgia" | 2013 | Gold Tattoos | 0:50 | |
| "Paper Forts" | 2013 | Gold Tattoos | 4:28 | |
| "Portraits" | 2011 | A Dance You Won't Forget (EP) | 3:02 | |
| "The Queen of Hearts" | 2013 | Gold Tattoos | 4:31 | |
| "Rewind the Play" | 2013 | Gold Tattoos | 4:50 | |
| "Skip the Memories" | 2013 | Mirror, Mirror (EP) & Gold Tattoos | 3:15 | |
| "Skip the Memories II" | 2016 | Above it All | 4:03 | |
| "Victory" | 2018 | Farewell, My Love (EP) | 3:29 | |
| "Welcome to the Beginning" | 2016 | Above it All | 1:39 | |
| "Who Are You?" | 2016 | Above it All | 4:20 | |
| "Wrong & Right" | 2011 | A Dance You Won't Forget (EP) | 2:58 | |
| "Skip the Memories (Acoustic)" | 2014 | Wrapped Up In Pinstripes | 3:27 | |
| "My Perfect Thing (Acoustic)" | 2014 | Wrapped Up In Pinstripes | 4:12 | |
| "Portraits (Acoustic)" | 2014 | Wrapped Up In Pinstripes | 2:56 | |
| "Gold Tattoos (Acoustic)" | 2014 | Wrapped Up In Pinstripes | 3:59 | |
| "Paper Forts (Acoustic)" | 2014 | Wrapped Up In Pinstripes | 4:45 | |
