= AM PM =

AM PM may refer to:

- ampm, a convenience store chain
- AM/PM (album), the debut studio album by American post-hardcore band The White Noise, released June 23, 2017
- AM PM (Dufresne album), the third album by Italian post-hardcore band Dufresne, released May 14, 2010
- AM:PM, the debut extended play by Indonesian singer-songwriter Stephanie Poetri, released March 12, 2021
- AM PM (Endorphin album), the third album by the Australian band Endorphin, released in 2002
- AM PM Records, the former dance division of A&M Records in Britain

== See also ==
- 12-hour clock
