= Malevolence (New Years Day album) =

Studio album by New Years Day
- Released: October 2, 2015
- Recorded: Grey Area Studios, North Hollywood, CA
- Genre: Alternative metal; nu metal
- Length: 42:14
- Label: Another Century
- Producer: Erik Ron

New Years Day chronology
Epidemic (2014)	Malevolence (2015)	Unbreakable (2019)

Singles from Malevolence
- 1. "Defame Me" Released: November 17, 2014; 2. "Kill or Be Killed" Released: June 26, 2015; 3. "Malevolence" Released: October 12, 2015; 4. "I'm About to Break You" Released: February 17, 2016

Malevolence is the third full-length album by American rock band New Years Day, released on October 2, 2015, through Another Century Records. The album debuted at No. 8 on Billboard's Top Rock Albums chart, selling 19,000 copies in its first week.

On August 11, 2015, the band announced their first headlining tour in support of the album, "The Other Side Tour" with opening acts Eyes Set to Kill, Get Scared, and New Volume. Before the tour started, New Volume dropped off, while The Relapse Symphony and Darksiderz were added to the bill.

Professional ratings
Review scores
Source	Rating
Alternative Press	Positive
MOSH (Hit the Floor Magazine)	8/10
New Noise Magazine	4/5 stars
Revival Media	8/10
Ghost Cult Magazine	7.5/10

== Background ==
Speaking about the album, vocalist Ash Costello said, "Malevolence is the most personal album we have ever written to date. More than ever you can really feel the blood and tears in these lyrics. It wasn't an easy process because it was so emotional but what came from it is honest and real. It's therapeutic and angry but still shows vulnerability.

"Our producer Erik Ron will always start an album by asking me 'what are you feeling right now?" to which I replied 'pissed off.' I think anyone that has suffered through loss, betrayal, insecurity and abandonment will absolutely relate to it. For me, it felt so good to get everything I had been bottling up out and hopefully it helps others in the process."

The song "Defame Me" from the Epidemic EP appears on the CD.

== Release ==
The album's first single "Kill or Be Killed" was debuted while the band was on Warped Tour 2015. Pre-orders became available at the band's merchandise tent the same day the single was officially released.

== Track listing ==
All songs written by Ashley Costello, Erik Ron & Anthony Barro

No.	Title	Length
1.	"Kill or Be Killed"	3:52
2.	"I'm About to Break You"	3:20
3.	"Alone"	3:24
4.	"Left Inside"	3:11
5.	"Relentless"	3:09
6.	"Save Myself from Me"	3:19
7.	"Suffer"	3:50
8.	"Anthem of the Unwanted"	3:30
9.	"Scream"	3:27
10.	"Your Ghost"	3:34
11.	"Defame Me"	3:18
12.	"Malevolence"	4:15
Total length:		42:14

== Personnel ==
Band

- Ash Costello - vocals
- Nikki Misery - lead guitar
- Jeremy Valentyne - rhythm guitar, backing vocals
- Nick Rossi - drums

Production

- Erik Ron - producer, mixer
- Sterling Sound - mastering
- Modivz - artwork

== Charts ==
Chart (2015)	Peak position
US Billboard 200	45
