= The C.I.P. =

Italian electronic duo band

The C.I.P
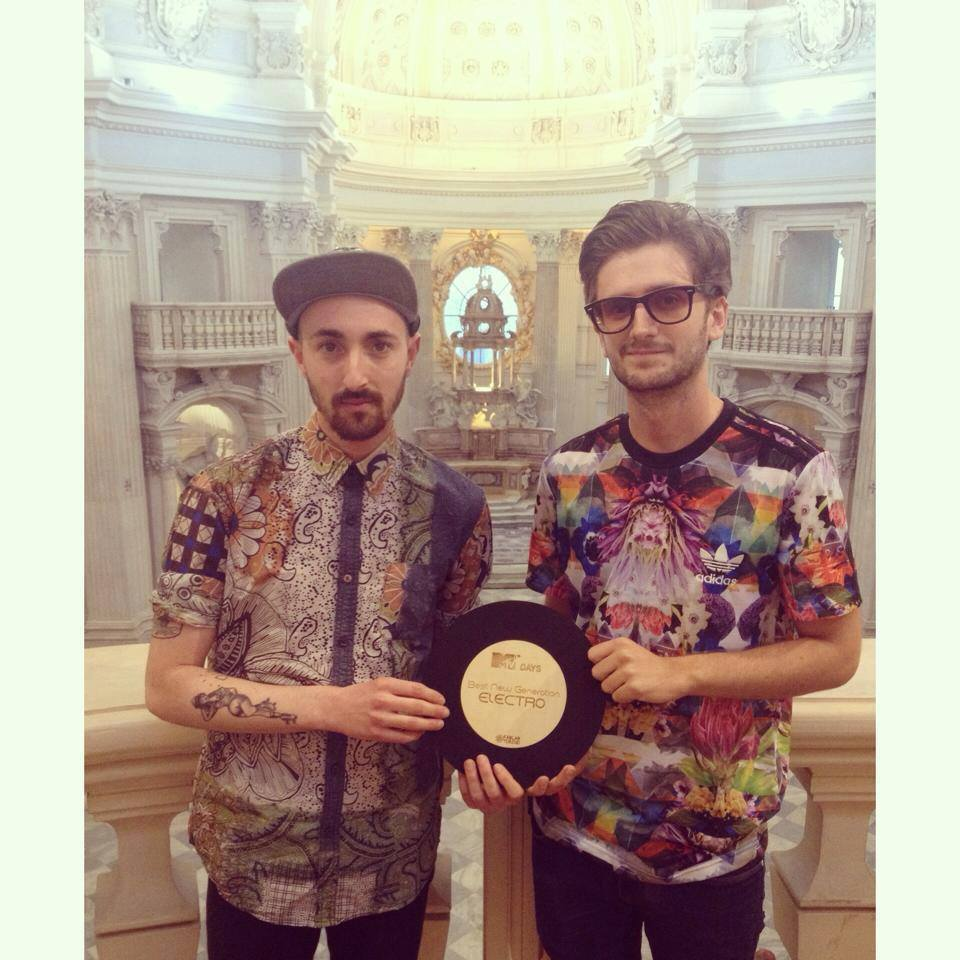

Background information
- Origin: Italy
- Genres: Electropop
- Years active: 2013–present
- Label: Volcan Records
- Members: Michele Scheveger; Simone Cavalli
- Website: http://thecipmusic.com

The C.I.P. is an electronic duo band formed in late 2013 in Italy. The group consists of Michele Scheveger (lead vocals and additional synthesizer) and Simone Cavalli (synthesizer and samplers).

== History ==
=== Beginnings ===
The C.I.P. is a musical duo formed in Rome, in September 2013 by Michele Scheveger and Simone Cavalli. After completing their schooling, Scheveger and Cavalli began writing songs together in Cavalli's garage. They practiced in studios, wrote music collaboratively, attended electronic music shows, and performed at house parties. Initially, the duo used various names before formally registering the band name "The C.I.P."

=== Daydream and "We'll Set The World On Fire" ===
The C.I.P.'s first performance was at a local Halloween festival. The duo gained recognition in Rome's music scene and met Antonio Filippelli, a former member of Vanilla Sky, who became their producer. With Filippelli, they recorded their debut album, "Daydream," which was released in June 2014 by Volcan Records. The album was recorded in Tuscany during the summer of 2013 and released after over a year of production. "Daydream" reached the number one position on the iTunes Electronic chart in italy and the number 52 spot on the iTunes general chart.

The music video for the first single, "We’ll Set The World On Fire," was previewed by Rockit on June 23, 2014, and received over 30,000 views.

=== Collaboration with MTV ===
The C.I.P was nominated "Artist of the Week” by MTV New Generation (MTV Italy) on the June 30th, 2014, was invited to perform at the MTV Digital Days in Turin on the September 13th, 2014. During the event, the band won the Best New Generation Electro MTV Music Award and was nominated “Artist of the Month” by MTV. The C.I.P appeared on Rolling Stone Magazine (Italy) in January 2017.

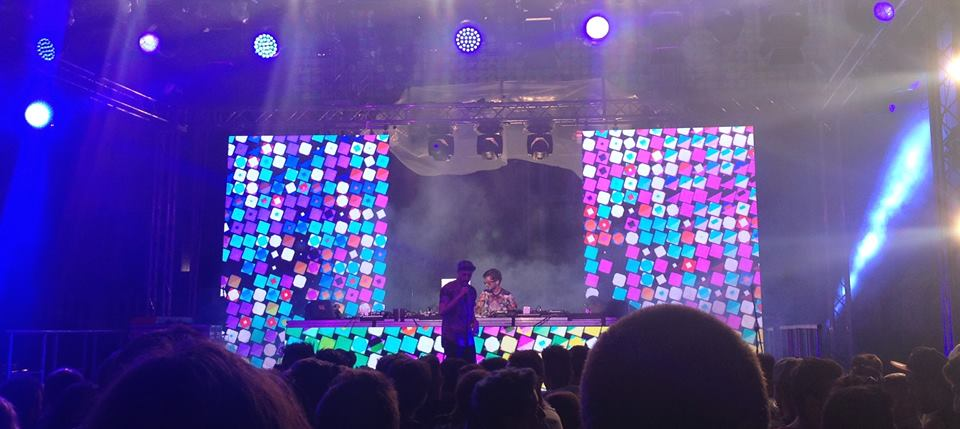
The C.I.P performing at the MTV Digital Days

== Discography ==
Album title	Released	Label	Format	Peak chart positions (iTunes)
Daydream	June 9, 2014	Volcan Records	digital download	#1 Electronic; #52 General

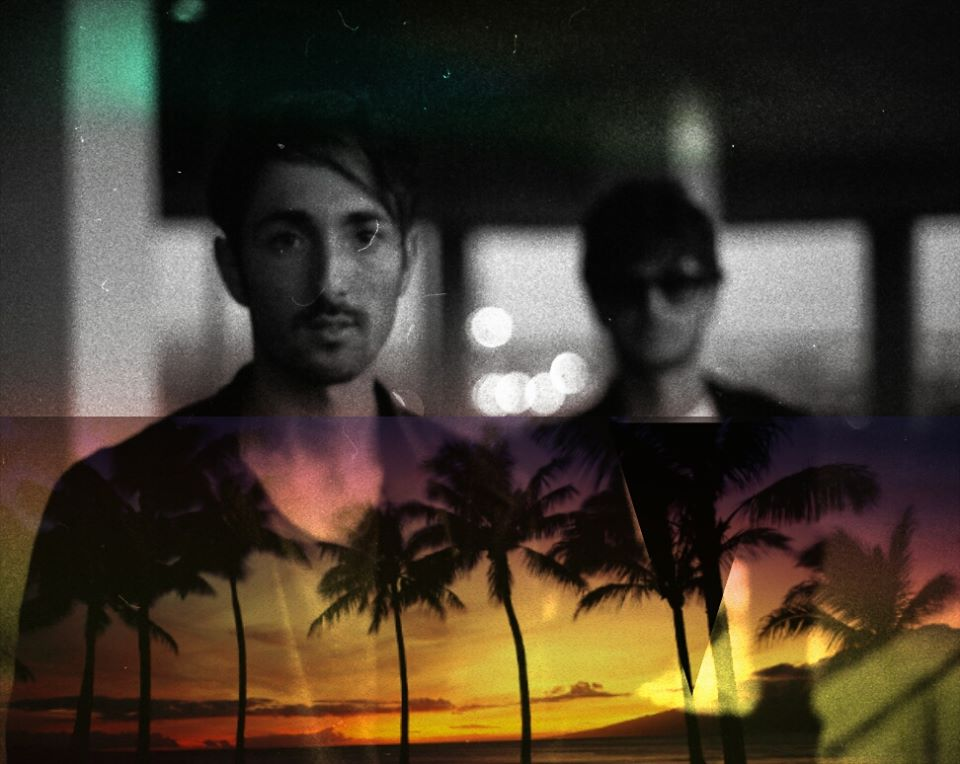
The C.I.P

== Members ==
- Michele Scheveger - lead vocals
- Simone Cavalli - synthesizer and samplers
