= Six Years Home =

Studio album by Hopes Die Last
- Released: August 4, 2009
- Recorded: 2009, at The Antimatter Studio, Winston-Salem, North Carolina
- Genre: Post-hardcore
- Length: 35:11
- Label: StandBy
- Producer: Daniele Brian Autore

Hopes Die Last chronology
Your Face Down Now (2007)	Six Years Home (2009)	Trust No One (2012)

Singles from Six Years Home
- 1. "Some Like It Cold" Released: November 9, 2009; 2. "Johnny's Light Sucks" Released: October 26, 2011

Six Years Home is the debut studio album by Italian post-hardcore band Hopes Die Last. It was released on August 4, 2009, through Standby Records. It includes a re-recorded version of "Call Me Sick Boy" from their EP Your Face Down Now, and nine other tracks.

== Track listing ==
No.	Title	Length
1.	"Some Like It Cold"	4:01
2.	"Ever The Same, And Always Will Be"	3:38
3.	"Call Me Sick Boy"	3:41
4.	"An Endless Serenade"	1:43
5.	"Under This Red Sky"	4:17
6.	"Good Mourning, Honey"	3:38
7.	"Consider Me Alive"	3:24
8.	"Stuck Inside My Head"	3:37
9.	"Johnny's Light Sucks"	4:10
10.	"Six Years Home"	4:22
Total length:		35:11

== Personnel ==
Six Year Home album personnel as listed on Allmusic.

Hopes Die Last

- Daniele Tofani - unclean vocals
- Marco Mantovani - lead guitar, backing vocals
- Luigi Magliocca - rhythm guitar
- Marco "Becko" Calanca - bass, clean vocals, keyboard, programming
- Ivan Panella - drums, percussion

Composers

- Daniele Tofani - composer on Consider Me Alive
- Marco Mantovani - composer on all songs except Consider Me Alive
- Jacopo Iannariello - composer on Good Mourning, Honey (Former guitarist, 2004–2008)

Production

- Produced, mixed, additional keyboard, programming & vocals by Daniele Brian Autore
- Engineered & mastered by Vincenzo Mario Cristi
