= Unbreakable (New Years Day album) =

Studio album by New Years Day
- Released: April 26, 2019
- Genre: Alternative metal; nu metal; gothic metal
- Length: 42:55
- Label: Another Century

New Years Day chronology
Malevolence (2015)	Unbreakable (2019)	Half Black Heart (2024)

Singles from Unbreakable
- 1. "Skeletons" Released: November 9, 2018; 2. "Shut Up" Released: March 1, 2019; 3. "Come for Me" Released: September 3, 2019

Unbreakable is the fourth full-length album by American rock band New Years Day, released on April 26, 2019, through Century Media Records. Loudwire named it one of the 50 best rock albums of 2019.

Professional ratings
Review scores
Source	Rating
Distorted Sound Magazine	8/10
Kerrang!	3/5 stars
Wall of Sound Australia	5.5/10

== Track listing ==
No.	Title	Length
1.	"Come for Me"	3:34
2.	"MissUnderstood"	3:15
3.	"Skeletons"	3:32
4.	"Unbreakable"	4:10
5.	"Shut Up"	3:31
6.	"Done with You"	3:27
7.	"Poltergeist"	3:46
8.	"Break My Body"	3:03
9.	"Sorry Not Sorry"	4:18
10.	"My Monsters"	3:34
11.	"Nocturnal"	3:30
12.	"I Survived"	3:15
Total length:		42:55
