= Victim to Villain =

Studio album by New Years Day
- Released: June 11, 2013
- Length: 34:52
- Label: Century Media
- Producer: Erik Ron

New Years Day chronology
My Dear (2007)	Victim to Villain (2013)	Epidemic (2014)

Singles from Victim To Villain
- 1. "Do Your Worst" Released: January 3, 2013; 2. "I'm No Good" Released: May 6, 2013; 3. "Death of the Party" Released: June 27, 2013; 4. "Angel Eyes" Released: August 14, 2013

Victim to Villain is the second full-length album by American rock band New Years Day, released on June 11, 2013, through Century Media Records, their first and only for the label. This is the first official full-length from New Years Day in six years.

This album shows the band taking on a darker, heavier sound that began with the preceding EP, The Mechanical Heart. The first single from the album, "Do Your Worst" was released in January 2013 with a lyric video featuring Ashley in a grave, followed by "I'm No Good" on May 6, 2013, also with a lyric video with scenes of all the band members. "Death of The Party" was released as the third single with a lyric video and "Angel Eyes" was released as the fourth and final single of the album with an accompanying music video.

The album was rated a five out of five by Cryptic Rock.

== Track listing ==
All songs written by New Years Day and Erik Ron, except where noted

1. "Do Your Worst" - 3:16
2. "I'm No Good" - 3:45
3. "Bloody Mary" - 3:13
4. "Victims" - 3:58
5. "Hello Darkness" - 3:21
6. "Death of the Party" - 3:14
7. "The Arsonist" (New Years Day, Erik Ron and Jason Evigan) - 3:24
8. "Angel Eyes" (feat. Chris Motionless)(New Years Day, Erik Ron and Joel Faviere) - 2:57
9. "Any Last Words?" - 2:50
10. "Tombstone" - 1:45
11. "Last Great Love Story" - 3:17

== Personnel ==
- Ash Costello - lead vocals
- Nikki Misery - lead guitar
- Jake Jones - rhythm guitar
- Anthony Barro - bass, backing vocals
- Russell Dixon - drums

Additional Personnel

- Chris Motionless - guest vocals on "Angel Eyes"

== Album information ==
- Produced, recorded, and mixed by Erik Ron
- Recorded at Grey Area Studios, North Hollywood, CA
- Engineered by Adrian Alvarado
- Mastered by Alan Douches at West West Side Music, New Windsor, NY
