= Digger (band) =

American pop punk band

- Origin: Lehigh Valley, Pennsylvania, United States
- Genre: Pop punk
- Years active: 1995–2004, 2015-present
- Label: Hopeless Records
- Members: Chris Benner, Matthew Gregorec, Ryan Keller, Ben Stephens, Tommy Cobb
- Past members: Joel Heidecker, Phil Nelson, Jeff Kish, Mike Kelly, Garrett Hoskins

Digger is an American pop punk band from Pennsylvania, signed to Hopeless Records.

== History ==
Digger formed in the Lehigh Valley in the mid-1990s and signed to Hopeless Records in 1996. Upon the event of Digger's live recording being played on WMUH the word of the band spread quickly, which led to the band's sign to Hopeless Records. The band released their first LP, Powerbait, and toured until the band came back to the studio to record The Promise of an Uncertain Future. The band became a three piece in this era, and launched a world tour. Then Monte Carlo was released as a follow-up. Not very long afterward, Digger released the Trainwreck EP. Then after another member change, Digger released what would be their last full album, Keystone. The departure of the group's bassist and guitarist resulted in their canceling their tour to support the album. After replacing the members, the group continued touring and recording up until the summer of 2004, when they disbanded.

Three of five songs of the final recording of Digger have been posted on purevolume.com for free download. This final EP is entitled Seaside Diner.

In October 2015, original members Matthew Gregorec and Chris Benner decided to reform with Gregorec taking over second guitar responsibilities, Ben Stephens replacing Gregorec on the bass, and Ryan Keller joining the pop-punk veterans on the drums.

== Members ==
Founding members

- Chris Benner - guitar, vocals (1995–Present)
- Matthew Gregorec - vocals, bass, guitar (1995–Present)
- Mike "Maniac" Fisher - drums (1995–1998)
- Phil Nelson - vocals, guitar (1995–1997) (Deceased)

Later members

- Jeff Kish - guitar, vocals (1997-1999)
- Mark Kale - guitar (1999-2000)
- Mike Bowen - drums (1999-2000)
- Ben Stephens - bass (2000–Present)
- Mike Kelly - drums (2001–2004)
- Warren Cooke - bass (2003–2004)
- Tim Wright - guitar (2003–2004)
- Jay Thomas - bass (2004)
- Ryan Keller - drums (2015–Present)
- Joel Heidecker - guitar (1997-1999)
- Tommy Cobb - bass (2018–Present)

== Discography ==
- Powerbait (Hopeless Records, 1996)
- The Promise of an Uncertain Future (Hopeless, 1998)
- Monte Carlo (Hopeless, 2000)
- Trainwreck EP (Hopeless, 2001)
- Keystone (Hopeless, 2002)
- Tattoo Broken Hearts EP (Wynona Records, 2003)
- Seaside Diner EP (Not released on label, 2004)
