= My Dear =

Studio album by New Years Day
- Released: May 8, 2007
- Recorded: 2006–2007
- Length: 36:24
- Label: TVT
- Producer: Eugene Pererras, Adam Lohrbach, New Years Day

New Years Day chronology
New Years Day (2006)	My Dear (2007)	Victim to Villain (2013)

Singles from My Dear
- 1. "Ready Aim Misfire" Released: 2006; 2. "I Was Right" Released: 2007

Professional ratings
Review scores
Source	Rating
Allmusic	link

My Dear is the debut album by American rock band New Years Day, released in 2007 by TVT Records. The album was self-financed, self-produced, and recorded over an eight-month period at the home of producer Eugene Pererras. The band's debut music video for the lead single "I Was Right" won an MTVU "Freshman Face" poll and was added to the channel's playlist.

The album includes contributions from John Christianson and Dan Regan of Reel Big Fish, who provide horns on "My Sweet Unvalentine." "Brilliant Lies" includes lyrics written by Justin Pierre of Motion City Soundtrack.

== Track listing ==
All songs written by Adam Lohrbach, except where noted.

1. "I Was Right" - 3:01
2. "Ready Aim Misfire" - 3:21
3. "My Dear" - 3:48
4. "Part Time Lover" - 2:53
5. "Sunrise Sunset" - 2:59
6. "My Sweet Unvalentine" - 3:24
7. "You'll Only Make It Worse" - 3:36
8. "Brilliant Lies" (Guy Erez, Emerson Swinford, Ashley Costello, Justin Pierre, Eugene Pererras) - 3:50
9. "Temecula Sunrise" - 3:45
10. "Razor" - 2:51
11. "Saying Goodbye" - 3:47
12. "Let's Toast" (iTunes-only bonus track)

== Performers ==
- Ashley Costello - lead vocals
- Keith Drover - rhythm guitar, keyboards, backing vocals
- Mike Schoolden - lead guitar, backing vocals
- Adam Lohrbach - bass, backing vocals
- Russell Dixon - drums

Additional Performers:

- John Christianson - trumpet on "My Sweet Unvalentine"
- Dan Regan - trombone on "My Sweet Unvalentine"
- John Urban - upright bass on "My Sweet Unvalentine"
- Eugene Perreras, Lindsey Christopher, and April Agostini - backing vocals

== Album information ==
- Record label: TVT Records
- Produced by Eugene Pererras, Adam Lohrbach, and New Year's Day
- Recorded at Eugenious Studios
- Additional recording at Hard Drive Studios in North Hollywood, California
- Additional engineering by Doug Messenger, Ryan Baker, Adam Lohrbach, Mike Schoolden, and Russell Dixon
- Mixed by Paul David Hagar at Encore Studios in Burbank, California
- Mastered by George Marino at Sterling Sound in New York, New York
- All songs written by Adam Lohrbach and New Year's Day except "Brilliant Lies" by Guy Erez, Emerson Swinford, Ashley Costello, Justin Pierre, and Eugene Pererras.
- Strings and orchestral arrangements by Mike Schoolden
- Programming and electronics by Keith Drover and Justin Fowler
- A&R - Leonard B. Johnson
