= AM PM (Dufresne album) =

AM:PM

Studio album by Dufresne
- Released: May 14, 2010
- Recorded: Raptor Recording Studio, Vicenza, Italy
- Genres: Post-hardcore, screamo, alternative rock
- Length: 35:05
- Label: Wynona Records
- Producer: Matt Hyde

Dufresne chronology
Lovers (2008)	AM:PM (2010)

AM:PM is the third album by Italian post-hardcore band Dufresne. It was released May 14, 2010.

The album was recorded in Vicenza, Italy at Raptor Recording Studio, owned by bassist Matteo "Ciube" Tabacco, and produced by British producer Matt Hyde.

== Track listing ==
No.	Title	Length
1.	"Keep This Party Going"	3:00
2.	"Hi, Society"	3:53
3.	"Bagliori nel buio"	4:05
4.	"While the City Sleeps"	3:48
5.	"AM"	0:58
6.	"Omega"	2:00
7.	"Horizon"	2:43
8.	"Galaxy"	3:48
9.	"Hourglass"	2:44
10.	"PM"	1:11
11.	"L'ultimo sole"	3:16
12.	"Midnight"	3:45
Total length:		35:05

== Personnel ==
- Nicola "Dominik" Cerantola - lead vocals
- Matteo "Ciube" Tabacco - bass, backup vocals
- Luca Dal Lago - guitar
- Alessandro Costa - keyboards
- Davide Zenorini - drums
