= Settle the Sky =

Settle The Sky
- Origin: Fremont, Ohio
- Genres: Metalcore; Christian hardcore; post-hardcore
- Years active: 2006-2010, 2016-2018, 2020-present
- Labels: StandBy Records, Independent
- Website: Settle the Sky on Facebook

Settle The Sky is an American metalcore band. The band has had members that have gone on to play with Blessthefall, Before Their Eyes, Grubby Paws, Affairs, Glasslands, Convictions, and Glaslungs.

== Background ==
Settle the Sky formed in Ohio in 2005. In 2007, the band recorded with Joey Sturgis and released their EP, Now That We're Waiting in 2008 on StandBy Records. The band toured with Vanna in 2008, and The Crimson Armada as well as I Am Abomination in 2009. The band disbanded in 2010, and members went on to join Before Their Eyes, Convictions, Glasslands, Affairs, Glaslungs & Legacy. The band was openly Christian, but in more recent days, certain members have lost their faith. The band reunited in 2016 & played a show in Ohio on February 17, 2017. The band has announced that after much discussion, they will be putting the band to rest after all this time, and writing under a new name TBA.

On June 7, 2017, they released a brand new single released independently titled "A New Way".

On June 15, 2020, the band announced on their Facebook page that they are "not dead" and are heading into the studio Saturday, June 20.

The band released a new single on July 17, 2020, titled "Year of Ruin". Another single, "Linger", was released on December 4, 2020.

== Members ==
Current lineup

- JD Merrill - Vocals/Keyboard (2005-2010 2016-Now)
- Daniel Gardner - Vocals (2006-2010, 2017-Now) (ex-Convictions, ex-Legacy, & Truth Is)
- Michael Michener II - Bass (2006-2008, 2016-Now), Guitar (2005-2006, 2008-2009) (Walking Edith Park, ex-Affairs & Glaslungs)
- Ian Reiter - Guitar (2008-2010, 2016-Now) (Hence the Wolves & Holy Coast)
- Jeremiah Britner - Guitar (2006-2008, 2016–Now)
- Samuel Miller - Drums (2006-2007, 2020-Now)

Former members

- Ryan Myers - Bass (2005-2006, 2008-2010)
- Elliott Gruenberg - Guitar (2006-2008) (Blessthefall, ex-Before Their Eyes, ex-Legacy)
- Aaron Warner - Vocals (2005)
- Maverick Carnegie - Vocals (2009) (Walking Edith Park)
- Jordan DiSorbo - Guitar (2009-2010) (Before Their Eyes & Glasslands)
- David Rhoades - Drums (2010) (From the Shallows, Legacy)

== Discography ==
- Now That We're Waiting (2008; EP)
- Demo 2010 (2010)
- A New Way (2017) (Single)
- Year of Ruin (2020) (Single)
- Year of Ruin (2020; EP)
