= The Nearly Deads =

American rock band

- Origin: Nashville, Tennessee, U.S.
- Genres: Post-grunge, alternative rock
- Years active: 2010–2025
- Members: Theresa Jeane; Steven Tobi; Kevin Koelsch; Javier Garza Jr; Josh Perrone
- Past members: Brandon Barnes; Cory Walen
- Website: thenearlydeads.com

The Nearly Deads were an American alternative rock band from Nashville, Tennessee, formed in 2010. It consisted of Theresa Jeane, Steven Tobi, Javier Garza Jr., and Josh Perrone. Their self-titled debut EP, The Nearly Deads, was released in 2011. They signed with Standby Records in June 2013 to release their second EP, Survival Guide, on August 20 the same year. Their first full-length album, Invisible Tonight, was released in June 2014. In 2025, the band announced that they were disbanding.

== History ==
Working with producer Jon King, the band released their first EP, The Nearly Deads, in 2011 and the song Never Look Back in particular proved popular, with the song's official music video receiving over 6 million views since its release. The band gained further prominence, winning the Converse Battle of the Bands at the Journey's Backyard BBQ in Nashville, reaching No. 14 on the Billboard Next Big Sound Chart, and performing on the Kevin Says Stage at Warped Tour in July 2012.

In June 2013 The Nearly Deads announced they had signed with StandBy Records and that they were to release a second EP on August 20, 2013.

The band's rising popularity and recognition has seen them perform with Halestorm, All American Rejects, Tonight Alive, and Man Overboard, In This Moment, among others, and at events such as Summerfest, PrideFest (Milwaukee) and the Vans Warped Tour.

In April 2014, after parting company with StandBy Records, The Nearly Deads began a Kickstarter campaign to fund the release of their debut album Invisible Tonight, to be released on June 24, and subsequent tour, the campaign reached over $2200 of their $10000 goal within the first 24 hours alone, and reached the target in May. On March 5, 2025, the band announced through their social media that they were disbanding.

=== Formation ===
The band has its roots in Tampa, Florida. Theresa Jeane was in a local band called Blondes Not Bombs while a music major at University of South Florida, and became friends with Steve Tobi and Cory Walen, who were in another local band, DangerFlight, after they met through mutual friends. In an interview with TJ and Steven Tobi, TJ revealed that she went to see them play a show where they announced it was their last in Florida before moving to Nashville, making the move in May 2009, TJ decided she needed a change, and in August that year, they moved in together, however, the original lead singer of Tobi and Walen's band didn't relocate with them. After auditioning for new leads, they agreed that TJ would become their new lead singer and they became The Nearly Deads in January 2010. In the same interview TJ states that they found their bass player, Kevin Koelsch, on Craigslist.

The band's name pays homage to their Florida past, coming from a saying that Florida is "home of the newlyweds and the nearly-deads".

== Musical style ==
The Nearly Deads music style is regarded as alternative rock, punk rock, grunge, and post-grunge. The band have described themselves as "My Chemical Romance meets the Foo Fighters, with Courtney Love at the helm, if she could wail like Kelly Clarkson". ReverbNation said of the band: "Nashville-based alternative rock outfit The Nearly Deads are primed and ready to explode. The band has created a buzz of their very own, mixing the polished pop vocals of singer Theresa Jeane with the aggressive grunge-inspired instrumentals of Steve Tobi, Javier Garza, Josh Perrone, and Kevin Koelsch. The Nearly Deads have managed to create a truly unique genre that not only gives a nod to gritty grunge, but brings it back in a way never heard before. Imagine Kelly Clarkson as front-woman of the Foo Fighters." Similarities to My Chemical Romance have been mentioned and reviews have also noted the passion of each band member and Theresa Jeane's powerful vocal presence and Fridae Mattas called them a band with "that unique potential you rarely find".

== Members ==
- "TJ" Theresa Jeane – vocals, keyboards
- Steven Tobi – lead guitar, bass
- Javier Garza Jr. – rhythm guitar
- Josh Perrone – drums

== Discography ==
=== Studio albums ===
Year	Album
2014	Invisible Tonight: Release date: June 24, 2014; Label: -
2023	We Are the Nearly Deads: Release date: July 7, 2023; Label: -

=== EPs ===
- The Nearly Deads (2011)
- Survival Guide (2013)
- Revenge of the Nearly Deads (2017)

=== Singles ===
- "I Said" (2014)
- "Holding on for Life" (2016)
- "You Got Me (Reanimated)" (2018)
- "Freakshow" (2018)
- "Halfway to Nowhere" (2019)
- "Watch Your Back" (2019)
- "Can't Make You Change" (2020)

=== Music videos ===
Year	Title	Album
2011	"Never Look Back"	"The Nearly Deads – EP"
2011	"Fact and Friction"	"The Nearly Deads – EP"
2013	"Brave"	"Survival Guide – EP"
2014	"I Said"	"Invisible Tonight"
2014	"Our Last Adventure"	"Invisible Tonight"
2016	"Holding On for Life"	"Holding On for Life – Single
2016	"Punk Rock Kitty Cat"	"Punk Rock Kitty Cat – Single"
2016	"My Evil Ways"	"Revenge of the Nearly Deads – EP"
2017	"Diamond in the Rough"	"Revenge of the Nearly Deads – EP"
2017	"Frequencies"	"Revenge of the Nearly Deads – EP"
