= Lovers (Dufresne album) =

Studio album by Dufresne
- Released: April 11, 2008
- Recorded: Red Planet Studios, Richmond, Virginia
- Genres: Post-hardcore, screamo
- Length: 44:45
- Label: Universal/V2
- Producer: Andreas Magnusson

Dufresne chronology
Atlantic (2006)	Lovers (2008)	AM:PM (2010)

Lovers is the second album by Italian post-hardcore band Dufresne. It was released April 11, 2008.

The album was recorded in October, 2007 in Richmond, Virginia at Red Planet Studios, produced by Andreas Magnusson.

== Track listing ==
No.	Title	Length
1.	"The Great Position"	2:58
2.	"Alibi Party"	3:54
3.	"Caffeine"	4:14
4.	"Il grande freddo"	3:38
5.	"We Are Equally Damaged"	3:21
6.	"O'er"	5:15
7.	"Life You Want"	3:47
8.	"Weddell"	3:07
9.	"Mina"	3:04
10.	"Oltre la pioggia"	3:56
11.	"Human After All"	3:44
12.	"Relation' Sheep"	3:55
Total length:		44:45

== Personnel ==
- Nicola "Dominik" Cerantola - lead vocals
- Matteo "Ciube" Tabacco - bass, backup vocals
- Luca Dal Lago - guitar
- Alessandro Costa - keyboards
- Davide Zenorini - drums
