= Hopes Die Last =

Italian post-hardcore band

- Origin: Rome, Italy
- Genres: Post-hardcore; metalcore
- Years active: 2004–2017; 2022–present
- Labels: StandBy; Wynona; Still Life
- Members: Marco "Becko" Calanca; Jacopo Omar Iannariello; Marco Mantovani; Ivan Panella; Daniele Tofani
- Past members: Yuri Santurri; Danilo Menna; Valerio "Nekso" Corsi; Luigi Magliocca; Nicolò Arquilla

Hopes Die Last is an Italian post-hardcore band from Rome, formed in 2004. Previously signed to StandBy Records, the band has self-released their latest EP. At the time of their breakup the line-up consisted of Daniele Tofani (lead vocals), Marco Mantovani (guitar/backing vocals) and Luigi Magliocca (guitar). To date, the band has released two studio albums and three EPs.

On January 6, 2017, Hopes Die Last announced their breakup. The remaining band members, except Luigi Magliocca, formed a new band entitled ALPHAWOLVES.

The band regrouped with its original lineup in February 2022.

== History ==
=== 2005-09: Early years and EPs ===
The band formed in 2004 from Ladispoli near Rome, as a group of teenage friends. The band played shows in Rome and, after, in the whole of Italy. Hopes Die Last released Aim For Tomorrow in 2005, which contains 8 songs. Aim For Tomorrow had their original line-up but, instead of "Becko" singing, it was Marco Mantovani who sang at the time and of course with Nicolò "Nick" with some singing and screaming.

In 2008, they were able to break into the emocore scene with the release of the EP Your Face Down Now. Thanks to their new album, the band played in Germany, England, France, USA and Japan. The EP is considered the most influenced by emo sound work of the band and contains six songs and an acoustic bonus track for Japan. One of tracks ("Call Me Sick Boy") is still one of the most popular songs of the band and was re-recorded for Hopes Die Last's next album. The EP is the first record by Hopes Die Last to include Marco "Becko" Calanca for the singing vocals but also the last to include former screaming vocalist Nick.

The band signed with StandBy Records in order to release the next work (Six Years Home) as a major record release, after being signed to Wynona Records, an Italian record company that mainly produces post-hardcore records.

=== 2009-11: Departure of Nick and Six Years Home ===
After their tour in United States and some dates in Europe, Nick (former screaming vocalist) decided to leave the band. He posted on Hopes Die Last Myspace page the following message : "Ehy guys what’s up? this is Nick… after months thinking about it, I just realized I didn’t want to be the singer/screamer of Hopes Die Last anymore so here I am, to tell you I left the band. I still love the other guys in the band and we’re still friends like before. I’m leaving the band just because I’m not happy to play this kind of music anymore. I’m sorry. Keep on supporting Hopes Die Last. I’ll be back with a new project in some months so don’t forget about me - Nick". After being the screamer for some months for the post-hardcore band Helia, in 2011 he started producing electronic music under the name of "Razihel".

In August 2009, the band released the first full-length album, called Six Years Home.

In 2010, the band was in a Tour for Italy and other European countries. The cover of the Katy Perry's song, Firework was released on March 3, 2011, on MySpace. and was featured on the band's second album.

=== 2011-12: Trust No One ===
Hopes Die Last are recording a new album coming out in 2012. In October, the band leaves for the UK tour with Attack Attack!, then proceed with further dates in Europe, East Europe and Russia. On November 14, 2011, exactly 3 months prior, Standby Records posted a song trailer for the upcoming single/video for a new song and revealed the album title. The singles Unleash Hell and Never Trust the Hazel Eyed were released in January 2012, followed in few months by the third single Keep Your Hands Off. The new album was finally announced with the name Trust No One and was released on February 14, 2012.

=== 2013: Wolfpack EP ===
On April 23, 2013, the band announced that Nekso is now a full member of the band. Nekso had already collaborated with the band on the song "Keep Your Hands Off", and also appeared on the music video of this song. On May 1, 2013, the band announced that they were now part of the Monster Energy family. On May 20, 2013, the band announced a new release for June 25, 2013, titled Wolfpack (EP) along with the release of a new single titled "Cheaters Must Die". The second single of Wolfpack (EP) is titled "Hellbound" and was released on June 3, 2013. Wolfpack (EP) was released on June 25, 2013. The digital version is available on media stores, and physical only on the band's store at shopbenchmack.com. On June 26, 2013, following the release of the EP, Hopes Die Last posted a third music video titled "Promises - Nero Cover". On December 3, 2013, the band posted a fourth music video for the song "The Wolfpack" which doesn't feature Valerio "Nekso" Corsi, suggesting he is not longer part of the band. Almost one year after the release of "The Wolfpack" music video, Hopes Die Last released a fifth music video for the song "Blackhearted".

=== 2015: Lineup changes and Alpha Wolves ===
On April 19, 2015, the band posted a teaser on YouTube to announce their coming back. This teaser was followed by a second one on April 29, 2015, where the name Alpha Wolves was shown for the first time. The band kept teasing on the social media and then confirmed the news on May 24, 2015, by announcing the release of their upcoming single entitled Alpha Wolves on June 3, 2015. This news was shortly followed by a Facebook post on May 28, 2015, stating that Marco "Becko" Calanca and Ivan Panella decided to part ways with Hopes Die Last, to dedicate themselves to new projects. the post also introduced new bassist Yuri Santurri and new drummer Danilo Menna. Alpha Wolves was released on iTunes on June 3, 2015, and was followed by a music video on YouTube.

=== 2017: Breakup and ALPHAWOLVES ===
On January 6, 2017, the band announced the end of the band on their Facebook account. The remaining band members, except guitarist Luigi Magliocca, formed a new band entitled ALPHAWOLVES. They released their debut single Bayonets on January 22, 2017.

=== 2022: Reunion ===
As of February 25, 2022, Hopes Die Last announced their reunion with the original band line-up. On March 4, 2022, a lyric video of the new single Silence Broken was released, followed by the music video of the same song on May 31, 2022. In the following months, the band released several singles, including Better Off Dead on April 25, 2022, White Eyes on June 28, 2022, and Dead Boy on September 2, 2022.

== Band members ==
Current lineup

- Marco Mantovani – guitar (2004–2017, 2022–present), clean vocals (2004–2006, 2015–2017)
- Jacopo Omar Iannariello – guitar (2004–2009, 2022–present)
- Marco "Becko" Calanca – bass, keyboards, clean vocals (2004–2015, 2022–present)
- Ivan Panella – drums (2004–2015, 2022–present)
- Daniele Tofani – unclean vocals (2009–2017, 2023–present), clean vocals (2015–2017)

Former members

- Valerio "Nekso" Corsi – keyboards, electronics (2013)
- Luigi Magliocca – guitar (2008–2017)
- Yuri Santurri – bass (2015–2017)
- Danilo Menna – drums, percussion (2015–2017)
- Nicolò Arquilla – lead vocals (2004–2009, 2022–2023)

Timeline

== Discography ==
Hopes Die Last discography
- Studio albums: 3
- Extended plays: 2
- Singles: 9

=== Albums & EPs ===
Date	Album	Label	Peak chart positions		
Date	Album	Label	US Heat	US Hard	US Indie
2005	Aim For Tomorrow	Self-released	—	—	—
2007	Your Face Down Now (EP)	Still Life / StandBy Records	—	—	—
2009	Six Years Home	StandBy Records	—	—	—
2012	Trust No One	StandBy Records	54	63	161
2013	Wolfpack (EP)	Self-released	—	—	—
2023	Once and For All	Self-released	—	—	—
"—" denotes a release that did not chart.

=== Singles ===
Year	Title	Album
2007	"Thanks for Coming (I Like You Dead)"	Your Face Down Now (EP)
2008	"Call Me Sick Boy"	Your Face Down Now (EP)
2009	"Some Like It Cold"	Six Years Home
2010	"Under the Red Sky"	Six Years Home
2011	"Johnny's Light Sucks"	Six Years Home
2011	"Unleash Hell"	Trust No One
2011	"Never Trust the Hazel Eyed"	Trust No One
2012	"Keep Your Hands Off"	Trust No One
2013	"Cheaters Must Die"	Wolfpack (EP)
2013	"Hellbound"	Wolfpack (EP)
2015	"Alpha Wolves"	—
2022	"Silence Broken"	—
2022	"Better Off Dead"	—
2022	"White Eyes"	—
2022	"Dead Boy"	—
2023	"Heartless"	—

== Music videos ==
Year	Title	Album
2007	"Thanks For Coming (I Like You Dead)"	Your Face Down Now (EP)
2007	"Call Me Sick Boy"	Your Face Down Now (EP)
2009	"Some Like It Cold"	Six Years Home
2011	"Johnny's Light Sucks"	Six Years Home
2011	"Unleash Hell"	Trust No One
2011	"Never Trust the Hazel Eyed"	Trust No One
2012	"Keep Your Hands Off"	Trust No One
2013	"Cheaters Must Die" (Lyric Video)	Wolfpack (EP)
2013	"Hellbound"	Wolfpack (EP)
2013	"Promises - Nero Cover" (Lyric Video)	Wolfpack (EP)
2013	"The Wolfpack"	Wolfpack (EP)
2014	"Blackhearted" (Lyric Video)	Wolfpack (EP)
2015	"Alpha Wolves"	—
2022	"Silence Broken (Lyric Video)"	—
2022	"Better Off Dead (Lyric Video)"	—
2022	"Silence Broken"	—
2022	"White Eyes"	—
2022	"Dead Boy"	—
