= Epidemic (EP) =

EP by New Years Day
- Released: November 18, 2014
- Recorded: 2014
- Length: 18:49
- Label: Grey Area
- Producer: Erik Ron

New Years Day chronology
Victim to Villain (2013)	Epidemic (2014)	Malevolence (2015)

Singles from Epidemic
- 1. "Other Side" Released: September 15, 2014; 2. "Epidemic" Released: November 10, 2014; 3. "Defame Me" Released: November 17, 2014

Epidemic is the third EP from American rock band New Years Day. It is their first and only release on the label Grey Area Records.

== Background ==
For the EP, lead vocalist Ash Costello said in an interview with Alternative Press, "We've taken what we have experienced in the past year and a half and poured it all into these new songs.... It’s something we know everyone can relate to it on their own level. The world can infect us with its negativity, and it’s ok to struggle with it. That’s truly what Epidemic is about. Owning the diseased parts of us and turning it into a strength."

== Track listing ==
No.	Title	Length
1.	"The Joker"	4:20
2.	"Other Side"	3:47
3.	"Defame Me"	3:19
4.	"Epidemic"	3:45
5.	"Let Me Down"	3:38
Total length:		18:49

== Personnel ==
- Ashley Costello - lead vocals
- Anthony Barro - bass, unclean vocals
- Nikki Misery - guitars
- Nick Rossi - drums
- Erik Ron - producer, mixer, engineer
- Eve Saint Raven - artwork
