= Dufresne (band) =

Italian post-hardcore band

- Origin: Vicenza, Italy
- Genres: Post-hardcore, screamo, alternative rock
- Years active: 2004–2010 (announced on hiatus in 2013)
- Labels: V2, Universal, Wynona
- Members: Nicola "Dominik" Cerantola; Matteo "Ciube" Tabacco; Davide Zenorini; Luca Dal Lago; Alessandro Costa
- Website: dufresne.it

Dufresne was an Italian post-hardcore band from Vicenza. Their last album release was in 2010, and they were announced to be officially on hiatus in 2013.

== History ==
Dufresne formed in January, 2004 with Nicola "Dominik" Cerantola on lead vocals, Davide Zenorini on drums, Matteo "Ciube" Tabacco on bass and vocals, Luca Dal Lago on guitar and Alessandro Costa on keyboards. The band took its name from Andy Dufresne, the main character from Stephen King's novel, and later film adaption by Frank Darabont, The Shawshank Redemption.

In 2005 the band recorded a twelve-song demo album, completely sung in Italian. Later the band re-recorded six tracks from the demo in English.

In 2006 Dufresne signed with V2 Records and released their debut album Atlantic. To promote the album the band participated at the Taste of Chaos Tour, supporting Underoath in Italy, and then embarked on a European tour, that comprehended France, Germany, Belgium, Netherlands and United Kingdom.

In October, 2007 the band went to Richmond, Virginia to record their second album, titled Lovers, with producer Andreas Magnusson. Lovers was released on April 11, 2008, via V2 Records/Universal Music Group. After the release of Lovers, Dufresne toured Italy supporting headliners Linea 77.

In 2009 Dufresne signed with Wynona Records. On May 14, 2010, the band released their third studio album, AM:PM.

In July 2013 it was announced on their Facebook page that Dufresne was on hiatus.

== Members ==
- Nicola "Dominik" Cerantola – lead vocals
- Matteo "Ciube" Tabacco – bass and vocals
- Luca Dal Lago – guitar
- Davide Zenorini – drums
- Alessandro Costa – keyboards and synthesizer

== Discography ==
- Lovers (Universal Music/V2 Records, 2008)
- AM:PM (Wynona Records, 2010)
