= Wrapped Up in Pinstripes =

EP by Farewell, My Love
- Released: December 9, 2014
- Recorded: September – October 2014
- Genre: Rock, acoustic
- Length: 19:19
- Label: StandBy Records
- Producer: Dan Parker & Connor Hurley

Farewell, My Love chronology
Gold Tattoos (2013)	Wrapped Up in Pinstripes (2014)

Professional ratings
Review scores
Source	Rating
The Prelude Press	4.5/5 stars
Substream Magazine	3.5/5 stars
Outburn	7/10 stars

Wrapped Up in Pinstripes is the third EP by Farewell, My Love, released on December 9, 2014, via StandBy Records. This is their first release with Chad Kowal on vocals instead of just drums. The EP is songs from previous releases re-recorded as acoustic and with Chad Kowal as vocals. The album was recorded between September and October 2014 with producers Dan Parker & Connor Hurley.

== Track listing ==
All tracks are written by Farewell, My Love.

Standard Edition
No.	Title	Length
1.	"My Perfect Thing (Acoustic)"	4:12
2.	"Skip the Memories (Acoustic)"	3:27
3.	"Portraits (Acoustic)"	2:56
4.	"Gold Tattoos (Acoustic)"	3:59
5.	"Paper Forts (Acoustic)"	4:45
Total length:		19:19
