= Every Sick, Disgusting Thought We've Got in Our Brain =

Studio album by The Venetia Fair
- Released: March 1, 2013
- Length: 47:56
- Producer: Steve Sopchak

The Venetia Fair chronology
The Pits (2011)	Every Sick, Disgusting Thought We've Got in Our Brain (2013)	...Basically Just Does Karaoke (2013)

Singles from Every Sick, Disgusting Thought We've Got in Our Brain
- 1. "The Day I Set Them Free" Released: February 19, 2013; 2. "Pride Alone Won't Put This Fire Out" Released: February 24, 2013

Every Sick, Disgusting Thought We've Got in Our Brain is the second full-length album by American rock band The Venetia Fair. It is their first independent release after departing from their previous record label Red Blue Records. It was recorded at The Square Studio in Syracuse, New York with producer Steve Sopchak and was released on March 1, 2013. The album was funded by fan donations through an extremely successful Kickstarter campaign.

== Kickstarter ==
On September 27, 2012, The Venetia Fair announced on AbsolutePunk that they were leaving Red Blue Records, who they had been signed with for three years, and that they would be releasing their next album independently. On October 22, 2012, they launched a Kickstarter campaign to crowdfund the recording and release of 'Every Sick, Disgusting Thought We've Got in Our Brain'. They released two videos explaining the campaign on YouTube. They set an original goal of raising $8,000 to cover the minimal cost of recording and releasing the album. They surpassed this goal within four days and set additional 'stretch goals' of $11,000 and $15,000 to fund additional costs including making music videos and bringing in outside musicians to be featured on the album. The band offered 30 different reward option for donating fans. Reward options included $5 for a digital download of the album, $50 for a personal thank you note and drawing from guitarist Michael Abiuso, or more expensive options for the more dedicated fans such as $200 for the costumes members wore for their first music video The Ringleader in 2009, $225 for bassist Mr. Chark's hair collection, $9,975 for one of drummer Chris Constantino's two pinky fingers, or $10,000 for one of Mr. Chark's three pinky fingers. On November 21, 2012, The Venetia Fair had raised a total of $17,657.

== Recording/production ==
The Venetia Fair began recording the album at Square Studio in Syracuse, NY. This was their second time working with producer Steve Sopchak AKA The Internet AKA The Dew Master, who also produced their 2011 EP 'The Pits'. The outside musicians that were brought into the studio for the album were Chris Nolan of the band The Action on trumpet and French horn, Dan King on trombone, Jake Weinreb on xylophone, Stephanie Babirak on harp, and Asspoop AKA Jeff Eckert on backing vocals.

== Concept ==
Six of the songs on the album are part of a story line called The Scientist and the Painter about a man who is a scientist who believes that if God is a ubiquitous being, he must exist in the only infinite thing we know of which is the capacity of the human mind (I: We Used To Worship The Moon). The man then meets a woman with a 'questionable past', falls in love, and begins painting a portrait of her (II: The Dirt Won't Keep Your Secrets). She inevitably betrays him and leaves. In his heartbreak, he starts to go insane and dedicates his time to his two passions: searching for the truth about God through his research, and creating the portrait he started painting of the woman (III: Go On, Paint Me A Picture). He uses his memory as the only reference for the portrait, but can never get the color of her lips right. At one point, he tried to use his own blood as paint, and still can't get the color correct. (V: You Never Looked Like This). He continues trying to find God. Claiming it's for the greater good and will eventually pay off, he begins killing people and bringing them back to his lab to literally search their brains to find God, because the mind is infinite just like God purportedly is. The man is disgusted with himself, but he loves it (IV: The Saints Of Gomorrah). The painting of the woman begins to look less and less like the actual woman, and becomes a portrait of his idealized vision of her in his memory, blocking out all of the negative things about her. During one of his outings, he meets the woman again but doesn't recognize her. He kills her and brings her back to his lab and only then realizes who she is. He isn't too bothered by his actions because he's fallen more in love with his memory of her and the portrait than the actual woman herself (V: You Never Looked Like This). After killing her, he finds that she was pregnant with his child. He then breaks down further and believes he hears his unborn son speaking to him. The son explains to his father that God can't be inside the infant's brain because no one was able to place him there. He convinces his father that the only place left that God could possibly be is the man's own brain. The man then kills himself by cracking his head on the concrete floor to release God into the world (VI: I Could End My Search Tonight).

== Track listing ==
All songs written and performed by The Venetia Fair. All lyrics written by Benny Santoro. Additional arrangement by Steve Sopchak and Jake Weinreb.

No.	Title	Length
1.	"Too Late To Dream"	2:33
2.	"The Day I Set Them Free"	3:39
3.	"I: We Used To Worship The Moon"	4:14
4.	"Pride Alone Won't Put This Fire Out"	3:18
5.	"II: The Dirt Won't Keep Your Secrets"	3:53
6.	"Only in the Morning"	3:46
7.	"Bleeding A Stone"	3:26
8.	"The Sky Came Down"	3:31
9.	"III: Go On, Paint Me A Picture"	4:11
10.	"IV: The Saints Of Gomorrah"	3:48
11.	"V: You Never Looked Like This"	3:59
12.	"Puking Platitudes"	3:07
13.	"VI: I Could End My Search Tonight"	4:29
Total length:		47:56

== Credits ==
The Venetia Fair

- Benny Santoro – lead vocals
- Mr. Chark King – bass guitar
- Michael Abiuso – guitar, backing vocals, cello, violin
- Chris Constantino – drums
- Joseph Occhiuti – Piano

Additional Musicians

- Asspoop – backing vocals
- Steve Sopchak – percussion, sousaphone
- Chris Nolan – trumpet, French horn
- Jake Weinreb – xylophone
- Dan King – trombone
- Stephanie Babirak – harp

Production

- Produced by Steve Sopchak and The Venetia Fair
- Recorded by Steve Sopchak at The Square Studio, Syracuse, NY and Michael Abiuso at Switchbitch Studios
- Mixed and mastered by Steve Sopchak at The Square Studio, Syracuse, NY
- Artwork and layout by Mr. Chark and The Venetia Fair
