= Joshua Ingram =

Canadian drummer (born 1992)

- Born: 17 December 1992 (age 33)
- Origin: Ontario, Canada
- Genres: Rock; Pop; Metal
- Occupations: Drummer, percussionist
- Years active: 2010–present
- Labels: Sony, Century Media, Roc Nation

Joshua Ingram (born 17 December 1992) is a rock drummer and percussionist. Ingram is best known as the former drummer of American hard rock band New Years Day.

He has also toured for internationally loved bands The Defiled and Divine Realm, as well as a Rolling Stone 2014 "best new artist", DOROTHY.

== Career ==
=== 2010–2011: Ottawa Bluesfest ===
At the early age of 17, Ingram was the youngest musician to play the 2010 Ottawa Bluesfest. This opportunity allowed Ingram to share the stage with Grammy winners Drake and Iron Maiden, along with personal childhood influence, Rush.

=== 2012–2015: Vans Warped Tour, etc. ===
Ingram's musical career emerged on the 2012 Vans Warped Tour main stage when he drummed for shock rock band Vampires Everywhere!. Other main acts on the tour included genre leaders The Used, Motionless in White, Every Time I Die and Sleeping with Sirens. Ingram's talent and wild stage presence earned him artist endorsements from TRX and ddrum that summer. Ingram toured in support of Billboard 200 bands In This Moment and Butcher Babies, drumming on the 2014 No Place Like Home Tour (U.K.) and the 2015 Black Widow Tour (U.S.).

=== 2016–2017: New Years Day ===
After the successful completion of the 2016 Retrograde Tour (U.S.), Ingram was officially announced as the newest member of Billboard 200 band New Years Day. Shortly thereafter, Ingram performed with New Years Day at the 2017 Alternative Press Music Awards (APMAs) with legendary guest rock vocalist Lzzy Hale. The band headlined the 2017 Vans Warped Tour alongside other main stage acts including Hawthorne Heights, The Ataris and CKY. New Years Day opened for rock legends Ozzy Osbourne and Nine Inch Nails at the 2017 Monster Energy Aftershock Festival, concluding Ingram's final run with the band.
