= Vanilla Sky (band) =

Italian pop punk band

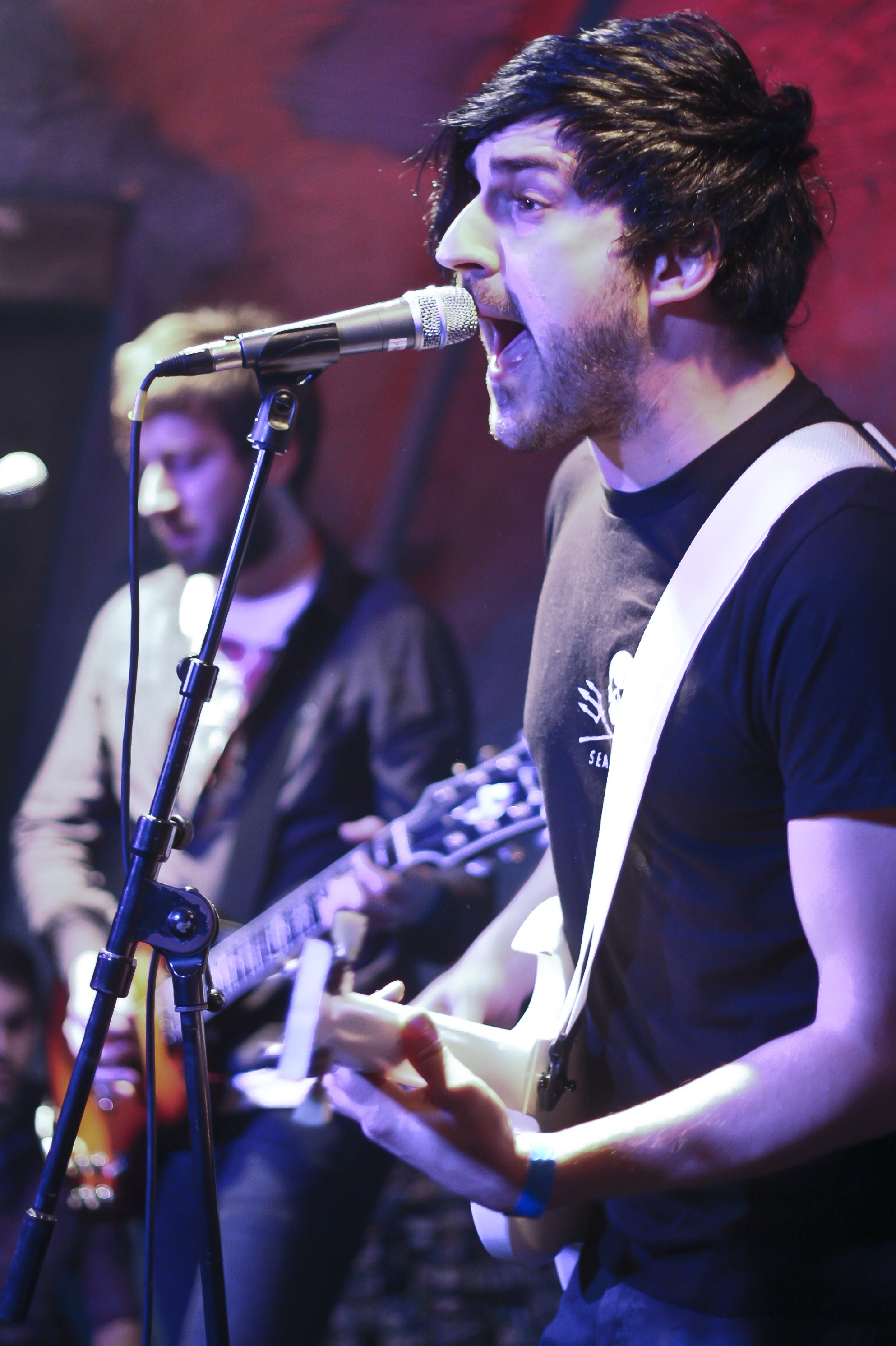

Background information
- Origin: Rome, Italy
- Genres: Pop punk, emo
- Years active: 2002–present
- Labels: Universal Music; Wynona Records; Ambience Records; Capitol Records
- Members: Daniele Brian Autore; Vincenzo Mario Cristi; Francesco Sarsano; Jacopo Volpe
- Past members: Luca Alessandrelli; Antonio Filippelli
- Website: vanillaskyrock.com

Vanilla Sky is an Italian pop-punk group formed in 2002. Named after the 2001 film of the same name, their first album, Play It If You Can't Say It, was released on November 6, 2002. The band currently consists of Jacopo Volpe on drums, Francesco Sarsano on bass, and both Vincenzo Mario Cristi and Daniele Brian Autore on vocals and guitar. To date they have released four albums, regularly play tours in mainland Europe and have had modest success in Japan.

== History ==
=== 2002-2004: Formation and early career ===
Vanilla Sky was formed in February 2002. The band members met in Rome, Italy, intent on starting a new project which would mesh previous experiences with a new American punk style. They recorded a five-track demo entitled Play It If You Can't Say It and began playing live shows. Their demo sold out within the first two months, catching the attention of the Italian punk-rock scene and emerging indie label Wynona Records. In 2003, they signed their first record deal with Wynona Records. Their split CD, entitled Too Loud for You, was released shortly afterwards. It was quickly followed by another split CD entitled The Rest Is History. This EP was released by indie label Ambience Records, which allowed for distribution and promotion around the world.

=== 2005-2006: Waiting For Something and concert tours ===
In the summer of 2003, the band took a break from recording in order to perform live. After returning home, they re-entered the studio in order to record their first album, Waiting for Something. Upon releasing Waiting for Something, the band began a six-week tour across Europe with Forty Winks and The Break. In 2004, the band began touring Europe for a second time to promote their album alongside Maxeen. The tour lasted one and a half months. Shortly afterwards, the band was invited by The Ataris to open their Italian tour. Another European tour followed as the band celebrated the success of their first album. From June to September 2004, the band played at several open air festivals across Europe. They shared the stage as co-headliners with Yellowcard and Flogging Molly at the Bologna Independent Days festival. A month later, the band toured Italy for three months.

In 2007, album was produced and distributed by Heart On Fire Records (Argentina) in South America included an international edition that included a video clip.

In response to their growing popularity, the Play It If You Can't Say It EP was re-issued by Wynona Records in December 2004 with three extra unreleased tracks. It was released throughout Europe and Japan. In January 2005, the band toured Germany, including a live performance on national television. Towards the end of the month a Japanese tour was confirmed. The band returned home from the tour but shortly left Italy to headline the Punk is Dead-tour 2005 in Austria. Immediately afterwards, from March to May, another European tour passing through Spain, Belgium, the Netherlands and Germany followed, in addition to a maiden tour of Great Britain.

On May 27, 2005, the band's first full-length CD was finally released in the United States, distributed by Capitol Records. During the summer the band performed again at several festivals throughout Europe, which included the "Rock in Idro" with acts such as NOFX, Good Charlotte, The Offspring, The Hives, My Chemical Romance. Following this the band attained the role of support act on The Offspring's German tour.

=== 2007-2009: Changes, Umbrella and Lineup changes ===
After almost a year spent on pre-production writing, arranging and constantly changing the songs the quartet started in early 2006 to record the final version of the album. Unfortunately all the recorded data was accidentally lost forcing the band to re-record the whole album. Later, the band returned to play the Punk Is Dead Tour 2006 and gaining the chance to support +44 in their Italian show. The 16 track album Changes contains three songs in Italian, breaking from their normal English singing style. The album is a mix of power pop and punk rock. The opening track and first single "Break It Out" pushed the band into the mainstream with magazines and TV channels of the continental market taking interest (i.e.: Rock Sound cover, MTV Italy TRL chart, etc.). This allowed the band to promote the record through a video shoot in Las Vegas, United States. Changes sold more than 25,000 copies and over 5,000 copies sold of the EP reissue were sold. Building on this, Vanilla Sky entered the studio to start recording the pre-production of a new album. In the meantime, Mark Hoppus of Blink-182 and +44 noticed the band, thanks to Atticus (a music sponsor company owned by Blink-182 members). He enjoyed the band's new demos and interviewed the Roman band members live on his personal web podcast (episode No. 12); along with playing on the demo track, "Nightmare". The first single, "Break It Out" would eventually appear on international television and become part of the videogame, Guitar Hero: World Tour.

For the first time in Italy, the band launched a video podcast, complete with video episodes uploaded twice a month, regarding the band's life, recording sessions and private content, known as Vanilla Sky Television. They received several offers from the biggest companies in the music business, with the band finally signing with the major label, Universal Records. The major debut's album was released on June 22, 2007. After just a month, the group joined one of the biggest rock festivals in Europe: The Frequency Festival in Salzburg, Austria. It was complete with three days of live music and two stages, a sold out event with 40,000 people. The Roman quartet performed to 12,000 people and shared the stage with bands such as Beatsteaks, The Ark, Tool, Jimmy Eat World and Fall Out Boy. Vanilla Sky are known for their powerful live performances.

Towards the end of the summer, Vanilla Sky did more recording and in their practice room they recorded a cover of, Rihanna hit, "Umbrella" in a punk rock style. The band also recorded a low-budget video for the song. The song received airplay on numerous radio stations in Italy and Europe, in addition to this, rock magazine, Kerrang has dedicated a ring tone to the cover. On YouTube, the video is in 1st place as the most played stream in Brazil and 64th all over the world. Additionally, MTV Pulse asked for and got a one-week exclusive of the video, with the song featuring on TRL one week later. Following this, the band began touring again, promoting the album internationally, including a headlining tour in Austria. Also, popular YouTube drummer Cobus Potgieter did a drum cover of the song as part of his drum cover series.

In April 2009, the official site at Myspace and in an episode of Vanilla Sky TV, Cristi and Autore announced that the band's lineup had changed. The bassist and drummer, Sarsano and Alessandrelli respectively, had left the band. The reasons for the departure of both was apparently because of work, with no resentment on the part of the guitarists for this act. A while later, the positions were filled by Jacopo Volpe on drums, who had previously played with Cristi on his other project called Rome Is For Lovers, and Antonio Filippelli. In October 2009 they began Punk is Dead Tour 2009.

=== 2010–present: Fragile and The Band Not The Movie ===
After the departure of Alessandrelli and Sarsano, Vanilla Sky TV ended and a new phase of video podcasts started, called Vanilla Sky Clips: A Window Into The Sky, which had the same purpose of Vanilla Sky TV. Fragile was written and recorded between the Fall of 2008 and Spring of 2009 and features the work of American producer, Jamie Woolford (The Stereo, The AKAs, Lydia, and The Format) and Big Bass Brian who mastered "Changes."

== Band members ==
Current members

- Daniele Brian Autore – Vocals, guitar (2002–present)
- Francesco Sarsano - Bass (2002-2009, 2012–present)
- Vincenzo Mario Cristi – Vocals, guitar (2002–present)
- Jacopo Volpe - Drums (2009–present)

Former members

- Luca Alessandrelli – Drums, backing vocals (2002–2009)
- Antonio Filippelli – Bass, backing vocals (2009-2012)

== Discography ==
=== Studio albums ===
- Play It If You Can't Say It (2004)
- Waiting for Something (2005)
- Changes (Universal Music) (2007)
- Fragile (2010)
- The Band Not the Movie (2012)

=== Compilation albums ===
- Vanilla Sky - Tour Edition (2006)
- Punk Is Dead (Cover Album) (2010)

=== Extended plays ===
- Too Loud for You (2002)
- The Rest Is History (2003)
- Another Lie Like Home (2014)

=== Singles ===
Year	Title	Chart positions					Album
Year	Title	ITA Airplay	ITA	BEL	NET	POL	Album
2004	"Distance"	-	-	-	-	-	Waiting for Something
2007	"Break It Out"	23	-	-	-	-	Changes
2007	"Umbrella"	5	-	20	68	62	Changes
2008	"Goodbye"	-	-	-	-	-	Changes
2010	"Just Dance"	-	-	-	-	-	Fragile
2010	"Vivere Diversi/On Fire"	-	-	-	-	-	Fragile
2012	"Ten Years"	-	-	-	-	-	The Band Not The Movie

=== Music videos ===
Year	Title
2004	Distance; The Point
2007	Umbrella; Break it out
2008	Goodbye
2010	Just Dance; 1981; Vivere Diversi; L'ultimo Primo Bacio * First last kiss On fire Frames
2012	Ten Years
2013	Slow Motion End; Invincible
2014	Zvenit Yanvarskaya Viuga
