= The Venetia Fair =

American rock band

- Origin: Marblehead, Massachusetts, US
- Genres: Experimental rock; alternative rock; circus music; post-hardcore; symphonic rock
- Years active: 2006–2015
- Label: Red Blue Records (2009–2012)
- Past members: Benny Santoro; Mike Abiuso; Charles "Mr. Chark" King; Joseph Occhiuti; Austin Ferrante; Chris Constantino; Samuel Parsons; Jessica Homan; Jake Weinreb
- Website: www.thevenetiafair.com

The Venetia Fair was an American rock band from Marblehead, Massachusetts, United States. Formed in 2006, the band's final line-up was lead vocalist Benny Santoro, guitarist Mike Abiuso, bassist Charles "Mr. Chark" King, keyboardist Joseph Occhiuti and drummer Austin Ferrante. The band signed with Red Blue Records in 2009 to release their first album, The Circus and was featured in the Alternative Press 2013 edition of 100 Bands You Need to Know. The group disbanded in December 2015.

== Background ==
=== Inception (2006–2009) ===
The Venetia Fair was formed by Benny Santoro and Charles "Mr. Chark" King in 2006 after they graduated from Marblehead High School in Marblehead, Massachusetts. The two of them had been in previous bands prior such as Sally Boy (which featured Benny on drums), Sprained Personality and most notably their black metal/glam rock fusion band entitled Bottom of the Blood Well. The band's name came after Pluto became a dwarf planet and originates from a girl named Venetia Phair, who was the first to propose the name for Pluto. They recruited Samuel Parsons on bass (who was also a former member of Sprained Personality and Bottom of the Blood Well), Jake Weinreb on drums and Jessica Homan on keys to record some demos. These demos amongst others were uploaded to the band's Last.fm page.

Shortly after signing with Red Blue Records in March 2009 to release their first album, the band parted ways with Jessica and Jake. Joseph Occhiuti and Chris Constantino, whom they meet through a craigslist ad, were their replacements. Joseph joined the band after he and Benny unexpectedly became friends in college, after previously meeting due to a former girlfriend who had an affair with both of them.

=== The Circus (2009–2011) ===
Their debut full-length album, The Circus, was released on June 12, 2009. The album was produced by Dan Coutant as well as Andy Wildrick and Nick Crescenzo of The Dear Hunter. The Circus is divided into two parts, the first being called "The Overture", consisting of the first four songs, and the second being "The Circus", consisting of the last six songs. The last six songs on the album flow into each other creating one continuous song although listed as separate tracks. Drummer Chris Constantino states, "The Circus began as a six-song concept piece that centered around a circus with no audience as a way to discuss the absurdity of human existence".

In 2010, The Venetia Fair was featured in issues #19 and #22 of Substream Music Press. Immediately after the album was released, The Venetia Fair began touring nearly nonstop. From the time The Circus was released to the time their first EP The Pits was released, the band went on five tours across the country as well as playing a great number of shows in between tours, many of which were local shows or in New England. They toured with many labelmate bands, such as Sound We Sleep and Phone Calls from Home, and with other bands not on the label, including Kiss Kiss, Trophy Scars and LoveHateHero.

In April 2011, bassist Sam Parsons announced he would be leaving the band after finishing the "I Have Made Fire!" tour with Set It Off and Lacerda. He was then replaced by Mike Abiuso, a former member of the bands Kiss Kiss and The Gay Blades. Mike met the band after Kiss Kiss and The Venetia Fair toured together on the 2010 "Prankcalls and Snowballs" tour.

=== The Pits (2011–2012) ===
On June 24, 2011, The Venetia Fair released a 5-track EP titled The Pits, featuring four original songs and one cover. The album was produced by Steve Sopchak at The Square Studio in Syracuse, NY. After releasing the EP Mike and Mr. Chark switched instruments, putting Mike on guitar and Mr. Chark on bass. These have been their instruments since.

The band played a record release show in Wakefield, Massachusetts on June 24, 2011, with the band Vuvuzela. This kicked off a short tour with Vuvuzela to promote the album. Following this tour, the band played 16 dates of Warped Tour 2011 on the Dzambo Stage. After finishing their run on Warped Tour, they proceeded to play three more tours in 2011 and one tour in 2012 before taking time to work on their next album. Between these tours and writing, they again played a handful of shows, mostly local.

In September 2012, the band announced that they had left Red Blue Records and would be self-releasing their next album, funding it via Kickstarter.

=== Every Sick, Disgusting Thought We've Got in Our Brain and ...Basically Just Does Karaoke (2012–2014) ===
In October 2012 the band began pulling together the means to make their first self-released album, Every Sick, Disgusting Thought We've Got in Our Brain, by using the website Kickstarter to reach out to their fans for funding. The kickstarter ran from October 22, 2012, to November 20, 2012. The initial goal of $8,000 was reached within four days and more reach goals of $11,000 and $15,000 were established for an accompanying brass section and two music videos. The kickstarter finished with $17,657, well over both the original and reach goals. Gifts for backers included anything from T-shirts and signed posters to musical lessons, personal songs, cover song requests, lifelong access to concerts, parts in their music videos, a treasure map, pinky fingers, a hair collection, going on tour with the band, and plenty more odds and ends.

The first single off the album was "The Day I Set Them Free", released on February 19, 2013. The album was released for a listening party for Kickstarter backers on the February 20, 2013. On February 24, 2013, "Pride Alone Won't Put This Fire Out" was released as a second single for the album. The album was fully released to the public on March 1, 2013, followed by a CD release show at 3065 Live in East Wareham, Massachusetts that night. This kicked off the month-long "Every Sick Disgusting Thought" tour to promote the album. The album was originally released digitally and on CD, but on August 10, 2013, the album was available on limited edition vinyl. The records were pressed and released by guitarist Mike Abiuso's record label, SwitchBitch Records and was limited to 250 copies. The vinyl featured additional artwork in the form of a rotating pinwheel of images beneath the front cover, a color-splattered record, and 100 of the 250 packages included a special SwitchBitch package including a poster, the 2013 SwitchBitch Sampler, and download cards for artists on the label. On June 26, 2013, a music video for "The Day I Set Them Free" was released. In the fall, The Venetia Fair set out on two tours, "The Barf Art" tour from September to October 2013, followed by the "Karen and Her Bag of Daddies" tour from November to December 2013. The band was featured in the Alternative Press 2013 edition of 100 Bands You Need to Know which was published on March 1, 2013, the same day as the band's sophomore full-length album "Every Sick, Disgusting thought We've Got in Our Brain" was released.

During the Kickstarter, six fans pledged money to be able to request a song for the band to cover. These covers were released on December 24, 2013, in an EP titled ...Basically Just Does Karaoke. Lead vocalist Benny Santoro comments, "We said we'd cover anything they wanted and we got 6 very different songs from different genres and different eras in music, each with their own challenges. We had no intention of simply playing these songs as they were originally played (especially 'Bohemian Rhapsody'... we didn't wanna go anywhere near that song!) so we took our time and completely rebuilt them from the ground up to make sure we made them our own. Some of the songs we loved and had to figure out how to tweak them without totally ruining them and some of the songs we hated and had to figure out how to make them good, but I believe we rose to the challenge and, with the help of our Kickstarter backers, put together a very strange and very cool little cover EP. We definitely trashed some classic tunes, but it's all very tongue-in-cheek since we would never take a cover song seriously 'cause it's basically just doing karaoke..."

Following the release of this EP, the band scheduled a tour with A Lot Like Birds, Stolas and Sianvar on the "Substance Sequence" tour from January to February 2014. The band, however, had to drop off the tour early after Benny's throat got infected, risking long term damage if he had continued to perform.

=== Breakup (2015) ===
On March 5, 2015, drummer Chris Constantino played his last show with the band. The departure was officially announced on the band's Facebook page on April 1. His reason for leaving is unknown but he remains good friends with the band and will be continuing to work alongside Mr. Chark with their company Black Market Custom. Chris was replaced by Austin Ferrante of the band Analog Heart. Austin was the touring drummer in January 2015 for The Venetia Fair's short tour with Trophy Wives. It was said at Chris' last show with the band that Austin will be the official drummer from then forward.

On December 22, 2015, The Venetia Fair announced on their Facebook page that they are permanently breaking up and not going on hiatus. They released a final song titled "Death Is The Poor Man's Doctor" and announced three final concerts in New York City, Providence RI, and Somerville, MA which were performed between February 19–21, 2016. Former bassist Sam Parsons made a special appearance at the New York City concert and former drummer Chris Constantino appeared at all three final shows.

== Musical style and influences ==
The band is frequently compared to bands Foxy Shazam, Panic! at the Disco, My Chemical Romance and The Used amongst others. Lead vocalist Benny Santoro stated in a 2010 interview, "Musically, it's intended to be theatric, melodic, chaotic, catchy, creepy and startling all at the same time so we're influenced by a lot of different stuff. Truthfully I don't think there's even one band that everyone in the group agrees on so our influences are kind of all over the place." The band has given The Blood Brothers, Billy Joel, Danny Elfman, Mötley Crüe and The B-52's as some examples of their wide variety of influential musicians.

== Members ==
Final line-up

- Benny Santoro – vocals (2006–2015)
- Mike Abiuso- guitar, backing vocals (2011–2015); bass (2011)
- Charles "Mr. Chark" King – bass (2011–2015); guitar (2006–2011)
- Joseph Occhiuti – piano, keys, backing vocals (2009–2015) (in Ice Nine Kills as of 2019)
- Austin Ferrante – drums (2015)

Former members

- Chris Constantino – drums (2009–2015)
- Samuel Parsons – bass (2006–2011)
- Jessica Homan – keys (2006–2009)
- Jake Weinreb – drums (2006–2009)

== Discography ==
Studio albums

- The Circus (2009, Red Blue Records)
- Every Sick, Disgusting Thought We've Got in Our Brain (2013, self-released)

EPs

- The Pits (2011, Red Blue Records)
- ...Basically Just Does Karaoke (2013, self-released)

Demos

- (2007, self-released)

1. "Who Would've Thought" (rare)
2. "Let Me Explain"
3. "I Know Why They Feel the Way They Do"
4. "This Is All a Forced Metaphor"

- (2008, self-released)

1. "Let's Just Forget About This"
2. "What Do We Have Here?"
3. "Friday Is My Horse"
4. "Go On, Paint Me a Picture"
5. "It's Unbelievable to Me"

- (2012, featured on the compilation "Yuletides & Stage Dives")

1. "Master Blaster" – a demo of "Too Late To Dream"
Other songs

- "Gone Gamble" – a personal song written as a Kickstarter backer's reward for Shawnnn Gambleeee
- "Death Is The Poor Man's Doctor" – The Venetia Fair's final song

== Videography ==
- "The Ringleader" – directed by Greg Ephraim/produced by Robby Starbuck and Mike Krilivsky (2010, The Circus)
- "A Man Like Me" – directed by Scott Hansen/produced by Mike Krilivsky (2011, The Circus)
- "The Day I Set Them Free" – directed by Scott Hansen (2013, Every Sick, Disgusting Thought We've Got in Our Brain)
