= Ben Graves =

American singer-songwriter

Ben Graves is a Nashville-based singer/songwriter, guitarist, and harmonica player. Originally from Martin, Tennessee, he was the lead singer in a high school band whose other members (Carl Bell and Jeff Abercrombie) would become the hard rock outfit Fuel. He attended Wesleyan University (B.A., Music, 1993), Berklee College of Music (1991–92, 1993), and Washington State University (M.A., Jazz Studies, 1996) and moved to San Francisco, where he lived from 1996 to 2003, working with Norah Jones sidemen Lee Alexander and Rob Burger, as well as current The Decemberists members Jenny Conlee and Nate Query. In 2003, he moved to Nashville Tennessee, where he worked as a sideman with country artists Rebecca Lynn Howard, James Otto, Amy Dalley, Raul Malo, among many others, and remains active as a session musician, performing songwriter, sideman, and educator.

Graves has performed with Lyle Lovett, Nanci Griffith, Kid Rock, Modern Jazz Quartet bassist Percy Heath, Late Show drummer Anton Fig, Flaco Jimenez, Steve Berlin, and many others. He has played venues such as the Grand Ole Opry, the Ryman Auditorium, the Fillmore, the Great American Music Hall, the Edmonton Folk Festival, the Highline Ballroom, the Austin City Limits Music Festival, and has appeared on The Tonight Show with Jay Leno. He has recorded three original CDs: Crazy Italians (1997), Memphis (2001) and Live (2003). Crazy Italians included the cut "Princess Grace," which was featured on the Performing Songwriter magazine 1999 CD sampler showcasing their picks for the top 12 unsigned independent releases. Critic Russell Hall of Performing Songwriter called Crazy Italians "consistently fresh and inventive," and "intelligent pop music--tightly crafted songs that lend themselves well to improvisation in a live setting."

"Memphis" features drummer Scott Amendola, keyboardist Rob Burger (Tin Hat Trio, Norah Jones), and bassist Lee Alexander (Norah Jones, Amos Lee). "Memphis" has been played on over 300 radio stations worldwide, and in the summer of 2002, charted top 30 at some 50 stations, such as WTSR Ewing, NJ (#3), WNYK Nyack, NY (#10), and WUIC Chicago (#14). Rosalie Howarth of San Francisco's KFOG called it "very, very good"; "excellent CD," said KRZA in Colorado; and "a great, great disc," said music director Sean Wilson of WTSR.
