= BryanStars =

American YouTuber

- Born: Bryan Odell; May 22, 1990 (age 36); Sendai, Japan
- Occupations: Music Journalist, YouTuber, Musician, Artist Manager
- Years active: 2008–2017

Bryan Odell (born May 22, 1990), better known by his online alias BryanStars, is an American former music interviewer, YouTube personality, musician, and artist manager. He is best known for his BryanStars Interviews series, where he interviews with popular artists in the alternative scene, including Black Veil Brides, Asking Alexandria, and Falling in Reverse.

== Early life ==
Odell was born on May 22, 1990, in Japan, where he resided until he was eight years old. His family later relocated to Nebraska when he was a teenager. In his senior year of high school, his short film Energy Crisis in America, highlighting rising gas prices, won third place in the high school section of the StudentCam competition, hosted by C-SPAN.

He attended the University of Nebraska–Lincoln for two years, majoring in Broadcast Journalism. While in university, he did an internship where he would interview professional bands for a local television station.

Odell chose to drop out of university to focus his attention on his YouTube channel "BryanStars" after winning YouTube NextUp in 2011. Through the NextUp contest, YouTube aimed to foster creators on its platform. Odell and 25 other YouTubers received a $35,000 grant for their channel and a multi-day workshop in New York City with professional online bloggers. At the time, he had about 55,000 subscribers.

== YouTube career ==
Odell is best known for his BryanStars Interviews, series on his YouTube channel, BryanStars. He primarily publishes interviews and music videos from bands of the rock and heavy metal scene.

During his career, Odell interviewed artists including Asking Alexandria, Blood On The Dance Floor, Millionaires, Never Shout Never, Motionless In White, Pierce the Veil, Black Veil Brides, All Time Low, Sleeping with Sirens, The Ready Set, One Ok Rock, Panic! at the Disco, Twenty One Pilots, Avenged Sevenfold, Her Bright Skies, Escape the Fate, Suicide Silence, Disturbed, Creed, Hollywood Undead, Korn, Three Days Grace, Bullet For My Valentine, Cannibal Corpse, Chevelle, and Slipknot, as well as artists like Rob Zombie, Papa Roach, Cody Simpson, G-Eazy, Mitchel Musso and winners of American Idol. Odell has also interviewed record producer Matt Good and YouTube stars Shane Dawson, Michael Buckley and Dave Days. He has published more than 1000 band interviews and music videos to his YouTube Channel.

In 2013, BryanStars Interviews was voted by music fans as the "Best Music Blog" in the Alternative Press Reader's Choice Poll 2013. BryanStars Interviews was nominated for a Shorty Award for "Best Web Show" in 2014 along with Jerry Seinfeld's Comedians in Cars Getting Coffee. In 2014, retailer Journeys produced "This Is My Journey" segment about Odell that played in stores nationwide.

=== Never Shout Never incident ===
On June 3, 2012, Never Shout Never was interviewed by Odell in an interview that was being covered by The New York Times. About halfway through the interview, Ingle cut Odell off, denouncing his show as "a joke" and his questions as "bullshit" with bassist Taylor MacFee also taking Odell's interview question papers from him and throwing them on the floor. A few minutes later the band abruptly ended the interview, leaving Odell in tears.

An outpour of support for Odell resulted from the incident. Numerous musicians such as Kellin Quinn of Sleeping with Sirens, Chris Fronzak of Attila, and Andy Biersack of Black Veil Brides came to Odell's defense. In a Stickam broadcast, Ingle expressed remorse for making Odell cry, later admitting that he had taken acid earlier the day of the interview.

In 2024, Sergio Pereira of Grunge included the incident in his list of "Rock Stars Who Ditched Awkward Interviews".

=== Warped YouTube Program ===
In 2014, Odell was picked to be one of the "Warped YouTubers" with Damon Fizzy, Johnnie Guilbert, CYR and Piddleass. The following year, Warped Tour made Odell the official host of the tour. Odell worked with Warped Tour throughout 2015 as their official host on social media, announcing over 100 bands for the tour.

Odell taught a class on the 2015 Vans Warped Tour called "YouTube 101" where he taught aspiring YouTubers how to pursue a career in social media.

=== My Digital Escape ===
Odell then founded "My Digital Escape," a collaborative project and YouTube channel featuring numerous alternative creators who shared a similar passion for music. After a national tour which visited over 25 cities, the channel stopped uploading in May 2016 due to controversies stemming from the tour. The channel reached 800,000 subscribers and 100 million views. The channel prominently featured Odell, Johnnie Guilbert, Shannon Taylor (HeyThereImShannon), Luke Wale, Kyle David Hall, Alex Dorame, and Jordan Sweeto. It was later revealed Odell had a management contract with most or all of the MDE members.

== Musical endeavors ==
In 2016, Odell went into the studio with ZK Studios to record his debut EP. On March 21, 2016, BryanStars announced the release of a 5-track EP entitled "Follow Your Dreams". It was released on April 1, 2016, and charted on Billboard at #22 on the Alternative New Artist Album Chart, #59 on the New Artist Album Chart and #128 on the Indie Albums Chart.

== MDE 2.0 ==
After multiple viral incidents in 2016, including a controversial 'MDE 2.0' rebrand replacing the original members, Odell stepped back from his social media ventures, specifically his YouTube channels. He has not been active on any of his YouTube channels or social media in several years.

== Discography ==
=== Extended plays ===
List of extended plays
Title	Album details
Follow Your Dreams	Released: April 1, 2016; Formats: CD, Digital Download
Picture Perfect	Released: December 4, 2016; Formats: Digital Download

=== Singles ===
List of singles
Title	Writer(s)	Producer(s)	Year	Album
"Shut Up and Kiss Me"	James Tyler Hagen, Bryan Odell	Zack Odom, Kenneth Mount	2016	Follow Your Dreams
"Tonight"	James Tyler Hagen, Bryan Odell	Zack Odom, Kenneth Mount	2016	Follow Your Dreams
"Smile"	James Tyler Hagen, Bryan Odell	Zack Odom, Kenneth Mount	2016	Follow Your Dreams

== Awards and recognition ==
- 2011: YouTube NextUp
- 2013: Alternative Press Magazine — "Best Music Blog"
- 2014: Shorty Award for "Best Web Show" — Nominated
