= Wynona Records =

- Founded: 2000
- Genre: Pop punk
- Country of origin: Italy
- Official website: Wynona Records Official Website

Wynona Records is an Italian record label specialising in pop punk albums. Artists who have worked with Wynona Records included 9MM, Duff, Helia, If I Die Today, and Vanilla Sky.

== Notable artists ==
- Cry Excess
- Digger
- Duff
- Dufresne
- Ephen Rian
- Halfway Home
- Helia
- Hopes Die Last
- If I Die Today
- Know Margaret
- Last Day Before Holiday
- Manges
- Melody Fall
- New Hope
- The Gaia Corporation
- The Travoltas
- Vanilla Sky
- Your Hero
