= Snow White's Poison Bite =

Finnish rock band

Background information
- Origin: Joensuu, Finland
- Genres: Horror punk; post-hardcore; alternative metal; nu metal
- Years active: 2006–2018
- Labels: Sound of Finland; Poko; Victory
- Past members: Allan Cotterill; Hannu Saarimaa; Juuso Puhakka; Tuomo Korander; Jarkko Penttinen; Teemu Leikas; Niko Hyttinen; Emil Pohjalimen; Dylan Broda; Tuomo Räisänen

Snow White's Poison Bite was a Finnish rock band formed in Joensuu in 2006.

== History ==
Allan Cotterill, who was originally from the UK and moved to Finland at a young age, founded the band with Juuso Puhakka, Tuomo Korander and Teemu Leikas. Later, in 2008, its lineup was completed with the addition of bassist Jarkko Penttinen. At the end of 2009, Puhakka left the band due to personal and musical disagreements, ever since the band became a quartet when Cotterill moved on from guitar/clean vocals to lead vocals. Cotterill was born in the UK but has been living in Finland since he was six years old while the rest of the band's members were born and raised in Finland. Cotterill writes all music and lyrics for Snow White's Poison Bite.

In May 2008, SWPB won Big Boom band competition. The prize was three days studio time and a gig at well-known midsummer festival Himos festival. In May 2009, Snow White's Poison Bite played as an opening act for American post-hardcore band Alesana in Helsinki. They have also been touring with Music Against Drugs -tour in Finland, which is part of the Youth Against Drugs (YAD) organization.

At the beginning of 2009, SWPB signed a contract with Poko Rekords/EMI Finland. In February 2009, Poko released SWPB's first EP Drama Through Your Stereo. In early 2010, the band signed a recording contract with Sound of Finland's Hyeena Trax -label and released two singles, "Valentine's Doom" as free download and "Kristy Killings". Their debut album The Story of Kristy Killings, was released on 27 October 2010. The Japanese version of the album was released through Marquee/Avalon and digitally through iTunes in the US.

On 5 May 2011, Tuomo Korander, Jarkko Penttinen and Teemu Leikas announced their departure from the band, forcing them to cancel their remaining tour dates, and leaving Allan Cotterill the only remaining member.

On 19 January 2013, it was announced that the band's Victory Records label debut, Featuring: Dr. Gruesome and the Gruesome Gory Horror Show would be released on 16 April. The album received predominantly favorable reviews, stating that the album is packed full of energy and charisma, containing "near pop punk before divulging into massive breakdowns".

The band announced their disbandment on 11 November 2018, where singer Jeremy Allan Cotterill announced a solo project called TH13TEENTH, in which they released lots of merchandise but only one song, 'Disgusting'.

== Musical style ==
Snow White's Poison Bite's music is self-proclaimed as "More than just Horror Punk", although Metal Injection argued their sound is more liked to "proto-nü-metal".

== Members ==
Last lineup

- Allan(Jeremy 13th)Cotterill – lead vocals (2006–2018), rhythm guitar (2006–2018), clean vocals (2007–2009)
- Hannu(Bobo)Saarimaa – bass (2012–2018)

Former members

- Andre Rodriguez – drums (2013 USA tour drummer)
- Juuso Puhakka – scream vocals (2006–2009)
- Tuomo Korander – guitar (2006–2011)
- Jarkko Penttinen – bass (2006–2011)
- Teemu Leikas – drums (2006–2011)
- Tuomo(Tupi)Räisänen – guitar (2011–2013)
- Niko(Hoker Dine)Hyttinen – drums (2012–2013)
- Teemu(August)Pekkarinan – guitar (2013 US Tour)
- Dylan(Back Breaker)Broda – drums (2014–2016)
- Emil(The Wizard)Pohjalinen – guitar (2014–2016)

== Discography ==
Albums

- The Story of Kristy Killings (Sound of Finland, 2010)
- Featuring: Dr. Gruesome and the Gruesome Gory Horror Show (Victory Records, 2013)

EPs

- Drama Through Your Stereo EP (Poko Rekords, 2009)

Demos

- Snow White's Poison Bite (self-released, 2008)

Singles

- "So Cinderella" (2008)
- "She's a Trendy Designer on Her Wrists" (2009)
- "Valentine's Doom" (2010)
- "Kristy Killings" (2010)
- "The End of Prom Night" (2010)
- "Count Dracula Kid" (2012)
- "Gruesome Gory Horror Show" (2013)

== Videography ==
- "So Cinderella" (2008)
- "She's a Trendy Designer On Her Wrists" (2009)
- "The End of Prom Night" (2010)
- "Will You Meet Me in the Graveyard?" (2013)
- "There's a New Creep on the Block" (2013)
