= New Years Day (band) =

American rock band

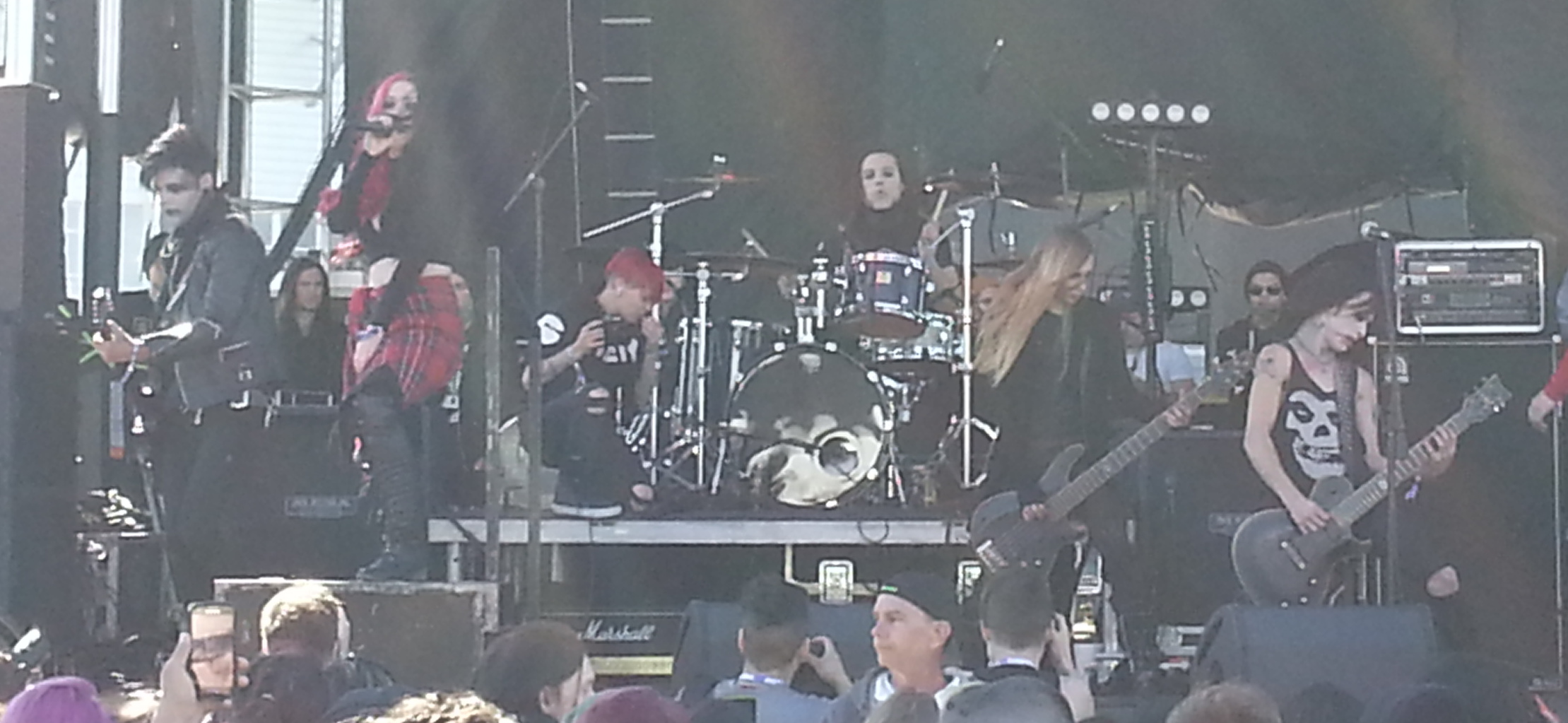
- New Years Day performing in 2016

Background information
- Origin: Anaheim, California, U.S.
- Genres: Alternative metal; gothic metal
- Years active: 2005–present
- Labels: Another Century; Grey Area; Century Media; Hollywood Waste; TVT
- Spinoff of: Home Grown; Wakefield
- Members: Ash Costello; Nikki Misery; Jeremy Valentyne; Brandon Wolfe; Tommy Rockoff
- Past members: Keith Drover; Mike Schoolden; Adam Lohrbach; Russell Dixon; Jake Jones; Anthony Barro; Matthew Lindblad; Tyler Burgess; Nick Rossi; Joshua Ingram; Zac Morris; Max Georgiev; Brian Sumwalt; Frankie Sil; Austin Ingerman; Trixx Daniel
- Website: nydrock.com

New Years Day is an American rock band formed in Anaheim, California, in 2005. After building a reputation strictly through promotion on the social networking website MySpace, the band released its debut self-titled EP in 2006 and their first full-length album My Dear in 2007. Six years after their initial debut, Victim to Villain was finally released, followed by Malevolence in 2015. Malevolence peaked at No. 45 on the Billboard 200, the band's highest charting thus far.

== History ==
=== 2005: Inception and formation ===
New Years Day formed in 2005, after bassist Adam Lohrbach left the band Home Grown. Lohrbach carried over the many emotional elements present in Home Grown's final 2004 EP When It All Comes Down and cultivated it into new material for New Years Day. Meeting with lead vocalist Ashley "Ash" Costello (born 1985) and guitarist/keyboardist Keith Drover, the three friends wrote and rehearsed songs about their difficult and emotional relationship break-ups. Soon after, the group produced a two-song demo and invited a mutual friend of the group, Eric Seilo, to play bass during their 2005 tours. Ultimately, Seilo left New Years Day at the end of 2005 to pursue higher education. After acquiring former Wakefield guitarist Mike Schoolden and drummer Russell Dixon, the group decided to call themselves New Years Day.

=== 2006–2010: Razor and My Dear ===
The band built a surprisingly strong online presence through showcasing, promotion and posting songs on MySpace. New Years Day was featured on the MySpace Records, Volume 1 compilation CD and on the video game soundtrack for Saints Row. After considering an offer from Pete Wentz's Decaydance Records label, the band decided to sign with TVT Records instead and released their first self-titled EP in 2006. Originally referred to as Razor, the EP was primarily marketed as a digital release accessible through downloading services, although CD hard copies were also sold to fans at live shows. New Years Day performed at the South by Southwest music festival the following year.

By May 8, 2007, New Years Day released its debut album My Dear, which was self-financed, self-produced and recorded over an eight-month period by friend and producer Eugene Perreras. The album included collaborations with members of Reel Big Fish and Motion City Soundtrack. During this period of time, the band toured with fellow artists, The Fall of Troy, The Red Jumpsuit Apparatus, Ozma and Hawthorne Heights. Guitarist Keith Drover left the band shortly after touring to move to Sweden. The band debuted the music video for the lead single "I Was Right", directed by Shane Drake. Notably, the video won the MTVU "Freshman Face" poll and was added to the channel's ongoing playlist.

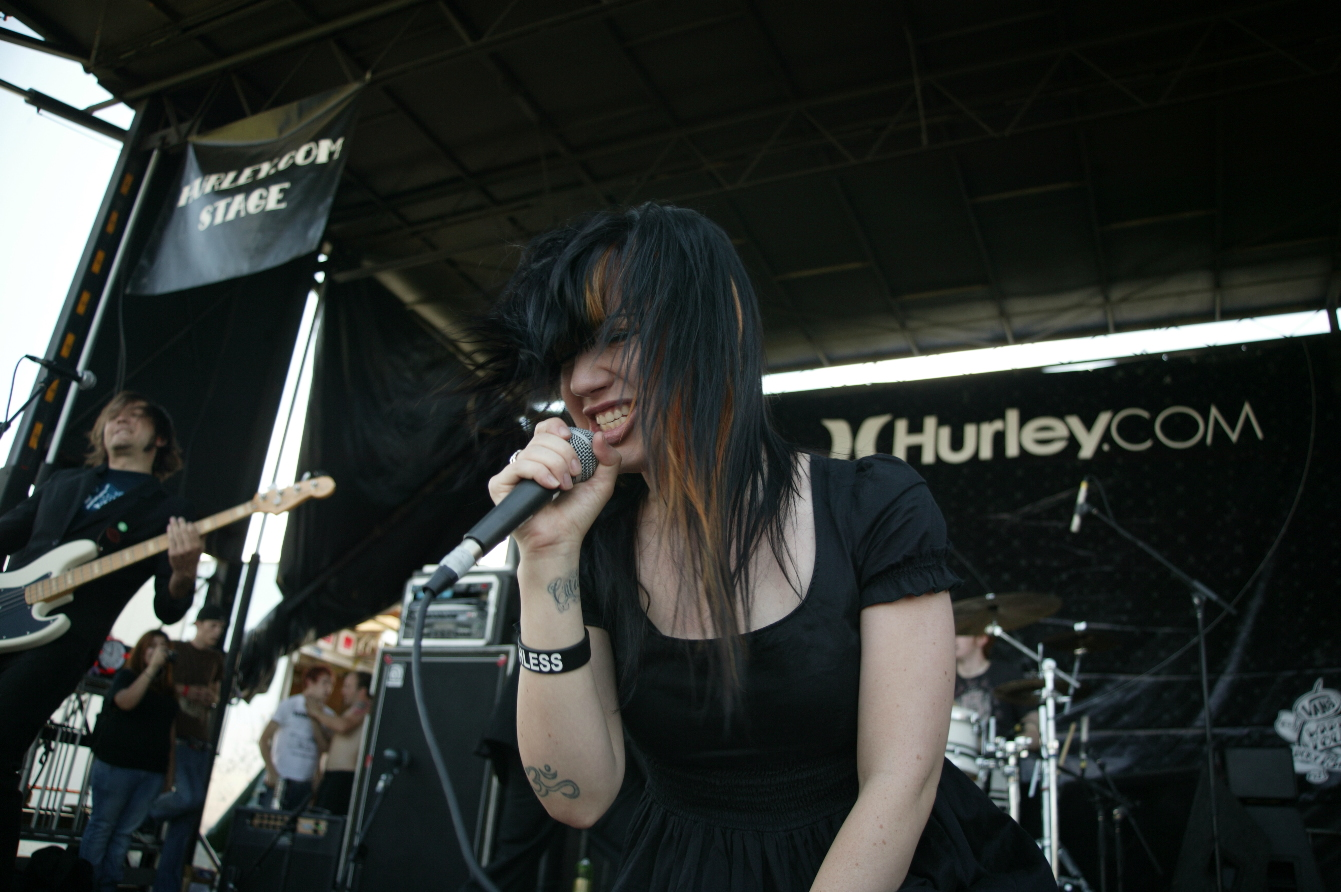
New Years Day in 2007

In 2008, TVT went bankrupt and was forced to sell its recording assets to The Orchard. Consequently, My Dear lacked the proper promotion required to succeed and Schoolden and Lohrbach both left the band shortly thereafter. Despite the small setbacks, the remaining members continued writing new material. Around September 2009, New Years Day posted two brand new songs on MySpace. When asked about the upcoming EP, Costello remarked, "The EP is in its demo phase right now and we are still writing for it and recording it at the same time. The EP should be out in the spring of 2010."

=== 2010–2012: Headlines & Headstones and The Mechanical Heart ===
On March 12, 2010, Alternative Press announced that New Years Day would be joining the 2010 Vans Warped Tour. On July 2, 2010, the band released its Japanese debut album, Headlines & Headstones under Spinning Inc. Headlines & Headstones included music from New Years Day, My Dear, new songs from their upcoming sophomore U.S. album and even a cover of Lady Gaga's Bad Romance.

New Years Day welcomed guitarist Matthew Lindblad as its newest member on January 31, 2011, replacing Dan Arnold. Soon after Lindblad joined, the band also brought in Jake Jones as an additional guitarist. On May 15, 2011, Hollywood Waste announced New Years Day as its newest addition to label. The band's EP, titled "The Mechanical Heart", was released on June 21, 2011.

From October to December, the band toured in support of Blood on the Dance Floor on the "All the Rage Tour". Nikki Misery joined the band on this tour as its lead guitarist, replacing Matthew Lindblad who pursued a solo career. Nikki Misery was a recent graduate of Musicians Institute, hailing from Santa Ana with roots in New Orleans.

=== 2013–2015: Victim to Villain and Epidemic ===
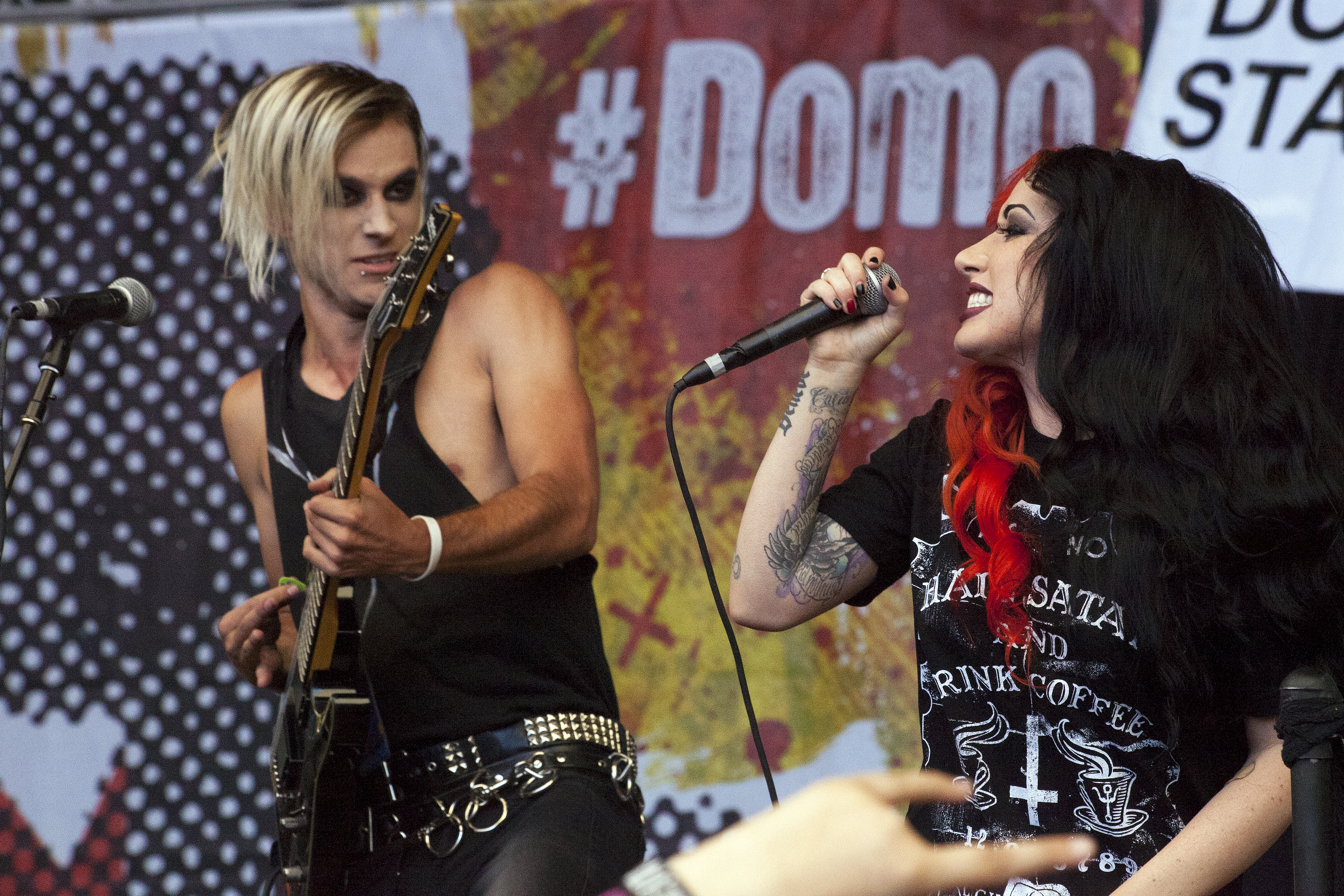
New Years Day in 2013

New Years Day released its second album Victim to Villain in June 2013 through Century Media Records. The band joined the 2013 Vans Warped Tour and performed 40 shows, "the longest-running touring music festival in North America" to this day. The band jumped on back-to-back tours with Otep and Stolen Babies in Fall 2013 and William Control and Combichrist in Spring 2014.

In early 2014, Nick Turner and Jake Jones left the band and were replaced by Nick Rossi and Tyler Burgess, respectively. New Years Day embarked on a European tour with Escape the Fate and Glamour of the Kill in the following months. The band parted ways with their previous label, Century Media Records and released of the first single off their upcoming Epidemic EP titled Other Side through Grey Area Records on November 18, 2014. When asked about the new EP, Costello commented in an Alternative Press interview, "We've taken what we have experienced in the past year and a half and poured it all into these new songs... It's something we know everyone can relate to on their own level. The world can infect us with its negativity, and it's okay to struggle with it. That's truly what Epidemic is about. Owning the diseased parts of us and turning it into a strength."

The band followed up the release of Epidemic on The Superstition Tour with Australian art rockers the Red Paintings. On December 22, 2014, the band made a special appearance on the "Beyond the Barricade Tour" with Motionless in White, For Today and Ice Nine Kills in Spring 2015. Just before the tour, Anthony Barro left the band to pursue a career in sound engineering and in turn, Burgess moved from guitar to fill the bass position. This transition opened the door for California native and metal songwriter Jeremy Valentyne to join the band on rhythm guitar.

=== 2015–2022: Malevolence and Unbreakable ===
In February 2015, New Years Day announced that it would once again play the Vans Warped Tour on the Journey's Left Foot Stage. The band performed at the tour's kickoff party in Los Angeles in April alongside Metro Station, Crossfaith and As It Is. Burgess left the band soon after the kickoff party, and Chris Khaos filled in for bass as a tour member.

In Fall of 2015, the band announced their third album, Malevolence and debuted the song "Kill or Be Killed" while on tour. The single was released on June 26, 2015.

On August 12, 2015, the band announced its first headlining tour: the Other Side Tour. Supporting bands on the tour included Get Scared, Eyes Set to Kill, the Relapse Symphony, and Darksiderz. On the eve of the album's release, New Years Day held a YouNow streaming chat with fans to celebrate the completion of Malevolence. During this chat, the band introduced Brandon Wolfe on bass and Daniel Trixx on drums.

In 2016, New Years Day covered the My Chemical Romance song "Sleep" for a Rock Sound tribute CD. After Wolfe's departure, Former Static-X member Frankie Sil was welcomed to the group as its new bassist. Trixx also left the band that same year and was replaced by Canadian rock drummer Joshua Ingram. In November 2016, the band embarked on "The Retrograde Tour" in support of Crown the Empire and Blessthefall.

The following year, New Years Day performed at the 2017 Alternative Press Music Awards (APMAs) with guest vocalist Lzzy Hale. The band also headlined the 2017 Vans Warped Tour alongside other main stage acts like Bowling for Soup, Falling in Reverse and CKY. On June 1, 2017, it was announced they would be included in the seventh installment of the Fearless Records compilation Punk Goes Pop, covering Kehlani's "Gangsta" from the movie Suicide Squad. The album was released on July 14, 2017. After completing a month-long festival run with Halestorm on the 2017 "Halloween Scream Tour", both Valentyne and Ingram quietly parted ways with the band. On January 26, 2018, the band released the EP Diary of a Creep with covers and original songs.

New Years Day embarked on the 2018 "Witching Hour Tour" in support of In This Moment alongside special guest, P.O.D.

On November 9, 2018, the band released a new single, "Skeletons," from their upcoming album Unbreakable, which was set to be released in early 2019. In early February 2019, Costello stated that Unbreakable's sound will be significantly heavier than Malevolence, and thematically, will focus more on empowerment, and less on the negativity and self-pity of past albums. On March 1, 2019, the band released the second single from the album, "Shut Up". The song peaked at number 17 on the Mainstream Rock Charts in May 2019. A third single, "Come For Me", was released on April 5, 2019. Unbreakable officially debuted on April 26, 2019.

At night two of WWE WrestleMania 37, New Years Day performed live Rhea Ripley's theme song Brutality as she made her entrance to the ring. Costello is the featured vocalist of the recorded song by CFO$. Shortly after, bassist Frankie Sil announced on his Instagram that he had left the band.

=== 2022–present: Return and Half Black Heart ===
On August 12, 2022, the band released their first new song in 3 years titled "Hurts Like Hell". this song also debuted a new lineup that features returning members Jeremy Valentyne and Brandon Wolfe on rhythm guitar and bass, Nikki Misery returning to lead guitar, and new member Tommy Rockoff on drums and vocals.

The band began night 1 of WWE’s NXT Halloween Havoc (October 24, 2023) with their song "Vampyre". On November 17, 2023, the band released the song "Secrets" and announced that their upcoming fifth album, Half Black Heart, will be released on March 1, 2024.

== Band members ==
=== Current ===
- Ash Costello – lead vocals (2005–present)
- Nikki Misery – lead guitar (2011–2018, 2018, 2022–present), rhythm guitar (2018–2022), bass (2016, 2021–2022), drums (2018–2022)
- Jeremy Valentyne – rhythm guitar (2015–2017, 2022–present), backing vocals (2015–2017, 2022–present), bass (2016)
- Brandon Wolfe – bass (2015–2016, 2022–present)
- Tommy Rockoff – drums, backing vocals (2022–2023, 2024–present)

=== Touring ===
- Longineu W. Parsons III − drums (2019–2021)

=== Former ===
- Eric Seilo – bass (2005)
- Adam Lohrbach – lead guitar (2005), bass (2005–2007), backing vocals (2005–2007)
- Keith Drover – rhythm guitar, keyboards, backing vocals (2005–2007)
- Russell Dixon – drums (2005–2013)
- Mike Schoolden – lead guitar, backing vocals (2005–2008)
- Dan Arnold – lead guitar (2007–2011)
- Mikey 13 – rhythm guitar (2007–2011)
- Anthony Barro – bass, unclean vocals (2007–2014)
- Matthew Lindblad – rhythm guitar, backing vocals (2011)
- Jake Jones – rhythm guitar (2011–2014)
- Nick Rossi – drums (2014–2015)
- Tyler Burgess – rhythm guitar (2014), bass, backing vocals (2014–2015)
- Chris Khaos – bass (2015; died 2024)
- Joshua Ingram – drums (2016–2018)
- Frankie Sil – bass (2016–2021)
- Zac Morris − drums (2018)
- Max Georgiev − lead guitar (2018)
- Brian Sumwalt − drums (2018)
- James Renshaw − drums (2018−2019)
- Austin Ingerman − lead guitar (2018−2022), bass (2021–2022)
- Trixx Daniel – drums (2015–2016, 2023–2024)

== Discography ==
=== Studio albums ===
Year	Title	Label	Peak chart positions
Year	Title	Label	US
2007	My Dear	TVT	—
2013	Victim to Villain	Century Media	—
2015	Malevolence	Another Century Records	45
2019	Unbreakable	Another Century Records	—
2024	Half Black Heart	Another Century Records	—

=== Extended plays ===
Year	Title	Label	Other information
2005	Demo	Self-produced	Released in 2005
2006	New Years Day/Razor	TVT	Released on November 29, 2006
2011	The Mechanical Heart	Hollywood Waste	Released on June 11, 2011
2014	Epidemic	Grey Area Records	Released on November 18, 2014
2018	Diary of a Creep	Century Media	Released on January 26, 2018

=== Compilations ===
Year	Title	Label	Other information
2005	MySpace Records, Vol. 1	MySpace Records	Released on November 1, 2005
2008	Beyond the Blue, Vol. 2	Kick Rock Records	Released on October 8, 2008 (Japan)
2010	Headlines and Headstones	Spinning Inc.	Released on July 2, 2010 (Japan)
2016	Metalhammers Decades of Destruction	Metalhammer	Cover of Marilyn Manson's "mOBSCENE"
2016	Rock Sound Presents: The Black Parade	Rock Sound	Cover of My Chemical Romance's "Sleep"
2017	Punk Goes Pop Vol. 7	Fearless Records	Cover of Kehlani's "Gangsta"

=== Singles ===
Year	Title	Peak chart positions	Album
Year	Title	US Main.	Album
2006	"Ready Aim Misfire"	×	My Dear
2007	"I Was Right"	×	My Dear
2013	"Do Your Worst"	×	Victim to Villain
2013	"I'm No Good"	×	Victim to Villain
2013	"Death of the Party"	×	Victim to Villain
2013	"Angel Eyes" (feat. Chris Motionless)	×	Victim to Villain
2014	"Other Side"	×	Epidemic
2014	"Epidemic"	×	Epidemic
2014	"Defame Me"	×	Epidemic/Malevolence
2015	"Kill or Be Killed"	×	Malevolence
2015	"Malevolence"	×	Malevolence
2016	"I'm About to Break You"	×	Malevolence
2017	"Gangsta" (Kehlani cover)	×	Punk Goes Pop Vol. 7
2018	"Disgust Me"	×	Diary of a Creep
2018	"Skeletons"	×	Unbreakable
2019	"Shut Up"	17	Unbreakable
2019	"Come for Me"	35	Unbreakable
2022	"Hurts Like Hell"	36	Half Black Heart
2023	"Vampyre"	31	Half Black Heart
2023	"Secrets"	—	Half Black Heart
2024	"I Still Believe"	—	Half Black Heart
2024	"Half Black Heart"	—	Half Black Heart

== Videography ==
=== Music videos ===
List of music videos, with year of release and video title
Year	Release	Title	Director(s)
2005	Demo	"Ready, Aim, Misfire"	Isaac Rentz
2007	My Dear	"I Was Right"	Shane Drake
2011	The Mechanical Heart	"Two in the Chest, One in the Head"	Kamell Allaway
2013	Victim to Villain	"Angel Eyes" (featuring Motionless in White's Chris Motionless)	Justin Lutsky
2014	Epidemic	"Other Side"	Anthony Barro
2014	Epidemic	"Defame Me"	Robyn August
2015	Malevolence	"Kill or Be Killed"	Robyn August
2015	Malevolence	"Malevolence"	Chad Michael Ward and Damien Lawson
2016	Malevolence	"I'm About to Break You"	Robyn August
2016	Malevolence	"Your Ghost" (Live)	Saint Raven
2017	Punk Goes Pop Vol. 7	"Gangsta"	Orie McGinness
2018	Diary of a Creep	"Disgust Me"	Orie McGinness
2019	Unbreakable	"Shut Up"	Galileo Mondol
2019	Unbreakable	"Come For Me"	Robyn August
2020	Unbreakable	"Skeletons"	Galileo Mondol & Ash Costello
2022	Half Black Heart	"Hurts Like Hell"	Robyn August
2023	Half Black Heart	"Vampyre"	Matteo Santoro
2024	Half Black Heart	"Half Black Heart" (Live)	Shawn Brandon
