= StandBy Records =

Standby Records
- Founded: 2007
- Founder: Neil Sheehan (2008-2020) Nick Moore (2006-2008)
- Genre: Indie Rock, Post-Hardcore, Alternative Rock
- Official website: standbyrecords.net

Standby Records was an independent record label originally from Ohio.

== Lawsuits ==
In 2016 Davey Suicide leaked to Alternative Press that the group had entered into a lawsuit with Standby Records. This prompted label-mates As Blood Runs Black to speak out against the label as well claiming financial issues. Suicide announced a few months after the leak that the group had come to a settlement with Standby Records.

== Former artists ==
- A Breach On Heaven (Active, Unsigned)
- As Blood Runs Black
- Black Veil Brides (Active, now with SpineFarm Records.)
- Blessed By A Burden (Active, Unsigned)
- Bruised But Not Broken (Inactive)
- Calembour
- Castle Grayskull (Disbanded 2010)
- Casta (Disbanded 2010)
- Cinema Sleep (Disbanded 2014)
- Chin Up, Kid (Active, now with We Are Triumphant Records)
- Come Clean
- Count Your Blessings (Disbanded 2011)
- Cvltvre (Active, Unsigned)
- Davey Suicide (Active, Unsigned)
- Demon in Me (Active, Unsigned)
- Destruction Of A Rose (Active, Unsigned)
- Dot Dot Curve :) (Active, Unsigned)
- Emarosa (Active, now with Out of Line Music.)
- Emergency 911 (Active, Unsigned)
- Fake the Attack (Disbanded 2016)
- Farewell, My Love (Active, now with CRCL Records)
- Freshman 15 (Active, Unsigned)
- Forever in Terror (Active, now with In-Demand Records.)
- Guns For Glory (Disbanded 2009)
- Handshakes And Highfives (Active, Unsigned)
- Hang Tight
- Holiday Unheard Of (Disbanded 2010/2011)
- Hopes Die Last (Disbanded 2017)
- I Fight Fail (Active, Unsigned)
- If Not for Me (Active, now with InVogue Records.)
- In Alcatraz 1962 (Disbanded 2013)
- I, The Dreamer
- It Comes in Waves (Active, Unsigned)
- Jesse Smith & The Holy Ghost
- Just Left (Active, Unsigned)
- Leaders And Kings
- Light the Fire
- Modern Day Escape (Active, Unsigned)
- The Nearly Deads (Active, Unsigned)
- No Bragging Rights (Active, now with Pure Noise Records.)
- Oh The Blood (Disbanded 2009)
- Offended By Everything
- NU-95 (Active, Unsigned)
- Outline In Color (Active, now with Thriller Records.)
- Picture Me Broken (Active, Unsigned)
- Pseudo Future (Active, Unsigned)
- The Relapse Symphony (Active, Unsigned)
- Return From Exile (Active, Unsigned)
- Secret Company
- Senseless Beauty (Active, Unsigned)
- Set to Reflect (Disbanded 2015)
- Settle the Sky (Disbanded 2010)
- Shot Down Stay Down (Active, Unsigned)
- Silence the Messenger (Disbanded 2016)
- Sink In (Active, Theoria Records)
- Southview (Active, Unsigned)
- Star City Meltdown (Active, Unsigned)
- Such Strange Arts (Disbanded 2016)
- Television Supervision
- Through The Ashes (Active, Unsigned)
- Tonight Is Glory (Active, Unsigned)
- Underlined (Active, Unsigned)
- Unimagined
- Vegas Masquerade (Disbanded 2011)
- Vice On Victory (Active, Unsigned)
- The Waking Life (Disbanded 2008)
- Whispers Of Wonder (Disbanded 2014)
- With A Kiss (Disbanded 2009)
- Younger Then
