= The Relapse Symphony =

- Origin: Washington D.C.
- Genres: Rock Pop Punk
- Years active: 2012–2016; 2018–present
- Labels: Standby Records
- Members: Bret Von Dehl; JC Charles; Jonny "The Jang" Fruitman; Casey Hannum; Chris Watters
- Past members: Tyler Gloyd; Brandon Kile; Alex Foxx; Ray Miller; D Vought
- Website: www.facebook.com/therelapsesymphony

The Relapse Symphony is an American rock band formed in Washington, D.C., in 2012. After gaining a social media presence and chatter about their debut, the band released its debut EP "Time's Running Out" in 2012 and their first full length album "Shadows" in 2014. Their latter album "Born to Burn" accompanied the announcement of their addition to Vans Warped Tour in 2015. Upon the completion of Vans Warped Tour, TRS completed two back to back tours, followed by an abrupt hiatus.

== History ==
The Relapse Symphony was originally formed in 2012 by Bret Von Dehl (vocals), JC Charles (guitar), Alex Foxx (guitar), Brandon Kile (bass), and Tyler Goyd (drums). They released their debut EP, "Time's Running Out", on December 4th of 2012 accompanied by a single and music video for "Panic! (Time's Running Out)" for promotion. Immediately spending the next two years touring and working on the follow-up full-length album. The band quickly rose in popularity with their lead singles “Make Your Move”, "Panic" and “The Other Side of Town”. The band went out on their first official tour in 2013 with "The Bad Blood" tour and gained much attention by combining inspiration from bands such as Green Day and Motley Crue.

In Jan 2013 the band announced a two night only show, opening for Black Veil Brides and William Control on the "Church of the Wild Ones" Tour.

On July 8, 2014 TRS released their debut album, "Shadows", via StandBy Records with music videos for "Savage Eyes" and "One More Yesterday" . During this time, the band had a lineup change and welcomed Ray Miller to the group along with Alex Foxx replacing Tyler Gloyd on Drums. This would be the lineup for their next tour, in which TRS would be direct support on The Dead Rabbitts’ - "The Shapeshiftour". Directly following "The Shapeshiftour", TRS joined the band as direct support to Eyes Set To Kill on their "Masks" Tour which was sponsored by Coldcock Whiskey.

In December 2014, the band released an Acoustic version of "Shadows", which would be the first release that Ray Miller would perform on. Bassist, Brandon Kile also left the band on amicable terms around this time and was replaced with temporary bassist Adam Peters.

On June 23, 2015, The Relapse Symphony released its second full-length album entitled: "Born to Burn". This album would be released via their label StandBy Records. Singles, "Die Alone" and "Tear Me Down" would be released with the album and would have accompanying music videos. During this time Alt Press Magazine would name The Relapse Symphony as one of the "100 Bands You Need To Know in 2015".

In the Summer of 2015, TRS announced that they would be a part of Vans Warped Tour from June 19-July 12. Shortly after the announcement, the bands lineup would again change with the departure of then-drummer Alex Foxx with substitute drummer Tommy Vinton on drums. This would be followed by the introduction of new bassist Daniel Vought and later, new drummer, Jonny "Jangy" Fruitman.

In March 2016 the band embarked on an East Coast run, which would also be their first headlining tour, titled "Rock N' Roll Warriors" tour. After a successful tour, TRS left on a West Coast tour in direct support of Wednesday 13, but an exhausted TRS would later return home for a musical hiatus.

In the fall of 2018, the band responded to fan's unrelenting curiosity about the band's future with a headlining reunion concert at Jammin' Java in Vienna, Virginia. After the success of the reunion, the band released an additional single in Feb 2020 titled "Left Turns in New Jersey" and since had a further lineup change with the departure of Ray Miller and the introduction of Casey Hannum of Guitar.

== Band members ==
- Bret Von Dehl - Vocals (2012–present)
- JC Charles - Guitar (2012–present)
- Jonny "Jangy" Fruitman - Drums (2016–present)
- Casey Hannum - Guitar (present)
- Chris Watters - Bass (2018–present)

Ex-members

- Brandon Kile - Bass (2012-2014)
- Tyler Gloyd - Drums (2012-2014)
- Alex Foxx - Guitar/Drums (2012-2015)
- Tommy Roulette Vinton - Drums (2015) (Current vocalist of "Jynx")
- Ray Miller - Guitar (2014 - 2018)
- Daniel "D" Vought - Bass (2016)

== Discography ==
Studio albums

- Shadows (2014)
- Born to Burn (2015)

EPs

- 2012 - Time's Running Out

Singles

- 2013 - Make Your Move
- 2013 - Burning Bridges
- 2013 - Panic (Time's Running Out!)
- 2014 - We Are The Broken
- 2014 - One More Yesterday
- 2014 - Savage Eyes
- 2014 - Forever Slowly
- 2014 - The Ghost That Got Away (Acoustic)
- 2015 - Shadows (Acoustic)
- 2015 - One More Yesterday (Acoustic)
- 2015 - A Perfect Lie
- 2015 - Die Alone
- 2015 - Born To Burn
- 2015 - Tear Me Down

Music Videos

- 2013 - Panic! (Time's Running Out)
- 2014 - One More Yesterday
- 2014 - Savage Eyes
- 2015 - One More Yesterday (Acoustic)
- 2015 - Die Alone
- 2015 - Tear Me Down
- 2015 - Born To Burn
