= Aftershock Festival =

Annual rock music festival in Sacramento, California

- Aftershock 2014 line-up
- Genre: Hard rock, heavy metal, punk
- Dates: September/October
- Locations: Discovery Park, Sacramento, California
- Years active: 2012–2019, 2021–present
- Website: Aftershock Festival official website

The Aftershock Festival is a rock music festival in Sacramento, California, started in 2012.

== History ==
In 2019, the festival expanded to three days, and in 2021, Aftershock expanded to four days, from October 7 to 10.

In 2022, Aftershock attracted an estimated 160,000 fans to the festival.

== Aftershock 2012 ==
Aftershock 2012 – September 23, 2012

- Stone Temple Pilots
- Deftones
- Bush
- Chevelle
- Theory of a Deadman
- Escape the Fate
- Hollywood Undead
- Oleander
- Hell or Highwater
- Otherwise
- Stepchild
- Gemini Syndrome
- Beware of Darkness
- Fallrise

== Aftershock 2013 ==
Aftershock 2013 – September 14–15, 2013

Day 1, Saturday September 14:

Monster Energy Main Stage North

- Shinedown
- Papa Roach
- Skillet
- P.O.D.
- In This Moment
- We as Human

Monster Energy Main Stage South

- Korn
- Megadeth
- Buckcherry
- Testament
- Steel Panther
- Otherwise

Ernie Ball Stage

- Love and Death
- Heaven's Basement
- Butcher Babies
- Eye Empire
- Girl On Fire
- Nothing More

Day 2, Sunday September 15:

Monster Energy Main Stage North

- Avenged Sevenfold
- A Day to Remember
- Halestorm
- Asking Alexandria
- Falling in Reverse
- Gemini Syndrome

Monster Energy Main Stage South

- Five Finger Death Punch
- Volbeat
- HIM
- All That Remains
- Airbourne
- Hell or Highwater

Ernie Ball Stage

- Filter
- Pop Evil
- SOiL
- Thousand Foot Krutch
- Miss May I

== Aftershock 2014 ==
Day 1 - September 13, 2014

Monster Energy Main Stage West

- Limp Bizkit
- Tech N9ne
- Black Label Society
- Hellyeah
- Memphis May Fire
- Anti-Mortem

Monster Energy Main Stage North

- Weezer (headliner)
- AWOLNATION
- Bad Religion
- Pepper
- Dead Sara
- The Last Internationale

Monster Energy Main Stage South

- The Offspring (co-headliner)
- Chevelle
- Nothing More
- Fuel
- Sleepwave
- Islander

Coors Light Stage

- Butcher Babies
- Emmure
- Eyes Set to Kill
- Viza
- Dig the Kid

Day 2 - September 14, 2014

Monster Energy Main Stage West

- Godsmack (headliner)
- Seether
- Theory of a Deadman
- Black Stone Cherry
- We Are Harlot
- Escape the Fate

Monster Energy Main Stage North

- Rob Zombie (co-headliner)
- Rise Against
- Pennywise
- Of Mice & Men
- Atreyu
- Otherwise

Monster Energy Main Stage South

- Five Finger Death Punch
- Mastodon
- Buckcherry
- We Came as Romans
- Kyng
- Young Guns

Coors Light Stage

- Lacuna Coil
- Unlocking the Truth
- New Medicine
- Burn Halo
- Fallrise

== Aftershock 2015 ==
Day 1 - October 24, 2015

Monster Energy Main Stage North

- Slipknot (headliner)
- Bring Me the Horizon
- Black Veil Brides
- Pop Evil
- Suicidal Tendencies
- Turbowolf

Monster Energy Main Stage South

- Shinedown (co-headliner)
- Breaking Benjamin
- Hollywood Undead
- Helmet
- Art of Dying
- Snot

Monster Energy Main Stage East

- Marilyn Manson
- Seether
- P.O.D.
- All That Remains
- Red Sun Rising
- Devour the Day

Coors Light Stage

- Clutch
- Beartooth
- Hell or Highwater
- September Mourning
- RavenEye

Day 2 - October 25, 2015

Monster Energy Main Stage North

- Faith No More (headliner)
- Coheed and Cambria
- All Time Low
- Sleeping with Sirens
- Issues
- ONE OK ROCK

Monster Energy Main Stage South

- Deftones (co-headliner)
- Death from Above 1979
- Eagles of Death Metal
- Failure
- Highly Suspect
- Pink Slips
- Death Rogen

Monster Energy Main Stage East

- Jane's Addiction
- Stone Temple Pilots ft. Chester Bennington
- Yelawolf
- Sevendust
- The Sword
- Neck Deep

Coors Light Stage

- Glassjaw
- Red Fang
- Madchild
- '68
- Dance Gavin Dance

== Aftershock 2016 ==
Day 1 - October 22, 2016

Monster Energy Stage

- Tool
- Primus
- The Pretty Reckless
- Baroness
- Avatar
- Whores.
- American Sharks

Discovery Stage

- Slayer
- Meshuggah
- Anthrax
- Motionless in White
- letlive.
- Big Jesus

Capital Stage

- Deafheaven
- Face to Face
- Drakulas
- The Shrine
- Æges
- Death Angel

Day 2 - October 23, 2016

Monster Energy Stage

- Avenged Sevenfold
- Disturbed
- Chevelle
- Parkway Drive
- Silver Snakes
- The Mendenhall Experiment

Discovery Stage

- Korn
- Puscifer
- Ghost
- The Amity Affliction
- Ignite

Capital Stage

- Zakk Sabbath
- Max and Igor Cavalera return to Roots
- Suicide Silence
- Whitechapel
- Some Fear None

== Aftershock 2017 ==
Day 1 - Saturday, October 21, 2017

Monster Energy Stage

- Nine Inch Nails (headliner)
- Run the Jewels
- Stone Sour
- Eagles of Death Metal
- Nothing More
- Greta Van Fleet
- Palaye Royale

Blackcraft Stage

- A Perfect Circle (co-headliner)
- Mastodon
- Gojira
- Highly Suspect
- Anti-Flag
- Deap Vally

Capital Stage

- Tech N9ne
- August Burns Red
- Code Orange
- He Is Legend
- Joyous Wolf

Tour poster for the 2017 Aftershock Festival.

Day 2 - Sunday, October 22, 2017

Monster Energy Stage

- Ozzy Osbourne (headliner)
- Halestorm
- Of Mice & Men
- Beartooth
- Butcher Babies
- New Years Day

Blackcraft Stage

- Five Finger Death Punch (co-headliner)
- In This Moment
- Hollywood Undead
- Suicidal Tendencies
- Starset
- Black Map

Capital Stage

- Steel Panther
- Fozzy
- Power Trip
- DED
- Them Evils

Cancellations

- Marilyn Manson (due to an onstage injury sustained a few weeks prior)
- Frank Carter & The Rattlesnakes

== Aftershock 2018 ==
Day 1 - Saturday, October 13, 2018

Monster Energy Stage

- Deftones (headliner)
- 311
- Action Bronson
- Jonathan Davis
- Sevendust
- Red Sun Rising
- Dirty Honey

Discovery Stage (Presented by Cyco Flower)

- Godsmack (co-headliner)
- Shinedown
- Underoath
- Asking Alexandria
- The Vinnie Paul Tribute
- Hyro Da Hero
- Viza

Capital Stage (Presented by Kolas)

- Gwar
- Monster Magnet
- Emmure
- Stick to Your Guns
- Wage War
- The Dose
- Provoker

Day 2 - Sunday, October 14, 2018

Monster Energy Stage

- System of a Down (headliner)
- Incubus
- At the Drive-In
- Bullet for My Valentine
- Dorothy
- Amigo the Devil

Discovery Stage (Presented by Cyco Flower)

- Alice in Chains (co-headliner)
- Slash feat. Myles Kennedy & The Conspirators
- Seether
- Black Veil Brides
- Dance Gavin Dance
- LAW

Capital Stage (Presented by Kolas)

- Everlast
- The Fever 333
- Plague Vendor
- All Them Witches
- Slothrust
- The Jacks

Cancellations

- Hellyeah (cancelled due to Vinnie Paul's death)
- Bad Wolves (cancelled)

== Aftershock 2019 ==
Day 1 - Friday, October 11, 2019

Monster Energy Stage

- Slipknot (headliner)
- Lamb of God
- Dropkick Murphys
- I Prevail
- Philip H. Anselmo & the Illegals

Kolas Discovery Stage

- Staind
- Halestorm
- Clutch
- Beartooth
- Motionless in White
- Ded

Coors Capital Stage

- Sum 41
- The Interrupters
- Knocked Loose
- Angel Du$t
- The Pink Slips
- Santa Cruz

Day 2 - Saturday, October 12, 2019

Monster Energy Stage

- blink-182 (headliner)
- Bring Me the Horizon
- Stone Temple Pilots
- Highly Suspect
- Fishbone
- The Parlor Mob
- Dead Posey

Kolas Discovery Stage

- Rob Zombie
- Marilyn Manson
- Bad Religion
- Ghostemane
- Badflower
- Sick Puppies

COORS CAPITAL STAGE

- Fidlar
- Andrew W.K.
- Health
- Ho99o9
- Spirit Adrift

Day 3 - Sunday, October 13, 2019

Monster Energy Stage

- Tool (headliner)
- A Day to Remember
- Gojira
- The Crystal Method
- Brkn Love
- Blue Midnight

Kolas Discovery Stage

- Korn
- Chevelle
- Babymetal
- Falling in Reverse
- New Language

Coors Capital Stage

- Deadland Ritual
- Fu Manchu
- Fire from the Gods
- The Hu
- Evan Konrad

Cancellations and no shows

- Poppy (no show)
- While She Sleeps (cancelled)
- Broken Hands (cancelled)
- Joyous Wolf (cancelled)
- Architects (cancelled)
- Frank Carter & The Rattlesnakes (cancelled)

== Aftershock 2021 ==
Previously in 2020, it was postponed until 2021 due to the COVID-19 pandemic. Danny Wimmer Presents announced because of the unfortunate events a Thursday night was added for free for anyone who purchased their tickets in advance.

Day 1 - Thursday, October 7, 2021

Kolas Stage

- Cypress Hill (headliner)
- Anthrax
- Knocked Loose
- Destroy Boys

Coors Light Stage

- Testament
- Exodus
- Death Angel
- Oxymorrons

Day 2 - Friday, October 8, 2021

Jack Daniel's Stage

- Metallica (headliner)
- Rancid
- Dropkick Murphys
- Avatar
- Des Rocs
- Ayron Jones

Kolas Stage

- Volbeat
- Seether
- Skillet
- Pop Evil
- Crobot

Coors Light Stage

- Suicidal Tendencies
- Butcher Babies
- Cleopatrick
- Black Map
- Unity TX
- Contracult Collective

Day 3 - Saturday, October 9, 2021

Jack Daniel's Stage

- Mudvayne
- Gojira
- Atreyu
- August Burns Red
- Ded
- The Black Moods

Kolas Stage

- The Original Misfits (headliner)
- The Offspring
- Machine Gun Kelly
- Badflower
- Bones UK
- Blame My Youth

Coors Light Stage

- Body Count
- Anti-Flag
- Alien Weaponry
- South of Eden
- Another Day Dawns
- American Teeth

Day 4- Sunday, October 10, 2021

Jack Daniel's Stage

- Metallica (headliner)
- Social Distortion
- Pennywise
- Black Veil Brides
- Mammoth WVH
- The Blue Stones

Kolas Stage

- Rise Against
- Mastodon
- In This Moment
- Steel Panther
- Law

Coors Light Stage

- Yelawolf
- Grandson
- All Good Things
- The Cold Stares
- Widow 7

Cancellations

- My Chemical Romance (cancelled)
- Limp Bizkit (cancelled)
- Faith No More (cancelled due to Mike Patton's mental health issues)
- From Ashes to New (cancelled)
- Parkway Drive
- Fit for a King
- Live
- Hatebreed

== Aftershock 2022 ==
Day 1 - Thursday, October 6, 2022

Jack Daniel's Stage

- Slipknot (headliner)
- Evanescence
- Killswitch Engage
- Nothing More
- Crown the Empire
- Vended

Kolas Stage

- Rob Zombie
- Stone Temple Pilots
- Ghostemane
- Ice Nine Kills
- Dead Sara
- Solence

DW Presents Stage

- Code Orange
- Royal & the Serpent
- POORSTACY
- Fit For An Autopsy
- Superbloom

Coors Light Stage

- Bad Religion
- Alexisonfire
- Cherry Bombs
- PRONG
- Taipei Houston
- Ego Kill Talent

Day 2 - Friday, October 7, 2022

Jack Daniel's Stage

- Kiss (headliner)
- Danzig
- Falling in Reverse
- Clutch
- Spiritbox
- AEIR

Kolas Stage

- Lamb of God
- Chevelle
- Motionless in White
- Jeris Johnson
- Joey Valence & Brae
- Orbit Culture

DW Presents Stage

- Gwar
- Apocalyptica
- Nemophila
- Set It Off
- For The Better

Coors Light Stage

- Meshuggah
- In Flames
- Helmet
- Mike's Dead
- Archetypes Collide
- Hot Crazy

Day 3 - Saturday, October 8, 2022

Jack Daniel's Stage

- My Chemical Romance (headliner)
- A Day to Remember
- Yungblud
- Beartooth
- Thursday
- Lilith Czar

Kolas Stage

- Papa Roach
- Halestorm
- Theory of a Deadman
- Thrice
- Airbourne
- Eva Under Fire

DW Presents Stage

- The Emo Night Tour
- L.S. Dunes
- Enter Shikari
- Zeal & Ardor
- Point North
- Crooked Teeth

Coors Light Stage

- City Morgue
- Ho99o9
- The Chats
- Mothica
- Trash Boat
- As You Were

Day 4 - Sunday, October 9, 2022

Jack Daniel's Stage

- Muse (headliner)
- Bring Me the Horizon
- The Pretty Reckless
- The Struts
- Dirty Honey
- New Years Day

Kolas Stage

- Shinedown
- Black Label Society
- The Interrupters
- Underoath
- The Warning
- Maggie Lindemann

DW Presents Stage

- Bayside
- Carolesdaughter
- Classless Act
- Jared James Nichols
- Bloodywood
- Heartsick

Coors Light Stage

- Action Bronson
- Amigo The Devil
- Band-Maid
- The Alive
- The Bobby Lees

Cancellations

- Foo Fighters (headliner)
- Jelly Roll

== Aftershock 2023 ==
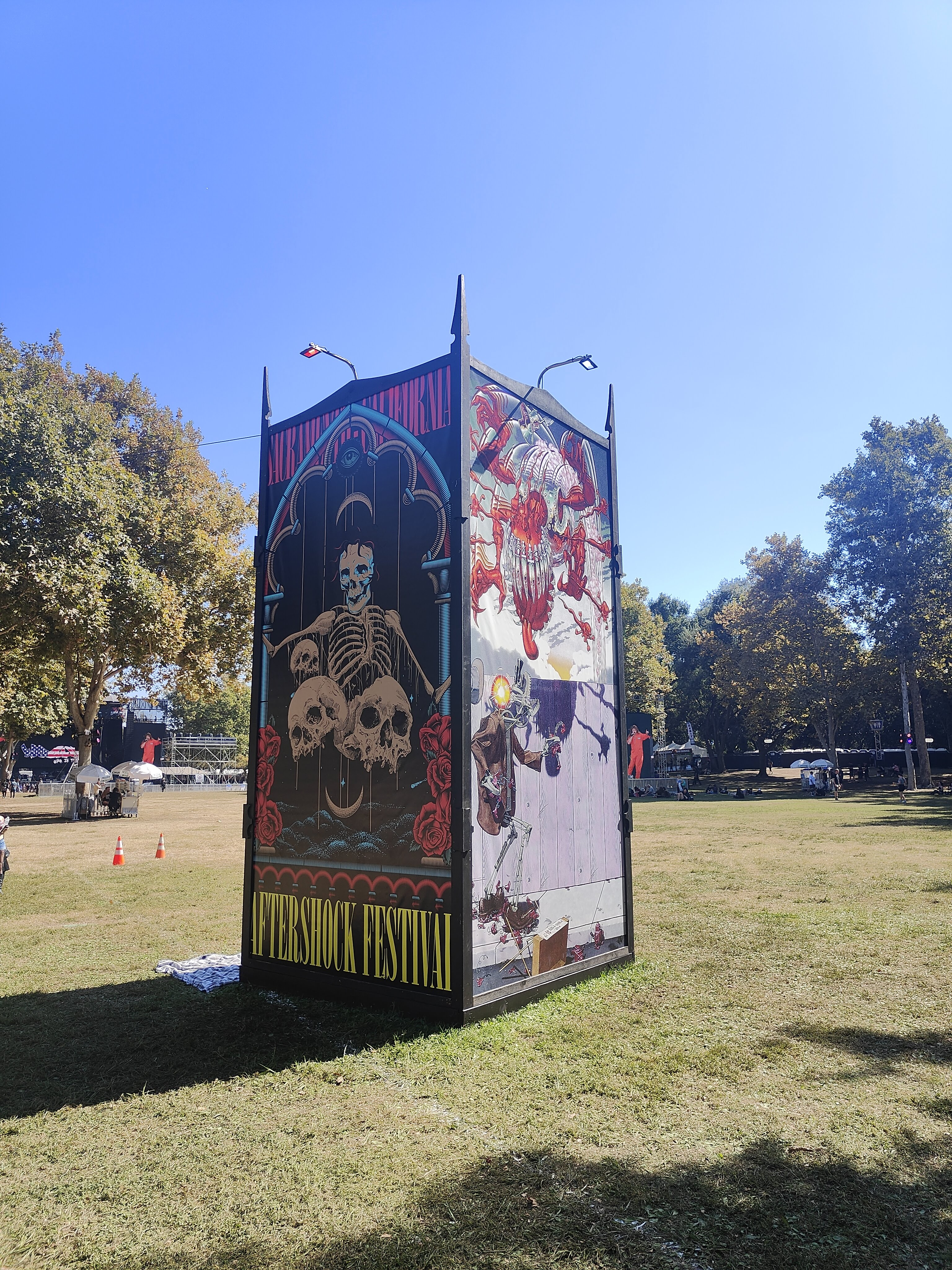
Aftershock 2023 mural.

Aftershock 2023 took place during a week of high temperatures and hydration stations were provided to festival goers. Pantera pulled out of the festival due to "circumstances beyond our control", being replaced by Stone Temple Pilots. Prior to Aftershock, Corey Taylor injured his leg during a show in Los Angeles and also pulled out of the festival. Members of his touring group were also having difficulties with Covid-19.

Day 1 - Thursday, October 5, 2023

Jack Daniel's Stage

- Avenged Sevenfold (headliner)
- The Cult
- Stone Temple Pilots
- Nothing but Thieves
- Don Broco
- Pinkshift

Shockwave Stage

- Incubus
- AFI
- Pennywise
- White Reaper
- Nothing,Nowhere
- Holding Absence

Coors Light Stage

- L7
- The Bronx
- Beauty School Dropout
- Thousand Below
- Starbenders
- Letdown.

DW Presents Stage

- Senses Fail
- DeathbyRomy
- Kim Dracula
- Kid Kapichi
- Static Dress
- SeeYouSpaceCowboy

Day 2 - Friday, October 6, 2023

Jack Daniel's Stage

- Tool (headliner)
- Limp Bizkit
- Coheed & Cambria
- Skillet
- Memphis May Fire
- Strange Kids

Shockwave Stage

- Godsmack
- Megadeth
- Bad Omens
- The Hu
- Fire From the Gods
- Flat Black

Coors Light Stage

- Converge
- Attila
- Gideon
- Dragged Under
- Hanabie.
- Death Valley Dreams

DW Presents Stage

- Nu Metal Night
- Deafheaven
- Polaris
- Currents
- Varials
- Tallah
- Widow7

Day 3 - Saturday, October 7, 2023

Jack Daniel's Stage

- Korn (headliner)
- 311
- Fever 333
- Escape the Fate
- Fame on Fire
- Reddstar

Shockwave Stage

- Turnstile
- Parkway Drive
- Babymetal
- Avatar
- Boston Manor

Coors Light Stage

- Dethklok
- The Amity Affliction
- Sueco
- Ten56.
- Ithaca
- Traitors
- Amber Wild

DW Presents Stage

- Imperial Tide
- Polyphia
- Sleep Token
- Catch Your Breath
- Holy Wars
- Fox Lake
- Luna Aura

Day 4 - Sunday, October 8, 2023

Jack Daniel's Stage

- Guns N' Roses (headliner)
- Rancid
- I Prevail
- Badflower
- Ayron Jones
- Wargasm

Shockwave Stage

- Queens of the Stone Age
- Dance Gavin Dance
- Daughtry
- Mayday Parade
- Rain City Drive
- Austin Meade

Coors Light Stage

- Suicide Silence
- Movements
- Ryan Oakes
- Tigercub
- Redlight King
- Asava

DW Presents Stage

- Billy Talent
- Call Me Karizma
- Jehnny Beth
- Devil's Cut
- Gnome
- As You Were

Cancellations

- Pantera
- Corey Taylor
- DeathByRomy
- Bob Vylan
- Rain City Drive
- Reddstar
- '68
- Devil's Cut
- All Waves
- You Me At Six
- Dead Poet Society

== Aftershock 2024 ==
Aftershock 2024 saw the introduction of a new fifth stage, allowing an additional 30 bands to perform on the festival lineup. Approximately 160,000 people were in attendance for the festival weekend.

Day 1 - Thursday, October 10, 2024

Jack Daniel's Stage

- Slayer (headliner)
- Till Lindemann
- Ministry
- Filter
- Hawthorne Heights
- Adema
- Like A Storm

Shockwave Stage

- Pantera
- Halestorm
- Cypress Hill
- Sevendust
- Orgy
- Tim Montana
- Reach NYC

Coors Light Stage

- Grandson
- Drain
- Drug Church
- Gel
- Teen Mortgage
- Return to Dust (band)

DW Presents Stage

- Static-X
- Biohazard
- Better Lovers
- The Armed
- Jeris Johnson
- Stratejacket

Soundwave Stage

- Insane Clown Posse
- Ho99o9
- Descartes a Kant
- TX2
- Silly Goose

Day 2 - Friday, October 11, 2024

Jack Daniel's Stage

- Slipknot (headliner)
- Evanescence
- Dropkick Murphys
- Highly Suspect
- The Warning
- Giovannie and the Hired Guns
- Brutis

Shockwave Stage

- Five Finger Death Punch
- Rise Against
- Architects
- Poppy
- Lilith Czar
- Dead Poet Society
- Vended

Coors Light Stage

- Mastodon
- Juliette and the Licks
- Marky Ramone
- Taproot
- Soul Glo
- Budderside

DW Presents Stage

- Daron Malakian and Scars on Broadway
- L.S. Dunes
- Joey Valence & Brae
- Zulu
- Winona Fighter
- Local H
- Royale Lynn

Soundwave Stage

- We Came as Romans
- Bayside
- D.R.U.G.S.
- Moonshine Bandits
- Hemorage
- Capital Theatre
- As You Were

Day 3 - Saturday, October 12, 2024

Jack Daniel's Stage

- Iron Maiden (headliner)
- Breaking Benjamin
- Anthrax
- Sleeping with Sirens
- P.O.D.
- New Years Day
- CKY

Shockwave Stage

- Judas Priest
- Staind
- Clutch
- Dope
- Rival Sons
- Alien Ant Farm
- Jigsaw Youth

Coors Light Stage

- Lorna Shore
- Kublai Khan TX
- Whitechapel
- Show Me The Body
- Ill Niño
- Nerv
- CZYK

DW Presents Stage

- Body Count
- Fugitive
- Militare Gun
- High Vis
- Holy Fawn
- Damnage
- The Funeral Portrait

Soundwave Stage

- Tech N9ne
- Saosin
- Bad Wolves
- Any Given Sin
- Convictions
- Deadlands

Day 4 - Sunday, October 13, 2024

Jack Daniel's Stage

- Mötley Crüe (headliner)
- Falling In Reverse
- Skillet
- Badflower
- Jinjer
- Oxymorrons
- Point North

Shockwave Stage

- Disturbed
- Seether
- Nothing More
- Eagles of Death Metal
- From Ashes to New
- Drowning Pool
- Hed PE

Coors Light Stage

- Flogging Molly
- Pup
- Set It Off
- Citizen Soldier
- Holding Absence
- Caskets
- Lowlives

DW Presents Stage

- Tom Morello
- Resorte
- Touché Amoré
- Bob Vylan
- Powerman 5000
- Mike's Dead
- Black Map

Soundwave Stage

- Shadows Fall
- Fear Factory
- Narrow Head
- Slothrust
- Blame My Youth
- Jager Bonham
- Gozu

Cancellations

- The Chisel
- Coal Chamber
- Lo Spirit
- Self Deception
- Veil of Maya (hiatus)

== Aftershock 2025 ==
Crowds attending Aftershock 2025 faced muddy conditions due to on-and-off rainy weather all throughout the weekend. The Jack Daniel's stage was renamed to the Aftershock stage to better reflect the festival's branding, and the Soundwave stage from the previous year was removed due to concerns about congestion and noise interference.

Day 1 - Thursday, October 2, 2025

Aftershock Stage

- Blink-182 (Headliner)
- All Time Low
- Taking Back Sunday
- Alkaline Trio
- State Champs
- Hoobastank
- The Ataris

Shockwave Stage

- Good Charlotte
- The All-American Rejects
- Hollywood Undead
- Mom Jeans
- Bowling for Soup
- The Red Jumpsuit Apparatus
- Hot Milk

Coors Light Stage

- Acid Bath
- Testament
- Carcass
- High on Fire
- Cattle Decapitation
- Nails
- Snot
- Dry Kill Logic

DW Presents Stage

- Hatebreed
- All Shall Perish
- Chelsea Grin
- Speed
- Attila
- Thrown
- Left to Suffer

Day 2 - Friday, October 3, 2025

Aftershock Stage

- Deftones (Headliner)
- Turnstile
- Knocked Loose
- The Dillinger Escape Plan
- Basement
- Failure
- Glare
- Quannnic

Shockwave Stage

- A Perfect Circle
- Lamb of God
- Bruce Dickinson
- Kerry King
- Fear Factory
- Lacuna Coil
- Winds of Plague

Coors Light Stage

- Dream Theater
- Power Trip
- Exodus
- Alestorm
- Yngwie Malmsteen
- Death Angel
- Gloryhammer
- Forbidden

DW Presents Stage

- Chiodos
- Of Mice & Men
- Get Scared
- Northlane
- Landmvrks
- Violent Vira
- 156/Silence

Day 3 - Saturday, October 4, 2025

Aftershock Stage

- Korn (Headliner)
- Gojira
- Chevelle
- Slaughter to Prevail
- Bilmuri
- Saliva
- Nonpoint

Shockwave Stage

- Bad Omens
- Three Days Grace
- Trivium
- Dayseeker
- Kittie
- Memphis May Fire
- Scary Kids Scaring Kids

Coors Light Stage

- Powerwolf
- DragonForce
- August Burns Red
- Imminence
- Dying Fetus
- Demon Hunter
- Seven Hours After Violet
- Born of Osiris

DW Presents Stage

- Sunami
- Trash Talk
- Scowl
- Dying Wish
- Xibalba
- Snuffed on Sight

Day 4 - Sunday, October 5, 2025

Aftershock Stage

- Bring Me the Horizon (Headliner)
- Marilyn Manson
- Motionless in White
- Black Veil Brides
- Story of the Year
- The Plot in You
- Sleep Theory

Shockwave Stage

- Rob Zombie
- Mudvayne
- In This Moment
- Machine Head
- Static-X
- Spineshank
- Dope

Coors Light Stage

- Flyleaf w/ Lacey Sturm
- Pop Evil
- Hinder
- Crossfade
- Sick Puppies
- Rev Theory
- 12 Stones
- Return to Dust

DW Presents Stage

- Cavalera Conspiracy
- Gwar
- DevilDriver
- Chimaira
- 3 Inches of Blood
- Prong
- Five Headed Cobra

== Aftershock 2026 ==
Aftershock 2026 returned to the five stage setup from 2024, with a separate area for the fifth stage - The Point - to the west of the Jiboom Street bridge to help reduce crowd congestion and sound interference. The Coors Light and DWP stages were renamed Faultline and Epicenter respectively to better fit the festival branding, with the latter being setup beneath the I-5 freeway overpasses. An estimated record-breaking 180,000 people attended the festival amidst dusty conditions and near-record high temperatures caused by a historic super El Niño event.

Day 1 - Thursday, October 1, 2026

Aftershock Stage

- My Chemical Romance (Headliner)
- Sublime
- Hot Mulligan
- Mayday Parade
- We the Kings
- Lit
- Free Throw

Shockwave Stage

- The Offspring
- The Used
- The Starting Line
- Hawthorne Heights
- L.S. Dunes
- Leap

The Point Stage

- The Pretty Reckless
- Nothing More
- Theory of a Deadman
- Apocalyptica
- Finger Eleven
- Red
- The Violent Hour

Faultline Stage

- Killswitch Engage
- Sevendust
- Coal Chamber
- The Union Underground
- Ill Niño
- Ünloco
- Brujeria
- Primer 55

Epicenter Stage

- Starset
- From Ashes to New
- Holding Absence
- Caskets
- The Word Alive
- Wind Walkers

Day 2 - Friday, October 2, 2026

Aftershock Stage

- Limp Bizkit (Headliner)
- Wu-Tang Clan
- Public Enemy
- Cypress Hill
- Insane Clown Posse
- P.O.D.
- Drowning Pool
- Silly Goose

Shockwave Stage

- Suicideboys
- Slaughter to Prevail
- Three 6 Mafia
- Kublai Khan TX
- Drain
- Haywire 617
- Haarper

The Point Stage

- Coheed and Cambria
- Underoath
- Alexisonfire
- Senses Fail
- Atreyu
- Finch
- Alesana
- Eyes Set to Kill

Faultline Stage

- Dethklok
- Chad Gray
- Cradle of Filth
- Blue Medusa
- Nekrogoblikon
- Psychostick
- Vianova
- Traverse the Abyss

Epicenter Stage

- Paleface Swiss
- The Black Dahlia Murder
- Spite
- Bodysnatcher
- PeelingFlesh
- Rivers of Nihil

Day 3 - Saturday, October 3, 2026

Aftershock Stage

- Pierce the Veil (Headliner)
- Babymetal
- Sleeping with Sirens
- Chiodos
- Set It Off
- Blessthefall
- Ivri
- Fear, and Loathing in Las Vegas

Shockwave Stage

- A Day to Remember
- The Story So Far
- Wage War
- The Wonder Years
- The Devil Wears Prada
- Escape the Fate
- Austin Carlile

The Point Stage

- Black Label Society
- Down
- Corrosion of Conformity
- Kylesa
- Melvins
- Pentagram
- Doobie

Faultline Stage

- Circa Survive
- La Dispute
- Thursday
- Saosin
- Armor for Sleep
- Horse the Band
- Emery
- The Fall of Troy

Epicenter Stage

- The Ghost Inside
- Counterparts
- After the Burial
- The Acacia Strain
- Stick to Your Guns
- Gideon

Day 4 - Sunday, October 4, 2026

Aftershock Stage

- Tool (Headliner)
- Danny Elfman
- AFI
- Zakk Sabbath
- Buckethead
- Helmet
- CKY

Shockwave Stage

- Queens of the Stone Age
- Stone Temple Pilots
- Highly Suspect
- Filter
- Oleander
- Toadies

The Point Stage

- Body Count
- Suicidal Tendencies
- Cavalera
- Soulfly
- Municipal Waste
- Cro-Mags
- Codefendants

Faultline Stage

- Dance Gavin Dance
- The Home Team
- From First to Last
- Hail the Sun
- I See Stars
- Drop Dead, Gorgeous
- Emarosa
- I Set My Friends on Fire

Epicenter Stage

- Sleep Theory
- President
- Jutes
- Holywatr
- The Pretty Wild
- Ladrones

Cancellations

- Cenobia
- New Found Glory (cancelled due to death of Chad Gilbert)
- Wolfmother

== See also ==
- Ozzfest
- Uproar Festival
- Mayhem Festival
