= Conviction (Aiden album) =

Studio album by Aiden
- Released: August 20, 2007
- Recorded: May 2007
- Studio: Robert Lang (Shoreline, Washington)
- Genres: Pop rock, pop-punk
- Length: 37:17
- Label: Victory
- Producer: John Goodmanson

Aiden chronology
Rain in Hell (2006)	Conviction (2007)	Knives (2009)

Singles from Conviction
- 1. "One Love" Released: September 11, 2007; 2. "Moment" Released: March 18, 2008

Conviction is the third studio album by American rock band Aiden, released on August 20, 2007 by record label Victory. The album was produced by John Goodmanson and exhibits a lighter, more melodic musical style for the band.

Conviction reached number 54 in the US Billboard 200 chart, whilst receiving a generally negative reaction from music critics.

== Recording and composition ==
On January 15, 2007, the band began pre-production, which lasted into mid-February. By this point, the band had 14 songs written. Francis revealed that the album would be "our biggest and most ambitious record to date." From mid-February to early April, the band participated in the Taste of Chaos tour. Following this, further pre-production took place at Sleepy Hollow Studios in Day Creek, Washington. These sessions were done with Dave Schiffman, who was assisted by Robert Bicknell II. In May, Conviction was recorded at Robert Lang Studios in Seattle, Washington with producer John Goodmanson. He was assisted by John Ziemski and Jeff Gall. Goodmanson mixed the recordings at Robert Lang Studios, before they were mastered by Troy Glessner at Spectre Mastering. Efrem Schulz of Death by Stereo provides additional vocals on "Son of Lies".

AllMusic noted a "considerable Cure influence" in the album's songs, specifically "One Love". The album has marked a completely different musical direction for the band, departing from the punk rock sound from their first two albums for a lighter sound. Speaking to Kerrang! in 2009, frontman Wil Francis explained:

Every record that we've done, being the main songwriter for the band, has been a reflection of what's going on in my personal life. So yeah, Nightmare was pissed but by the time we did Conviction I'd achieved so many of the things that I've always dreamed of doing: walking out on the main stage of the Warped Tour, playing all summer long with NOFX, touring with HIM, played Download in front of 50,000 people. With Conviction I wasn't pissed. I wasn't angry and that came through in the music. I was a bit bummed that some Aiden fans turned away from it because I was a little bit more melodic or a little bit different from what they had been expecting from us but I don't sit down and think, 'If I write this it will sell bucketloads' because I wouldn't be able to sleep at night thinking that way.

== Release ==
In early June, the group performed at Download Festival in the UK. In July and August, the band went on a West Coast tour alongside From Autumn to Ashes, I Am Ghost and Night Kills the Day. "One Love" was made available for streaming on July 23. "Teenage Queen" was made available for streaming on August 8. On August 14, a trailer was posted for the music video for "One Love".

Conviction was released August 21 through Victory Records. The album's artwork was created by artist Alex Pardee. Best Buy editions of the album included two bonus tracks: "Here Lies the Waste" and "So Far Away". On September 11, "One Love" was released as a single in the UK. Digital version included "Here Lies the Waste" and "So Far Away" as B-sides, while the 7" vinyl version included "Here Lies the Waste" as the B-side. In September and October, the group went on a headlining tour of the US with support from Drop Dead, Gorgeous, Still Remains and 1997. Also in October, the band toured Australia and New Zealand as part of the Taste of Chaos Down Under tour.

From late January to late March 2008, the band embarked on the World by Storm Tour across the US. On various parts of the tour, the band was supported by Madina Lake, Schoolyard Heroes, My American Heart and Farewell to Freeway and Ivoryline. "Moment" was released to radio on March 18. On May 22, it was announced that guitarist Jake Wambold had left the band. In November and December, the band went on a tour of the US alongside Civet and God or Julie.

== Reception ==
Professional ratings
Review scores
Source	Rating
AllMusic	3/5 stars
Drowned in Sound	1/10
Punknews.org	1.5/5 stars
Spin	Mixed

The album has been one of the band's most commercially successful albums to date, whilst receiving a generally negative reaction from critics.

A particularly negative review came from Drowned in Sound, describing it as "a worn-out collection of plodding, heard-it-all-before tunes".

== Track listing ==
All songs written and composted by Aiden.

No.	Title	Length
1.	"The Opening Departure"	2:00
2.	"She Will Love You"	4:21
3.	"Teenage Queen"	3:26
4.	"Hurt Me"	3:26
5.	"One Love"	3:27
6.	"Moment"	3:46
7.	"Darkness"	3:51
8.	"Son of Lies"	3:22
9.	"Believe"	3:09
10.	"Bliss"	3:20
11.	"The Sky Is Falling"	3:07

Best Buy bonus tracks
No.	Title	Length
12.	"Here Lies the Waste"	3:08
13.	"So Far Away"	3:21

== Personnel ==
Personnel per booklet.

Aiden

- Nick Wiggins – bass guitar
- Jake Davison – drums
- Angel Ibarra – lead guitar
- Jake Wambold – rhythm guitar
- Wil Francis – vocals

Additional musician

- Efrem Schulz – additional vocals (track 8)

Production

- John Goodmanson – producer, mixing
- John Ziemski – assistant
- Jeff Gall – second assistant
- Troy Glessner – mastering
- Dave Schiffman – pre-production
- Robert Bicknell II – assistant
- Alex Pardee – artwork
- Lisa Johnson – photography

== Chart positions ==
Chart	Position
US Billboard 200	54
US Independent Albums	5
US Rock Albums	15
US Hard Rock Albums	6
US Alternative Albums	15
