= Knives (album) =

Studio album by Aiden
- Released: May 12, 2009
- Recorded: January 2009
- Genre: Horror punk, melodic hardcore
- Length: 34:59
- Label: Victory
- Producer: Aiden, Justin Armstrong

Aiden chronology
Conviction (2007)	Knives (2009)	From Hell... with Love (2010)

Professional ratings
Review scores
Source	Rating
411mania	8.5/10 stars
AbsolutePunk.net	46%
AllMusic	3/5 stars
Alternative Press	3.5/5 stars
Kerrang!	4/5 stars
Rocksound	7/10 stars
ZME Music	2/10 stars

Knives is the fourth studio album by American punk rock band Aiden.

== Recording and composition ==
On January 15, 2009, it was announced that the band had begun recording their next album. It was recorded and produced by WiL at his own studio, Sleepy Hollow, in Seattle. The album is a return to Aiden's horror punk style, after the lighter style of the album Conviction.

== Release ==
On March 14, 2009, Knives was announced for release in May. On April 1, "Scavengers of the Damned" was announced as the first single from the album and was made available to buy on iTunes as well as uploaded to the band's MySpace page. The album was released on May 11 in the UK and a day later in the US through Victory Records. The band has described this album as, "raw, it's fast, it's pissed". Between late June and late August, the band performed on the Warped Tour.

== Track listing ==
No.	Title	Length
1.	"Killing Machine"	2:25
2.	"Let the Right One In"	3:02
3.	"Scavengers of the Damned"	2:43
4.	"Elizabeth"	2:28
5.	"Crusifiction"	2:42
6.	"The Asylum"	2:47
7.	"Portrait" (Poem read by Ryann Donnelly)	1:38
8.	"Excommunicate"	2:36
9.	"King on Holiday"	1:59
10.	"Black Market Hell" (includes a live version of "Lori Meyers" by NOFX as a hidden track)	12:39
Total length:		34:59

Best Buy bonus tracks
No.	Title	Length
11.	"Black Market Hell" (Demo)	2:13
12.	"King on Holiday" (Demo)	1:59
13.	"Elizabeth" (Demo)	2:27
14.	"Let the Right One In" (Demo)	3:09

== Personnel ==
Aiden

- Wil Francis – vocals, production, engineering, mixing, collage art
- Angel Ibarra – guitars, production
- Nick Wiggins – bass guitar, production
- Jake Davison – drums, production

Production and additional personnel

- Justin Armstrong – production, engineering, mixing
- Ryann Donnelly – backing vocals; vocals (on "Portrait")
- Rick Kern – backing vocals
- Jeremy Beddingfield – backing vocals
- Anna Ivarra – backing vocals, photography
- Chad Michael Ward – artwork
- Doublej – artwork
- Michael Cortada – logo

== Chart positions ==
Chart	Position
US Billboard 200	95
US Top Independent Albums	12
US Top Rock Albums	30
US Top Alternative Albums	24
