= Some Kind of Hate =

Studio album by Aiden
- Released: October 25, 2011
- Recorded: 2011
- Genre: Horror punk, melodic hardcore
- Length: 28:46
- Label: Victory, Riot!
- Producer: William Control

Aiden chronology
Disguises (2011)	Some Kind of Hate (2011)	Aiden (2015)

Singles from Some Kind of Hate
- 1. "Broken Bones" Released: October 11, 2011

Professional ratings
Review scores
Source	Rating
AllMusic	3/5 stars
Alternative Press	3.5/5 stars
Under the Gun Review	9.5/10
Rock Sound	6/10

Some Kind of Hate is the sixth studio album by American rock band Aiden. It was released on October 25, 2011, and is the follow-up to the album Disguises, which was also released in 2011. It is the last album by Aiden released on record label Victory, and is the last album to feature guitarist Angel Ibarra and bassist Nick Wiggins. This album is known for being produced the same year as Disguises, and as the album that finalized their contract with Victory Records and allowing them to be released from the label.

== Promotion and release ==
One single, "Broken Bones", was released. A short clip of this song was previewed on September 15, 2011 via the Victory Records YouTube profile. On October 8, a full lyric video was released for this song on the same YouTube profile, and later the official music video premiered on YouTube. The video consists of frontman Wil Francis taking a young man on a nightmarish journey through a haunted house.

On October 21, 2011, the band participated in a listening party of the album. It was hosted by Francis on the website Ustream.

The song "There Will Be Blood" was used as the official theme song of Total Nonstop Action Wrestling Pay-per-view Genesis 2012.

== Track listing ==
All tracks are written by William Control, except when stated otherwise.

No.	Title	Writer(s)	Length
1.	"There Will Be Blood"		3:38
2.	"Broken Bones"		3:06
3.	"Irony in the Shadows"		2:26
4.	"London Dungeon" (Misfits cover)	Glenn Danzig	3:17
5.	"Deactivate"		3:25
6.	"Grotesque Vanity"		1:40
7.	"Transmission" (Joy Division cover)	Bernard Sumner, Peter Hook, Stephen Morris	3:13
8.	"Freedom from Religion"		1:58
9.	"The Courage to Carry On"		2:17
10.	"In the End"		3:46
Total length:			28:46

== Personnel ==
Aiden

- Wil Francis – vocals, piano, guitars, production, engineering, mixing
- Angel Ibarra – guitars, backing vocals
- Nick Wiggins – bass guitar, backing vocals
- Mike “Ratboy” Novak – drums

Production and additional personnel

- Justin Armstrong – mixing
- Jeremy Beddingfield – backing vocals
- Jake Davison – backing vocals
- Austin Held – backing vocals
- Rick Kern – backing vocals
- Harry Macdonald – backing vocals
- Daniel Matson – backing vocals
- Nicholas McMahan – backing vocals
- Roya Nourani – backing vocals
- Allana Smith – backing vocals
- Jamie Wheelock – backing vocals
- Doublej – layout design
- Aaron Edge – artwork
- Jeremy Saffer – band photo
