= Dead Silence =

2007 film by James Wan

- Theatrical release poster
- Directed by: James Wan
- Screenplay by: Leigh Whannell
- Story by: James Wan; Leigh Whannell
- Produced by: Gregg Hoffman; Oren Koules; Mark Burg
- Starring: Ryan Kwanten; Amber Valletta; Donnie Wahlberg; Bob Gunton
- Cinematography: John R. Leonetti
- Edited by: Michael N. Knue
- Music by: Charlie Clouser
- Production company: Universal Pictures
- Distributed by: Universal Pictures
- Release date: March 16, 2007
- Running time: 89 minutes
- Country: United States
- Language: English
- Budget: $20 million
- Box office: $22.4 million

Dead Silence is a 2007 American supernatural horror film directed by James Wan and written by Leigh Whannell. It stars Ryan Kwanten, Amber Valletta, Donnie Wahlberg, and Bob Gunton. The film follows Jamie Ashen (Kwanten), a young widower returning to his hometown to search for answers to his wife's mysterious death.

Dead Silence was released in the United States on March 16, 2007. It grossed $22 million on a $20 million budget and received negative reviews from critics.

== Plot ==
Jamie Ashen and his wife Lisa receive an anonymous gift: a ventriloquist doll called "Billy" (Billy #57). When Jamie goes out, a figure kills Lisa. Jamie returns to find his wife dead with her tongue cut off. He is arrested and interrogated by police detective Jim Lipton, but later released due to a lack of evidence. Inside Billy's box, Jamie finds a mysterious message about "Mary Shaw", a deceased ventriloquist from his hometown, Raven's Fair.

Returning to Raven's Fair, now old and rundown, Jamie visits his estranged, disabled father Edward and his much-younger wife, Ella. He arranges for Lisa's funeral with the help of local mortician Henry Walker. Henry's senile wife, Marion, urges him to bury Billy. Jamie does so but is confronted by Lipton, who finds his actions suspicious.

Henry explains that Mary Shaw was publicly humiliated by a young boy named Michael, who rudely claimed to see her lips moving during one of her performances. Later, after Michael disappeared, his family blamed it on Mary and lynched her. Mary's last wish was to have her body turned into a doll and buried with her collection of dolls - her "children." Henry, then a child, saw Mary (after she was turned into a dummy) rise up, but was spared thanks to his silence, because Mary only kills those who scream when exposed to her true appearance. Jamie finds out that Michael, who actually was murdered by Mary, was his great-uncle Michael Ashen. The Ashen family forced Mary to scream and silenced her by cutting her tongue out; she has since been seeking revenge against their bloodline by killing them the same way.

Mary kills Henry, and Lipton discovers that all of her dolls have been dug up. At Mary's old theater, Jamie and Lipton discover 100 of the dolls in their display case but the glass container containing Billy is empty (As it was delivered to Jamie Ashen) which reveals that it wasn't Jamie that put Billy in his home, Along with Michael's body, which had been turned into a marionette. Mary's ghost appears controlling a clown doll, and reveals that she killed Lisa because she was pregnant with his child, thereby killing any potential newborn of the Ashen family. After shooting the doll, Jamie and Lipton start a fire to destroy the other dolls that Mary Shaw is attempting to possess. As the two of them flee, Mary Shaw follows them, and the catwalk that Lipton and Jamie run across breaks, causing Lipton to fall and scream. As he falls, he is pulled behind the stage curtain and killed, while Jamie falls into the basement and escapes the theater. Back at his father's residence, Jamie is confronted by Mary, but repels her by throwing Billy into the fireplace. He learns, much to his horror, that his father is already dead; the current "Edward" he has been interacting with all this time is a doll converted from his corpse; his voice was provided by Ella, the "perfect doll" that Mary created before her death. Jamie screams as Ella becomes possessed by Mary; he suffers the same fate as everyone else.

Mary flips through a photo album of her victims: Jamie, Lisa, Lipton, Henry and Edward, and finally Ella. She closes the book, having completed her revenge.

== Cast ==
- Ryan Kwanten as Jamie Ashen
- Amber Valletta as Ella Ashen
- Donnie Wahlberg as Detective Jim Lipton
- Bob Gunton as Edward Ashen
- Michael Fairman as Henry Walker
  - Keir Gilchrist as Young Henry Walker
- Joan Heney as Marion Walker
- Laura Regan as Lisa Ashen
- Judith Roberts as Mary Shaw
- Steven Taylor as Michael Ashen
- Dmitry Chepovetsky as Richard Walker
- Shelley Peterson as Lisa's Mom
- Enn Reitel as Billy (voice)
- Fred Tatasciore as the Clown Doll (voice)
- Susan Silo as Elderly lady (voice)
- Julian Richings as Boz (uncredited)

== Production ==
Filming took place in Toronto, Ontario, Canada in October 2005 and concluded May 2006 The setting for the film's story, the non-fictional suburb of "Raven's Fair," is situated at Badley Bridge and goes by the name "Raven's Fair Town Sign".

== Release ==
Dead Silence was released in the United States on March 16, 2007.

== Reception ==
=== Box office ===
In the United States, as of April 16, 2007, the film's total domestic gross has been worth US$16.8 million (according to Box Office Mojo), and screenings of Dead Silence were ceased in most theatres 16 days following its release; the film's estimated production budget was US$20 million. As of April 1, 2009, US$5,572,971 has been generated globally. Worldwide, the film has grossed $22,382,047.

=== Critical reception ===
On Rotten Tomatoes, the film has a rating of 21%, based on 84 reviews, with an average rating of 3.90/10. The site's critical consensus reads, "More tasteful than recent slasher flicks, but Dead Silence is undone by boring characters, bland dialogue, and an unnecessary and obvious twist ending." On Metacritic, the film holds a score of 34 out of 100, based on 15 reviews, indicating "generally unfavorable" reviews. Audiences polled by CinemaScore gave the film an average grade of "C+" on an A+ to F scale.

Nicholas Barber of The Independent gave a positive review, describing the film as "a ludicrous ghost story from the Saw team", while stating: "Dead Silence is a guilty pleasure, especially if you have a gottle of geer beforehand."

In a negative review, Peter Bradshaw of The Guardian gave the film a 2 stars out of 5 and wrote: "The first horrifying death that the dummy causes is genuinely pretty scary, though from then on, the story deflates a little, returning to its former power only with the final revelation about Jamie's disabled father, who holds the key to these terrible deaths. A reasonable shocker." Charles Kassady Jr. of Common Sense Media gave the same rating and wrote: "Some of the scary stuff is just fleeting glimpses of Mary's ghost, reflected in a mirror or in deep shadow. Dead Silence actually gets less frightening when the filmmakers apply the fancy CGI special-effects or reveal Mary Shaw in full. It's far more ominous just to show the dummy's staring eyes or grinning face suddenly turned in a different position than the last shot."

Despite the initial negative reception, the film garnered a cult following. Cody Parish of PopMatters said it's "unlike anything Wan has made."

=== Home video ===
The film was released on DVD and HD DVD on June 26, 2007, with an "unrated" version also released. The film has since grossed US$17,304,718 in overall DVD sales.

Dead Silence was released on Blu-ray Disc internationally in 2010 and wasn't released on Blu-ray in the United States until 2015, when it was announced on May 15 that Universal Studios would be releasing the film to Blu-ray Disc in the U.S. It was released on August 11.

== Soundtrack ==
Dead Silence Soundtrack

Soundtrack album by Charlie Clouser, Aiden
- Released: March 16, 2007
- Genres: Score, horror punk, Gothic rock
- Length: 51:19
- Label: Lakeshore Records
- Producers: Charlie Clouser, Aiden

Charlie Clouser, Aiden chronology
Saw III (2006)	Dead Silence Soundtrack (2007)	Saw IV (2007)

Singles from Dead Silence
- 1. "We Sleep Forever" Released: March 2007 (Rain in Hell)

Lakeshore Records released the soundtrack of Dead Silence on March 20, 2007. The CD contains 31 tracks, the first track being the song "We Sleep Forever" performed by American rock band Aiden (despite not actually being featured in the film itself). The rest of the CD is taken up by Charlie Clouser's film score. Clouser previously scored Wan's first commercially released film, Saw and its many sequels.

Track listing

1. "We Sleep Forever" – Aiden
2. "Main Titles" [2:56]
3. "Sheet" [1:08]
4. "Blood" [1:41]
5. "Apartment" [1:28]
6. "Raven's Fair" [0:59]
7. "Dad's House" [0:47]
8. "Ella" [1:29]
9. "My Son" [1:03]
10. "What Poem?" [1:31]
11. "Caskets" [1:57]
12. "Motel Hearse" [1:22]
13. "It Can't Be" [1:40]
14. "Funeral" [0:49]
15. "Billy" [2:42]
16. "Perplexed" [1:25]
17. "Steal Billy" [0:50]
18. "Lips Moving" [1:57]
19. "Coffin" [2:16]
20. "Photos" [1:36]
21. "Map Drive" [0:49]
22. "Guignol" [1:57]
23. "He Talked" [3:06]
24. "It's Soup" [2:09]
25. "Full Tank" [1:49]
26. "Doll Wall" [1:37]
27. "All the Dolls" [1:07]
28. "One Left" [0:27]
29. "Mary Shaw" [0:31]
30. "Dummy" [1:05]
31. "Family Album" [0:37]

== Post-release commentary ==
In his personal blog, screenwriter Leigh Whannell reveals the origins of the film within the context of the Hollywood film industry. In a candid post entitled "Dud Silence: The Hellish Experience of Making a Bad Horror Film", Whannell explains that the film was conceived following the advice of his agent at the time and that a "script doctor" was eventually employed by the production studio. Whannell concludes the post with a description of the key lessons that were learned following the Dead Silence experience:

After everything is said and done, I'm almost glad Dead Silence happened, because it gave me an extreme, coal-face lesson in what not to do. It was like learning to swim by leaping off Niagara Falls. I only write scripts on spec now, which means that I write them in my own time without getting paid and then take them out into the world to see if anyone's interested. Never again will I enter the arranged marriage of selling a pitch. I have also become very gun-shy about working with studios. In the world of independent film, what you write ends up on screen. Plus, they don't have the money to bring in script doctors! Works fine for me. Who knows, maybe one day I will work with a studio again...

In retrospect, director James Wan said: "Dead Silence, my second movie and first studio film, was really me responding to the reaction that Saw was getting, meaning that people were harping on the torture aspect of Saw. So I made a very conscious decision to move away from that style of film and into something that was more of a haunted house, ghost story, which is a genre I love. But, of course, Saw made such a strong impression that it carried into Dead Silence. A lot of people were expecting something similar to Saw, but it wasn't. Ultimately, it didn't do that well, financially, and at the time, people didn't really like it. But now, strangely, so many fans reach out to tell me how much they love Dead Silence."
