= Nick Wiggins =

Zombie Nicholas
- Born: Nicholas Wiggins; February 8, 1984 (age 42)
- Origin: Seattle, Washington, USA
- Genres: Post-hardcore, hardcore punk, alternative rock, horror rock
- Occupations: Songwriter, guitarist, bassist
- Instruments: Guitar, vocals bass guitar
- Member of: Girl On Fire
- Formerly of: Me Vs Myself, Aiden, William Control

Nicholas Wiggins (born February 8, 1984), also known by the stage name Zombie Nicholas, is an American rock musician. He is best known for his time as the bassist and backing vocalist for the horror punk band Aiden from 2003 until 2015. He is also a member of the supergroup Me Vs. Myself with Carson Allen of On the Last Day and played bass for William Control's live band from 2008 to 2012. Most recently, he has been the rhythm guitarist of the hard rock band Girl On Fire, who released their debut album Not Broken in 2013. He lives in Seattle, Washington.

== Discography ==
=== Aiden ===
- Our Gangs Dark Oath (2004)
- Nightmare Anatomy (2005)
- Conviction (2007)
- Knives (2009)
- From Hell With Love: Luciforever (2010)
- Disguises (2011)

=== EPs ===
- A Split of Nightmares - Split EP with Stalin's War (2004)
- Rain in Hell (2006)

=== William Control ===
- Hate Culture (October 28, 2008)
- Noir (June 8, 2010)

=== Me Vs Myself ===
- Seasons EP (2010)
- Where I Am... Where I Want To Be (2012)

== Equipment ==
Nick uses:

- Gretsch Guitars
- Gibson Guitars
- Marshall JMP Head
- Marshall Cabs
- Fender P-Bass
- Fender Jazz Bass
- Ernie Ball Music Man Bass
- Ampeg Classic Head
- Ampeg 8x10 Bass Cab
