= Girl On Fire (band) =

American musical group

- Origin: Seattle, Washington, U.S.
- Years active: 2007–2015
- Labels: Hollywood Waste Records (2010–2012); Century Media Records (2012-2014)
- Members: Austin Held; Nick Wiggins; Josh Mouser; Nick McMahan; Harry MacDonald
- Past members: Brent McGaughey
- Website: girlonfiremusic.com

Girl On Fire was a Seattle-based rock band formed in 2007. The band consisted of vocalist Austin Held, guitarists Nick McMahan and Nicholas Wiggins, bassist Josh Mouser and drummer Harry MacDonald. Girl On Fire began receiving national attention with the release of their debut record Not Broken on Century Media Records. Their album debuted at No. 25 on Billboard's Heatseekers chart. They toured with such acts as Buckcherry, Halestorm, Pop Evil, and Filter.

== History ==
=== 2007–2010: Early years ===
Formed in the summer of 2007, Girl On Fire was founded by members Austin Held, guitarist Nick McMahan, guitarist Brent McGaughey, bassist Josh Mouser, and drummer Harry MacDonald. That same year, the band recorded a series of demos and began playing heavily around the Seattle area. The band first saw minor exposure upon winning the Ernie Ball Battle of the bands in 2008 and in 2009, after which Brent McGaughey chose to leave the band.

=== 2010–2012: Hollywood Waste and Revenge EP ===
In late 2010, Girl On Fire signed a deal with Hollywood Waste Records (an imprint of Century Media Records). The band spent the early part of 2011 writing and recording the Revenge EP with Wil Francis (Aiden, William Control). 2011–12 saw the band on national tours with Get Scared, Rev Theory and Burn Halo, in support of their Revenge EP.

=== 2013–2015: Century Media and Not Broken ===
In 2012, Girl On Fire were up-signed to Century Media Records and began writing their first full-length record. The band spent the last part of 2012 at NRG Studios recording Not Broken with producer Jay Baumgardner (Papa Roach, Evanescence). The record was released on September 3, 2013, and debuted at No. 25 on Billboard Heatseekers charts. Their first single, "The Takedown", spent four weeks in the top 50 and peaked at No. 44. "The Takedown" has been featured on ESPN and was included on Apple Music's playlist of top bands influenced by Linkin Park. The song has over five million plays on Spotify.

The band spent the majority of 2013 on the road with the likes of: Pop Evil, Filter, Otherwise and Nothing More, as well as a three-month stint with Buckcherry. They also performed at several national rock festivals, including Aftershock, Rockville, and Fort Rock.

2014 saw the band headlining shows at the famous Whisky a Go Go and The Viper Room on Hollywood's Sunset Strip. On September 23, 2014, the band released a music video for their second single, "Reminds Me of You". In November, the band embarked upon their first national headlining tour with Los Angeles band Raw Fabrics.

The band continued to tour nationally in 2015. Notable stints included, a sold out show at the Hard Rock Seattle, a date on the famous SXSW festival, and a headlining spot at Seattle Hempfest 2015. The band's final show was September 5 at the Showare center, alongside Seattle band Candlebox

Several members are currently in the pop rock band Pretty Awkward (Sony Music).

== Band members ==
- Austin Held - vocals
- Nick McMahan - lead guitar
- Nick Wiggins - rhythm guitar
- Josh Mouser - bass
- Harry MacDonald - drums

== Discography ==
| Year | Album | Billboard Heatseekers chart |
|---|---|---|
| 2011 | Revenge EP | — |
| 2013 | Not Broken | 25 |
| 2023 | Welcome Home EP | — |
