= Gnome (band) =

Belgian rock band

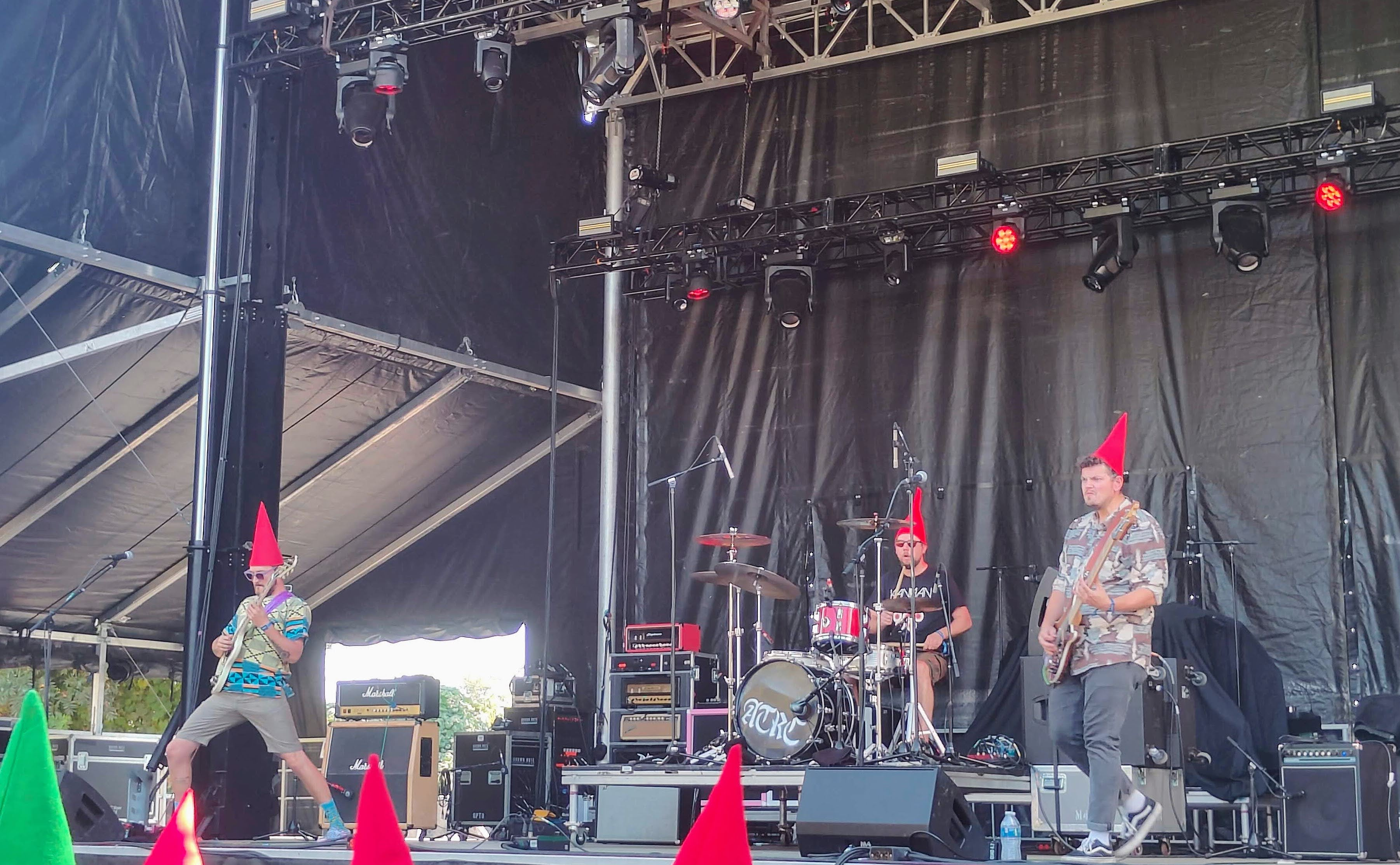
- Gnome performing in 2023

Background information
- Origin: Antwerp, Belgium
- Genres: Stoner rock; stoner metal; progressive metal
- Years active: 2016–present
- Label: Polderrecords
- Members: Rutger Verbist; Egon Loosveldt; Geoffrey Verhulst

Gnome are a Belgian stoner rock/metal band from Antwerp consisting of Rutger Verbist, Egon Loosveldt, and Geoffrey Verhulst. They have released three studio albums, Father of Time (2018), King (2022), and Vestiges of Verumex Visidrome (2024).

The band is known for whimsical or silly themes in their songwriting with heavy riffs. They are easily identified by red pointed hats associated with garden gnomes, which fans will also wear during live performances.

== History ==
=== Formation ===
Lead vocalist/guitarist Rutger Verbist had a long history of creating songs he deemed "silly" or "for laughs", until writing the song "Fuzz Lightyear" in September 2015, convincing him he could form a band grounded in a fun yet heavy sound. He created an ad for a drummer and recruited Egon Loosveldt soon thereafter, envisioning the group as a duo. However, Verbist's longtime friend Geoffrey Verhulst would be recruited to handle bass playing, as Verbist was not able to play bass at the time. They played with names, originally playing as Sleepless Titan, until they settled on Gnome in 2016, deriving from that of the mythical creature.

=== Father of Time (2018–2022) ===
Father of Time was released on 8 June 2018. There was a release party at the Kavka in Antwerp, where Gnome were joined by other Belgian rock bands Ten Foot Wizard and Hidden Trails. The album had very limited vocals and was described by the band as "very experimental".

During the COVID-19 pandemic, Gnome worked on material for their next album King, recording with Frank Rotthier at Rockstar Recordings in the fall of 2020.

=== King (2022–2024) ===
In the buildup to the release of their second album, King, they released the single "Ambrosius" with an accompanying music video on 24 February 2022. Another music video for "Wenceslas" would be released on 21 April 2022. Additional vocals were provided by Óskar Logi Ágústsson (of The Vintage Caravan). King released on 6 May 2022 and spawned an additional music video for the song "Kraken Wanker" (21 May). That October, Gnome played at Desertfest in Antwerp at the Trix music center. They would continue to play at Desertfest in London and Berlin the following May.

King was developed with a theme of a war between a fictional king named Wenceslas and the gnomes. Greg Kennelty of Metal Injection praised the album, describing it as a "perfect blend of progressive rock, stoner rock, and even some fairly growly sludge all wrapped up into one beautifully weird package". Peter Jerman praised the track "Wenceslas" in Tuonela Magazine's Song of The Day on 13 December 2023, saying "I was instantly taken by their cool mix of groovy, doomy riffs, funky dance vibes, and those slightly goofy lyrics".

In April 2023, Gnome opened for The Datsuns at De Casino in Sint-Niklaas.

Gnome announced their "US Blasphemy Tour" in August 2023, with dates running from September to October. They began by playing at the 2023 Louder than Life Festival in Louisville and hit smaller venues heading west until they wrapped up their tour at Aftershock Festival in Sacramento on 8 October.

Following the tour, the group returned to Belgium and covered (with Atomic Vulture) for The Great Machine and Ruff Majik at Desertfest Antwerp 2023, as the groups were unable to make it.

=== Vestiges of Verumex Visidrome (2024–present) ===
On 28 June 2024, Gnome released the single "Old Soul" from their newly-announced album Vestiges of Virumex Visidrome on their Bandcamp. They released a video for the album's second single, "Golden Fool", on 1 August and the third single, "The Ogre", on 6 September.

Vestiges of Verumex Visidrome was released on 13 September 2024. The album reviewed well with critics in the underground stoner metal scene.

In 2026, they headlined the Total Rock stage during the first day of Takedown Festival 2026 in Portsmouth, UK.

== Band members ==
- Rutger Verbist – vocals, lead guitar
- Egon Loosveldt – drums
- Geoffrey Verhulst – bass

== Discography ==
Studio albums

- Father of Time (2018)
- King (2022)
- Vestiges of Verumex Visidrome (2024)

Singles

- "Ambrosius" (2022)
- "Old Soul" (2024)
