= In Vogue =

Studio album by Drop Dead, Gorgeous
- Released: May 2, 2006
- Genres: Metalcore, post-hardcore
- Length: 41:26
- Label: Rise
- Producer: Kris Crummett

Drop Dead, Gorgeous chronology
In Vogue (2006)	Worse Than a Fairy Tale (2007)

Professional ratings
Review scores
Source	Rating
AllMusic	2.5/5 stars

In Vogue is the first studio album by Drop Dead, Gorgeous. The album was released on May 2, 2006.

== Track listing ==
1. Dressed for Friend Requests – 2:36
2. Girl, Are You on Your...? – 3:04
3. E.R. – 2:26
4. Well, I Never... – 2:02
5. Knife vs. Face: Round 1 – 4:02
6. Marietta – 2:51
7. Are You Happy? – 1:36
8. Fashion Your Seatbelts – 2:39
9. In Vogue – 1:57
10. Daniel, Where's the Boat? – 2:27
11. The Show Must Go On – 15:46

== Personnel ==
Drop Dead, Gorgeous

- Daniel Stillman – lead vocals, keyboards, programming, additional guitars
- Kyle Browning – guitar, keyboards, programming, backing vocals
- Dan Gustavson – guitar
- Jake Hansen – bass
- Danny Cooper – drums, percussion
