= Meaning in the Static =

Studio album by On the Last Day
- Released: August 22, 2006
- Studios: Rainstorm Studios, Bellevue, Washington, USA
- Genres: Rock; Post-hardcore; Screamo
- Length: 43:22
- Label: Victory Records
- Producer: Steve "The Devil" Carter

On the Last Day chronology
Wars Like Whispers (EP) (2005)	Meaning in the Static (2006)	Make It Mean Something (2008)

Professional ratings
Review scores
Source	Rating
Allmusic	2.5/5 stars
Disagreement.net	4/10
PopMatters	3/10

Meaning in the Static is the debut album by the band On the Last Day, released on August 22, 2006, by Victory Records. Production was handled by Steve Carter.

== Track listing ==
1. "Twelve C.C.'s" - 3:37
2. "Below One Hundred" - 3:58
3. "Leaving the Citadel" - 3:07
4. "The Rescue" - 4:04
5. "Meaning In the Static" - 3:09
6. "So Here Is Us, On the Raggedy Edge" - 3:38
7. "Missing Frames (Changeover)" - 3:14
8. "At the Breaking of the World" - 3:20
9. "Initial Deployment" - 3:09
10. "A Welcoming Haunting" - 4:09
11. "The Journey and The Balance" - 8:06

Total: 43 minutes
