= Nightmare Anatomy =

Studio album by Aiden
- Released: October 4, 2005
- Recorded: 2004–2005
- Genres: Post-hardcore; screamo
- Length: 40:09
- Label: Victory
- Producer: Steve Carter

Aiden chronology
Our Gangs Dark Oath (2004)	Nightmare Anatomy (2005)	Rain in Hell (2006)

Nightmare Anatomy is the second studio album by American rock band Aiden, released on October 4, 2005 by record label Victory. It was produced by Steve Carter.

== Background ==
In 2009, speaking to Kerrang!, Francis commented:

For Nightmare... I'd learnt how to write and arrange things better than I'd done on Our Gang. Nightmare is a lot more focused on structure; verse, chorus, verse, chorus. I know that a lot of people like Nightmare Anatomy and I think it's a great record for where we were at as a band then. It's a hard-hitting, in your face punk rock album and that was the album we wanted to make at the time.

== Release ==
In July and August 2005, the group supported The Hurt Process on their New Faces from Different Places tour. It was released on October 4 through record label Victory. It was supported by three singles: "Knife Blood Nightmare", "The Last Sunrise" and "Die Romantic". The Japan release also contains a bonus DVD with interviews, music video, and other material.

October through December 2005 the band played the opening slot on the Never Sleep again tour with Silverstein, Bayside and Hawthorne Heights.

In March and April 2006, the group supported Thirty Seconds to Mars on the Forever Night Never Day tour. In May and June, the band supported HIM on their tour of the U.S. The band went on the 2006 edition of the Warped Tour. In October and November, the band supported Silverstein in their Never Shave Again Tour in the US.

For Aiden's final tour in the fall of 2015, they played Nightmare Anatomy in its entirety.

== Reception ==
Professional ratings
Review scores
Source	Rating
AllMusic	3.5/5 stars
Melodic	2.5/5 stars
Punknews.org	1/5 stars

The album peaked at number 196 on the Billboard 200, number 9 on the Billboard Heatseekers Chart, and number 16 on the Billboard Independent Albums Chart, selling over 89,000 copies. The album has received a mixed-to-negative reaction from music critics.

== Track listing ==
No.	Title	Length
1.	"Knife Blood Nightmare"	3:06
2.	"The Last Sunrise"	3:43
3.	"Die Romantic"	3:40
4.	"Genetic Design for Dying"	3:28
5.	"Breathless"	3:58
6.	"Unbreakable (I.J.M.A.)"	3:22
7.	"It's Cold Tonight"	3:13
8.	"Enjoy the View"	2:45
9.	"Goodbye We're Falling Fast"	3:34
10.	"This City Is Far from Here"	3:07
11.	"See You in Hell..."	6:13
Total length:		40:09

Bonus DVD (2005 Japan Release)
No.	Title	Length
1.	"Mordecai"
2.	"Top Gun"
3.	"Slumber Party"
4.	"Convalescence"
5.	"Body and Blood"
6.	"Suffocating Words"
7.	"Crimson"
8.	"Knife Blood Nightmare"
9.	"Necessary Bloodshed"
10.	"Wake the Dead"

== Personnel ==
Aiden

- Wil Francis – lead vocals
- Angel Ibarra – lead guitar, backing vocals
- Jake Wambold – rhythm guitar, backing vocals
- Nick Wiggins – bass guitar, backing vocals
- Jake Davison – drums, backing vocals

Production and additional personnel

- Steve Carter – production, engineer, mixing
- Justin Armstrong – engineer
- Paul Speer – mixing, mastering
- Gregg Keplinger – drum technician
- Aaron Edge – layout, design, backing vocals
- Brian "Spicoli" Johnson – backing vocals
- Salo – photography
- Misha Hunting – band photography
