= On the Last Day =

American post-hardcore band

- Origin: Seattle, Washington, U.S.
- Genres: Post-hardcore, alternative rock, emo, screamo
- Years active: 2003–2009
- Labels: Torque, Victory
- Past members: Aaron Johnson; Justin Johnson; Frank Gross; Drew Dowell; Geoffrey Walker; Carson Allen

On the Last Day (OtLD) was a five-piece post-hardcore band from Seattle, Washington.

== Biography ==
Soon after forming in 2003 in Seattle, On the Last Day started touring the local club scene, with the likes of Boys Don't Bleed, Up Falls Down, Aiden, Atreyu, and Deftones. With the help of Wil Francis of Aiden, the band was set up with talent scouts from many labels. Victory Records (Aiden's label) signed the band in 2006. Prior to the release of the 2006 album Meaning in the Static, On the Last Day released Wars Like Whispers, an EP featuring Francis. Meaning in the Static has received mixed reviews from critics.

On the Last Day's first North American tour was in the summer of 2006 (August 10 – September 12) with New Jersey's pop-punk band Crash Romeo. The tour lasted for 33 days with 22 venues. The group toured Europe early in 2007.

Geoff Walker left the band on May 24, 2007. Carson Allen (formerly of Escape the Fate and Devilyn Alaska) has been announced as the new vocalist.

As of February 2008, On the Last Day was no longer a part of Victory Records.

On the Last Day's second EP, Make it Mean Something was released on Torque Records. The album charted at number 3 on the west coast Billboard Heatseekers chart.

Vocalist Carson Allen started a new band with Nick Wiggins of Aiden called "Me Vs Myself"

== Members ==
- Frank Gross – lead guitar (2003–2009)
- Justin Johnson – rhythm guitar (2003–2009)
- Aaron Johnson – bass (2003–2009)
- Drew Dowell – drums (2003–2009)
- Geoff Walker – vocals (2003–2007)
- Carson Allen – vocals, keyboards (2007–2009)

== Discography ==
- Wars Like Whispers EP (2005)
- Meaning in the Static (2006)
- Make It Mean Something EP (2008)
