= Disguises (Aiden album) =

Studio album by Aiden
- Released: March 29, 2011
- Recorded: 2010–2011
- Genre: Horror punk, hardcore punk, heavy metal
- Length: 30:38
- Label: Victory
- Producer: William Control

Aiden chronology
From Hell... with Love (2009)	Disguises (2011)	Some Kind of Hate (2011)

Singles from Disguises
- 1. "Walk Among the Dead" Released: March 15, 2011; 2. "Hysteria" Released: April 4, 2011; 3. "A Portrait of the Artist" Released: June 29, 2011

Professional ratings
Review scores
Source	Rating
AllMusic	3/5 stars
Rockfreaks.net	3/10 stars
Rock Sound	5/10 stars
Sputnikmusic	2/5 stars

Disguises is the fifth studio album by American rock band Aiden. Disguises was recorded some time between 2010 and 2011. Unlike previous albums, Disguises has a large usage of gang vocals. It is also their last album with founding drummer Jake Davison.

This is the only album by Aiden to not chart on Billboard Top 200, or any other chart.

So far, three singles have been released. "Walk Among the Dead", "Hysteria" (the first music video of the album), and "A Portrait of the Artist", which was released on their personal YouTube channel "Aidenvision". The music video for "Hysteria", featuring lyrics critical of religion, shows William Francis singing in a priest's robe juxtaposed with stock footage of burning churches, religious leaders, and social unrest. The music video for "A Portrait of the Artist" shows the other Aiden band members kidnapping Francis and ultimately hanging him and notably features drummer Ryan Seaman wearing a bandanna in place of Davison. No video for the first single, "Walk Among the Dead" has been released.

== Track listing ==
No.	Title	Writer(s)	Length
1.	"The Devil's Eyes"		1:05
2.	"Horror Queen"		3:34
3.	"Malevolent Conversion"		2:30
4.	"A Portrait of the Artist"		3:11
5.	"Shine"		3:31
6.	"The Essence"		0:24
7.	"Hysteria"		4:11
8.	"Perfect Muse"		2:18
9.	"ReEvolver"		3:13
10.	"Walk Among the Dead"		3:38
11.	"Radio" (Alkaline Trio cover)	M. Skiba, D. Andriano	3:07
Total length:			30:38

== Personnel ==
=== Aiden ===
- Jake Davison – drums
- Zombie Nicholas – bass, background vocals
- Angel Ibarra – lead guitar
- Wil Francis – vocals, rhythm guitar, piano

=== Performers ===
- Austin Held – additional vocals on "ReEvolver"
- Ash Costello – additional vocals on "Shine"
- Rick Kern – additional vocals
- Jeremy Beddingfield – additional vocals
- Allana Smith – additional vocals
- Roya Nourani – additional vocals
- Daniel Matson – additional vocals
- Jamie Wheelock – additional vocals
- Nicholas McMahan – additional vocals
- Harry MacDonald – additional vocals

=== Design ===
- Chad Micheal Ward – cover photo
- Ciera Walters – band photo
- Doublej – layout design

=== Technical ===
- William Control – production, engineering, mixing
- Joel Casey Jones – engineering assistant
- Bob Bicknell – engineering assistant
- Justin Armstrong – mixing

== Release history ==
Region	Date	Label	Format	Catalogue
United States	March 29, 2011	Victory	CD	VR609
