= Carson Allen =

American singer-songwriter

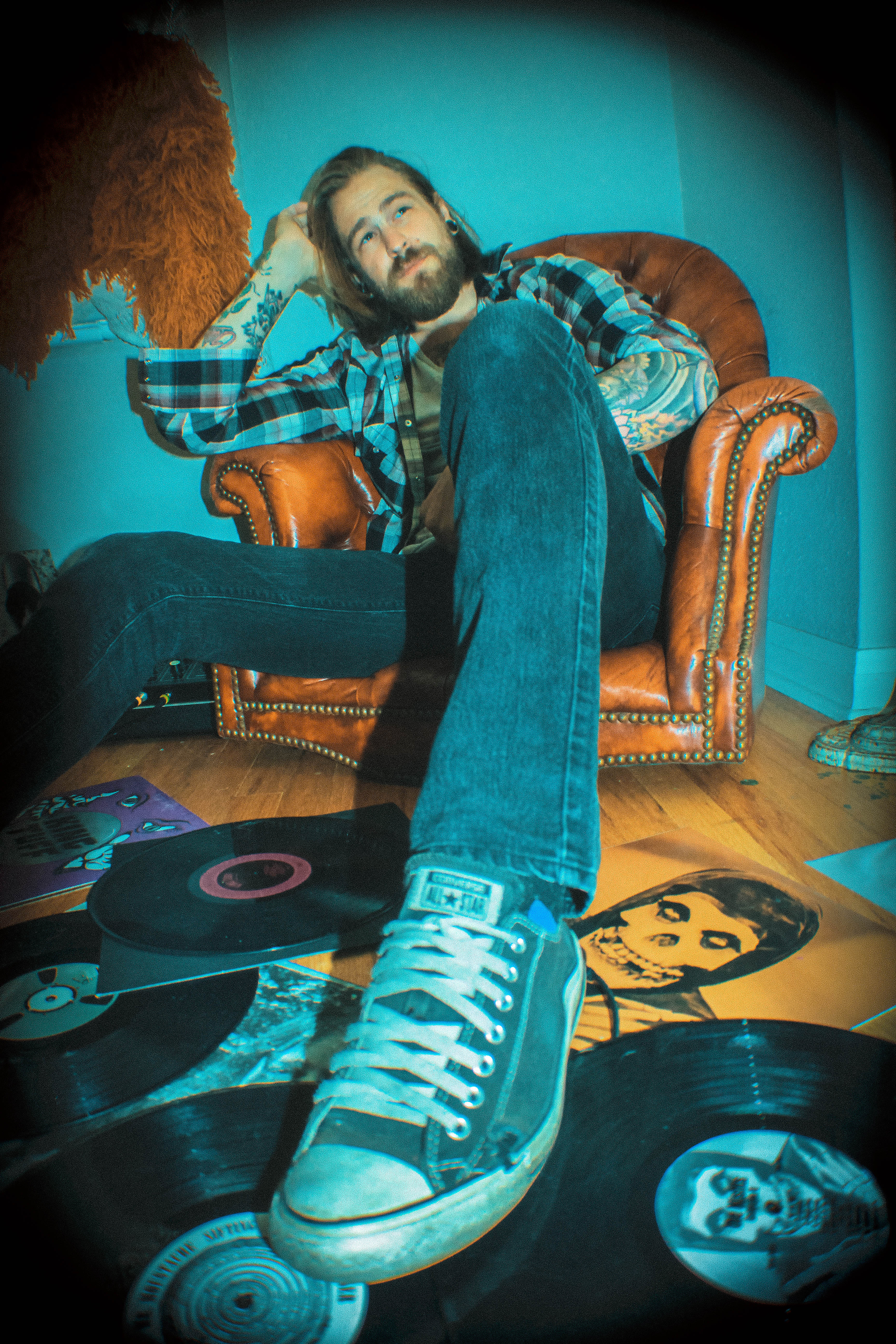
- Self-portrait photograph

Background information
- Born: Carson Cole Allen; United States
- Genres: Psychedelic rock, alternative rock, pop, blue-eyed soul, soul (current) post-hardcore, metalcore, screamo, emo, pop punk (formerly)
- Occupations: Singer, musician, producer, composer
- Instruments: Vocals, piano, guitar, keyboards, bass, synthesizers, drums
- Years active: 2004–present
- Labels: Capitol, Century Media, Chronicle Music, Epitaph, Victory, Torque
- Formerly of: Me Vs. Myself, On the Last Day, TraceMyVeins, Apathy Drowns Desire, Escape the Fate
- Website: instagram.com/carsonfoundit

Carson Cole Allen is an American singer-songwriter known for his roles as a founding member & keyboardist of Las Vegas band Escape the Fate, lead vocalist for On the Last Day, Me vs. Myself and traceMYveins. As well founding member of Something Witchy and the most recent project, Palm Seer, which includes Nicholas Wiggins.

== Musical career ==
=== Early days and TraceMyVeins (2004–2005) ===
Carson attended Billings West High School and graduated in 2005. During his time there, he joined his first band at age 14. Since then he has been in numerous bands, playing different types of music. Carson Allen had started his own post-hardcore band titled "TraceMyVeins" after leaving previous band "Apathy Drowns Desire" after releasing the EP Farewell Edgewood. The band released two songs that were to be their singles titled "I Wish I Knew How to Quit You" and "This Is What You Get for Helping People?". After realizing the band wasn't getting anywhere, Allen decided to quit to join "Devilyn Alaska" and then eventually On the Last Day.

=== On the Last Day (2007–2009) ===
Before joining On the Last Day, Allen had recorded some songs with Devilyn Alaska. When Geoff Walker was removed the band, On the Last Day, in May 2007, Allen had been announced as their new vocalist. On February 13, 2008, On the Last Day left their record label of Victory Records. On the Last Day then released their second EP called Make It Mean Something, which was released through Torque Records. The album charted at number 3 on the west coast Billboard Heatseekers chart.

=== Me vs. Myself (2009–present) ===
After the band announced their hiatus, Me vs. Myself was started in 2009 in Seattle by singer Carson Allen, along with Jaron Johnson, Nick Wiggins and formerly Frank Gross till he left the band in 2011. The four recorded their debut EP "Seasons", which was released February 2010. After playing shows in Seattle, Me vs. Myself began playing shows along the west coast in June 2010. The following January, the band relocated to Los Angeles to work on what would be their Debut LP. On November 29 the band released another EP titled Where I Am...Where I Want to Be, tracked in Buffalo, New York, at the studio owned by The Goo Goo Dolls. The track "Now and Then" was produced by Goo's bassist Robby Takac.

The band had split in 2012, playing their last show and then deleting their Facebook page with no reason given. They released a statement about the split three years later:

Exactly 3 years ago, we released "Where I Am... Where I Want To Be"! Since then, we have traveled all over the world individually. Finding who we are. Finding purpose. And finding inspiration. Our paths have crossed occasionally, and every interaction has been magic. We started this band because we all believed in each other, and wanted to share dreams, share adventure, and share our passion for music.. Together! The last show Me Vs Myself played was (also) exactly 3 years ago. The reason that was the last was not because we didn't want to continue, it's because we all needed to experience life a bit more. On January 9th, we will return to the stage that we shared exactly 3 years ago. Play the exact same set. And put the exact same passion into showing the world that Me Vs Myself isn't just a band. It's a hub for people who need hope. A safe place to pour your heart. An escape... The exact reason we started this! See you soon...

— MVM

In early 2014, the band made a new page and announced they were getting back together. They released a demo for a new track they were working on called "If She Knew Better". On October 31, they announced their first reunion show, the band has been playing shows ever since then. The band eventually went on a short split to focus on other projects but reunited in 2015, announcing their first show for January 9.

=== Solo career/IN GOD WE RUST (2012–present) ===
On the April 12, 2012, Carson Allen released his new single "Believe". A few days later, on April 16, Carson Allen posted on his Facebook page that "It was only a month ago I decided I wanted to do a solo project. I started a page on here, and got to work, a month later, I have over 1000 fans on here, released my first single, and am in the process of booking my first show. Everything I do would be pointless without you amazing people!! There are some BIG things ahead. I'm pumped to have you along for the ride! – Carson". On the June 28, Carson released his solo debut titled Something Beautiful.

Early 2013, Carson announced that he was in the middle of writing the follow-up release to "Something Beautiful". Soon after, he released the name of the upcoming record, "Blue Eyed Soul". Production for Blue Eyed Soul began on March 1, 2013.

On February 25, Allen announced that he will be releasing his solo music under the moniker IN GOD WE RUST, and that he has started a new record at Streetlight Audio in Denver, Colorado. "Keep It Cool" EP was released on April 15, 2016.

=== Something Witchy (2016–present) ===
After moving back to Seattle in 2016, Allen announced in December that he, former bandmate Nick Wiggins and wife Melody Mars had started a new project called Something Witchy. Followed by the release of tracks "Sweet Dreams" and "Free Lies".

On September 1, Something Witchy released the single "Feeler", and played their first show sold-out performance at Seattle's legendary venue BARBOZA the following week, with Carson announcing on stage that a music video for "Feeler" would soon follow (October 1).

On August 10, 2018, Something Witchy released their debut EP "BLUE SKY".

== Discography ==
Apathy Drowns Desire

- Farewell Edgewood (2005)

TraceMyVeins

- Blood Bath And Beyond (2006)

On the Last Day

- Make It Mean Something (2008)

Me Vs. Myself

- Seasons (2010)
- Where I Am... Where I Want To Be (2012)

Solo / IN GOD WE RUST

- Something Beautiful (2012)
- Blue Eyed Soul (2013)
- Bad Attitude (2013)
- Keep It Cool EP (2016)
