= Our Gangs Dark Oath =

Studio album by Aiden
- Released: June 1, 2004
- Recorded: January 2004
- Genre: Post-hardcore
- Length: 44:56
- Label: Dead Teenager
- Producer: Steve Carter

Aiden chronology
| A Split of Nightmares (2004) | Our Gangs Dark Oath (2004) | Nightmare Anatomy (2005) |

Our Gangs Dark Oath is the debut studio album by post-hardcore band Aiden. The album was released on June 1, 2004. Originally, the album was only available in North America, but it was recently re-released in Europe and again by Victory Records.

"Our Gangs Dark Oath" is also the name of the second chapter of "The Adventures of Huckleberry Finn" by Mark Twain.

== Track listing ==
| No. | Title | Length |
|---|---|---|
| 1. | "Our Gangs Dark Oath" | 1:04 |
| 2. | "The Dawn Breaking Tide" | 2:30 |
| 3. | "I Set My Friends on Fire" (A quotation from the movie The Ring is featured in this song) | 3:06 |
| 4. | "Pledge Resistance" | 2:51 |
| 5. | "Bridge of Reason, Shore of Faith" (A part of the movie Stand by Me can be heard at the beginning of this track) | 3:06 |
| 6. | "Life I Left Behind" | 3:03 |
| 7. | "Looking Glass Eyes" | 2:45 |
| 8. | "Fifteen" | 2:37 |
| 9. | "Kid Becomes the Dream" | 2:24 |
| 10. | "Cold December" | 3:30 |
| 11. | "World by Storm (A part of the movie The Boondock Saints can be heard at the beginning of this track)" | 18:00 |
| Total length: | | 44:56 |

== Background, music and lyrics ==
Our Gangs Dark Oath is a post-hardcore album with elements of punk rock and sometimes screamo. The album's style is similar to the band AFI, with lyrics being about singer Wil Francis' history of drug abuse and struggles from being on his own by his mid-teen years and leaving jail (Francis was in his early 20s when Our Gangs Dark Oath was recorded). Francis got kicked out of school in 8th grade and never went to high school. Francis said during Aiden's early years, he was angry at the world but later stopped caring about it.

== World by Storm ==
The beginning of "World by Storm" contains a sound clip from the courtroom scene of Boondock Saints.

Also, this song contains two segments of silence along with two hidden tracks. "World by Storm" ends at 3:50 followed by silence until 8:00. Then an untitled hidden track begins, a track which contains nothing but a piano. The "Piano Track" plays in regular time until 10:30, at which point the song fades out for just a second and exactly the same song begins playing in reverse. This plays until 13:00.

At this point, the song ends and another segment of silence begins. This silence ends at 15:10 and another untitled hidden track begins: this one containing acoustic guitar and the lead singer's voice. This track leads to the end of the song and album. The breakdown of "World by Storm" is as follows:

- Boondock Saints – 0:00 – 0:10
- World by Storm – 0:10 – 3:50
- silence – 3:50 – 8:00
- Piano track (hidden track, forward) – 8:00 – 10:30
- Piano track (hidden track, reversed) – 10:30 – 13:00
- silence – 13:00 – 15:10
- Silent, Perfect, Deadly (hidden track) – 15:10 – 18:00

== Critical reception ==
Professional ratings
Review scores
| Source | Rating |
|---|---|
| AllMusic | 3/5 stars |
| Kerrang! | 3/5 stars |
| Rock Sound | 4/10 stars |

AllMusic gave the album a neutral review, writing, "Aiden offer up a competent, if not slightly generic, dose of post-hardcore with a dark punk edge" and noting that "the group sounds more like the younger cousins of My Chemical Romance or AFI who just happened to be weaned in a screamo scene."

== Chart positions ==
| Chart | Position |
|---|---|
| Top Independent Albums | 32 |
| Top Heatseekers Albums | 30 |

== Personnel ==
Aiden

- William Francis – lead vocals, piano, programming, keyboard
- Angel Ibarra – lead guitar
- Jake Wambold – rhythm guitar, backing vocals
- Nick Wiggins – bass, backing vocals
- Jake Davison – drums, percussion

Production

- Steve Carter – producer, engineer, mastering, mixing
- Aaron Edge – artwork, construction
- Jeff Hayes – cover photo
