= Rain in Hell =

EP by Aiden
- Released: October 31, 2006
- Recorded: August 16–29, 2006
- Genres: Horror punk, post-hardcore
- Label: Victory

Aiden chronology
Nightmare Anatomy (2005)	Rain in Hell (2006)	Conviction (2007)

Professional ratings
Review scores
Source	Rating
About.com	2.5/5 stars
AbsolutePunk	(45%)
Allmusic	2.5/5 stars
Kerrang!	3/5 stars
Melodic	2.5/5 stars

Rain in Hell is an EP/DVD by the post-hardcore band Aiden.

== Contents ==
It includes new tracks as well as a cover of The Misfits' "Die, Die My Darling" and Billy Idol's "White Wedding". "Silent Eyes" was written about the death of former Bayside drummer John "Beatz" Holohan. The DVD features live performances from England and Chicago as well as music videos. A rough mix of "Die Die My Darling" was featured on a Kerrang! cover CD titled High Voltage!: A Brief History of Rock.

== Release ==
On August 29, 2006, Rain in Hell was announced for release. On October 17, "The Suffering" was made available for streaming via the band's Myspace account. It was released on October 31 through Victory. An official music video for the song "We Sleep Forever" was also released on March 12, 2007. The music video features clips from the supernatural horror film Dead Silence.

== Track listing ==
No.	Title	Length
1.	"A Candlelight Intro"	2:12
2.	"The Suffering"	3:44
3.	"We Sleep Forever"	3:17
4.	"White Wedding" (Billy Idol cover)	3:31
5.	"Die, Die My Darling" (Misfits cover)	3:22
6.	"Silent Eyes" (acoustic version)	3:25

=== DVD listing ===
1. Live set from Never Sleep Again Tour in Chicago's House of Blues
  - "Knife Blood Nightmare" (live)
  - "Last Sunrise" (live)
  - "Die Romantic" (live)
  - "Goodbye, We're Falling Fast" (live) [Not listed in case or DVD menu]
  - "I Set My Friends on Fire" (live)
  - "World by Storm" (live)
2. "Knife Blood Nightmare" (video)
3. "Die Romantic" (video)
4. "The Last Sunrise" (video)
5. Extra bonus hometown performances
  - "Last Sunrise" (Live At The Underwood In London, UK)
  - "Die Romantic" (Live At The Showbox In Seattle, WA)
  - "Unbreakable" (Live At The Showbox In Seattle, WA)
  - "I Set My Friends on Fire" (Live At Warped Tour 2006 In Tilley Park, IL)

== Chart positions ==
Chart	Position
US Independent Albums	23
US Heatseekers Albums	9
UK Albums	167
