= Budderside =

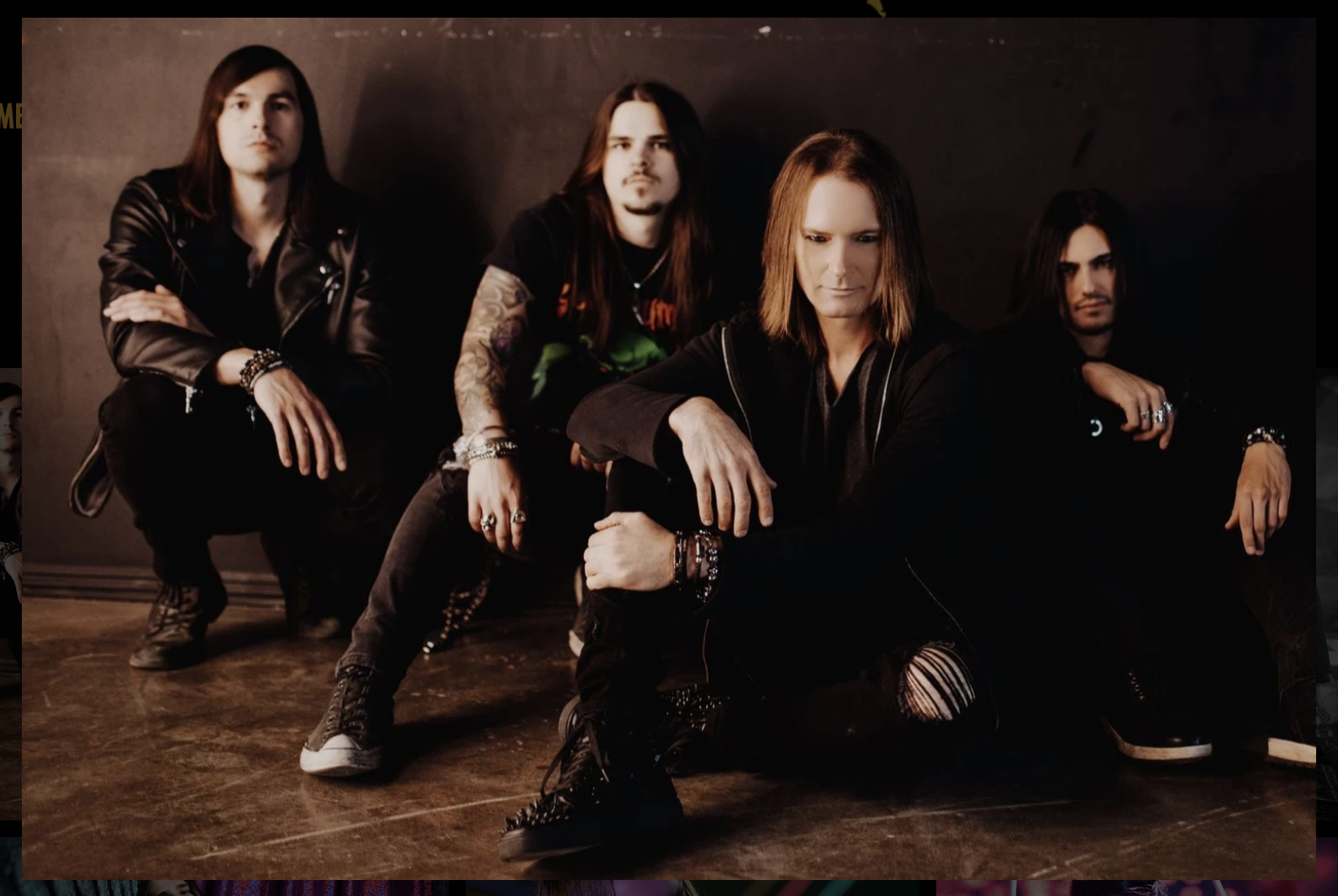

Background information
- Origin: Los Angeles, California
- Genres: Gothic Rock; Sleaze Rock; Hard rock; Metal; Rock and Roll; Heavy Metal
- Years active: 2015–present

Budderside is an American hard rock band from Los Angeles, California formed in 2000 by Patrick Stone. The band was signed to Motörhead music by Lemmy. The band released two studio albums Spiritual Violence and self-titled Budderside. The current lineup of the band consists of Patrick Alan Stone on vocals, Sam Bam Koltun on guitar, Logan Nikolic on guitar, and, Jeff Dewbray on drums. The band's songs “The Truth” and “Power Hour” have been played on 95.5 FM KLOS in Los Angeles by Matt Pinfield.

== Discography ==
- Budderside (2016)
- Spiritual Violence (2021)
- The Truth EP (2022)
- Joker EP (2022)
- Good For Nothing EP (2024)
- White Flame (2024)
