= Aiden (band) =

American punk rock band

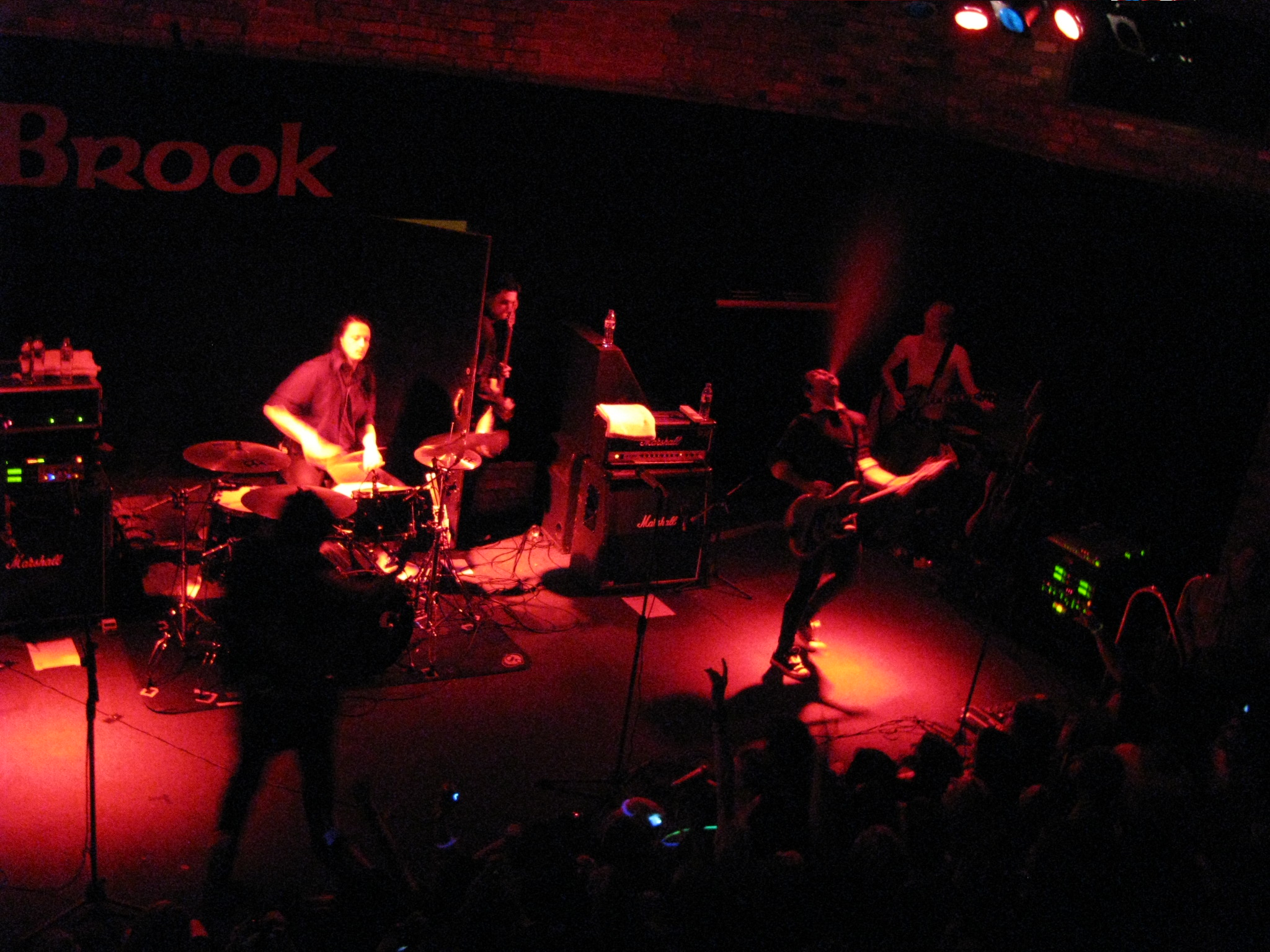
- Aiden performing in 2008

Background information
- Origin: Seattle, Washington, U.S.
- Genres: Post-hardcore; emo; horror punk; gothic rock
- Years active: 2003–2012; 2014–2016
- Labels: Unfun; Dead Teenager; Victory; Control; Riot
- Spinoffs: William Control
- Past members: See members
- Website: aiden.org

Aiden was an American rock band from Seattle, Washington, that formed in the spring of 2003. They achieved underground success during the mid to late 2000s with their classic lineup, featuring vocalist William Francis, guitarists Angel Ibarra and Jake Wambold, bassist Nick Wiggins, and drummer Jake Davison.

== History ==
=== Early years and Our Gangs Dark Oath (2003–2004) ===
The band formed in 2003 and is named after the character Aidan Keller of the 2002 film The Ring ("Dude, that kid's just spooky," Francis said of the character whose name is actually spelled Aidan). Their first full-length album Our Gangs Dark Oath, was released on Dead Teenager Records in 2004. It was recorded while Jake Davison and Angel Ibarra were still in high school and released shortly after they had left.

=== Nightmare Anatomy (2005–2006) ===
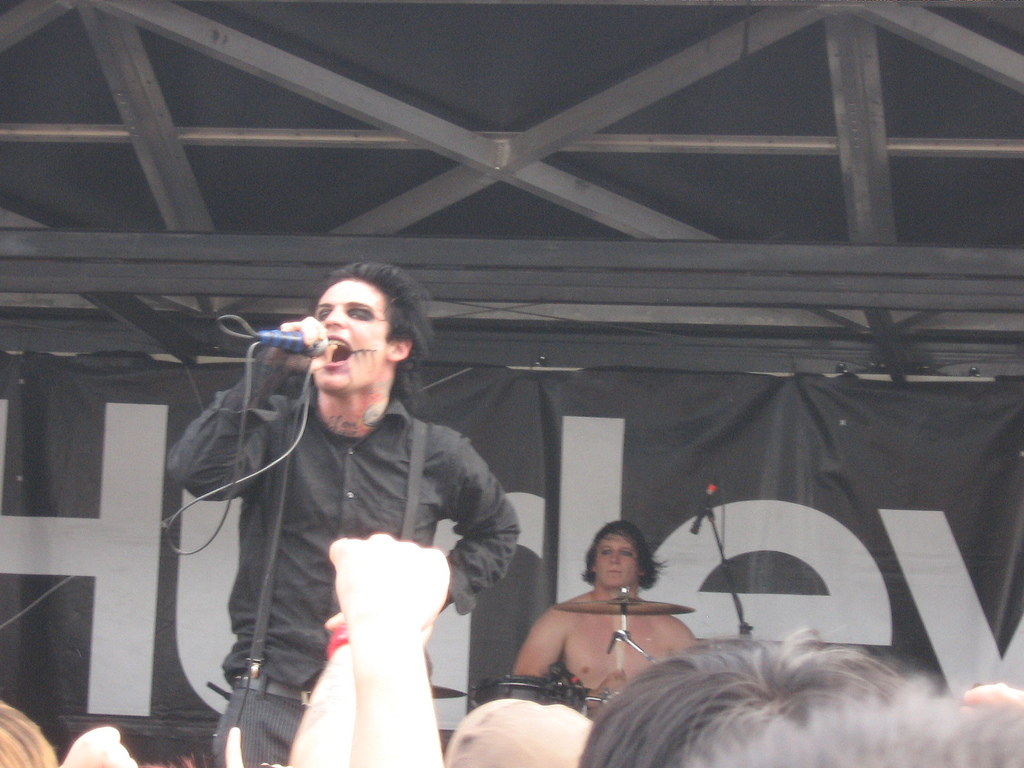
Aiden during the 2006 Warped Tour

Later in 2005, the band was signed to Victory Records. Their second album and debut for Victory Records titled Nightmare Anatomy, was released October 4, 2005. The album peaked at number 196 on the Billboard 200, number 9 on the Billboard Heatseekers Chart, and number 16 on the Billboard Independent Albums Chart. The album has since become one of the band's most commercially and critically successful albums to date. It spawned three successful singles, "The Last Sunrise", "Die Romantic", and "Knife Blood Nightmare".

In March 2006, Aiden played a US tour supporting Thirty Seconds to Mars, and later another US tour supporting the Finnish band HIM, during their Dark Light tour. In April 2007, they played with Lostprophets and Taking Back Sunday. Aiden also partook in the Taste of Chaos 2007 North American Tour alongside The Used, Thirty Seconds to Mars, Senses Fail, Saosin, Chiodos, and Evaline. They played a West Coast tour, followed by a national tour, Confessions in the Dark Tour, with Drop Dead, Gorgeous, Still Remains, and the band 1997.

=== Conviction and William Control (2007–2008) ===
The band's third studio album entitled Conviction, was released on August 21, 2007 and marks a complete change of style in the band's musical direction. The album received commercial success, peaking at number 54 on the Billboard 200, and at number 5 on the Independent albums chart. The first single from Conviction, "One Love", appears in Resident Evil: Extinction, and their song "We Sleep Forever" is featured on the soundtrack of the motion picture Dead Silence. On October 9, 2007, through a MySpace bulletin the band announced that they were filming their next music video, for the song "Moment", thus confirming it as the next single. The band played a show in Anchorage, Alaska in January 2008, introducing their U.S. tour with Madina Lake in February and March 2008. This was the first part of their three-part "World by Storm Tour", the second part of which was a month-long Europe tour with Kill Hannah from late March to late April 2008. The third part, a tour from Massachusetts back to their home base in Seattle, occupied much of May 2008, but the band pulled out of the tour after two shows, according to their web site for "personal reasons". However, the band did reinstate the final two shows, in Spokane and Seattle, near their home base. They played the Bamboozle Festival in East Rutherford, New Jersey in May 2008. Aiden recorded their own version of Ashley Massaro's theme music "Let's Light a Fire Tonight" for the bonus edition of WWE The Music, Vol. 8.

On May 20, 2008, the band announced on their website that Jake Wambold was no longer a member of Aiden. They played their first live show as a four-piece in Spokane, Washington on May 24, 2008. Francis has started a website and a MySpace page for a side project called William Control. William Control is a sort of alter-ego to wiL, and the albums consist of dark content lyric-wise, which wiL stated in a Kerrang! interview did not suit Aiden. Aiden also appeared on the soundtrack to Lost Boys: The Tribe with a cover of the theme song "Cry Little Sister", and did a European tour in October 2008, followed by a U.S. tour in November, called The Suffer Little Children Tour, finishing December 7. On December 14 Aiden posted a blog on their MySpace saying that they are in the studio writing and recording songs for their next album. The blog also said that there are about 25 songs that they are working with and William also mentioned he'd written 30 songs for the new record in an Alternative Press podcast.

=== Knives (2009–2010) ===
Aiden's fourth full-length album entitled Knives was released on May 12, 2009 (May 11 in the UK). The album peaked at number 95 on the Billboard 200 and at number 12 on the Independent Albums chart. On March 31, 2009, a new single, "Scavengers of the Damned," was made available through iTunes, the second single being Let The Right One In. In April 2009 Aiden announced a UK tour on their MySpace. They stated that they chose the smallest venues that were available. In May Aiden headlined the Music Saves Lives Summer Kickoff Party. While out on the 2009 Van's Warped Tour they did signings for the non-profit organization where they met with fans who gained special access to the band by donating blood. In January and February 2010 the band accompanied Anti-Flag on the 'Economy Sucks, Let's Party!' Tour, where in Chicago they filmed a live DVD and CD entitled From Hell... with Love, which was released on March 16, 2010, as stated in an interview with BareBonesMusic.com. Also in addition they stated on Kerrang that they will be returning to the UK and Europe with Saosin. After Saosin pulled out, the tour was planned to continue but was later cancelled because of a lack of funds. Aiden then toured the UK in November/December 2010 with Support from Francesqa and The Dead Formats.

=== Disguises and Some Kind of Hate (2011–2012) ===
On February 2, 2011, Disguises was released on March 29, 2011. The first single released was "Walk Among the Dead" on iTunes. A music video for "Hysteria" was released in April, and a music video for "A Portrait of the Artist" was released the last week in June.

On May 9, 2011 Aiden announced that drummer Jake Davison left the band, for reasons of pursuing a new direction in life. According to William in a blog on Myspace, Davison's departure and relationship with the rest of the band did not end badly. Aiden recruited Ryan Seaman, the drummer of Falling In Reverse, and headlined the Horror Nights Tour with Vampires Everywhere!, Eyes Set to Kill, Dr. Acula, and Get Scared during the summer of 2011.

Aiden released their fifth studio album Some Kind of Hate on October 25, 2011. It was the last album released on Victory Records, and the second Aiden album released in 2011. A music video for the first single "Broken Bones" was filmed, and premiered on YouTube. In December 2011, the band announced, via their official web page, that they would be headlining the "Rock Beyond Belief " festival at Fort Bragg in March. The festival was billed as a secular response to the Christian music festival "Rock the Fort" which had previously taken place at Fort Bragg and the festival organizers used the music video for "Hysteria" from as part of the event's promotion.

On January 1, 2012, lead guitarist Angel Ibarra decided to leave the band. Despite this, the band partook in the "Something Wicked This Way Comes tour", that took them all over the US west coast in January 2012 with Wednesday 13 and Modern Day Escape. For this tour, Ian MacWilliams and Keef West joined the band on guitar and drums, respectively. "There Will Be Blood", the opening track from Some Kind of Hate, was used as the theme song for the Total Nonstop Action Wrestling pay per view event Genesis (2012).

=== Hiatus (2012–2014) ===
After the end of the Something Wicked This Way Comes tour, Aiden went on hiatus. Francis focused on William Control and his writing career while Wiggins focused on his new band, Girl On Fire. Francis also produced albums for Fearless Vampire Killers and Ashestoangels during this time. In an interview with Under the Gun Review in January 2013, Francis stated that Aiden would disband after releasing one more album. The album was originally meant to be released in 2014 but ultimately was pushed back to the next year.

On January 27, 2012, Fox News posted a story involving a controversial promotion of the Rock Beyond Belief concert, a public event organized by atheist members of the military. Aiden agreed to headline the event, promoting the concert using their 2011 music video for "Hysteria" from the album Disguises. Fox News claimed the band is promoting church burning in the video, causing controversy in comments on the music video and the group's Facebook page. Aiden has stated that the promotion of church burning was not their intentions for the song.

=== Return and Aiden (2014–2016) ===
On December 30, 2014, Aiden broke their two-year silence by posting simply "2015" on their Facebook account, hinting at a possible reunion. On January 2, Francis posted on Facebook that a new Aiden album was in the works. He revealed that Nick Wiggins had left Aiden, leaving him as the only remaining original member. Wiggins was replaced by Kenneth Fletcher, a longtime member of William Control's live band. In July, Francis stated his desire to release the final Aiden album as a free digital download with a planned release date of October 31. In order to fund the album, he auctioned off much of his old Aiden memorabilia, including outfits he wore in Aiden music videos. He also revealed that the album would be self-titled.

Aiden includes guest vocals from Ashley Costello of New Years Day, Adam Crilly of Ashestoangels, Chris Motionless of Motionless in White, and Craig Mabbitt of Escape The Fate, and Kier Kemp of Fearless Vampire Killers as well as guest drumming from Falling In Reverse's Ryan Seaman. On October 9, the band released the first song from Aiden, "Crawling Up From Hell". During the fall of 2015, Aiden went on the Last Sunrise Tour, billed as the band's final tour and featuring support from Ashestoangels, Never Found, Kissing Candice, and Old Wounds. For this tour, Aiden performed Nightmare Anatomy in its entirety. Even though drummer Keef West contributed to Aiden, he was replaced by Ben Tourkantonis for the tour. Aiden played their final show, January 31 in the Camden Underworld.

== Musical style and influences ==
Corey Apar of AllMusic described Aiden's sound as "surging, darkly melodic post-hardcore," explaining that the band "combine post-hardcore and punk attitudes with gothic aesthetics and a love of all things horror." Hence, the band has been described variously as gothic rock, goth-punk, emo, horror punk, and post-hardcore.

Aiden's debut 2004 album Our Gangs Dark Oath is described as a post-hardcore album with a screamo influence, being compared to punk bands like AFI. The album lacks horror themes in its lyrics and themes, which the band didn't feature until their second album in 2005, Nightmare Anatomy. Instead, Our Gangs Dark Oath has lyrics inspired by Francis' life of jail, drug abuse and being out on his own in his mid-teenage years. Francis said in an interview that at the time, in his early 20s, he was angry at the world and wanted to change everything. "Those are songs I wrote because I was so angry at everything and wanted to change the world, but now I don't give a fuck. [laughs] Now I want to tell fictional stories about whips and chains. You know, things that matter." Nightmare Anatomy has been described as a post-hardcore album with elements of screamo. Aiden took a break from the punk genre with the 2007 album Conviction, which features a pop rock-influenced style with characteristics influenced by rock band The Cure. 2009's Knives showed Aiden returning to the punk genre.

Aiden's influences include New Order, Joy Division, Bad Religion, Nirvana, the Misfits, NOFX, The Damned, and David Bowie. Aiden has been compared to the band AFI.

== Members ==
Final lineup

- William Francis – lead vocals, piano (2003–2016), rhythm guitar (2008–2016), bass (2003)
- Ian MacWilliams – lead guitar, backing vocals (2012–2016)
- Kenneth Fletcher – bass, backing vocals (2015–16)
- Ben Tourkantonis – drums (2015–16)

Touring members

- Mike Novak – drums (2011)
- Ryan Seaman – drums (2011)

Former members

- Steve Clemens – lead vocals (2003)
- Jake Wambold – rhythm guitar, backing vocals (2003–2008)
- Jake Davison – drums (2003–2011)
- Angel Ibarra – lead guitar, backing vocals (2003–2012)
- Nick Wiggins – bass, backing vocals (2003–2015)
- Keef West – drums (2012–2015)

== Discography ==
=== Studio albums ===
Year	Album	Label	Chart peaks			
Year	Album	Label	US	US Indie	US Heat	UK
2004	Our Gangs Dark Oath	Dead Teenager	—	32	30	—
2005	Nightmare Anatomy	Victory	196	16	9	—
2007	Conviction	Victory	54	5	—	45
2009	Knives	Victory	95	12	—	150
2011	Disguises	Victory	—	—	—	—
2011	Some Kind of Hate	Victory	—	—	—	—
2015	Aiden	Self-released	—	—	—	—

=== EPs ===
Year	Album	Label	Chart peaks			
Year	Album	Label	US	US Indie	US Heat	UK
2004	A Split of Nightmares	Unfun	—	—	—	—
2006	Rain in Hell	Victory	—	23	9	167
"—" denotes a release that did not chart.

=== Live albums ===
Year	Album	Label	Chart peaks			
Year	Album	Label	US	US Indie	US Heat	UK
2010	From Hell... with Love	Victory	—	—	—	—
"—" denotes a release that did not chart.

=== Singles ===
Year	Title	Album
2004	"I Set My Friends on Fire"	Our Gangs Dark Oath
2004	"Fifteen"	Our Gangs Dark Oath
2005	"Knife Blood Nightmare"	Nightmare Anatomy
2005	"The Last Sunrise"	Nightmare Anatomy
2005	"Die Romantic"	Nightmare Anatomy
2007	"We Sleep Forever"	Rain in Hell and Dead Silence Soundtrack
2007	"One Love"	Conviction
2007	"Moment"	Conviction
2008	"Cry Little Sister"	Lost Boys: The Tribe
2009	"Scavengers of the Damned"	Knives
2009	"Let the Right One In"	Knives
2011	"Walk Among the Dead"	Disguises
2011	"Hysteria"	Disguises
2011	"A Portrait of the Artist"	Disguises
2011	"Broken Bones"	Some Kind of Hate
2015	"Crawling Up from Hell"	Aiden
2015	"Violence and Devotion	Aiden
2015	"Animals" featuring Chris Motionless	Aiden

== Awards and nominations ==
=== Awards won ===
- Kerrang! Awards 2006 - Best International Newcomer
- Metal Hammer Awards 2006 - Best Newcomer

=== Nominations ===
- Kerrang! Awards 2007 - Best Live Band
