= 1997 (band) =

- Origin: Chicago, Illinois, United States
- Genres: Pop rock, indie pop, alternative rock
- Years active: 2005–2010
- Label: Victory
- Website: www.partylikeits1997.com

1997 was an American pop/rock band from Chicago, Illinois, United States, who were formed in October 2005. They released three albums between 2007 and 2009, but broke up the following year.

== History ==
Several of 1997's members previously played in the Chicago bands Constance, Funeral Etiquette, and October Fall. Their name 1997 was discussed widely, but via the band's MySpace blog, they have rejected all claims of the name's origination. They have since stated that the name came from the younger brother of Caleb Pepp (main vocals/guitar), as a suggestion for a previous band they had started. They began practicing together in October 2005, and after strong local performances signed with Victory Records in October 2006.

Victory issued their first album ...A Better View of the Rising Moon. on April 17, 2007. In April 2007, as the group toured the US with The Audition and The Graduate. The title of the album comes from a haiku by Mizuta Masahide:

Since my house burned down,
I now own a better view
Of the rising moon.

Keyboardist/vocalist Kerri Mack left the group in April 2007 after recording the album, and was replaced with keyboardist/vocalist Alida Marroni. Kerri later performed under the band name Mega Deft where she performs at local clubs as well as wrote music for Tiny Riots.

The group benefited heavily from online buzz and touring; it was named band of the day by SPIN on April 27, 2007, and has received many reviews from press sites. In the fall of 2007, the group toured the US with Aiden, Still Remains, and Drop Dead, Gorgeous.

The band's second album, On the Run, was released on May 27, 2008, again on Victory. The band toured in support of the album, playing several dates on the 2008 Vans Warped Tour.

Marroni was replaced by Arthi Meera, who, after only planning to tour with the band until they found a replacement, was made a permanent member. Matt Wysocki, the band's photographer, joined as their bassist in September 2008. Meera continues to perform around Chicago open mics and has a band with her brother called "fair and kind". In February 2009, the band went on a short US tour with Death in the Park and Galaxy Down.

The band recorded their third album, titled Notes from Underground, which was released on October 13, 2009. The following day, a music video was released for "A Fearless Heart". As of that month, Wysocki was replaced by Brian Osters, and in the following month, Kevin Thomas was no longer in the band. They toured in November and December 2009. They were set to begin an extensive tour in January 2010, but Caleb Pepp announced that the band was "taking an indefinite break from playing shows" and felt that they "need to do some soul-searching and find some new ways to express" themselves. In March 2010, Pepp and the band announced their break up via Myspace.

== Members ==
- Nick Coleman - Drums (2005–2010)
- Caleb Pepp - Guitar, Vocals (2005–2010)
- Cody Josephson - Harmonica, Guitar, Vocals (2005–2010)
- Arthi Meera - Keyboards, Guitar, Vocals (2008–2010)
- Brian Osters - Bass (2010)
- Kerri Leah Mack - Keyboards, Glockenspiel, Vocals (2005–2007)
- Alan Goffinski - Bass, Mandolin, Singing Saw (2005–2007)
- Alida Marroni - Keyboards, Glockenspiel, Vocals (2006–2007)
- Matt Wysocki - Bass, Synth, Theremin (2007–2010)
- Kevin Thomas Snider - Vocals, Tambourine (2005–2009)

== Discography ==
- ...A Better View of the Rising Moon. (Victory, (April 17, 2007))
- On the Run (Victory, (May 27, 2008))
- Notes from Underground (Victory, (October 13, 2009))
