= The Black Moods =

Rock band from Arizona

- Origin: Tempe, Arizona, United States
- Genres: Rock
- Years active: 2012–present
- Label: The Black Moods Masterpiece
- Members: Josh Kennedy; Chico Diaz; Brenden McBride
- Past members: Jordan Hoffman
- Website: www.theblackmoods.com

The Black Moods is an American rock band from Tempe, Arizona. The band consists of vocalist and guitarist Josh Kennedy, bassist Brenden McBride and drummer Chico Diaz. They have appeared frequently on The Bob and Tom Show. Kennedy and Diaz were previously in a band called Chalmers Green, with brothers Kevin Michael Prier (lead vocals) and Ryan Prier (bass). Kennedy and the Prier brothers all hail from Wheaton, Missouri.

== Discography ==
=== Studio albums ===
- The Black Moods (2012)
- Medicine (2016)
- Sunshine (2020)
- Into the Night (2022)
- Passion (2025)

=== Singles ===
Year	Song	Peak chart positions	Album
Year	Song	US Main.	Album
2018	"Bella Donna"	29	Sunshine
2019	"Bad News"	24	Sunshine
2020	"Whatcha Got"	30	Sunshine
2020	"Throwing Shade"	—	Sunshine
2020	"Sunshine"	16	Sunshine
2022	"Saturday Night"	34	Into the Night
2025	"Suit Yourself"	—	TBA
2026	"Time Bomb"	38	TBA

== Music videos ==
Year	Title	Director
2012	"Like a Wave"	Chadwick Fowler
2013	"Can't Sleep At Night"	Chadwick Fowler
2014	"Say It For the Last Time"	Chadwick Fowler
2016	"Within Without"	Unknown
2018	"Bella Donna"	MajureMotion Pictures
2019	"Bad News"	Brandon Friese and Domonick Giorgianni
2020	"Whatcha Got"	Chisel Pixel Productions
2020	"Sunshine"	Stefano Bertelli
2020	"I Need To Know"	Jeremy Simmons
2021	"Home"	MajureMotion Pictures
2021	"She Gets Out"	Jeremy Simmons
2022	"Saturday Night"	Jim Louvau and Tony Aguilera
2022	"The Cure"	Jim Louvau and Tony Aguilera
2022	"Youth Is Wasted On the Young"	Jeremy Simmons
2023	"Hollywood"	Domino Effect Productions
2023	"Roadhouse Blues"	Jeremy Simmons & David Majure
2023	"We Three Kings"	David Majure
2024	"Heaven"	Jim Louvau
2024	"Sugar"	Michael Levine
2025	"I Want Your Love"	Jeremy Simmons
2025	"Where Have the Good Times Gone"	Unknown
2025	"Suit Yourself"	Unknown
2026	"Time Bomb"	Jeremy Simmons
