= Return to Dust (band) =

American rock band

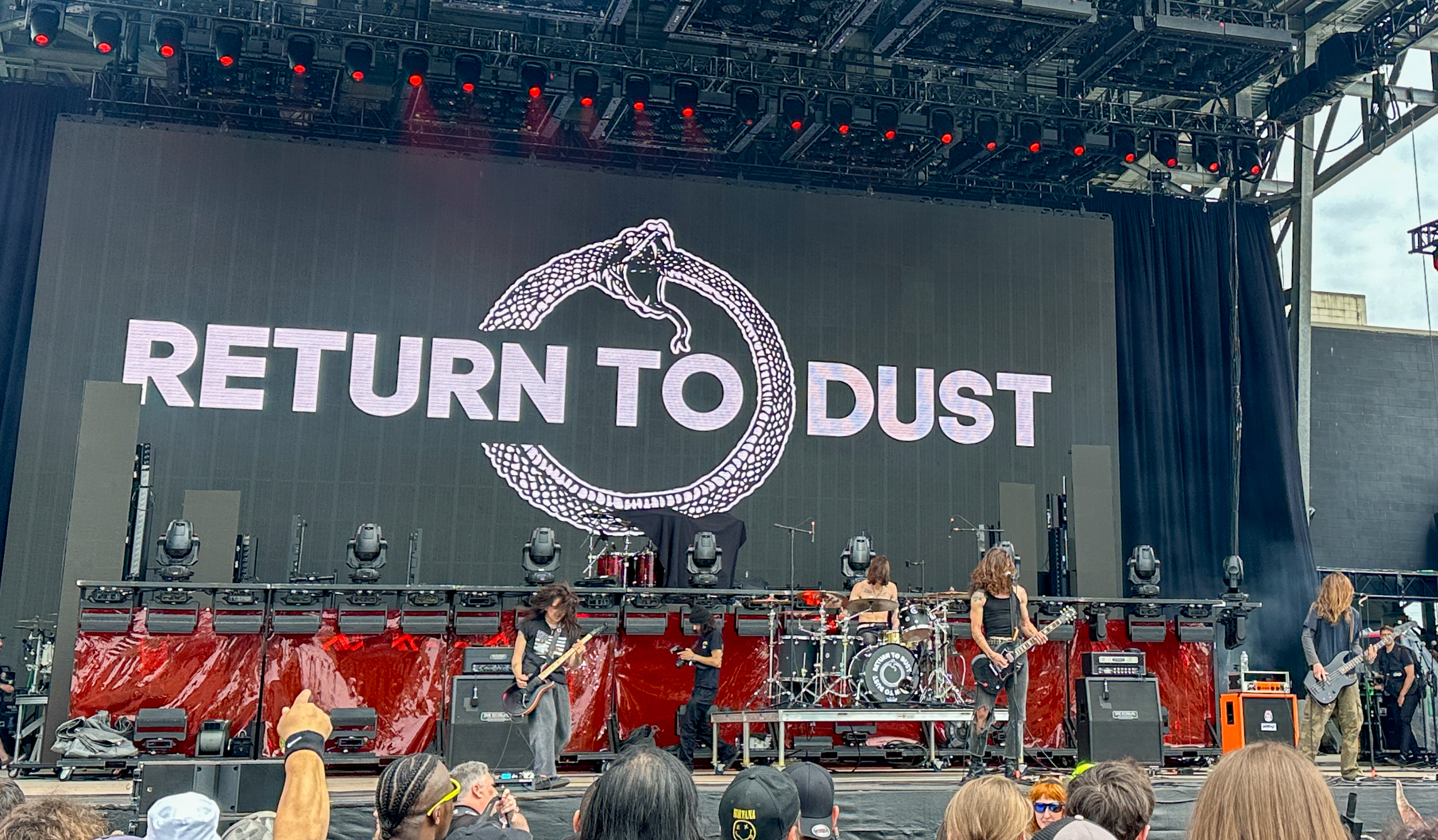
- Return to Dust performing at Sonic Temple in 2025

Background information
- Origin: Los Angeles, California, U.S.
- Genres: Grunge; alternative metal; hard rock; alternative rock
- Years active: 2022–present
- Label: Jim Kaufman Productions Republic
- Members: Matty Bielawski; Graham Stanush; Sebastian Gonzalez; London Hudson
- Website: www.returntodust.com

Return to Dust is an American rock band from Los Angeles, California, formed in 2022. The band released their debut EP Black Road in July 2023. In May 2024, they released their debut studio album, Return to Dust, followed by a tour with Sevendust.

They are a grunge, alternative metal, hard rock and alternative rock band, who is heavily influenced by Alice in Chains. Jim Kaufman, a studio owner and producer saw their potential and took them under his guidance.

== Members ==
- Matty Bielawski – guitar, vocals (2022–present)
- Graham Stanush – bass, vocals (2022–present)
- Sebastian Gonzalez – guitar (2022–present)
- London Hudson – drums (2022–present)

== Discography ==
=== Albums ===
- Return to Dust (2024)

=== EPs ===
- Black Road (2023)
- Speak Like the Dead (2025)

=== Singles ===
List of singles, with year released and album name shown
| Title | Year | Peak chart positions | | | | Albums/EPs |
| Title | Year | US Airplay | US Hard Rock | US Main. | CAN Main. Rock | Albums/EPs |
|---|---|---|---|---|---|---|
| 2023 | "Belly Up" | 47 | — | 26 | — | Return to Dust |
| 2025 | "Bored" | 12 | 20 | 2 | 7 | Speak Like the Dead |

=== Promotional Singles ===
| Year | Title | Album |
|---|---|---|
| 2023 | "Black Road" | Return to Dust |
| 2023 | "No Love" | Return to Dust |
| 2023 | "When You Look at Me" | Return to Dust |
| 2024 | "Bad News" | Return to Dust |
| 2024 | "Face Down" | Return to Dust |
| 2025 | "Shine" | Speak Like the Dead |
| 2025 | "Downfall" | Speak Like the Dead |

=== Music videos ===
| Year | Title | Director(s) |
|---|---|---|
| 2023 | "Black Road" | Matt Akana |
| 2023 | "Belly Up" (Version 1) | Matt Akana |
| 2023 | "Losing Faith" | Matt Akana |
| 2023 | "Cellophane" | Matt Akana |
| 2023 | "No Love" | Matt Akana |
| 2023 | "When You Look At Me" | Matt Akana |
| 2024 | "Bad News" | Matt Akana |
| 2024 | "Strangers" | Callum Scott-Dyson |
| 2024 | "Face Down" | Matt Akana |
| 2025 | "Belly Up" (Version 2) | Jake Miller |
| 2025 | "Shine" | Marmo Films |
| 2025 | "Bored" | Jim Louvau and Tony Aguilera |
| 2025 | "Downfall" | Matt Akana |
| 2025 | "New Religion" | Matt Akana |
| 2026 | "Bored" (Unplugged) | Zach Hasan |
| 2026 | "Sweet Escape" | Matt Akana |
