= Wind Walkers =

American rock band

- Also known as: Atlas (2012–2015)
- Origin: Worcester, Massachusetts, U.S.
- Genres: Post-hardcore; metalcore; alternative metal
- Years active: 2012–present
- Label: Fearless
- Members: Timothy Comeau; Neil Comeau; Craig Martin; Ethan Cheesman; Trevor Borg
- Past members: Corey Prokowiew
- Website: windwalkersofficial.com

Wind Walkers is an American rock band formed in Worcester, Massachusetts. Formed in 2012 by vocalist Corey Prokowiew, guitarists Timothy and Neil Comeau, and bassist Craig Martin, they originally used the name Atlas. In 2014, they hired drummer Ethan Cheesman then the next year changed their name to Wind Walkers. They released their debut EP Tiger Lily in 2015, followed by The Shadow Thieves in 2016. Their debut album The Lost Boys was released in 2018, however in 2020, they band entered a hiatus following allegations of racism against Prokowiew. They returned to activity in 2022 with Prokowiew's role taken over by Trevor Borg. They released their second album What If I Break? in 2023, then released the EP I Don't Belong Here in 2025. During this time, they moved away from their early sound, which was a conventional style of metalcore into a style incorporating elements of pop and electronic music.

== History ==
=== Formation, name change, and The Lost Boys (2012–2018) ===
Wind Walkers formed in 2012 under the name "Atlas" in Worcester, Massachusetts. The band originally consisted of Corey Prokowiew (lead vocals), guitarists Timothy and Neil Comeau, and bassist Craig Martin. In 2014, Timothy Comeau recruited Ethan Cheesman to join the band as their drummer. In 2015, they changed the name to Wind Walkers after finding it to be overly used and unoriginal. On June 21, 2018, they released their debut album The Lost Boys, which was self-released by the band themselves. On October 30, 2018, they released a cover of Halsey's song Without Me", which led to a significant rise in popularity.

=== Prokowiew's firing and hiatus (2019–2020) ===
On June 4, 2020, it was announced that vocalist Corey Prokowiew was fired from the band after tweets that contained racially insensitive content resurfaced. The band issued a statement stating they were "heartbroken, and in no way represent them as a band". In addition, they also announced that the band will be going on indefinite hiatus.

=== Arrival of Trevor Borg and What If I Break? (2022–2024) ===
On March 4, 2022, the band released their first single "Dead Talk", since their hiatus while announcing their addition of Trevor Borg as their lead vocalist. It was followed by "Hangfire" on May 5, 2022, "Drowning Hymns" on August 22, 2022, "Bodybag" on July 20, 2023, and "Dissipate" on October 19, 2023. On October 22, 2023, the band announced their second studio album What If I Break, which was released on November 17, 2023. It is their first studio album since The Lost Boys (2018). Their sixth and final single "The Overlook" was released simulatenously with the album on November 17, 2023.

=== I Don't Belong Here (2025–present) ===
On April 23, 2025, Wind Walkers signed to Fearless Records and released their lead single "The End Aesthetic". Between May 1 and 30, they toured North America, supporting Dayseeker. On June 12, 2025, the band released their second single "Eating My Heart Out". On August 9, 2025, the band released their third and final single "Silk & Static" for their EP I Don't Belong Here which was released on October 3, 2025. This era brought them increased notability, with a 2025 article by Melodic magazine calling them "the scene’s most prominent rising stars".

== Musical style ==
The band's musical style has been described as post-hardcore, metalcore, and alternative metal, with pop, R&B, and electronic elements. Revolver writer Gregory Adams categorised them as "alt-core". Metal Injection editor Isabella Ambrosio called their style "a nu-metal pop fusion that both grooves and rages".

Wind Walkers' early releases were a conventional interpretation of metalcore, however following their 2020 hiatus, they began to incorporate more prominent pop influences. idobi Radio called their electronic elements from this period "utterly refreshing". In 2026, Milwaukee Record credited them with "redefining the very essence of post-hardcore and alternative metal".

The lyrics of What If I Break? (2023) discussed love, death and trauma. Much of the lyrics for I Don't Belong Here (2025) were inspired by Borg's then-recent diagnosis with ADHD.

The band have cited influences including Celine Dion, Bring Me the Horizon, Rain City Drive, Dayseeker, Chase Atlantic, Breakkaway, the Home Team, the 1975, Pvris, Route 94, Dermot Kennedy, James Gang, Frank Ocean, Keshi, Seventeen and Natori.

== Band members ==
Current

- Timothy Comeau – lead guitar (2012–present)
- Neil Comeau – rhythm guitar (2012–present)
- Craig Martin – bass, backing vocals (2012–present)
- Ethan Cheesman – drums (2014–present)
- Trevor Borg – lead vocals (2022–present)

Former

- Corey Prokowiew – lead vocals (2012–2020)

== Discography ==
=== Studio albums ===
List of studio albums, with selected details
Title	Album details
The Lost Boys	Released: June 21, 2018; Label: Self-released
What If I Break?	Released: November 17, 2023; Label: Self-released

=== Extended plays ===
List of extended plays, with selected details
Title	EP details
Tiger Lily	Released: November 7, 2015; Label: none
The Shadow Thieves	Released: April 26, 2016; Label: Self-released
I Don't Belong Here	Released: October 3, 2025; Label: Fearless

=== Music videos ===
Year	Title	Album	Director
2022	"Dead Talk"	What If I Break	Alex Kouvatsos
2022	"Hangfire"	What If I Break	Alex Kouvatsos
2022	"Drowning Hymns"	What If I Break	Alex Kouvatsos
2023	"Bodybag"	What If I Break	Alex Kouvatsos
2023	"Dissipate"	What If I Break	Alex Kouvatsos
2023	"The Overlook"	What If I Break	Alex Kouvatsos
2024	"Bodybag" (Unplugged)	Non-album single	Alex Kouvatsos
2024	"Hangfire" (Unplugged)	Non-album single	Alex Kouvatsos
2025	"The End Aesthetic"	I Don't Belong Here	Alex Kouvatsos
2025	"Eating Your Heart Out"	I Don't Belong Here	Alex Kouvatsos
2025	"Silk & Static"	I Don't Belong Here	Alex Kouvatsos
