= Drop Dead, Gorgeous =

American post-hardcore band

- Origin: Denver, Colorado, U.S.
- Genres: Post-hardcore; metalcore; screamo
- Years active: 2004–2011; 2024–present
- Labels: Geffen; Suretone; Rise
- Members: Daniel "Stills" Stillman; Jake Hansen; Danny Cooper; Jacob Belcher; River Wilde
- Past members: Aaron Rothe; Marcus Tallitsch; Judah Leary; Daniel Passera; Kyle Browning; Dan Gustavson; Jonathan "Duck" Leary

Drop Dead, Gorgeous is an American post-hardcore band from Denver, Colorado. It consisted of frontman Danny Stillman (lead vocals), Kyle Browning (lead guitar), Jake Hansen (bass), Dan Gustavson (rhythm guitar), Jonathan Leary (keys/synth/programming) and Danny Cooper (drums, percussion). They released three full-length albums, as well as an EP. Their 2009 album, The Hot N' Heavy, was charted by Billboard at No. 6 on the Top Heatseekers chart, No. 23 on the Independent Albums chart, and No. 192 on the Billboard 200.

== History ==
In June 2007, Drop Dead, Gorgeous played along with fellow Rise Records label mates The Devil Wears Prada, Dance Gavin Dance, and At the Throne of Judgment on the Rise Records tour. From July 18 to July 22, they played a series of shows in Mexico, before joining the Vans Warped Tour 2007, playing dates from July 25 to August 25.

In 2007, Wes Borland appeared on select tracks on Worse Than a Fairy Tale. Both artists are on Ross Robinson's I AM:WOLFPACK label.

In September and October 2007, they toured in support of Aiden with Still Remains, and 1997 on their first full headlining US tour. They also joined Alesana, Idiot Pilot, and The Number Twelve Looks Like You at the end of November. They filled in for Escape the Fate at the Australian Taste of Chaos shows.

In March 2009, they toured with Alesana, I Set My Friends on Fire, and Fear Before.

They then headlined "The Hot N' Heavy Tour" with support from He Is Legend, Before Their Eyes, and And Then There Were None. On the second half of the tour Eyes Set to Kill, Watchout! There's Ghosts, and Defending The Pilot joined in.

They went on tour again on October 9, 2009, in support of Blessthefall and Finch on the Atticus tour.

In the summer of 2010, they headlined a tour with bands such as Scarlett O'Hara, Attila, Woe, Is Me, and Abandon All Ships.

On August 19, 2011, Stillman confirmed that Drop Dead, Gorgeous was on hiatus because each member was busy with other projects such as ManCub, The Bunny the Bear, Curses and It's Teeth. Although there were pictures that showed some members were already getting together writing music for the next album, the release of new music as Drop Dead, Gorgeous seemed unlikely.

In January 2012, Daniel Stillman and Danny Cooper confirmed that they were in an alternative rock project called Bleach Blonde, signed under Rise Records. They released a three-track, self-titled EP on January 22, 2013.

As of early 2013, their Facebook account had been deleted and their Twitter account now only promotes Stillman's electronica project, giving indication that members of Drop Dead, Gorgeous had no plans of continuing involvement of the band.

In October 2021, the bar that Kyle Browning worked for tweeted that he had suddenly died.

Social media accounts for the band were created on July 10, 2024. That same day, a hometown reunion show was announced for December 28, 2024.

== Musical style ==
AllMusic categorized the band's sound as metalcore, post-hardcore, and heavy metal. Kerrang! also called them metalcore, and referred to them as a "Myspace band" due to their popularity during what the publication described as the "golden age" of the social media platform. Similarly, Loudwire called them "fashioncore", while admitting that the term "actually isn’t really a subgenre of hardcore at all" and that it "was coined as an insult to hardcore kids who started caring more about how they dyed their hair than the actual music."

Drop Dead, Gorgeous cited influences including Underoath, From First to Last, Anatomy of a Ghost, the Fall of Troy, Fear Before, the Chariot, Norma Jean, the Bled, Thursday, Taking Back Sunday, Jimmy Eat World, Saves the Day, New Found Glory and Green Day.

== Band members ==
Current members

- Daniel "Stills" Stillman – lead vocals, keyboards, programming, additional guitars (2004–2011, 2024–present)
- Jake Hansen – bass (2004–2011, 2024–present)
- Danny Cooper – drums, percussion (2004–2011, 2024–present)
- Jacob Belcher – rhythm guitar (2010–2011, 2025–present)
- River Wilde – lead guitar (2025–present)

Former members

- Aaron Rothe – keyboards, programming, percussion, vocals (2004–2007)
- Marcus Tallitsch – unclean vocals (2004)
- Wyatt Olney – rhythm guitar, clean vocals (2004)
- Judah Leary – rhythm guitar, backing vocals (2006–2007)
- Daniel Passera – drums (2006–2007)
- Kyle Browning – lead guitar, keyboards, programming, backing vocals (2004–2011; died 2021)
- Dan Gustavson – rhythm guitar (2004–2006, 2007–2010, 2011)
- Jonathan "Duck" Leary – keyboards, programming, percussion, backing vocals (2007–2011)

== Discography ==
Studio albums

- In Vogue (Rise, 2006)
- Worse Than a Fairy Tale (Suretone, 2007)
- The Hot N' Heavy (Suretone, 2009)

EPs

- Be Mine, Valentine (Rise, 2006)
- Daggers (The Artery Foundation, 2026)

Compilations

- In Vogue / Be Mine, Valentine (Rise, 2007)

Singles

- Drop Dead, Gorgeous (Rise/Suretone, 2006)
- They'll Never Get Me (Word With You) (Suretone, 2007)
- Six Feet (The Artery Foundation, 2025)
- Burn (The Artery Foundation, 2025)
