= Wil Francis =

American singer

William Francis
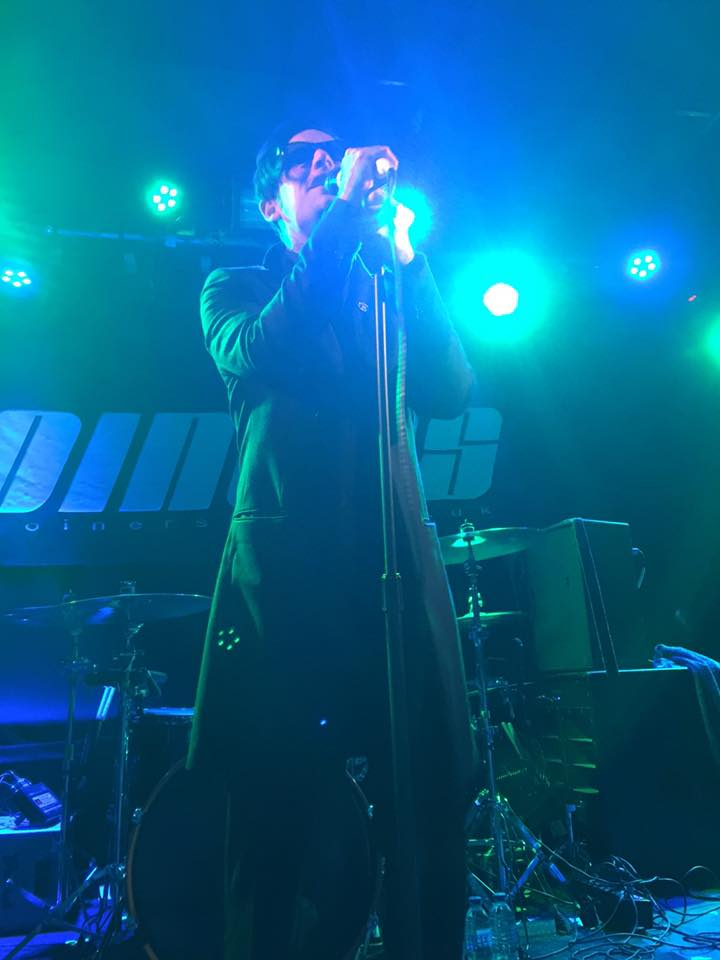
- Francis in 2016

Background information
- Born: William Roy Francis; January 8, 1982 (age 44); Kent, Washington, U.S.
- Genres: Melodic hardcore; horror punk; post-hardcore; gothic rock; screamo; synthpop; electronica; darkwave
- Occupations: Singer, songwriter, producer, author, artist
- Years active: 2003–present
- Member of: William Control
- Formerly of: Aiden
- Website: williamcontrol.com

William Roy "wiL" Francis (a.k.a. William Control) (born January 8, 1982) is an American musician. He came to prominence as the lead vocalist and principal songwriter of the horror punk band Aiden.

== Career ==
Francis joined the original lineup of Aiden in 2003 as their bassist and replaced Steve Clemens as lead vocalist later that year. He became the creative force behind Aiden and, for the 2015 final album and tours, was the only member of the original lineup still in the band. During Aiden's hiatus from 2012 to 2015, Francis' primary musical output was William Control, and he has returned to this project full-time.

He has also released four albums (Hate Culture, Noir, Silentium Amoris, and The Neuromancer) under the name William Control, featuring a synthesizer driven darkwave, synth-pop style, as well as two live albums (Live in London Town and Babylon, two acoustic albums (Skeleton Strings and Skeleton Strings 2), an EP (Novus Ordo Seclorum), and a remix album (Remix). The fifth album, Revelations, has been split into four EPs: The Pale EP (October 2016), The Black EP (February 2017), and The Red EP (July 2017) and The White EP (November 2017).

Francis also acts as producer to bands such as Fearless Vampire Killers, A Midnight Tragedy and Ashestoangels, as well as producing his own William Control and Aiden music, and formed his own record label, Control Records. In May 2009, Kerrang! called Francis "one of the most enigmatic and talismanic frontmen in rock music today."

He has released two books of poetry (Flowers & Filth (with Lisa Johnson) (2009) and Prose + Poems (2011)), and three novels (Revelator Book One: The Neuromancer (2013), Revelator Book Two: The Hate Culture (2014), and Revelator Book Three: The Hell of Heaven (2016)). The latter two make up part of a trilogy. In spring 2016, it was revealed that a trilogy of films was to be made from the Revelator books.

== Sexual assault allegations ==
In 2018, Francis was accused of multiple rapes and the organization of a sex cult. According to accusations made by multiple women, Francis only purported to practice BDSM; in fact, they claim, he physically and emotionally abused women, ordered many of them to get matching tattoos of his initials, and even demanded contracts from his sexual partners or “slaves,” signed in their own blood. An excerpt from a pledge obtained by The Daily Beast reads, “My body is His to use in any way He should choose, and I will never object to any actions He chooses to perform, or have myself perform on Him. There is no limitation to what kind of pain I am willing to endure for my Master.”

Controversy for his project William Control also occurred when he faced more accusations of creating a "sex cult" that included sexual abuse, date rape, extortion, grooming underage girls, and the tattooing of his name and initials on girls' genitalia as a form of "branding". Francis has denied all allegations and the police declined to prosecute.

== Discography ==
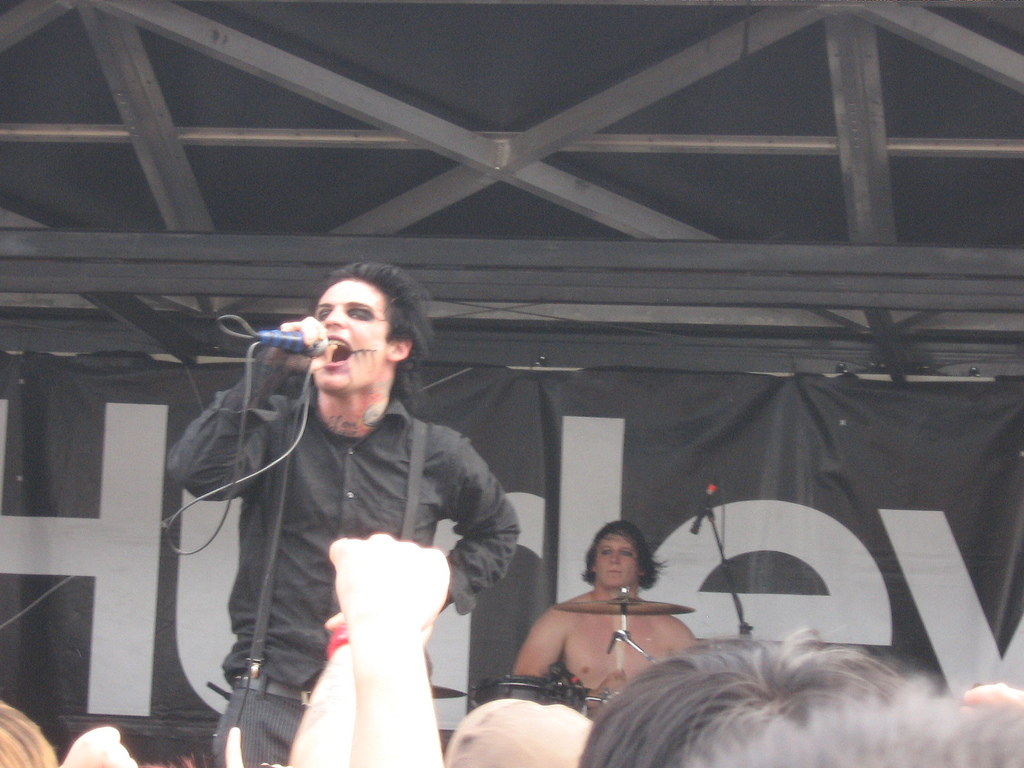
Francis performing in 2006

=== Aiden ===
- A Split of Nightmares - split EP with Stalins War (2004)
- Our Gangs Dark Oath (2004)
- Nightmare Anatomy (2005)
- Rain in Hell (2006)
- Conviction (2007)
- Knives (2009)
- From Hell... With Love (2010)
- Disguises (2011)
- Some Kind of Hate (2011)
- Aiden (2015)

=== William Control ===
==== Studio albums ====
- Hate Culture (2008)
- Noir (2010)
- Silentium Amoris (2012)
- The Neuromancer (2014)
- Revelations: (The Pale EP) (2016)
- Revelations: (The Black EP) (2017)
- Revelations: (The Red EP) (2017)
- Revelations: (The White EP) (2017)
- Sex Cult: Volume 1 (album) (2021)

==== EPs ====
- Novus Ordo Seclorum (2011)
- The Pale (2016)
- The Black (2017)
- The Red (2017)
- The White (2017)

==== Acoustic albums ====
- Skeleton Strings (2013)
- Skeleton Strings 2 (2014)

==== Live albums ====
- Live in London Town (2012)
- Babylon (2014)

==== Remix albums ====
- Remix (2014)

==== Other songs ====
- Deathclub (2009) - Underworld: Rise of the Lycans soundtrack
- The Posthumous Letter (2012) - Underworld: Awakening soundtrack

=== Collaborations ===
==== Guest appearances ====
- To Feel the Rain by On the Last Day, on the EP Wars Like Whispers (2005)
- Bleeds No More (live) by Silverstein, on their compilation 18 Candles: The Early Years (2006)
- Box Full of Sharp Objects (live) by The Used, during Taste Of Chaos 2007 (2007)
- Bleeding Rain by Vampires Everywhere!, on the album Kiss the Sun Goodbye (2011)
- Now That You're Dead by The Used, on the album Vulnerable (2012)
- We Join Forces by Mister Underground (2012)
- Voice of F.E.A.R. on the album Wretched and Divine: The Story of the Wild Ones, by Black Veil Brides (2013)
- Bury a Legend by One Last Shot, on the album Bastards of the Plague (2013)
- Pure Fucking Evil by Blood on the Dance Floor, on the album Bitchcraft (2014)
- Neon in the Dance Halls and City Falls to Dust by Fearless Vampire Killers, on the album Unbreakable Hearts
- Living Hell by Ashestoangels, on the album Horror Cult

==== Production ====
- The album I Tried to Make You Immortal, You Tried to Make Me a KILLER by the New Jersey rock band A Midnight Tragedy
- The EP Revenge by Seattle band Girl On Fire
- EPs The Ghost and Through the Rain by Seattle-based rock band To Paint the Sky
- The albums With Tape and Needles, Horror Cult and How to Bleed for English electro-goth punks Ashestoangels.
- The album Mile End by the Austrian punk band Stupe-iT
- The album Unbreakable Hearts for English rock band Fearless Vampire Killers

== Bibliography ==
- Flowers & Filth (with Lisa Johnson) (2009)
- Prose + Poems (2011)
- Revelator Book One: The Neuromancer (2013)
- Revelator Book Two: The Hate Culture (2014)
- Revelator Book Three: The Hell of Heaven (2016)
