= Alt-Fest =

Alternative music and lifestyle festival

Coordinates: 52.424°N 0.6476°W

- "The world's largest celebration of alternative culture, music, art and lifestyles"
- Genre: Metal, rock, industrial, EBM, goth
- Dates: 15–17 August 2014
- Locations: Kettering, Northamptonshire, England
- Years active: 2014
- Founders: Dominic and Michele Alesworth

Alt-Fest was a crowd-sourced alternative music and lifestyle festival, intended to run from 2014 onwards at Boughton Estate, Kettering, England. The inaugural festival promised six stages and 180 bands, held over a three-day period. Headlining acts included Marilyn Manson, VNV Nation and The Cult; also due to appear were Fields of the Nephilim, Gary Numan, The Last Cry, Arch Enemy and Amen. Instead, the event was cancelled due to lack of funding, with the controlling company consequently going into liquidation.

== History ==
The initial idea for Alt-Fest was formed by Dom and Missy Void, then organisers of gothic/industrial fetish event, Club AntiChrist. Expressing disillusionment with other festival experiences, they believed that giving ticket purchasers a greater say in facilities and band lineups would result in a much better event. They formed Alt-Fest Limited, which became incorporated in October 2012. The same year Dom and Missy launched an appeal for donations, including an early ticket scheme known as 'Dismembership', which raised over £10,000. This was followed by a Kickstarter campaign in 2013, which raised an additional £61,000 in seed funding.

In addition to the main stage on which Marilyn Manson was due to perform, there would have been separate stages for industrial/electronica (Front 242, Suicide Commando, Covenant), metal (Paradise Lost, Satyricon, Cradle of Filth), and goth (Peter Murphy, Alien Sex Fiend, The Damned, Clan Of Xymox, Diary Of Dreams, Skeletal Family). The fifth and sixth stages would have been dedicated to S.O.P.H.I.E. and steampunk. Daytime facilities would have included art installations, an alternative shopping village, themed woodland walks, and children's entertainments. A circus bigtop was planned with daytime and (less family-friendly) evening performances by the Circus of Horrors; there would also have been DJs and club nights. A dozen bars were planned to provide beers and real ales, including a milkshake bar, absinthe bar, and 'vampire' bar; also a tea room, chill-out areas, and a travelling library.

The greenfield location at Boughton Estate was announced in February 2013. It would support up to 20,000 visitors, and allow for an 'immersive' experience with art installations and sculptures throughout the site. Ticket prices varied depending on how close to the event they were purchased; typically around £145 for weekend camping tickets with day tickets selling for £57. Children's tickets (aged 13–15) were £50, with free entry for those under 13.

== Early controversies ==
The Alt-Fest online presence came together in August 2012, in the form of a website, Facebook group and Twitter account. They quickly became key resources for discussions and polls on what festival goers would be interested in. However, early criticism that the event might be too large for its first year or might not have the necessary funding appeared to be dismissed, or even removed.

In January 2014, there was a dispute over whether industrial band KMFDM had been booked to play Alt-Fest.

On 20 June 2014, just two months before the start of the event, Alt-Fest attempted to raise £400,000 through the business loan and equity platform Funding Tree. When queried, Alt-Fest reported that it was an old funding pitch placed in error.

== Cancellation ==
Initial rumours of cancellation began circulating on 29 July 2014, following online comments from Simon Hall of metal band Beholder, and Rob Ferguson, manager for Fields of the Nephilim and The Howling. Hall, who had been booked to headline the S.O.P.H.I.E. Stage on the Saturday evening, stated that he had received the news via text message, and then spoken with some of the main stage acts who confirmed the cancellation. Marilyn Manson, Cradle of Filth, Fields of the Nephilim, Killing Joke and Combichrist then confirmed the cancellation via their respective websites and Facebook pages.

Alt-Fest made no official comment for more than 24 hours, amid accusations that questions were being deleted from their Facebook page and official website. The pre-pitched tent retailer for the festival marked the event as 'finished'. After 30 hours, a brief statement was made that they were "working all hours to deal with some extremely challenging and stressful issues"; they apologised for the silence and confirmed a full statement would be made before Monday 4 August.

The full statement appeared on Friday 1 August, confirming event cancellation and detailing the nature of the problem. The organisers estimated £1.7 million was required for the event, but had only sold 7,600 tickets, with a further 3,000 needed to break even. Dom and Missy argued the cancellation was caused by poor ticket sales and an inability to secure necessary funding. A costing error and poor advice, both made in the early planning stages, were also blamed. They offered further apologies for their lack of communication with ticket buyers and artists, and announced that they would be entering liquidation. Alt-Fest and their primary ticketing agency, Clubtickets, confirmed that refunds would be available for online bookings made through the official website.

A creditors meeting for Alt-Fest Limited was held on 21 August 2014. There, Alt-Fest and their insolvency practitioners confirmed that they had been unable to contact Clubtickets since 4 August. Everyone owed money was being treated as an unsecured creditor, with no secured creditors or claims from employees. The overall budget for all Alt-Fest bands was said to be around £800,000. Marilyn Manson had received a £100,000 deposit for his scheduled performance, but remained a creditor as he was owed more. One festival food vendor, Deli Kate, was known to have lost £2,500 in pitch and trading costs. Dom and Missy were paid £6,400 each over the two-year period in which the event was organised, and had also received a £21,546 director's loan. The liquidator stated that they had no visible means to pay this back, and would in all probability have to file for personal bankruptcy as a result.

== Refunds and alternative events ==
Whilst Amazon, PayPal and Festicket were quick to refund ticket purchasers, refunds directly from Alt-Fest were not a possibility. A Facebook group named Where is my money? ALT-FEST 2014 was created on 30 July, followed by People who are owed money from ALT-FEST, created on 13 August. Used to speculate on unfolding events, they allowed people to exchange information on how best to successfully claim back money from their banks.

A third forum, Save Our AltFest, was used to spin off the Alt-Fest Steampunk Experience into a separate event. Further independently arranged replacement events included a three-day Ctrl - Alt-Fest - Delete festival running across Kettering that included Zeitgeist Zero, Christine Plays Viola, Black Acid Souls, The Cureheads, a three-day goth/industrial event from Flag Promotions named S.O.S. Festival, and a one-day metal event dubbed Haltfest.

On 4 September 2014, Clubtickets resumed communication by sending an email to ticket purchasers. It confirmed, as expected, that as a result of Alt-Fest they too had entered into creditors' voluntary liquidation. The same month, Dom and Missy passed Club AntiChrist over to a new organiser. (They remained involved with flyer and website promotion, as well as the booking of acts.)

== Intended 2014 lineup ==
The final publicised lineup was as follows (main bands highlighted in bold):

Stage	Friday	Saturday	Sunday
Main stage	**VNV Nation**, **Fields of the Nephilim**, **Killing Joke**, Dead Kennedys, Dope Stars Inc., Gothminster, Protafield, Methedreame	**Marilyn Manson**, **Gary Numan**, **Amen**, Fearless Vampire Killers, Truckfighters, Black Futures, Steak, Jindivik	**The Cult**, **Arch Enemy**, **Combichrist**, Eisbrecher, Peter Hook & The Light, Blutengel, New Device, Fuckshovel
Industrial/electronica stage	**Front 242**, **Mesh**, **Faderhead**, Agonoize, Rotorsand, Zeromancer, William Control, Parade Ground, V2A, K-Bereit, Kommand+Kontrol	**Suicide Commando**, **Nachtmahr**, **[:SITD:]**, Soman, SAM, XP8, Eisenfunk, Deviant UK, Tenek, System:FX, K-Nitrate	**Covenant**, **Leæther Strip**, **Aesthetic Perfection**, Alien Vampires, Memmaker, Unter Null, Krystal System, Inertia, Global Citizen, Alterred, Pretty Addicted, Digicore
Metal stage	**Paradise Lost**, **The Defiled**, **Onslaught**, My Ruin, Mono Inc., Dead Harts, Skarlett Riot, Jensen, Sanctorum	**Satyricon**, **God Seed**, **Heart of a Coward**, Savage Messiah, Revoker, Krokodil, No Consequence, Hawk Eyes, The One Hundred	**Cradle of Filth**, **The Howling**, **Finntroll**, Breed 77, Malefice, Palm Reader, Primitai
Gothic stage	**Peter Murphy**, **Theatre of Hate**, **Skeletal Family**, Marionettes, Pretentious Moi?, Soror Dolorosa, The Exploding Boy, Luna Reign	**Alien Sex Fiend**, **Clan of Xymox**, **The Beauty of Gemina**, The KVB, The Eden House, She Past Away, Rubella Ballet, The Last Cry, 13 Candles	**The Damned**, **Diary of Dreams**, **The March Violets**, Whispers in the Shadow, Attrition, Cold in Berlin, Christine Plays Viola, Zeitgeist Zero
S.O.P.H.I.E. stage	Senser, Godsized, Beholder, Stereo Juggernaut, Resin, November-7, Collisions, Skreamer, Spirytus, Die So Fluid, Bad Pollyanna, Je$us Loves Amerika, The Self Titled, Enemo-J, Generation Graveyard, Seven Deadly, I, Spawn of Psychosis, Collapse, Bull-Riff Stampede, Spit Like This, Soldierfield, Vivid Nation, Paresis, Kremated, 44 Fires, Wretched Soul, Stormbringer, Black Acid Souls, The Cureheads, Petrol Bastard, Blacken the Name, Maxdmyz, Sinnergod, Crashgate		
Steampunk Experience	BB Blackdog, Birthrite, Crimson Clocks, Gladstone, Metropolis, Professor Elemental, Seas of Mirth, Skorbut, Daniel Malheur, Birdeatsbaby, The Steampunkfunk Bizarre, The Wattingers, The Shanklin Freak Show, Whiskey Bob Shaker, Aeronautica, Frenchy and the Punk, Jezebel Steele, The Dark Design, Miss Von Trapp, DH Lawrence, The Mysterious Freakshow, The King Bains, Needle Poppets, Red Ruff		
DJs	DJ 69, DJ Angel, DJ Cyberchrist, DJ d.Void, DJ Hive, DJ Jo the Waiter, DJ Kohl, Flame, DJ Martin Oldgoth, DJ Sinbad, DJ Steve Nine, DJ Vade Retro, DJ Brad		
Clubs	Vampire Party, Club AntiChrist, Slimelight, Dead of Night, Reptile, Shenanigans, Nocturnal Emissions, Analogue Trash		
Circus Bigtop	The Circus of Horrors, Dee Christopher, Joe Black, Rock It Dance, Hélène Atsüko, The Abominable Stiltwalkers, Pyromaniac Fire Arts, Conte Lumiere, State of Bliss, Vicky Butterfly, "plus many more performers, speaker and acts"		

== See also ==
- List of industrial music festivals
- List of gothic festivals
- Gothic music
