= Silentium Amoris =

Studio album by William Control
- Released: April 2, 2012
- Recorded: The Control Room
- Genre: Darkwave, synthpop
- Length: 48:00
- Label: Control Records
- Producer: William Control

William Control chronology
Novus Ordo Seclorum (2011)	Silentium Amoris (2012)	Live In London Town (2013)

Singles from Silentium Amoris
- 1. "Kiss Me Judas" Released: March 27, 2012

Silentium Amoris, the third studio album by William Control, was released on April 2, 2012 through Control Records. It was produced and engineered by William Control, and mixed by Justin Armstrong. Recording and mixing took place at the Control Room in January/February 2012. A video for the only single, Kiss Me Judas, was released on YouTube, although a video was also released for The Velvet Warms And Binds. A portion of the proceeds from the album was donated to the Ryther Treatment Center, where Francis lived for a time as a teenager.

== Track listing ==
All tracks are written by William Control and Kenneth Fletcher, except where noted.

No.	Title	Music	Length
1.	"Achtung"	Doug Wright	1:23
2.	"We Are Lovers"		3:33
3.	"Kiss Me Judas"		4:21
4.	"I Am Your Jesus"		3:36
5.	"The Velvet Warms And Binds"		4:59
6.	"Letters To The Other Side"		3:42
7.	"Come Die With Me"		4:27
8.	"Atmosphere"	Ian Curtis, Bernard Sumner, Peter Hook, Stephen Morris	4:13
9.	"Omnia Vincit Amor"		4:33
10.	"Romance & Devotion"		3:57
11.	"True Love Will Find You In The End"	Daniel Johnston	2:04
12.	"Failure Of All Mankind"		5:12
13.	"Silentium Amoris"	Oscar Wilde	1:22
Total length:			48:00

== Trivia ==
- The title of track 1 is German for 'attention', while the titles of tracks 9 and 13 are Latin for 'love conquers all' and 'silence of love', respectively.
- Achtung is actually dialogue taken from the 2000 film Quills, inspired by the life and work of the Marquis de Sade.
- Kiss Me, Judas is the first novel in a trilogy by American author Will Christopher Baer, and the storyline for the video for I'm Only Human Sometimes from Control's previous album Noir is based on the book's plot.
- Track 8 is a Joy Division cover.
- Track 11 is a Daniel Johnston cover.
- Track 13 is a poem by Oscar Wilde

== Credits ==
- Photography: Lisa Johnson
- Art direction: DoubleJ - liveevildesigns.com
