= William Control =

American music project

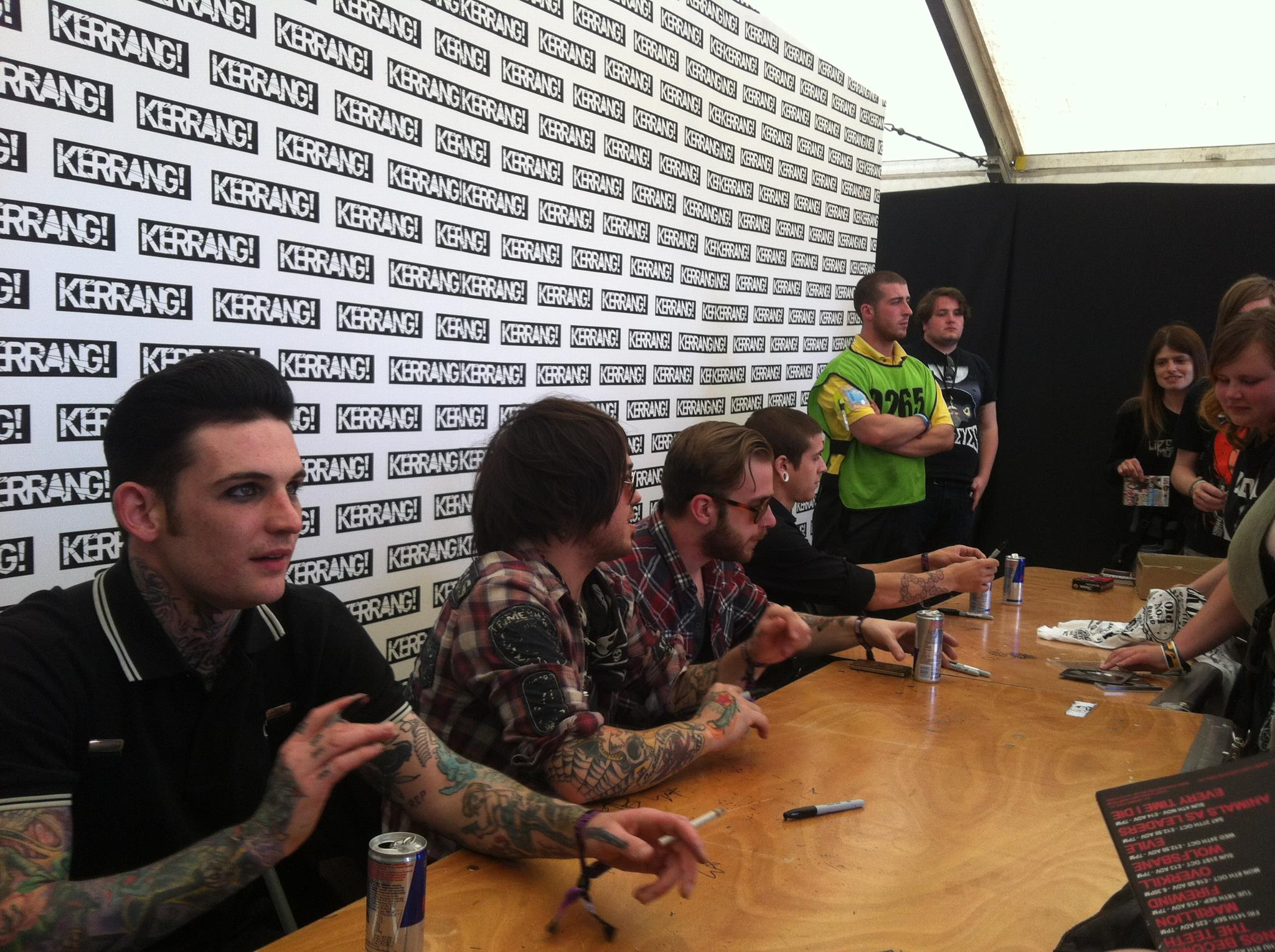
- William Control at Download Festival 2012

Background information
- Origin: Seattle, Washington, U.S.
- Genres: Dark wave; synth-pop; gothic rock
- Years active: 2008–2017; 2020–present
- Labels: Control; Victory
- Spinoffs: The Neuromantic Boys
- Spinoff of: Aiden
- Members: William Control
- Past members: Kenneth Fletcher; Ian MacWilliams
- Website: williamcontrol.com

William Control is an American music project founded in 2008 in Seattle, Washington. It was the side project of Aiden's William Francis before Aiden's hiatus, and he later operated as William Control full-time. 'William Control' therefore refers to both the band as a whole and to Francis as his stage name. Francis was signed to Victory Records before starting his own independent label, Control Records, and, as William Control, has released five full-length albums (Hate Culture, Noir, Silentium Amoris, The Neuromancer and Revelations (split into four separate EPs)), an EP (Novus Ordo Seclorum), two acoustic albums (Skeleton Strings and Skeleton Strings 2), two live DVDs (Live in London Town and Babylon) and a remix album (Remix). The first part of Revelations, The Pale, was released on October 14, 2016. The second EP The Black followed on February 17, 2017, and the third, entitled The Red, followed that with a release date of July 14 of the same year. The album was completed by The White on November 24.

As of The Neuromancer Francis referred to his band as 'The Neuromantic Boys', and the 'Boys' most recently consisted of Kenneth Fletcher (who has been a part of the William Control project since Hate Culture) and Ian MacWilliams, with Crilly Ashes standing in for Fletcher for some of 2017's live shows. Control announced his retirement from music/touring in October 2017, stating that he was going to concentrate on his clothing businesses and Control Records. In June 2018, Control temporarily ceased work due to accusations of sexual assault and the formation of a "sex cult" with women, some of whom were fans of his.

== History ==
=== 2008 ===
William Control's debut album, Hate Culture, was released in 2008, and is, according to a Kerrang! magazine interview, the story of a character named William Control and his last night on earth before he kills himself. Hate Culture peaked at No. 12 on the Billboard Electronic Albums chart and No. 43 on the Heatseekers chart. The band released a video for Beautiful Loser, the album's only single, and then toured with Escape the Fate on their This War Is Ours Tour in late 2008. Their live debut was at Revolution in the Bronx, New York City on September 26, 2008.

=== 2009–2010 ===
In 2009, Control began working on a new William Control album, Noir, which eventually surfaced on June 8, 2010. He invited friends (including Ash Costello of Orange County rock band New Years Day and Jeffree Star) and fans to come up to the studio and record vocals for part of the album. While it did not appear on Noir, a teaser video for the song "Deathclub" (a song that has only been released as a remix and has yet to be heard in its original form) was released on Control's social networking sites. The original track is actually an outtake from the Hate Culture sessions. The sole single from Noir was "I'm Only Human Sometimes"

Later in 2010 Control released a series of spoken word tracks through iTunes, all works by Edgar Allan Poe. These were "Eleonora" (July 13), "The Tell-Tale Heart" (September 13), "The Oval Portrait" (October 15), and "The Raven" (October 30). The band supported Black Veil Brides on their Entertainment Or Death Tour.

Shortly after the release of Noir, Control left Victory Records, and founded his own record company, Control Records, based near Seattle, Washington. He now records all his music under this label.

=== 2011 ===
On November 29, 2011, a new five-track EP entitled Novus Ordo Seclorum was released. The physical copies came with a bonus track, a cover of "1963" by New Order. On the same day Control published a second book, Prose + Poems, having previously published Flowers & Filth with Lisa Johnson.

=== 2012 ===
Early 2012 saw an announcement that the band's third full-length album would be released on April 2, 2012, and be called Silentium Amoris.

The band performed on the Fight To Unite US Tour, with Brokencyde and Blood on the Dance Floor in April and May 2012. In June 2012, William Control headlined their own New Faith Tour, playing shows in the UK, the Netherlands, and France. During this tour, they also headlined the Red Bull stage at Donington's Download Festival. A music video for the only single from Silentium Amoris, "Kiss Me Judas", was released on June 26, 2012 on YouTube.

In August and September 2012, William Control filmed their debut live DVD, Live In London Town, directed by Tim Bullock and produced by A Glass Half. The film features a live show, shot at the O2 Academy Islington, as well as behind-the-scenes footage and interviews from two other dates. The twenty-track DVD was released in January 2013, with a new and previously unreleased 21st track, "Speak To Me Of Abduction", over the closing credits.

October and November 2012 saw the band supporting The Birthday Massacre on their American tour, alongside Aesthetic Perfection.

=== 2013 ===
William Control appeared as special guest on The Church Of The Wild Ones US Tour with Black Veil Brides in early 2013. Control also starred in the film Legion of the Black, a movie based on the Black Veil Brides album Wretched and Divine.

February saw Control making an appearance on the Kerrang! Tour 2013, performing a brief DJ set each night.

In March 2013, Control released Skeleton Strings, his first acoustic album. Download only, it is a mixture of his own tracks and cover versions. Fans received it for a donation towards the costs of building his new studio and recording what became The Neuromancer. Artists covered included HIM, Placebo, Morrissey and The Smiths.

March also saw the appearance of a video for "The Velvet Warms And Binds", off Silentium Amoris. In November, William Control headlined the Friday night at Whitby Goth Weekend, after playing a support slot at the festival in April.

On October 1, 2013 Control announced that the next studio album would be called The Neuromancer, and that it was slated for release in early December 2013, just before the start of the US Revel Without A Cause Tour. Additionally, Control announced that his book Revelator Book One: The Neuromancer would be shipped earlier than expected and likely within the first two weeks of the month. The book was initially sold exclusively through pre-order, in a limited quantity of 500. However, the pre-orders sold so quickly that an additional 100 copies were made available shortly thereafter. It is now available in paperback and digital form.

=== 2014 ===
The Neuromancer was finally released April 4, 2014. There were two singles from the album, "Revelator" and "Price We Pay", although the album itself was preceded on March 23 by a lyric video for Illuminator.

In spring 2014, and again from October–December 2014, William Control supported the aggrotech band Combichrist on both the American and European legs of their We Love You Tour. In April 2014, whilst on this tour, the band recorded a live DVD at Bar Sinister in Hollywood. This DVD was released as Babylon, and featured Andy Biersack of Black Veil Brides and Ash Costello of New Years Day. Once again, this DVD was directed by Tim Bullock and produced by A Glass Half.

William Control played a UK tour, entitled The Punishment Tour, in August 2014, with support from Ashestoangels and Bad Pollyanna. An appearance at Alt-Fest 2014 was originally part of this tour, but the festival was cancelled.

November 2014 saw the release of Revelator Book Two: The Hate Culture. This was again initially through Control's own website, but it is also now available both in paperback and digitally from various sources. A second acoustic album, Skeleton Strings 2, followed on Christmas Eve.

It was around this time that the new William Control velvet rose logo was launched, inspired by lyrics from Adore (Fall In Love Forever), off The Neuromancer. It has appeared in various forms on releases and merchandise since then.

An album of remixes of William Control tracks (Remix) was also made available, as a free download through NoiseTrade.

=== 2015 ===
At the start of 2015, Francis announced that he was starting his own screen-printing business, Control Merch, to give him creative freedom over his own merchandise. This was initially in a rented studio, but in early 2016 he purchased his own shop, allowing for expansion of the business. He also launched the brand Submit Clothing.

The Punishment Tour part 2 took place in April 2015 (UK) and May–June 2015 (US). Support came from Ashestoangels in the UK and Requiem and Justin Symbol in the US. The band once again performed at Whitby Goth Weekend, this time on the Sunday night, playing before The Damned. The band did one final 2015 live show at Toronto's Aftermath Festival in August 2015.

=== 2016 ===
Francis began teasing fans with snippets of new music from the fifth studio album in video clips on Instagram and Facebook. He worked on the album with Kenneth Fletcher and Axel Otero of Lay Your Ghost at his home studio in spring and summer of 2016.

He embarked on a solo five-date acoustic tour of the UK (The Skeleton Strings Tour) in July 2016, supported by Crilly of Ashestoangels, and the full band returned to the UK in September 2016 for the ten-date Synths And Sinners Tour.

"The Monster", the first single from the band's The Pale EP (the first of four that make up the album Revelations), was released as a YouTube video on September 5. Pre-orders for the EP through the Control Merch site began on September 22, with iTunes pre-orders starting the following day. Several US dates for October and November 2016 were then announced, after the planned full US tour fell through, including a performance on JBTV. The Pale, completed by tracks "Confess", "When The Love Is Pain" and "Mother Superior", received its full release on October 14, 2016. A video for "Confess", filmed by Fletcher in Edinburgh, Scotland whilst on the Synths And Sinners Tour, followed on October 26, as did a video for "When The Love Is Pain" on November 12. The Pale hit number one on both the Billboard Dance/Electronic album chart and the Heatseekers album chart.

In spring 2016 it was revealed that a trilogy of films was to be made from the three Revelator books. In November 2016, posts appeared on Control's social media accounts about the third book in the Revelator trilogy, Revelator Book Three: The Hell Of Heaven. Pre-orders for the first edition went on sale on December 2, and sold out within a day.

In December, Francis announced the formation of his own street team, The Neuromantics, named after 'The Neuromantic Movement', a term he has coined himself. He also applied for a trademark on Submit Clothing; this was confirmed in January 2018.

=== 2017 ===
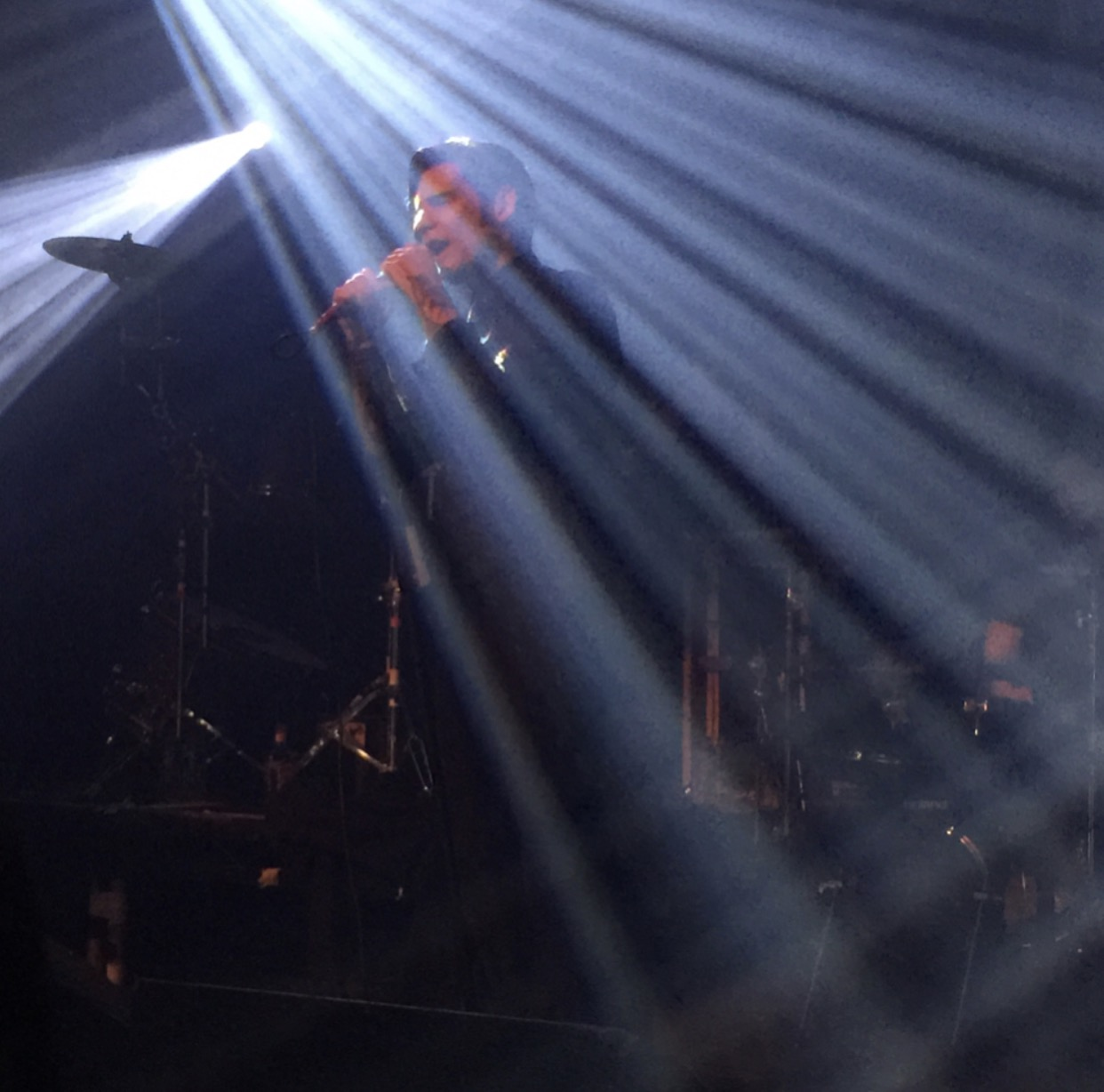
William Control live in London, 2017

The video for "Mother Superior", the final track on The Pale, was shot in Seattle and released on January 25, 2017. The band then played several American headline shows under the Synths & Sinners Tour title, before embarking on Andy Black of Black Veil Brides's Homecoming: The Curtain Call Tour as the main support act. This covered parts of both the United States and Canada, and continued from early February into March, finishing in Pomona, California on March 3.

The video for the first track on Revelations: The Black EP, "Analog Flesh In A Digital World", was released on February 10, 2017, and the EP followed on February 17. Pre-orders for the latter began through the Control Merch site on February 5. The Black hit number 6 on the Billboard Top Dance/Electronic album chart and number one on the Heatseekers album chart. A video for the track "Knife Play" was released on April 1, 2017, and one for "All I Need" followed on May 13.

In April 2017, the band completed a European tour supporting Aesthetic Perfection, with Crilly Ashes standing in for Kenneth Fletcher on keyboards. June, July and August saw them playing across the US on Warped 2017, again with Crilly Ashes. As part of this, Control also ran a daily TEI workshop on DIY in the music business. He also made an appearance at the APMAs, presenting the band New Years Day.

An "Introduction to Control Records" video was posted on YouTube on June 29. A Control Records sampler CD was handed out at Warped, and also made available for digital download. It includes a William Control cover of "Running Up That Hill" Kate Bush and "The Night Is Ours" by The Neuromantic Boys. The other artists featured are Black Blinds, Lay Your Ghost and The Secret Post.

Pre-orders for the third installment in the Revelations series, The Red, began through the Control Merch website (as well as on digital channels such as iTunes, Amazon and Spotify) on June 30, with the EP being released on July 14. It reached number 5 on the Billboard Dance/Electronic album chart and number one on the Heatseekers album chart.

A video for "Let Her Go" was released on September 6, 2017. A limited-edition signed hardcover book containing all three Revelator novels was also published.

In October, the band embarked upon the Graveyard Shift Tour, opening for Motionless in White. However, they left the tour before it finished, with Francis announcing his retirement from touring/music to concentrate on his clothing businesses and Control Records. This was after a wave of allegations went viral online, after multiple women accused William on incorrect BDSM practices, manipulation, coercive control and grooming. He did still promise the final installment of Revelations, in the form of The White. A lyric video for the track "Ghost" was published on November 13, but it proved to be the only video for this final EP.

The White was released on November 24. Guest vocalists included Axel Otero of Lay Your Ghost, Lvci (both signed to Control Records), and Crilly Ashes. This EP hit the top spot on the Billboard Dance/Electronic album and the Heatseekers album charts.

=== 2018 ===
On June 4, 2018, Francis announced the forthcoming release of a full Revelations LP that would combine all of the previous EP songs into a single album, along with two new songs. However, controversy occurred when Control faced more accusations of creating a "sex cult" that included sexual abuse, date rape, extortion, grooming underage girls, and the tattooing of his name and initials on girls' genitalia as a form of "branding". Faced with the accusations, on June 8 Control announced a cancellation of the album's release and the closure of Control Records to avoid affecting any other artists on the label. Several artists who had recently been signed to Control Records announced their departure in the wake of the accusations, with Daniel Graves of Aesthetic Perfection announcing that he would be re-releasing his collaboration "Rhythm + Control" with Control's vocals removed and 100 percent of the proceeds for the first six months donated to Planned Parenthood.

The complete Revelations LP was released on June 22, 2018. On October 11, 2018, Control released a music video for "All the Love", which had been featured on the album. The track was noted by his prior accusers to contain lyrics that suggested it was meant to taunt them and encourage them to commit suicide. On December 22, 2018, Control released an advertisement for a re-release of Hate Culture.

=== 2019 ===
Beginning on March 15, 2019, Control released a series of videos on YouTube confronting his accusations and presenting his side of the story and what he claims to be personal evidence. However, these accusations were not refuted.

=== 2020 ===
On October 31, Control released a new single in video form entitled "Abuse". In the posting it simple states, "And we begin a new adventure...", along with the lyrics.

=== 2021 ===
On April 16, 2021, Control released a six-track album titled Sex Cult, Vol. 1.

== Band members ==
- William "Control" Francis - lead vocals, piano, acoustic guitar, keyboards, synthesizers (2008–2017)

The Neuromantic Boys

The Boys got their name from lyrics from the track "Revelator", off The Neuromancer.

- Kenneth Fletcher - guitars (2008–2012), bass, backing vocals (2012–2017), synthesizers
- Ian MacWilliams - keyboards, synthesizers (2013–2017), backing vocals
- Crilly Ashes - live synthesizers, keyboards, backing vocals [2014 (UK tour), 2017 (European tour, Vans Warped Tour 2017)]
- Nick Rossi - drums (2017)

Former members

- Nick Wiggins - bass, backing vocals (2008–2012)
- Keef West - drums (2012)
- Philip Kross - bass, backing vocals (2012)
- Ben Tourkantonis - drums (2014–2017)

== Discography ==
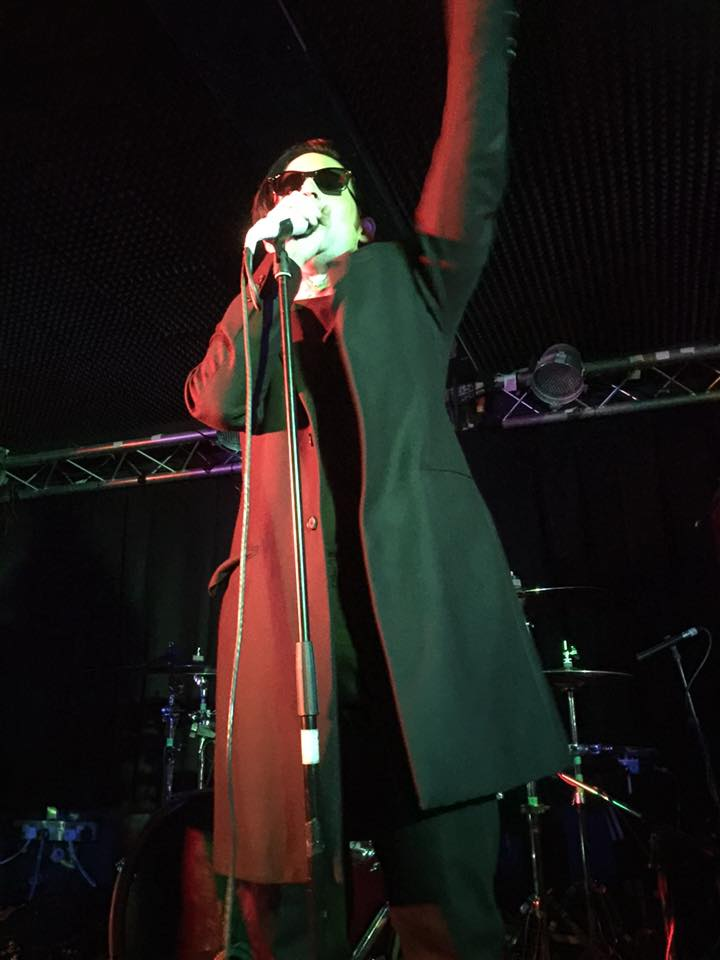
William Control performing in England, 2016

=== Studio albums ===
- Hate Culture (2008)
- Noir (2010)
- Silentium Amoris (2012)
- Skeleton Strings (2013)
- The Neuromancer (2014)
- Revelations (2018)
- Sex Cult, Vol. 1 (2021)

=== EPs ===
- Novus Ordo Seclorum (2011)
- Revelations: The Pale EP (2016)
- Revelations: The Black EP (2017)
- Revelations: The Red EP (2017)
- Revelations: The White EP (2017)

=== Acoustic albums ===
- Skeleton Strings (2013)
- Skeleton Strings 2 (2014)

=== Remix albums ===
- Remix (2014)

=== Live albums ===
- Live in London Town (2012)
- Babylon (2014)

=== Singles ===
- "Beautiful Loser" (2008)
- "I'm Only Human Sometimes" (2010)
- "Kiss Me Judas" (2012)
- "Revelator" (2014)
- "Price We Pay" (2014)
- "The Monster" (2016)
- "Confess" (2016)
- "When the Love Is Pain" (2016)
- "Mother Superior" (2017)
- "Analog Flesh in a Digital World" (2017)
- "Knife Play" (2017)
- "All I Need" (2017)
- "Let Her Go" (2017)
- "Ghost" (2017)
- "Abuse" (2020)
- “Baptized” (2021)

=== Music videos ===
- "Beautiful Loser" (2008)
- "Deathclub" (2009)
- "I'm Only Human Sometimes" (2010)
- "Kiss Me Judas" (2012)
- "Speak to Me of Abduction" (2012)
- "The Velvet Warms and Binds" (2013)
- "New World Order" (2013)
- "Revelator" (2014)
- "Price We Pay" (2014)
- "Illuminator" (lyric video) (2014)
- "The Monster" (2016)
- "Confess" (2016)
- "When the Love Is Pain" (2016)
- "Mother Superior" (2017)
- "Analog Flesh in a Digital World" (2017)
- "Knife Play" (2017)
- "All I Need" (2017)
- "Let Her Go" (2017)
- "Ghost" (lyric video) (2017)
- "Abuse" (2020)
- “Baptized” (2021)

=== Soundtrack contributions ===
- Saw V (2008) - "Strangers"
- Underworld: Rise of the Lycans (2009) - "Deathclub" (featuring Matt Skiba) (Wes Borland/Renholdër Remix)
- Underworld: Awakening (2012) - "The Posthumous Letter"
- Fucking Mystic (2014) - "Adore (Fall in Love Forever)"

== Bibliography ==
- Flowers & Filth (September 9, 2009) – a book of poetry and photography by William Control (words) and Lisa Johnson (photography). ISBN unknown.
- Prose + Poems (November 12, 2011) – a book of poetry, short pieces and essays by William Control. It was initially sold through Control's own website, and PDF copies were available as part of some of the Silentium Amoris pre-order packages. A couple of the passages were published on the Alternative Press website. ISBN unknown
- Revelator Book One: The Neuromancer (October 28, 2013) – the first in a trilogy of novels by William Control that explores the origins of the character of William Control. The books mirror the story told across the course of Control's albums. Pre-orders were initially made available through Control's own website and limited to 500 copies. A second and third editions were also released. ISBN 978-1-304-40272-1
- Revelator Book Two: The Hate Culture (2014) – the second in the trilogy. ISBN 978-1-304-40272-1
- Revelator Book Three: The Hell Of Heaven (2016) – the final part of the trilogy ISBN 978-1-387-18915-1
- Revelator (2017) - limited edition hardcover book containing all three novels.

== Collaborations ==
Guest appearances

- To Feel the Rain by On the Last Day, on the EP Wars Like Whispers (2005) (as Wil Francis)
- Bleeds No More (live) by Silverstein, on their compilation 18 Candles: The Early Years (2006) (as Wil Francis)
- Box Full of Sharp Objects (live) by The Used, during Taste of Chaos 2007 (2007) (as Wil Francis)
- Bleeding Rain by Vampires Everywhere!, on the album Kiss the Sun Goodbye (2011)
- Now That You're Dead by The Used, on the album Vulnerable (2012)
- We Join Forces by Mister Underground (2012)
- Voice of F.E.A.R. on the album Wretched and Divine: The Story of the Wild Ones, by Black Veil Brides (2013)
- Bury a Legend by One Last Shot, on the album Bastards of the Plague (2013)
- Pure Fucking Evil by Blood on the Dance Floor, on the album Bitchcraft (2014)
- Neon in the Dance Halls and City Falls to Dust by Fearless Vampire Killers, on the album Unbreakable Hearts (2014)
- Living Hell by Ashestoangels, on the album Horror Cult (2014)

== Production work ==
- The EP Revenge (2011) by Seattle band Girl On Fire
- EPs The Ghost (2011) and Through The Rain (2011) by Seattle-based dark rock band To Paint the Sky (as Wil Francis)
- The album I Tried to Make You Immortal, You Tried to Make Me a KILLER (2012) by the New Jersey rock band A Midnight Tragedy
- The album Mile End (2013) by the Austrian punk band Stupe-iT
- The albums With Tape and Needles (2013), Horror Cult (2014) and How to Bleed (2016) for English electro-goth punks Ashestoangels
- The album Unbreakable Hearts (2014) by English rock band Fearless Vampire Killers

== Tours ==
=== Headline ===
- Noir Tour - UK (July/August 2010) William Control with Mavricz and Octane Ok
- Live in London - UK (August/September 2012) William Control with Obscure Pleasures and Ashestoangels
- New Faith Tour - UK (May/June 2012) William Control with Fearless Vampire Killers and Obscure Pleasures
- UK Headliner - UK (April/May 2013) William Control with AlterRed
- Revel Without a Cause Tour - US (2013) William Control with Fearless Vampire Killers and Davey Suicide
- The Punishment Tour - UK/Europe (August 2014) William Control with Ashestoangels and Bad Pollyanna
- The Punishment Tour - UK (April 2015) William Control with Ashestoangels
- The Punishment Tour - US (2015) William Control with Requiem and Justin Symbol
- The Skeleton Strings Tour - UK (July 2016) acoustic William Control with Crilly Ashes
- The Synths And Sinners Tour - UK (2016) William Control with Bad Pollyanna, Pretty Addicted and As Sirens Fall
- The Synths And Sinners Tour - USA (October and November 2016) William Control with MXMS (November dates only)
- The Synths And Sinners Tour - USA (February 2017) William Control with Palaye Royale

=== Support/festivals ===
- The War Is Ours Tour - US (2008) Escape The Fate with William Control
- Fight To Unite Tour - US (2012) Brokencyde, Blood on the Dance Floor and William Control
- Entertainment Or Death Tour - US (2010) Black Veil Brides with William Control and Motionless in White
- June 3, 2012 - Melkweg, Powerfest
- June 10, 2012 - Donington Park, Download Festival
- The Birthday Massacre - US (2012) The Birthday Massacre with William Control and Aesthetic Perfection
- Church Of The Wild Ones Tour - US (2013) Black Veil Brides with William Control
- April 27, 2013 - Whitby Goth Weekend
- November 1, 2013 - Whitby Goth Weekend
- We Love You Tour - US (2014) Combichrist with William Control and New Years Day
- We Love You Tour Part 2 - US (2014) Combichrist with William Control, Davey Suicide and Darksiderz
- We Love You Tour - Europe (2014) Combichrist with William Control
- April 26, 2015 - Whitby Goth Weekend
- August 27, 2015 - Toronto, Aftermath Festival
- October 30, 2016 - supporting Prayers, Los Angeles, Mayan Theater
- February 2017 Homecoming Tour: Curtain Call - US/Canada (2017) Andy Black with William Control and Palaye Royale
- June - August 2017 Warped Tour 2017
- The Graveyard Shift Tour - US (2017) Motionless In White with The Amity Affliction, Miss May I and William Control
