= The White (William Control EP) =

Revelations: The White EP

EP by William Control
- Released: November 24, 2017
- Studio: Hell's Half Acre
- Genre: Darkwave; new wave; synthpop
- Length: 15:21
- Label: Control
- Producer: Kenneth Fletcher

William Control chronology
Revelations: The Red EP (2017)	Revelations: The White EP (2017)

Singles from Revelations: The White EP
- 1. "Ghost" Released: September 13, 2017

Revelations: The White EP is the final of four EPs that make up Revelations, the fifth studio album by American group William Control. The other three are The Pale, The Black and The Red, after the Four Horsemen of the Apocalypse. It is also the final ever William Control release, after Control announced his retirement in October 2017. The EP features appearances by Control Records artists Axel Otero of Lay Your Ghost and Lvci (on Bad Religion and The Sinner respectively), and also by Crilly Ashes on Bad Religion.

The White was released by Control Records on November 24, 2017 and peaked at 139 on the Billboard 200 chart (Control’s highest ever placing), and at number one on the Billboard Dance/Electronic Albums chart. It also hit number one on the Heatseekers chart, an accomplishment achieved by all four of the Revelations EPs.

The only video was a lyric video for Ghost, released on November 13.

The EP was recorded at Control's Hell's Half Acre studio in and was produced and engineered by Kenneth Fletcher, and engineered and mixed by Axel Otero of the band Lay Your Ghost. It was mastered by John Troxell. Fans were invited down to the Control Merch shop to record gang vocals.

== Track listing ==
No.	Title	Length
1.	"Bad Religion"	3:39
2.	"Ghost"	3:58
3.	"The Sinner"	3.42
4.	"Love Is Cruelty"	4:02
Total length:		15:21

== Personnel ==
All credits adapted from liner notes.

- Kenneth Fletcher – producer, engineer, artwork, layout
- Axel Otero – engineer, mixing
- John Troxell – mastering

== Charts ==
Chart (2017)	Peak position
US Billboard 200 (Billboard)	139
US Dance/Electronic Albums (Billboard)	1
US Heatseekers Albums (Billboard)	1
US Independent Albums (Billboard)	6
US Rock Albums (Billboard)	
