= Liberty Lies =

English hard rock band

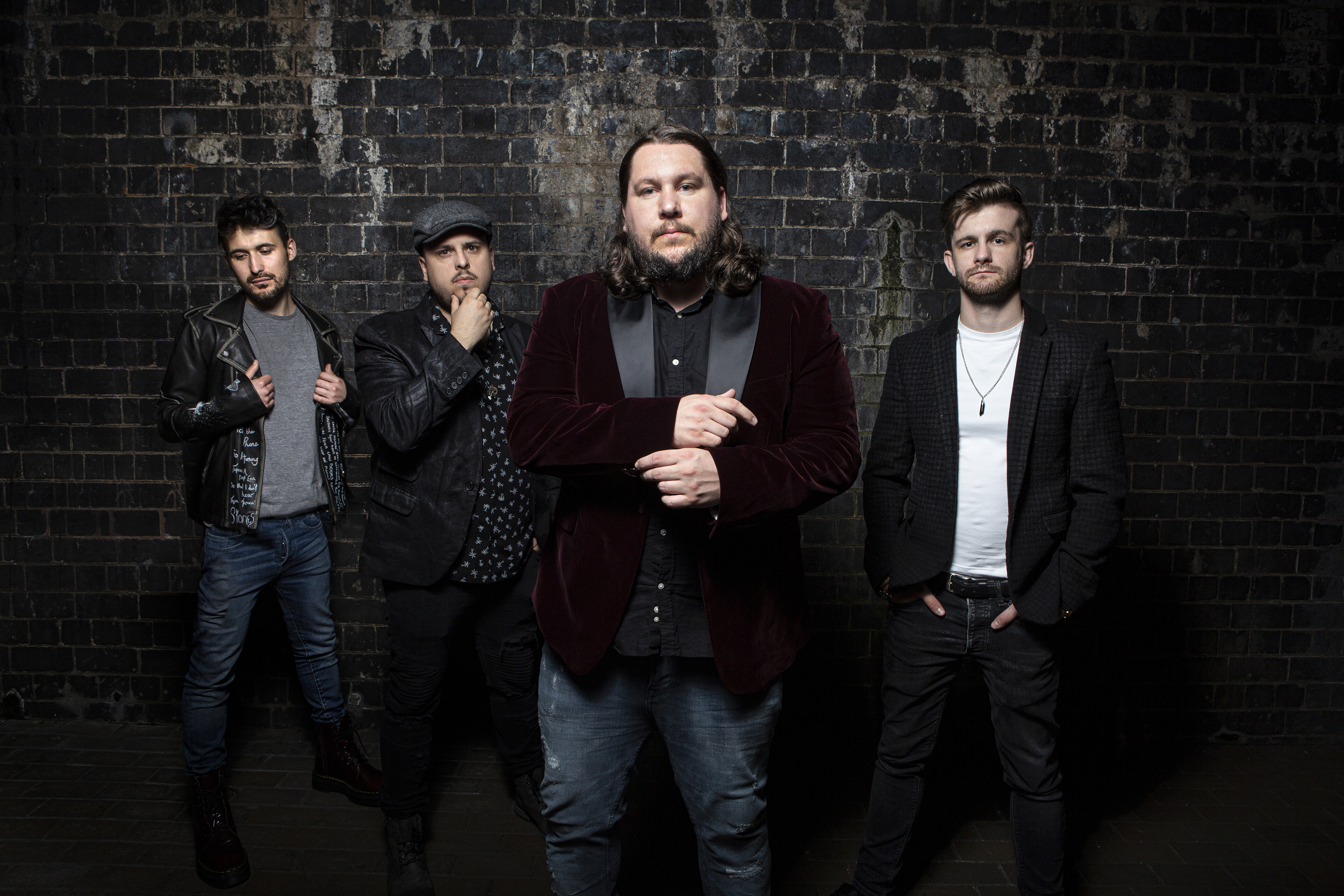
- Liberty Lies 2019

Background information
- Origin: Black Country, England
- Genres: Rock
- Years active: 2008–present
- Label: Self-released
- Members: Shaun Richards; Josh Pritchett; Adam Stevens; Liam 'Bill' Billings; Miles Bagshaw
- Website: libertyliesofficial.com

Liberty Lies are an English hard rock band formed in Wednesbury, West Midlands, England, in June 2008. The core and founding members of the band are Shaun Richards (lead vocals), Josh Pritchett (guitar) and Adam Stevens (drums). There have been a number of other members over the years, most notably Liam 'Bill' Billings (guitar, bass). Liberty Lies have released two studio albums and three EPs.

== History ==
=== Beginnings ===
Liberty Lies were formed in 2008 by Shaun Richards, Josh Pritchett, Adam Stevens, Matt Jones and Dan Newman after they had met at Wood Green High School.

The first couple of years were spent rocking up a storm across the UK with gigs, festivals and competitions. In November 2008, Liberty Lies reached the grand final of 'The Live Band of the Year' competition in Wolverhampton where, with only a small catalogue of original material, they achieved a second place. As time went on and the band began to grow they managed to get tours with bands such as; Magnum, Black Spiders, Slaves to Gravity, Towers of London and Richie Kotzen.

In December 2010, after receiving a maximum point score and being labelled "one of the best unsigned bands in the country" in the Highway 2 Hell competition in Glasgow, Liberty Lies earned themselves a slot in the line-up of Hard Rock Hell IV, alongside bands such as Airbourne; Saxon; UFO; Skid Row; Hardcore Superstar and many more.

=== New Addiction & Other Early Recordings ===
Several demos were also recorded during these first years, including unreleased classic The Burning Ashes. The first official release was the New Addiction EP, recorded with producer Mark Stuart and released in 2010 to rave reviews; it is currently available on iTunes, Tesco Online, Napster and Spotify.

Midlands Rocks said,

"The EP is littered with great sleaze and classic rock riffs and huge melodic choruses guaranteed to get audiences singing for weeks on end. ‘The Wire’ is a powerful and unrelenting opener; ‘Hero’ slows the pace down a little but still shifts the air with as much clout as the opener; ‘Crow Road’ is rammed with melody and might; and the beautifully melancholic ‘Day in the Sun’ closes the EP only moments before I find myself reaching for the play button, eager to hear it all again and finding it difficult to find a favourite." - Jason Guest,

The band continued to tour and demo more songs, including further unreleased material What You Do, Watch This and Happy Now. Other songs such as Phobia and Spoken Silence would be included on debut album Reflections but before this release the line-up would change after Matt and Dan decided to resign citing external pressures.

=== Reflections & Fracture ===
In 2011, Matt Nickless and Adam ‘Wolfie’ Howell joined the band. Work continued on new material and the band's sound started to evolve to include a harder edged sound. 2012 saw Liberty Lies opening for Shinedown and Halestorm on tour across the UK and into Europe. This was followed by shows opening for Heaven's Basement and JettBlack, as well as the Hard Rock Hell Ibiza Road Trip.

The Reflections album was released in 2013, preceded by the single Confessions Of An Effigy/Beggars Belief, produced by Matt O'Grady. The single was released on 1 August 2011. Confessions Of An Effigy was recorded at Matt O'Grady's studio in Woking. It was Liberty Lies' first recording with the new line up. The cackblabbath said that with this single the band "definitely found their edge", sounding "mature and confident"; transforming "from their previous blues rock form into something harder and heavier".

Matt Nickless left the band to emigrate just as the album was released and was replaced by Liam "Bill" Billings, who learnt the whole live set in one week prior to the launch show. This show took place at Wolverhampton's Slade Rooms, a venue that the band were now regularly headlining. The band continued to tour and write, with the Fracture EP being released in 2015. This EP contains some of the hardest edged songs that the band has recorded, with the opening track, Undivided, providing the name for the Liberty Lies fanclub; many of which travel all over the UK to enjoy their favourite band.

In 2017, Wolfie decided it was time to move on and was replaced on bass by Miles Bagshaw.

=== It's the Hope That Kills You ===
The band moved forward again throughout 2018 and 2019, releasing several singles that would appear on their next album. Unfortunately, during the summer of 2019, with the album almost complete, Bill decided to part ways with the band for personal reasons. The band made the decision to continue as a four piece.

The launch show for this album took place at Splinter Studios in Wednesbury, with support from Mallen. A support tour for the album was due to take place the following year but the global pandemic put a stop to pretty much all live music for the best part of 18 months.

=== 2021 & Beyond ===
Liberty Lies returned to the stage on 6 August 2021 for the first time since 2019 with a show at The Station in Cannock, supporting Wolf Jaw. A little over a week later, on 15 August they made their debut appearance at Bloodstock Open Air festival on the Sophie Lancaster stage.

There was new music too with the single, Find Me, released just prior to these performances and the single, Monster, following a few months later. The HaLLoween EP was then released in October, containing several cover versions, recorded with guest appearances from members of Wolf Jaw, Sister Shotgun and The Fallen State.

These newer songs see Liberty Lies self-producing and whilst returning to a more classic hard rock sound are probably the catchiest they have ever released.

A tour supporting Skarlett Riot rounds out the year and with festival appearances already scheduled for 2022 and more new music on the way, things definitely seem to be in the ascendency for this band.

== Members ==
Current

- Shaun Richards – vocals (2008–present)
- Adam Stevens – drums (2008–present)
- Josh Pritchett – guitar (2008–present)
- Liam 'Bill' Billings – guitar (2013–2019, 2025–present)
- Miles Bagshaw – bass (2017–present)

Former

- Liam 'Bill' Billings – guitar (2013–2019, 2025–present)
- Adam 'Wolfie' Howell – bass (2011–2017)
- Matt Nickless – guitar (2011–2013)
- Matt Jones – bass (2008–2011)
- Dan Newman – guitar (2008–2011)

Timeline

== Discography ==
=== Albums ===
- Reflections (2013)
- It's the Hope That Kills You (2019)

=== EPs ===
- New Addiction (2010)
- Fracture (2015)
- HaLLoween (2021)

=== Singles ===
- "Confessions of an Effigy" (2011)
- "Someone Else" (2013)
- "Russian Dolls" (2014)
- "Circles" (2015)
- "Vultures" (2015)
- "Are You Listening?" (2016)
- "Mouth Breathers" (2018)
- "Different Tongues" (2018)
- "United Nothing" (2019)
- "A Thousand People" (2019)
- "Letters" (2020)
- "Find Me" (2021)
- "Monster" (2021)
