= Michael Orlando =

Michael Orlando may refer to:

- Michael Orlando, band member of Vampires Everywhere!
- Michael Orlando, acting director of the U.S. National Counterintelligence and Security Center
