= Hellbound and Heartless =

Studio album by Vampires Everywhere!
- Released: June 19, 2012
- Genre: Industrial rock, industrial metal, shock rock, gothic rock
- Label: Century Media
- Producer: Mike Sarkisyan; Tom Decker

Vampires Everywhere! chronology
Kiss the Sun Goodbye (2011)	Hellbound and Heartless (2012)	Ritual (2016)

Hellbound and Heartless is the second studio album from Vampires Everywhere!. The album was released on June 19, 2012 via Century Media and Hollywood Waste Records.

== Reception ==
Hellbound and Heartless has received mixed to negative reviews, with their new direction mostly derided by fans and critics for its similarity to Marilyn Manson, with Decoy Music deeming it "nothing more than a deliberate, cheap, rip-off of what Marilyn Manson did 15 years ago".

== Track listing ==
No.	Title	Length
1.	"I: Hellbound"	1:00
2.	"I Can't Breathe"	3:50
3.	"Beauty Queen"	3:00
4.	"Drug of Choice"	4:01
5.	"II: The Inferno"	0:21
6.	"Star of 666"	3:34
7.	"Kiss of Death"	3:19
8.	"Rape Me" (Nirvana cover)	2:57
9.	"Plastic"	2:51
10.	"III: The 7th Gate"	0:45
11.	"Unholy Eyes"	3:24
12.	"Social Suicide"	3:36
13.	"IV: Born Individual"	0:34
14.	"Anti-Hate"	3:06
15.	"Hell on Earth"	3:34
16.	"Amanda's Song"	4:15
17.	"Generic Disease" (iTunes Bonus Track)	3:16
Total length:		47:18

== Personnel ==
- Michael Vampire - lead vocals
- Aaron Graves - rhythm guitar, bass guitar, drums
- DJ Black - lead guitar, bass guitar
