= Ashestoangels =

English punk band

- Origin: Bristol, England
- Genres: Horror punk, post-hardcore, emo
- Years active: 2009–2021
- Members: Adam Crilly; Adam Falkor; Jarlath McCaughery; Chris Kiddier; Josh Jones; Nikki Kontinen
- Past members: Jim Baber; Nico Venere; Kai Draven; Davey Wilkinson; Leo Farnon
- Website: ashestoangels.co.uk

Ashestoangels were an English horror punk six piece band hailing from Bristol, England. The band is widely recognised as "ringleaders of the U.K. 'new grave' movement," a term coined by Kerrang! Magazine to describe dark alternative rock bands, including New Years Day, DEAD! and Creeper.

The band has received critical acclaim such as a nomination for Best British Newcomer at the 2015 Relentless Kerrang! Awards, voted as a 2015 Best British Newcomer by Rock Sound, and named “One of 12 Bands You Need to Know” for January 2016 by Alternative Press.

== Significant tours and festival appearances ==
=== 2019 ===
- From The Grave To The Stage Tour - co-headline tour with Griever - 10–27 October

=== 2018 ===
- Ashestoangels w/Fail The Enemy & Kill The Silence tour - 18–25 August

=== 2016 ===
- Fort Hope – 22–29 October
- Hawthorne Heights - 9–19 August
- Download Festival – 12 June
- Camden Rocks Festival – 4 June
- Aiden (The Last Sunrise Tour UK) - 16–29 January

=== 2015 ===
- Aiden (The Last Sunrise Tour US Leg) – 26 October – 5 November
- First US Tour dates with Black Veil Brides – 22–23 October – California
- British Horror Story tour – 17–28 July
- Whitby Goth Weekend – 23–26 April
- Takedown Festival – 7 March

=== 2014 ===
The Punishment Tour with William Control - 21–28 April

== Band members ==
- Adam Crilly (aka Crilly Ashes) - Lead vocals, synthesizers, piano
- Adam Falkor - Lead & rhythm guitars, backing vocals
- Josh Jones - Lead, rhythm guitars and harmony guitars, backing vocals - Front man of solo side project “Misery Merchant” (formerly “Coast To Ghost”)
- Chris Kiddier - Bass, gang vocals, synthesizers and creator of the Ashestoangels Filterpress remixes available on Spotify
- Nikki Kontinen - Synthesizers, keyboards, programmed drums, piano, backing vocals - Bass player for the band “Bad Pollyanna”
- Jarlath McCaughery - Drums, gang vocals - formerly of “As Sirens Fall”

== Discography ==
=== Studio albums ===
Title	Album details	Ref.
A Trauma Shared	Released: 13 April 2018; Sound Recording Copyright: Horror Cult Inc.	
How To Bleed	Released: 18 April 2016; Sound Recording Copyright: Horror Cult Inc.	
Horror Cult	Released: 31 October 2014; Sound Recording Copyright: Ashestoangels	
With Tape And Needles	Released: 26 August 2013; Sound Recording Copyright: Dust Devil Sounds	
Most Beautiful Things Are Dead	Released: 12 February 2010; Sound Recording Copyright: Ashestoangels	

=== Extended plays ===
Title	Album details	Ref.
The Midnight Society	Released 13 March 2020; Sound Recording copyright: Ashestoangels	
The Unreliable Narrator	Released: 13 December 2016; Sound Recording Copyright: Ashestoangels	
The Winter Split (with As Sirens Fall)	Released: 9 December 2016; Sound Recording Copyright: As Sirens Fall & Ashestoangels	
The Wake	Released: 20 April 2015; Sound Recording Copyright: Horror Cult Inc.	

== Influences and work with William Control ==
The band cite; Kill Hannah, William Control, and Aiden as shared influences among all members. They recorded albums Horror Cult (2014) and How To Bleed (2016) with Control, the former at Southampton studio The Ranch, for which they flew the producer to the UK with money raised via a fan-supported Indiegogo campaign; and the latter at Control's own Hell's Half Acre studios in Seattle. They would also go on to support Aiden's farewell tours in the US (2015) and UK (2016).

The name "Ashestoangels" is derived from Ashes to Ashes. Vocalist Adam Crilly says that David Bowie was among his earliest musical influences.
