= The Killing Lights (EP) =

EP by The Killing Lights
- Released: December 2, 2014
- Genre: Heavy metal, alternative metal
- Length: 18:39
- Producer: Michael Vampire, DJ Black

The Killing Lights is the first and only EP released by The Killing Lights, a side-project for Vampires Everywhere! when that band was inactive. The EP was supported by a tour in late 2014 and two singles/music videos, "Lies Spread Like Fire" and "Until I Bleed".

== Track listing ==
No.	Title	Length
1.	"Until I Bleed"	4:27
2.	"Barely Breathing"	3:23
3.	"Crashing Down"	3:34
4.	"Lies Spread Like Fire"	3:37
5.	"Conversations"	3:38
Total length:		18:39

== Personnel ==
The Killing Lights

- Michael Vampire - Vocals, engineering, production
- DJ Black - Lead guitar, engineering, production
- Bryan Allan - Bass guitar
- Joshua Ingram - Drums

Additional personnel

- Erik Ron - Mixing, engineering
