= Hate Culture =

Studio album by William Control
- Released: October 28, 2008
- Recorded: June 2008
- Studio: Sleepy Hollow Studio
- Genre: Darkwave; synthpop
- Length: 46:34
- Label: Victory
- Producer: William Control

William Control chronology
Hate Culture (2008)	Noir (2010)

Singles from Hate Culture
- 1. "Beautiful Loser" Released: September 30, 2008

Hate Culture is the debut studio album by William Control. It was released on October 28, 2008, through independent label Victory Records.

== Recording and composition ==
The album was written, produced and engineered by William Control. It was mixed by Justin Armstrong and William Control at Robert Lang Studios in Seattle in July 2008.

The album is a concept album that follows a man named William Control on the last day before he kills himself. Speaking to Kerrang! in 2009, Francis said:

That came out of some serious desperation and hopelessness. Being on the road for five years had worn me down. I’d literally been home for three months in those five years and there were internal problems within Aiden that, coupled with some things that were going in my personal life, meant I snapped and had a breakdown. I went home and wrote some songs that didn’t really fit Aiden. We’re a punk rock band who like horror films…and those were more electronic and dark. I showed them to the label and they liked them so I put together William Control as a solo project and that album came together pretty quickly as a therapeutic outlet.

== Release ==
The single "Beautiful Loser" was released on iTunes on September 30, 2008. On November 4, a music video directed by Kevin McVey was released. In February and March 2009, the band supported Escape the Fate on their headlining tour in the U.S.

== Track listing ==
All tracks are written by William Control, except where noted

No.	Title	Music	Length
1.	"Prologue"		2:03
2.	"Beautiful Loser"		4:35
3.	"Strangers"		4:03
4.	"Hate Culture"		4:23
5.	"Tranquilize"		3:15
6.	"Razor's Edge"		4:20
7.	"We Are Already Here"		0:11
8.	"Cemetery"	William Control and Kenneth Fletcher	3:42
9.	"Don't Cry For Me"		2:56
10.	"Damned"	William Control and Kenneth Fletcher	3:24
11.	"The Whipping Haus"		4:43
12.	"London Town"		4:03
13.	"Untitled" (hidden after track 12)		1:32
Total length:			46:34

Notes

- Prologue is from the opening monologue The Libertine, by Stephen Jeffreys.
- A track from the album sessions, Deathclub, was remixed by Wes Borland and Renholdër and included on the Underworld: Rise of the Lycans: Original Motion Picture Soundtrack.

== Personnel ==
All credits adapted from liner notes.

- Justin Armstrong – mixing
- Brit Asema – additional backing vocals (track: 11)
- Juliana Bricknell – voice (track: 7)
- William Control – producer, engineer, mixing
- DoubleJ – artwork, layout
- Kenneth Fletcher – assistant engineer
- Jake Gravbot – styling
- Lisa Johnson – photography
- Shannie Xavier Yngvason – additional backing vocals (tracks: 5 & 6)
