= Babylon (William Control album) =

Video by William Control
- Released: August 15, 2014
- Recorded: April 26, 2014
- Genre: Darkwave, synthpop, goth
- Length: 68:46
- Label: Control Records
- Director: Tim Bullock
- Producer: A Glass Half

William Control chronology
The Neuromancer (2014)	Babylon (2014)	Remix (2014)

Babylon is the second live DVD by William Control. It was filmed at Bar Sinister in Hollywood on April 26, 2014 on a night off from Combichrist's We Love Tour, and released on August 14, 2014 through Control Records as a limited run of 500 DVDs and 100 USB flash drives. Pre-orders began on June 27 through Control's Control Merch website. The audio soundtrack is available as a download through iTunes and Amazon. Tracks from the newly released The Neuromancer naturally featured heavily, and there were guest appearances from Andy Biersack of Black Veil Brides and Ash Costello of New Years Day. Onstage performance art came from Isabella Garcia, Andrea Draven and Dorian Dane.

== Track listing ==
All tracks are written by William Control and Kenneth Fletcher.

No.	Title	Length
1.	"Intro"	0:39
2.	"New World Order"	4:28
3.	"All Due Restraint"	3:03
4.	"Price We Pay"	4:06
5.	"Illuminator" (featuring Andy Biersack)	4:07
6.	"Beautiful Loser"	3:55
7.	"Strangers"	4:17
8.	"Dorian Gray" (featuring Ash Costello)	2:05
9.	"Tranquilize" (featuring Ash Costello)	1:39
10.	"Adore (Fall in Love Forever)"	4:54
11.	"Revelator"	5:02
12.	"The Blade"	5:02
13.	"My Lady Dominate"	3:37
14.	"Kiss Me Judas"	4:26
15.	"Where the Angels Burn"	8:50
16.	"Razor's Edge"	4:17
17.	"I'm Only Human Sometimes"	4:19
Total length:		68:46

== Personnel ==
- William Control: vocals
- Kenneth Fletcher: bass
- Ian MacWilliams: keyboards
- Sound: Bob Bicknell
- Director: Tim Bullock
- Cinematography: Mike McMillin and Tim Bullock
- Film editing: A Glass Half
- Cover photos by: Anabel DFlux
- Live photos by: Lisa Johnson
