= Kiss the Sun Goodbye =

Studio album by Vampires Everywhere!
- Released: May 17, 2011
- Recorded: 2010–2011
- Genre: Post-hardcore, horror punk, gothic rock, metalcore, electronicore
- Length: 42:55
- Label: Century Media
- Producer: Fred Archambault

Vampires Everywhere! chronology
Lost in the Shadows (2010)	Kiss the Sun Goodbye (2011)	Hellbound and Heartless (2012)

Alternate cover
- F.y.e. Edition Cover

Kiss the Sun Goodbye is the first full-length studio album from Vampires Everywhere!. The album was released on May 17, 2011 via Century Media and Hollywood Waste Records. It is the last album to feature David Darko, Jay Killa, and Alexander Rogue.

== Reception ==
The album received mostly mixed reviews. The album ranked on Place 19th at the Billboard Top Hard Rock Albums and on Place 43 on Top Independent Albums (Billboard).

== Track listing ==
Standard edition
No.	Title	Length
1.	"Bury Me Alive"	3:53
2.	"Immortal Love"	4:16
3.	"Undead Heart"	3:18
4.	"Ashes to Ashes"	3:40
5.	"Kill the Chemicals"	3:40
6.	"Bleeding Rain (feat. Wil Francis of Aiden)"	3:17
7.	"Carnage at the Castle"	3:19
8.	"The Embrace"	3:50
9.	"Lipstick Lies"	2:58
10.	"Children of the Night"	3:46
11.	"Call Out the Dead"	3:37
12.	"Silver Bullets Don't Kill Vampires"	3:21

iTunes Edition
No.	Title	Length
13.	"Teenage Dream (Katy Perry cover)"	4:32
14.	"Dear Eliza (Demo)"	4:16

Hot Topic Edition
No.	Title	Length
13.	"Let Me In"	3:48
14.	"Forever, Forever"	3:35
15.	"Dear Eliza"	4:14
16.	"Immortal Love (Remix)"	5:18

F.y.e. Edition
No.	Title	Length
13.	"Heart for the Heartless"	3:41
14.	"Bury Me Alive (Demo)"	4:15
15.	"Dear Eliza"	4:14

== Personnel ==
- Michael Vampire - lead vocals
- Zak Night - lead guitar
- Aaron Graves - rhythm guitar
- Alexander Rogue - bass guitar
- Jay Killa - keyboards
- David Darko - drums
- Wil Francis - guest vocals on "Bleeding Rain"
