= Funding Tree =

British crowdfunding platform

- Type: Crowdfunding
- Founded: 2013
- Headquarters: London, UK
- Key people: Dillen Iyavoo; (CEO); Meb Ali; (co-founder); George Anastasi; (Chief Business Development Officer)
- Website: www.fundingtree.co.uk

Funding Tree is an FCA regulated online crowdfunding platform headquartered in London, UK. The website officially launched in August 2014, becoming the world’s first fully regulated loan and equity-based crowdfunding and peer-to-peer business lending platform.

== History ==
Funding Tree was founded in January 2013 by three South London entrepreneurs George Anastasi, Meb Ali and Dillen Iyavoo.

Funding Tree is part of the alternative finance industry which is helping to supply SMEs with the monetary means to begin or develop business without the need for a bank.

== See also ==
- Funding Circle
