= Noir (William Control album) =

Studio album by William Control
- Released: June 8, 2010
- Recorded: at Sleepy Hollow Studios
- Genre: Darkwave, Synthpop
- Length: 45:13
- Label: Victory
- Producer: William Control

William Control chronology
Hate Culture (2008)	Noir (2010)	Novus Ordo Seclorum (2011)

Singles from Noir
- 1. "I'm Only Human Sometimes" Released: June 1, 2010

Noir is the second studio album by William Control. It was released on June 8, 2010, and the only single, released a day after the album, was I'm Only Human Sometimes (which live performances have been ended with for some years now). This was accompanied by a music video, with both clean and uncensored versions available. The single's cover was rejected by online music retailer iTunes, who considered it 'unsuitable for minors'. Noir was written, produced and engineered by William Control, and recorded at Sleepy Hollow Studios, then mixed by Justin Armstrong and William Control at Robert Lang Studios in Seattle.

== Track listing ==
All tracks are written by William Control, except where noted.

No.	Title	Music	Length
1.	"Une Annonce"		1:24
2.	"Vorspiel"	Kenneth Fletcher	1:06
3.	"All Due Restraint"		3:09
4.	"I'm Only Human Sometimes"		3:30
5.	"Can't Help Falling In Love"	George Weiss, Hugo Peretti, Luigi Creatore	3:22
6.	"Why Dance With The Devil, When You Have Me?" (featuring Kurupt and Liza Graves)		4:10
7.	"My Lady Dominate"		4:02
8.	"Soliloquy"		3:56
9.	"Dorian Gray" (featuring Ashley Costello and Jeffree Star, bridge quotes from The Picture of Dorian Gray by Oscar Wilde)		3:47
10.	"Ultrasound"		2:53
11.	"Noir"	William Control, Luke Ryan Barnes	2:32
12.	"Epilogue" (dialogue from The Libertine by Stephen Jeffreys; hidden track starts at 8:35)		11:22
Total length:			45:13

== Trivia ==
- The title of track 1 is French for 'an announcement' while the title of track 2 is German for 'prelude'.
- Track 4 contains references to the novel and film Let The Right One In.
- Track 9 is about The Picture of Dorian Gray and is told from the perspective of its lead character.
- Track 5 is a cover of Can't Help Falling In Love by Elvis Presley.
- Album pre-order packages contained a pair of unisex briefs branded with the William Control logo.
- Scylla and Charybdis are monsters from Greek mythology, representing having to choose between 2 equally dangerous situations.

== Credits ==
- Photography: Lisa Johnson
- Art direction: DoubleJ
- Assistant engineers: Bob Bicknell, John Troxell, Jason Weiner and Brian San Marco
