= Fearless Vampire Killers (band) =

English alternative rock band

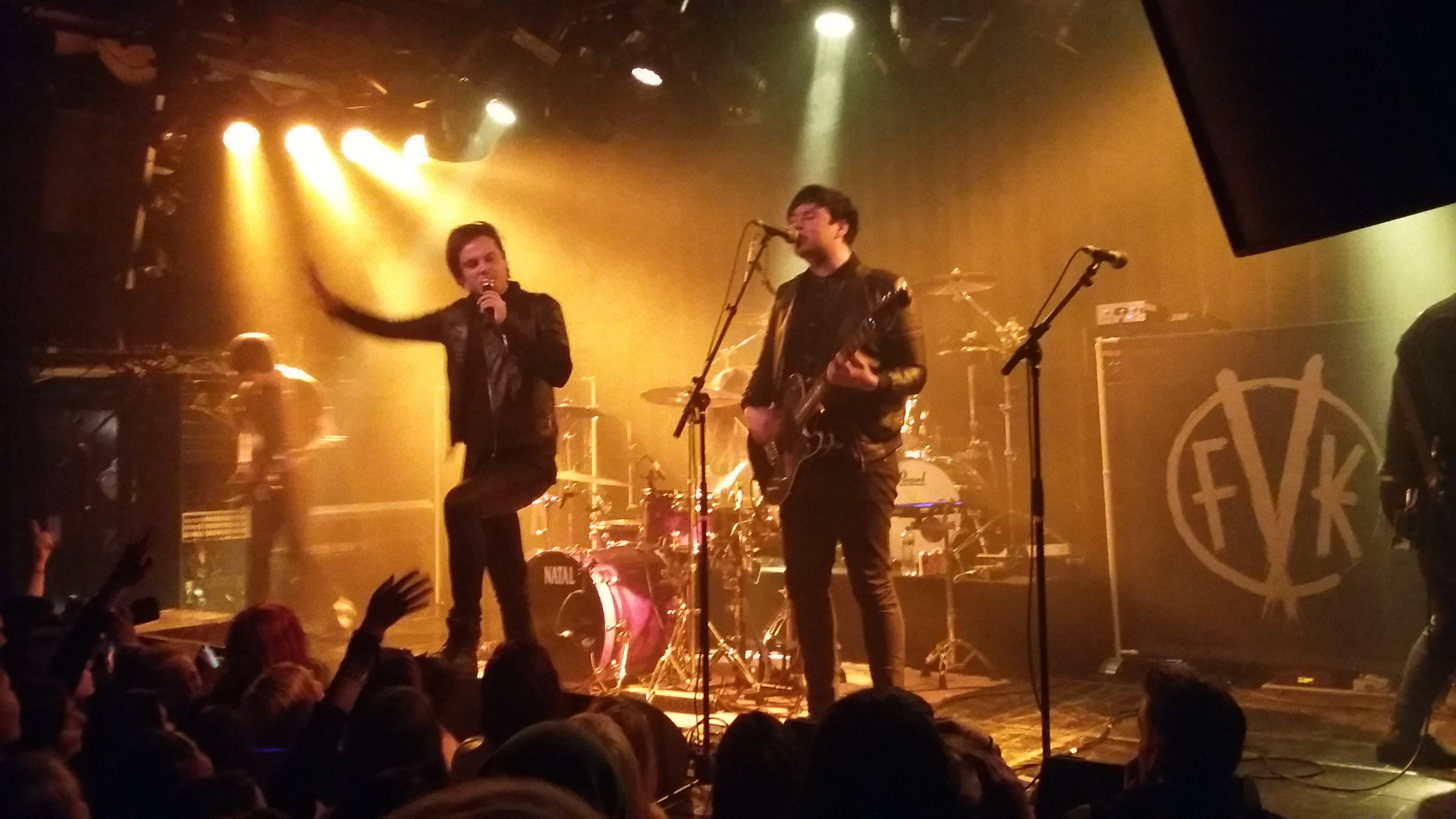
- FVK live at the Melkweg in Amsterdam, Netherlands (February 12, 2016)

Background information
- Origin: Beccles, England
- Genres: Rock; alternative rock; pop punk; post-hardcore; horror punk; emo
- Years active: 2008–2016, 2021, 2022–present
- Labels: Goremount, PIAS Recordings
- Members: Kier Kemp; Laurence Beveridge; Drew Woolnough; Shane Sumner; Luke Illingworth
- Past members: Nick Hill; Chester Elven; Luke Fairhead
- Website: www.fearlessvampirekillers.co.uk

Fearless Vampire Killers (FVK) are a five-piece English theatrical alternative rock band formed in Beccles in 2008. Their line-up consists of vocalist and rhythm guitarist Laurence Beveridge, vocalist and rhythm guitarist Kier Kemp, bassist Drew Woolnough, lead guitarist Cyrus Barrone (Shane Sumner) and drummer Luke Illingworth (Pilnahn). The name of the band originated from the 1967 Roman Polanski comedy horror film The Fearless Vampire Killers.

Their debut studio album Militia of the Lost was set for release on 7 May 2012 through Goremount Records, but the physical release was pushed back to 14 May 2012. The digital release went ahead as planned. A deluxe version of the CD, containing more exclusive artwork, was released at the same time. In 2014, they were an opening act for Black Veil Brides' tour. They released a mini-album, Bruises in 2015.

The band announced their breakup on July 4, 2016, in a Facebook post, due to Kier Kemp's decision to leave. The band briefly reunited for a one off performance in memory of their tour manager Stevie D on May 7, 2021. The band returned on March 11, 2022, after a previously teased secret show under a false band name, then releasing their new songs Delicate and Something Terminal on April 1, 2022.

== Biography ==
The band's first incarnation was under the name of Remember When back in 2007, consisting of Laurence Beveridge, Kier Kemp and Shane Sumner as well as their previous drummer Luke Fairhead. All of the members of Remember When knew each other from growing up in Waveney Valley in Suffolk. Soon after moving to London, Remember When broke up and its former members then came together as FVK in 2008. A short time later, they recruited Drew Woolnough, who had previously played with Laurence in a band called Self-Titled, to play bass. After going through a series of drummers, the current line-up was completed in 2011 when Luke Illingworth joined as their final drummer before the split.

The band were known for being very hands-on with their work, with Shane Sumner producing all of their artwork and merchandise designs. Additionally, Laurence Beveridge wrote a 334-page novel called Ruple & Evelyn to go along with their EP, In Grandomina..., although the events in the story happen roughly 600 years before the events in the songs.

Parts of their look, especially Shane Sumner's stage outfit, were influenced by steampunk as well as "turn-of-the-century France, late-1800s bohemian ideas, short waistcoats [and] a bit of the old eyeliner" according to past vocalist Kier Kemp.

Their debut album, Militia of the Lost, was described as a concept record by vocalist Laurence Beveridge; it features themes of "love, loss and addiction" as well as being "an album about the struggle to find a place in society." The songs in the album are about "the events in the lead up to, and subsequently the repercussions, of the city’s royal palace being set on fire" and "five men [that] cross paths and get dragged into this world of monsters and crazed revolutionaries." They recorded their second album in the summer of 2013 with William Control as the producer.

The band announced their breakup on July 4, 2016, via a Facebook post, due to Kier deciding to leave. The stated in the post that they had "come to the conclusion that it would be wrong to continue this band without Kier by our side."

They have stated that they will continue to create music (although "the specifics are uncertain") and The Obsidian Bond will remain active as a place to maintain the community that it had created. After several years of inactivity, a post was made on January 7, 2022, on The Obsidian Bond Facebook, hinting at further activity from the band.

In early 2022, fans noticed similarities to FVK's musician and promotional style in an act called After the Flames, who released two songs on Soundcloud and teased a show at The Black Hearts in Camden, London on March 11, 2022. Support acts for the group were also friends with FVK members. On March 11, 2022, the After the Flames show was revealed to be a secret Fearless Vampire Killers reunion show, signifying their comeback.

== Musical style and influences ==
They cite influences such as David Bowie, Queen, Green Day, Weezer, Danny Elfman, Iron Maiden, Avenged Sevenfold, Metallica and The Kinks.

A review by Rock Sound of their first EP, In Grandomina, described the tracks as "gothically inclined pop-rock songs" that "boast some decent hooks, with a new romantic sensibility spliced into the mix in a weirdly effective fashion." Reaction to their second EP, ... The Blood Never Dries, was mixed, with most reviewers offering a score of 3/5 or similar. They have been suggested as for fans of American rock bands My Chemical Romance, Black Veil Brides, Aiden and English rock band Muse and Bizarre Magazine had said "if My Chemical Romance and Panic! at the Disco mated, their offspring might look like Fearless Vampire Killers" and that they were an "incredibly promising prospect." The former band had also described their sounds in various interviews as Danny Elfman Diarrhoea and Halloween in a roast dinner.

=== Press ===
They were named as one of Kerrang!'s '10 Best Unsigned Bands in Britain' in September 2011. They were also featured as Guardian Newspaper's Band of the Day (#1226) and Rocksound.tv selected them as their Band of the Week on 5 March 2012. Altsounds featured them before the release of the album with an "In Pictures" taken at their acoustic gig at St Luke's Church.

They have appeared in print in many publications, such as Big Cheese, Rock Sound (calling them "an instant antidote to everything predictable and mundane"), Artrocker and Kerrang!. In early 2012, they were featured in Kerrang!'s Shots of 2011 - The New Breed, which contained photos of new and upcoming bands, and their release show for their EP '... The Blood Never Dries' was rated four Ks out of five by Kerrang!, who did a full-page spread on it: in the review, they labelled them as "potential stars of the future." Kerrang! also later called them "the new band of [their] dreams" in an introducing page.

They received their first major award nomination in May 2012 when they were nominated for "Best British Newcomer" at the 2012 Kerrang! Awards. Kier Kemp, co-frontman for the band, was chosen by Kerrang! for #20 in their list of the '50 Greatest Rockstars in the World Today'.

Then ex-guitarist and vocalist Kier Kemp appeared on Channel Four news in a brief segment on 4 April 2013 about attacks against members of "alternative sub-cultures" being classed as hate crimes.

The band were again nominated for "Best British Newcomer" in May 2013 for the 2013 Kerrang! Awards.

=== Tours and appearances ===
FVK have played regularly in small venues all around England. In December 2010, they supported rock band Aiden on several of their UK tour dates. They also played at Rebellion Festival, the world's biggest punk festival, in August 2011 and at O2 Academy Islington in October 2011. In June 2011, they embarked on a Scottish tour, Rockstar Energy Drink's The Harder They Fall Tour, for the very first time with Hopeless Heroic, Drive By Audio, Stanley Odd and Excellent Cadaver.

In April 2012, they were announced as a support act for William Control, lead singer of Aiden Wil Francis' side-project, on the UK leg of his UK/Euro 2012 tour The New Faith. They were announced on the lineup of Download Festival 2012, a three-day English rock music festival held annually at Donington Park and played on two days.

They embarked on a UK co-headline tour with fellow Kerrang! Award's Best British Newcomer nominated band The Dead Lay Waiting in October 2012, called "The Killing Is Dead Tour". The two bands headlined the Exeter Zombie Walk and Ball. The tour climaxed with them supporting Wednesday 13 on Halloween in London.

They were a support act for Black Veil Brides on the 11-date Kerrang! Tour 2013. The other support bands on the tour were Tonight Alive and Chiodos. In April 2013, the band toured around England (with one date in Glasgow) with Fort Hope, on the "Diamonds and Disgrace" tour. They went on to headline the Red Bull stage at Download Festival 2013 after an appearance there in 2012. They are also a support act on Madina Lake's September farewell tour of the UK.

In August, it was announced they were set to join William Control on the North American "Revel Without A Cause Tour" in 2013.

The band announced in March that they would be touring parts of the UK with Dead! and other artists as part of the "Cabin Fever Tour", starting 13 April 2014.

On 31 May 2014 FVK appeared at Camden Rocks Festival, playing both an acoustic and electric set.

The band were a support act to Black Veil Brides on the UK leg of their "Black Mass" tour in October 2014, along with Attila and Drama Club. They were a support band for Black Veil Brides on the EU leg of their "Black Mass" tour in March 2015, along with Like A Storm. They also supported In This Moment on their tour of Europe and the UK in February and March 2015. Their headlining "Unbreakable Hearts" UK tour has been rescheduled for 2015.

Through 2014-2016, FVK have continued to immerse themselves in touring; after having their first ever taste of Europe with Black Veil Brides on the "Black Mass" tour in 2014, they have continued to return with other bands, constantly expanding their fanbase and travelling further out. In December 2014, it was announced that FVK would be supporting In This Moment on their 'Black Widow' tour in February 2015. Their most recent European tours have been with Annisokay in October 2015 and their most recent: Supporting Escape The Fate on their 'Hate Me' tour in January 2016.

The band announced their first headline European tour which took place in May 2016.

FVK later announced that they would once again be taking part in Escape The Fate's UK tour which is due to take place in June 2016. The band also announced that they would have been playing Leeds and Reading Festival for the first time in August 2016, followed by Butserfest in September 2016, however they have been pulled from the lineup due to their split. They would have been playing The Pit stage at the event.

=== The Obsidian Bond ===
On 17 July 2014, FVK launched their very own social networking website called "The Obsidian Bond"

It was fan-orientated social network, consisting of many features such as guitar and drum tabular and lyrics to all of their songs. It also contained exclusive band footage such as their documentary, At War With The Thirst, new and old podcasts, acoustic versions of their songs and exclusive videos recorded by the band themselves.

The original purpose of the website was for the fans of FVK to come together and socialize. Members could add each other to build their friends list as well as post messages, photos and videos on each other's walls. The Obsidian Bond also contained a large number of groups and forums where fans could post artwork, cosplay photos and photography as well as having the opportunity to create their own groups and forums and discuss whatever they wish.

The Obsidian Bond was also a base for fans to read stories written by Laurence Beveridge. There was a large selection of his writing stored in the site's library.

It was used to stream FVK's latest album, Unbreakable Hearts, before its release. Upon the website's launch, a track was previewed every week. Once a track had been online for a week, it was taken down the following Thursday and replaced with the next track on the album. As the weeks went by, the fans were also given a story to go along with the track. The story explained the backstory of the song as well as expanded on the album's concept.

== Discography ==
=== Albums ===
- Bruises (2015)

No.	Title	Writer(s)	Length
1.	"Feel Alive"	Kier Kemp	3:39
2.	"Stepping Stones"	Laurence Beveridge	3:01
3.	"Keep Smiling"	Drew Woolnough	4:24
4.	"Regret"	Drew Woolnough	4:44
5.	"Like Bruises"	Laurence Beveridge	3:54
6.	"Aging Love"	Laurence Beveridge	4:16

- Unbreakable Hearts (2014)

No.	Title	Writer(s)	Length
1.	"Intermission"	FVK	0:56
2.	"Say What You Want from Me (The Ghost You Left Behind)"	FVK	4:31
3.	"Turn Your Heaven to a Tomb"	Laurence Beveridge	3:41
4.	"Exploding Heart Disorder"	FVK	3:34
5.	"Edge of Eternity"	FVK	3:07
6.	"Taste the Iron on Your Lips"	FVK	3:21
7.	"Our Nature's Unnatural"	FVK	3:45
8.	"Dream of You"	FVK	4:42
9.	"Brave the Night"	Kier Kemp & Luke Illingworth	5:16
10.	"In Wondrous Rage"	FVK	3:33
11.	"Neon in the Dancehalls"	Laurence Beveridge	3:52
12.	"Batten Down the Hatches"	FVK	3:47
13.	"Maeby"	FVK	4:07
14.	"Unbreakable Hearts"	FVK	5:03
15.	"Remember My Name"	FVK	5:04
16.	"Lucifer's Shroud"	FVK	2:37
17.	"City Falls to Dust"	FVK	6:16

- Militia of the Lost (2012)

No.	Title	Writer(s)	Length
1.	"Necromania"	Drew Woolnough	3:16
2.	"Could We Burn, Darling?"	Laurence Beveridge	2:36
3.	"Concede, Repent, Destroy"	Drew Woolnough	3:47
4.	"Bleed 'Till Sunrise"	Laurence Beveridge	3:02
5.	"Bite Down On My Winchester (There's a Reckoning A'Coming)"	Drew Woolnough	2:52
6.	"Palace in Flames"	Laurence Beveridge	2:20
7.	"Even Ghosts Forget (The Empire for a Kiss)"	Laurence Beveridge	2:07
8.	"Fetish for the Finite"	Laurence Beveridge	3:08
9.	"Bow Ties on Dead Guys"	Drew Woolnough	2:11
10.	"Pleasure of the Pain"	Laurence Beveridge	2:42
11.	"At War with the Thirst"	Laurence Beveridge	4:38
12.	"Mascara Tears and Vanilla Spice"	Laurence Beveridge	3:27

=== EPs ===
- In Grandomina... (2010)

No.	Title	Writer(s)	Length
1.	"Faces In The Dirt"	FVK	3:02
2.	"Palace In Flames"	Laurence Beveridge	3:24
3.	"Interlude (Feat. Crystal Bats)"		0:47
4.	"Don Teriesto"	Shane Sumner	4:27
5.	"Fearless Vampire Killers"	FVK	3:44

- ... The Blood Never Dries (2011)

No.	Title	Writer(s)	Length
1.	"..."		0:18
2.	"A Study In Dystopia"	Drew Woolnough	2:52
3.	"Bleed Till Sunrise"	Laurence Beveridge	3:06
4.	"Concede, Repent, Destroy"	Drew Woolnough	4:03
5.	"Fetish For The Finite"	Laurence Beveridge	3:13

- Exposition: The Five Before The Flames (2013)

No.	Title	Writer(s)	Length
1.	"The Pilot: P-Train"	Luke Illingworth	5:08
2.	"The Thief: Merchants Of Decay"	Kier Kemp	3:44
3.	"The Mechanist: Handlung (Stargazer)"	Shane Sumner	4:16
4.	"The Vigilante: Death Or Disgrace"	Drew Woolnough	4:56
5.	"The Prince: Diamond Dust And Crimson Reign"	Laurence Beveridge	3:33

=== Singles ===
Date of release	Title	Producer	Label
30 November 2009	"I Am Gonna Leave You"	Paul Tipler	Self Released
26 March 2012	"Bow Ties on Dead Guys"	Ben Humphreys, James Billinge and John Mitchell	Goremount Records
11 June 2012	"Could We Burn, Darling?"	Ben Humphreys, James Billinge and John Mitchell	Goremount Records
5 November 2012	"Exploding Heart Disorder" / "Palace in Flames"	Ben Humphreys, James Billinge and John Mitchell	Goremount Records
25 January 2013	"Diamond Dust and Crimson Reign"	Ben Humphreys, James Billinge and John Mitchell	Goremount Records
28 September 2013	"All Hallows Evil"	Ben Humphreys, James Billinge and John Mitchell	Goremount Records

=== Compilation albums ===
Date of release	Compilation	Producer	Track
June 2010	Big Cheese Mix Tape	Josh Friend	"Palace in Flames"
March 2012	Rock Sound 100% Volume: 159	—	"Fetish for the Finite"
April 2013	Rock Sound 100% Volume: 172	—	"Diamond Dust and Crimson Reign"
