= The Neuromancer =

Studio album by William Control
- Released: April 4, 2014
- Recorded: Hell's Half Acre
- Genre: Dark wave; synth-pop
- Label: Control Records
- Producer: William Control

William Control chronology
Skeleton Strings (2013)	''The Neuromancer'' (2014)	Babylon (2014)

Singles from The Neuromancer
- 1. "Revelator" Released: April 2, 2014; 2. "Price We Pay" Released: May 18, 2014

The Neuromancer is the fourth studio album by William Control. Preceded by a lyric video for Illuminator, the album was released on April 4, 2014, through Control Records, and was produced and engineered by William Control. It was recorded at Control's own Hell's Half Acre studio in September/October 2013, mixed by Ryan O John, and mastered by Alan Douches at West West Side. All lyrics are by William Francis. The single Revelator was also released in April, and accompanied by a video. This was followed in May by a second single, Price We Pay. The album had been scheduled for release in late 2013, but was delayed in order to make it 'the best it could possibly be'.

== Track listing ==
All tracks are written by William Control and Kenneth Fletcher.

No.	Title	Length
1.	"Introduction"	1:13
2.	"Adore (Fall In Love Forever)"	4:54
3.	"Revelator"	5:00
4.	"Price We Pay"	4:46
5.	"God Is Dead"	3:40
6.	"The Filth And The Fetish" (features vocals by Ashley Jade)	5:37
7.	"Illuminator" (features vocals by Andy Biersack of Black Veil Brides)	4:13
8.	"Passengers"	3:13
9.	"The Blade"	2:56
10.	"Love Is A Shadow"	4:09
11.	"Where The Angels Burn"	6:54
Total length:		49:00

== Trivia ==
- B-sides included London Town (Alternative Version) and The Promise (When In Rome cover)
- The spoken word part of Illuminator takes inspiration from Anais Nin's preface to Henry Miller's novel Tropic Of Cancer.

== Credits ==
Photography and artwork: Kenneth Fletcher
