= The Red (EP) =

Revelations: The Red EP

EP by William Control
- Released: July 14, 2017
- Studio: Hell's Half Acre
- Genre: Darkwave; new wave; synthpop
- Length: 13:50
- Label: Control
- Producer: Kenneth Fletcher

William Control chronology
Revelations: The Black EP (2017)	Revelations: The Red EP (2017)	Revelations: The White EP (2017)

Singles from Revelations: The Red EP
- 1. "Let Her Go" Released: September 6, 2017

Professional ratings
Review scores
Source	Rating
Electrozombies	4.25/5 stars

Revelations: The Red EP is the third in a series of four EPs that make up Revelations, the fifth studio album by William Control. The other three EPs are The Pale, The Black and The White, after the Four Horsemen of the Apocalypse. It was released by Control Records on July 14, 2017, and peaked at 179 on the Billboard 200 chart, at number 5 on the Billboard Dance/Electronic Albums chart, and at number one on the Heatseekerschart. A video for Let Her Go was released on September 6, 2017.

The EP was recorded at Control's Hell's Half Acre studio and was produced and engineered by Kenneth Fletcher, and engineered and mixed by Axel Otero of the band Lay Your Ghost. It was mastered by John Troxell. Fans were invited down to the Control Merch shop to record gang vocals.

== Track listing ==
No.	Title	Length
1.	"Kiss The Girl"	3:06
2.	"Let Her Go"	3:38
3.	"Scars"	2:55
4.	"Submit"	4:11
Total length:		13:50

== Personnel ==
All credits adapted from liner notes.

- Kenneth Fletcher – producer, engineer, artwork, layout
- Axel Otero – engineer, mixing
- John Troxell – mastering

== Charts ==
Chart (2017)	Peak position
US Billboard 200 (Billboard)	179
US Dance/Electronic Albums (Billboard)	5
US Heatseekers Albums (Billboard)	1
US Independent Albums (Billboard)	5
US Rock Albums (Billboard)	26
