= Vampires Everywhere! =

American rock band

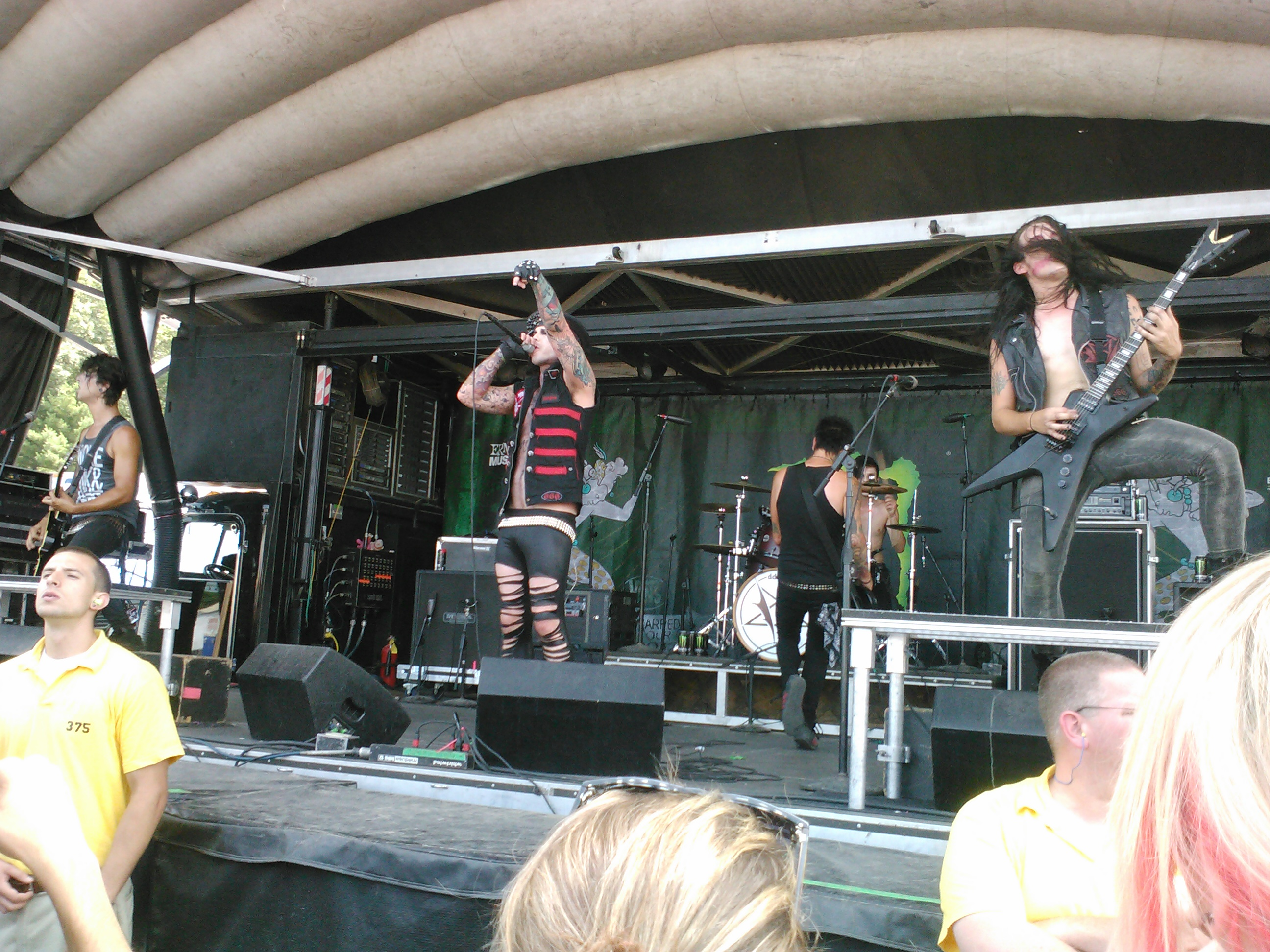
- Vampires Everywhere! performing on the Warped Tour in 2012

Background information
- Also known as: The Killing Lights (2013–2015)
- Origin: Los Angeles, California, U.S.
- Genres: Gothic metal; gothic rock; metalcore; post-hardcore; heavy metal; industrial rock; shock rock
- Years active: 2009–2013; 2015–2016; 2021–present
- Labels: Century Media, Hollywood Waste, Cleopatra
- Members: Michael Vampire; Jesse James Smith; Michael "Ghost" Rodd; Brandon Blackout Burke
- Past members: Matti Hoffman; Grey Soto; David Hernandez; Alexander Hernandez; Zak Dunn; Jessica Leigh; Philip Anthony; Aaron Martin; Adam Vex; Miles Roger; Frankie Sil; Chris Paterson; Bryan Allan; DJ Blackard; Joshua Ingram; Tyler Strattin; Craig "Nello" Pirtle; Chris Fulp
- Website: Vampires Everywhere! on Facebook

Vampires Everywhere! (known as The Killing Lights between 2013 and 2015) is an American metalcore band from Los Angeles, California, currently based in Las Vegas, Nevada. The last lineup consisted of vocalist Michael Vampire and guitarists Matti Hoffman and Grey Soto. In 2021, the lead singer Michael Vampire reformed the group, and the band signed with Cleopatra Records, releasing "Witch", a single from their second EP, The Awakening, released in October 2021.

== History ==
=== Formation and Lost in the Shadows (2009–2010) ===
Vampires Everywhere! was founded in 2009 by Michael Orlando (a.k.a. Michael Vampire). The band's name came from the movie The Lost Boys. "Vampires Everywhere!" is a comic book in the movie that explains the rules of vampires and how to kill them.

On February 9, 2010, Vampires Everywhere! released their debut EP Lost in the Shadows. The first single and music video, "Immortal Love", was released exclusively on PureVolume on January 18, 2010. Together with director Scott Hanson, who worked with A Day to Remember, Carnifex, A Skylit Drive and Alesana, Vampires Everywhere! produced a music video for their song Immortal Love which was shown at MTV 2 (Headbangers Ball), Heavy Rotation and Fuse On-Demand.

The group toured through the US and Canada with acts including Escape The Fate Brokencyde, Black Veil Brides, Eyes Set to Kill, Get Scared, Dr. Acula, Aiden, Alesana, Honor Bright, Our Last Night, Polkadot Cadaver and Modern Day Escape. They shared stage with X Japan and Murderdolls as the opener. They played a gig at SXSW 2010 with D.R.U.G.S., VersaEmerge and Black Veil Brides in Austin, Texas.

Their single "Undead Heart" was released on November 29, 2010.

=== Kiss the Sun Goodbye (2011) ===
The debut album Kiss the Sun Goodbye followed on May 17, 2011, and was released worldwide via Hollywood Waste Records. Wil Francis (Aiden, William Control) was guest singer in the song "Bleeding Rain". The Deluxe Version includes 3 Bonus tracks. Their second music video was directed by Fred Archambault who worked with Avenged Sevenfold and Deftones. The album ranked on Place 19th at the Billboard Top Hard Rock Albums and on Place 43 on Top Independent Albums (Billboard).

Since then Alex Rouge and David Darko have left the band to form their own band called The Automatic Me.

In August 2011, Vampires Everywhere! played at Sunset Strip Music Festival. The band covered Katy Perry's song Teenage Dream.

In Fall 2011, they played on the "Something Wicked This Way Comes Tour" with Wednesday 13, Polkadot Cadaver & Nightmare Sonata.

In December 2011, they announced that they would be releasing a new album sometime in 2012.

=== Hellbound and Heartless and disbandment (2012–2013) ===
On April 25, 2012, bassist Philip Kross left the band, amicably, to pursue other projects. The next day, Vampires Everywhere! announced that Adam Vex would be replacing him temporarily while on tour.

Their second album, Hellbound and Heartless, was released on June 19, 2012, presenting a drastic change in style from metalcore and gothic rock to industrial metal, featuring influences from shock rock and industrial metal acts such as Ministry and Marilyn Manson. The band played the entire Summer Vans Warped Tour to support the album.

In October 2012, the band embarked the road with Alesana, In Fear and Faith, and Glamour of the Kill, then joined Orgy and Davey Suicide on the "Wide Awake and Dead" Tour throughout March 2013.

In November 2013, Michael released a statement, announcing that Vampires Everywhere! had been disbanded, and that the members would instead release new music as The Killing Lights. They released a new song, "Don't Turn Around", a few days later.

=== The Killing Lights (2014) ===
On August 14, The Killing Lights released a video, directed by Will Da Rosa, for "Lies Spread Like Fire", a new song from their upcoming EP. The Killing Lights later performed their first headlining show at Chain Reaction on October 4, where they played their EP in its entirety.

On October 21, The Killing Lights released a second single, "Until I Bleed", through Kerrang! around the same time pre-orders for their EP, The Killing Lights, went live, the EP was released on December 2, 2014.

A music video, directed by Brad Golowin, for "Until I Bleed" was planned for a November release, but was instead released on December 11, a tour in support of the EP was planned for 2015.

=== Reformation, Ritual, and second breakup (2015–2016) ===
On February 11, 2015, The Killing Lights reverted to Vampires Everywhere! and, shortly after, announced that they were recording a new album in two sessions, the first to commence in March, the second in April, in Salt Lake City.

Michael Vampire later performed with Motionless In White at Rock on the Range.

On November 30, the band played on the Bat2Bat Tour with Consider Me Dead and Set to Stun. Immediately after the tour ended, they released the song "Black Betty", off the new album, Ritual, which had a tentative release date of early 2016.

On January 19, 2016, they released the first official single from the new album, a cover of "Take Me to Church", featuring Alex Koehler of Chelsea Grin. Ritual was finally released on March 18, 2016, and was supported by a short headlining tour, before they joined Filter, Orgy, and Death Valley High on their Make America Hate Again Tour.

November 2016, Vampires Everywhere! disbanded once again and Michael Vampire started a new band called Dead Girls Academy.

=== Second comeback ===
In March 2021, Michael Vampire announced that Vampires Everywhere will have a second comeback and playing the first concert at Summit Music Fest. In July the same year, the band released their comeback single "Witch," announced the release of their forthcoming EP The Awakening, and the signing with Cleopatra Records as well as an US tour throughout October with Assuming We Survive and The Bunny the Bear.

On December 13, Michael Vampire announced the "From Hell With Love" Tour, with support from Young Medicine, City Of The Weak and Junexa. The tour cover was a tease for a new song, which was called "Sudden Death", including a music video.39 The Single released on January 14, 2022. The music video reached over 400.000 views after only 3 weeks after its release, stand by February 2, 2022.41

On March 31, 2022, Michael Vampire announced "The Scene Is Alive" Tour. This was the first time Vampires Everywhere! has toured in the United Kingdom in the band's history. The cover showcased Michael Vampire while his hair covered his face while looking to the side, while covering himself with his hoodie. The same exact cover was used for the new Single "Tear Me Down" which released on May 6, including a music video.40

On October 1, Michael Vampire announced a remake of the song "Immortal Love" called "Immortal Love: Resurrection".42 The Song, including a music video was released on October 14. The remake of the song vastly differed from the original, with less scream vocals and clean verse vocals, a guitar solo and a breakdown at the end. .

On October 31, Michael Vampire announced a cover of the song "Date With A Vampyre" from the artist "Screaming Tribesmen".43

== Musical style and influences ==
Vampires Everywhere!'s sound spans several genres, including metalcore, post-hardcore, industrial metal, alternative metal, shock rock, and gothic rock.

Noisecreep described the band as "an ultra-catchy hybrid of goth, metalcore and pop". The band maintained an emo and goth image with horror themes in their lyrics, mainly around vampires. Lead singer Michael Vampire uses screamed and clean vocals, having already used synthesizer and autotune effects, especially at the beginning of the band's career. Vampires Everywhere!'s influences include Slipknot, Atreyu, Cannibal Corpse, Dimmu Borgir, The Black Dahlia Murder, Children of Bodom, As I Lay Dying, Parkway Drive, August Burns Red, Death, Obituary, Theatres des Vampires, Aiden, AFI, Misfits, Marilyn Manson, Ministry and Behemoth.

Regarding the band's vampire themes, Michael Vampire has stated "We didn't get inspired by Twilight or True Blood at all. I love True Blood and own season 1, but all of our influences come from the classics. By classics I mean The Lost Boys, Nosferatu, Bram Stoker's Dracula, Bela Lugosi, Fright Night, and more."

== Members ==
Current members

- Michael "Vampire" Orlando – lead vocals (2009–2013, 2015–2016, 2021–present)
- Jesse James Smith – drums (2021–present)
- Michael "Ghost" Rodd – guitars (2023–present)
- Brandon Burke – bass, backing vocals (2023–present)

Former members

- Jessica "J_Killa" Leigh – keyboards, synthesizers (2009–2010)
- Zak "Night" Dunn – lead guitar (2009–2010)
- Alexander "Rogue" Hernandez – bass (2009–2011)
- David "Darko" Hernandez – drums (2009–2011)
- Aaron "Graves" Martin – rhythm guitar (2009–2013)
- Charles Philip "Kross" Anthony – bass (2011–2012), lead guitar (2010–2011)
- DJ "Black" Blackard – lead guitar (2011–2013)
- Miles Rogers – bass (2012–2013)
- Chris Paterson – rhythm guitar (2013)
- Frankie Sil – bass (2013)
- Matti Hoffman – guitars (2015–2016)
- Grey "Mr. Grey" Soto – bass (2015–2016)
- Joshua "J.J. Gun" Ingram – drums (2012–2013, 2015–2016)
- Craig Nello Pirtle – guitars (2021–2023)
- Jonny Sixx – bass (2021–2023)

Former touring members

- Adam Vex – bass (2012–2013)

Timeline

== Discography ==
=== Albums ===
Year	Album	Label	Chart positions		
Year	Album	Label	US Indie	US Hard Rock	US Heat
2011	Kiss the Sun Goodbye	Hollywood Waste	43	19	4
2012	Hellbound and Heartless	Hollywood Waste	—	22	9
2016	Ritual	Vampires Everywhere!	—	—	—
2025	The Devil Made Me Do It	Dark Kingdom Records	—	—	—
"—" denotes a release that did not chart.

=== EP ===
- 2010: Lost in the Shadows
- 2021: The Awakening
- 2023: BELLADONNA

=== Singles ===
- 2010: Immortal Love
- 2010: Undead Heart
- 2012: I Can't Breathe
- 2012: Drug of Choice
- 2012: Star of 666
- 2016: Perfect Lie
- 2016: Take Me to Church (Hozier cover)
- 2016: Truth in You
- 2021: Witch
- 2021: Death of Me
- 2021: The Hills (The Weeknd cover)
- 2022: Tear Me Down
- 2023: Cry Little Sister (Gerard McMahon cover) – No. 34 Mainstream Rock Airplay
- 2024: Cry Little Sister (Revamped) with (Skold)
- 2024: White Wedding
- 2026: Dead In The Mourning Alive At Night (featuring Dennis Lee of Alesana)
