= November-7 =

Swiss metal rock band

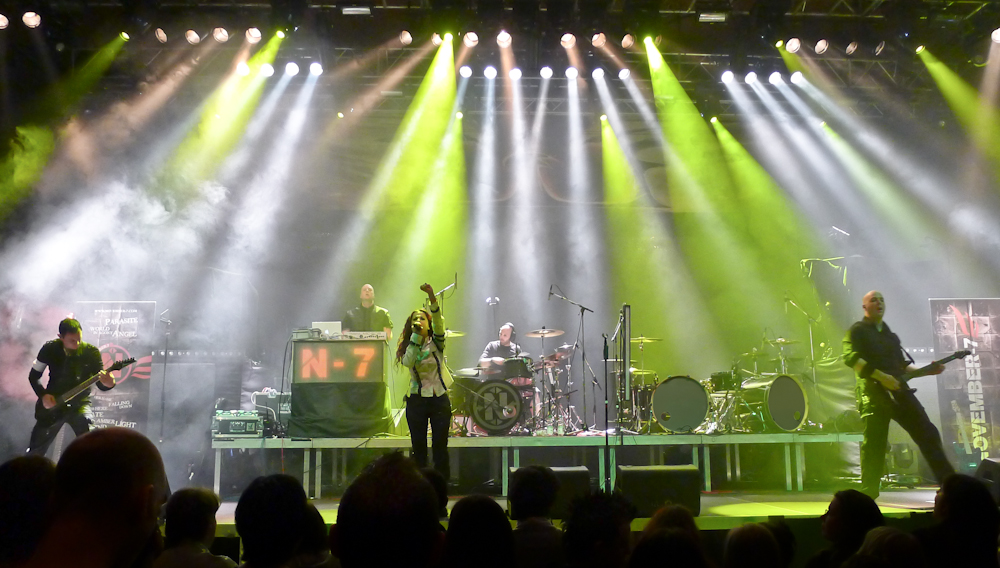
- November-7 live ( Opening for Within Temptation )

Background information
- Origin: Switzerland
- Genres: Metal
- Years active: 2005–present
- Labels: Dark-Sound Prod
- Members: Anna; Stéphane; Romain; Machine Man
- Past members: Yann Berger; Gil Reber; Matt; Sieg
- Website: Official website

November-7 is a Swiss-based metal band from Neuchâtel. Formed in 2005, the group is known for its mix of guitar-based metal with electro influences along with melodic vocal lines and orchestral arrangements.

Between 2006 and 2010 they released several records and DVDs and in 2011 they launched their first full-length studio album, "Season 3" (Daily Rock Records / Musikvertrieb) mixed by the legendary Stefan Glaumann (Rammstein, Within Temptation, Deathstars), which received excellent reviews throughout Europe and the US.

Their second album, "Awaraxid 7mg", followed in 2014. The tracks of this opus revolve around the creation of a brand new drug whose effect is to remind people who they really are, with the consequent realization that, if they are not happy with their life, they bear the privilege and the burden of realizing their true self. The record received tremendous feedback both from the international media and the fans. November-7 open for well-established artists such as Marilyn Manson, Within Temptation, Sabaton, Paradise Lost, Lacuna Coil.

In 2012 and 2016 they toured the UK, Germany, Belgium, Austria, Netherlands, Czech Republic and Poland.

In 2018 and 2022, the band releases their opus "Overload" made up of two EPs of 5 songs each.

== History ==
=== Formation and EPs (2005-2008) ===
Guitarist Stéphane and Vocalist Anna formed November-7 in 2005 and quickly released their first EP "Mesmerised" (2006). Recruiting guitarist Yann Berger and drummer Gil Reber that year, they started playing local venues and establishing their reputation as a live act.

While "Mesmerised" established their style, it was 2007's "Angel" and its eponymous EP that got November-7 their first media attention and local radio airplay, and spread the band's reputation further afield.

=== "Alive!" (2008-2010) ===
In 2008, a show in Neuchâtel gave the band an opportunity to record their live show. The result was the live album/DVD set "Alive!" which immediately caught the attention of specialist magazines such as Hard Rock Mag, Metal Edge Magazine and Synthetics Mag.

Reber left the band in 2009, and was replaced by Sieg. On the back of this lineup change, with positive reviews, a steady stream of gigs across the country, November-7 started work in earnest on their first full-length studio album.

=== "Season 3" (2010-2012) ===
November-7 performs at Festi'Neuch in 2012

Throughout 2010, live shows throughout Switzerland were well received. Berger was replaced by Matt in January 2010, and recordings for the band's debut album went on throughout the year. In Autumn 2010, Stéphane and Anna went to Stockholm to mix the album at Toytown Studios with producer Stefan Glaumann ("Rammstein", "Clawfinger", "Within Temptation").

The resulting album, "Season 3" (2011), was released in February 2011 and gathered excellent reviews from magazines and webzines throughout the world. The album was released by record label Daily Rock Records and was distributed across Europe (Musikvertrieb/Season of Mist) and in the USA (Sonic Cathedral).

The album's popularity and the band's live reputation lead to the band being asked to open for such world-renowned acts as Lacuna Coil, Within Temptation, Paradise Lost, Soen, and to the band's first US appearance in the form of a showcase in Seattle in October 2011. During this time, Stéphane B. "Machine Man" officially joined the band on samples, having played with them on a session basis since 2008.

In June 2012 the band also opened for "Marilyn Manson" for his show in November-7's home town of Neuchâtel.

=== "Awaraxid 7mg" (2014 - 2016) ===
With their second album, "Awaraxid 7mg", released in 2014, they create a brand new drug whose effect is to remind people who they really are. The record receives tremendous feedback and allows the band to tour again Europe, playing in Germany, Poland, Czech Republic, Belgium and the Netherlands.

=== "Overload 1.0" and "Overload 2.0" (2018 - 2022) ===
In 2018 and 2022 the band releases two EPs of a 5-song each titled "Overload 1.0" and "Overload 2.0". In these two records the key theme is the state of being overwhelmed which is typical of today's life. This state coupled with the uncertainty of the future dominate all the songs in these records.

== Band members ==
Current members

- Anna - vocals (2005–present)
- Stéphane - lead guitar - bass - programming (2005–present)
- Romain - drums (2023–present)
- Machine Man - samplers (2011–present)

Former members

- Yann Berger - rhythm guitar (2006-2010)
- Gil Reber - drums (2006-2009)
- Matt Walters - rhythm guitar (2010–2012)
- Sieg - drums (2009–2023)

Session members

- Emmi Lichtenhahn - bass guitar (2006–2018)

== Discography ==
Studio albums

- 2011 - Season 3
- 2014 - AWARAXID 7 mg
- 2022 - Overload 2.0

Live albums & DVD

- 2008 - Alive!
- 2013 - Live in Belgium - CD

EP's

- 2006 - Mesmerize (Season I)
- 2007 - Angel (Season II)
- 2018 - Overload 1.0

== Videography ==
- 2007 - Angel - Music video
- 2008 - Alive! - Live DVD
- 2010 - Parasite - Music video
- 2011 - In My Mind - Music video
- 2013 - Live in Belgium - Live DVD
- 2014 - Another Day - Music Video
- 2015 - Alive? - Music Video
- 2019 - Loose Connection - Music Video
- 2020 - Running out of Time - Music Video
- 2022 - Stop Me - Music Video
- 2022 - Stronger - Music Video
- 2023 - Kill Your Monsters - Music Video
