= Skarlett Riot =

English rock band

- Origin: Scunthorpe, England
- Genres: Hard rock; alternative metal; melodic metalcore
- Years active: 2010–present
- Labels: Despotz Records; Record Union
- Members: Chloe "Skarlett" Drinkwater; Danny Oglesby; Luke Oglesby; Tim Chambers
- Past members: Tom Mansfield; Martin Shepherd
- Website: www.skarlettriot.co.uk

Skarlett Riot is an English rock band, formed in Scunthorpe, England, in 2010.

== History ==
The band members met for the first time in school, where they were known under the name 'Fuzion'. A short time later, they renamed themselves Skarlett Riot and produced their first EP, which was released on 4 November 2010.

Two years later, the second EP called "Villain" was released, with which they gained their first wave of fame. In 2013, they released their first single, "Faded Memory", which can be found on their debut album Tear Me Down, which was released in the same year. In the same year, bassist Tom Mansfield left the group. Martin Shepherd rehearsed with Skarlett Riot for the first time before being officially appointed as the new bassist on 16 January 2014. Together, they performed at the Eat You Alive Festival.

On 16 February 2015, the band released their third EP called We Are the Brave and supported Gus G. on his UK tour.

In 2017, the single "Feel" was released, which can be found on the previously released EP, Sentience. Both a music video and a remix of Zardonic were released in a short time.

On 27 October 2017, Skarlett Riot released their second album Regenerate.

In early 2019, the band announced the departure of bassist Martin Shepherd. Tim Chambers formally joined the band as their new bassist at the end of 2019.

On 7 May 2021, Skarlett Riot released their third album Invicta.

== Band members ==
Current

- Chloe "Skarlett" Drinkwater – lead vocals, rhythm guitar (2010–present)
- Danny Oglesby – lead guitar, backing vocals (2010–present)
- Luke Oglesby – drums (2010–present)
- Tim Chambers – bass guitar, backing vocals (2019–present)

Former

- Tom Mansfield – bass guitar, backing vocals (2010–2013)
- Martin Shepherd – bass guitar, backing vocals (2014–2019)

== Discography ==
=== Studio albums ===
- 2013: Tear Me Down
- 2017: Regenerate
- 2021: Invicta
- 2024: Caelestia

=== EPs ===
- 2010: Skarlett Riot
- 2012: Villain
- 2015: We Are the Brave
- 2016: Sentience

=== Singles ===
- 2013: "Faded Memory"
- 2014: "House of Cards"
- 2015: "Ignite"
- 2016: "Voices"
- 2017: "Feel"
- 2017: "Feel (Zardonic Remix)"
- 2017: "Break"
- 2017: "Warrior"
- 2017: "Affliction"
- 2020: "Human"
- 2020: "Gravity"
- 2021: "Underwater"
- 2021: "Black Cloud"
- 2023: "Chemicals"
- 2023: "Hold Tight"
- 2024: "Lullaby"
