= The Black (EP) =

Revelations: The Black EP

EP by William Control
- Released: February 17, 2017
- Studio: Hell's Half Acre
- Genre: Darkwave; synthpop
- Length: 13:38
- Label: Control
- Producer: Kenneth Fletcher

William Control chronology
Revelations: The Pale EP (2016)	Revelations: The Black EP (2017)	Revelations: The Red EP (2017)

Singles from Revelations: The Black EP
- 1. "Analog Flesh In A Digital World" Released: February 10, 2017; 2. "Knife Play" Released: April 1, 2017; 3. "All I Need" Released: May 13, 2017

Professional ratings
Review scores
Source	Rating
Electrozombies	3.75/5 stars
VultureHound	4/5 stars

Revelations: The Black EP is the third EP by American group William Control. It is the second in a series of four EPs that make up the fifth studio album, Revelations, the other three being The Pale, The Red and The White, after the Four Horsemen of the Apocalypse. It was released by Control Records on February 17, 2017, and peaked at number six on the Billboard Dance/Electronic Albums chart and number one on the Heatseekers chart.

The first single was Analog Flesh In A Digital World, released on February 10, 2017. It was accompanied by a music video shot and directed by Jacob Johnston in Los Angeles in January 2017. Johnston also directed the Knife Play video, released on April 1. All I Need was once again filmed in LA, at a later date, by Stephanie Carrasco and Spenser Leeds, and released on May 13.

The EP was recorded at Control's Hell's Half Acre studio and was produced and engineered by Kenneth Fletcher, and engineered and mixed by Axel Otero of the band Lay Your Ghost. It was mastered by John Troxell. Fans were invited down to the Control Merch shop to record gang vocals.

== Track listing ==
No.	Title	Length
1.	"Analog Flesh In A Digital World"	3:04
2.	"All I Need"	3:56
3.	"Knife Play"	3:35
4.	"Velvet Rose"	3:13
Total length:		13:48

== Charts ==
Chart (2017)	Peak position
US Dance/Electronic Albums (Billboard)	6
US Heatseekers Albums (Billboard)	1
US Independent Albums (Billboard)	6

== Personnel ==
All credits adapted from liner notes.

- Kenneth Fletcher – producer, engineer, artwork, layout
- Axel Otero – engineer, mixing
- John Troxell – mastering
