= The Pale (EP) =

Revelations: The Pale EP

EP by William Control
- Released: October 14, 2016
- Studio: Hell's Half Acre
- Genre: Darkwave; synthpop
- Length: 18:09
- Label: Control
- Producer: Kenneth Fletcher

William Control chronology
| Skeleton Strings 2 (2014) | Revelations: The Pale EP (2016) | Revelations: The Black EP (2017) |

Singles from Revelations: The Pale EP
- 1. "The Monster" Released: September 4, 2016; 2. "Confess" Released: October 26, 2016; 3. "When The Love Is Pain" Released: November 12, 2016; 4. "Mother Superior" Released: January 25, 2017

Professional ratings
Review scores
| Source | Rating |
|---|---|
| Electrozombies | 4.25/5 stars |
| VultureHound | 3.5/5 stars |

Revelations: The Pale EP is the first in a series of four EPs that make up Revelations, the fifth studio album by William Control. The other three are The Black, The Red and The White, after the Four Horsemen of the Apocalypse. It was released by Control Records on October 14, 2016 and peaked at number one on both the Billboard Dance/Electronic Albums chart and the Heatseekers chart.

A video for The Monster was shot by Terry Matlin in New York City in July 2016 and released on September 4. Confess was filmed by Kenneth Fletcher in an Edinburgh cemetery during the band's September 2016 UK Synths and Sinners Tour and released on October 26. When The Love Is Pain followed on November 12, and it was directed by Jacob Johnston. Mother Superior, directed by Kevin Preston, completed the quartet on January 25, 2017.

The EP was recorded at Control's Hell's Half Acre studio and was produced and engineered by Kenneth Fletcher, and engineered and mixed by Axel Otero of the band Lay Your Ghost. It was mastered by John Troxell. Fans were invited down to the Control Merch shop to record gang vocals.

== Track listing ==
All tracks are written by William Francis, Kenneth Fletcher and Axel Otero

| No. | Title | Length |
|---|---|---|
| 1. | "The Monster" | 4:12 |
| 2. | "Confess" | 4:10 |
| 3. | "When The Love Is Pain" | 4:04 |
| 4. | "Mother Superior" | 5:43 |
| Total length: | | 18:09 |

== Charts ==
| Chart (2016) | Peak position |
|---|---|
| US Alternative Albums (Billboard) | 13 |
| US Dance/Electronic Albums (Billboard) | 1 |
| US Heatseekers Albums (Billboard) | 1 |
| US Independent Albums (Billboard) | 14 |
| US Rock Albums (Billboard) | 26 |

== Personnel ==
All credits adapted from liner notes.

- Kenneth Fletcher – producer, engineer, artwork, layout
- Axel Otero – engineer, mixing
- John Troxell – mastering
