= Lisa Johnson =

American photographer

Lisa Johnson is an American rock photographer known for her work with bands such as Reel Big Fish, Nirvana, Rage Against the Machine and Smashing Pumpkins.

In 2014, "Decades: Warped Since 1995-Through The Lens of Lisa Johnson Rock Photographer" was displayed on the entire Warped Tour. The mobile gallery was a retrospective of Lisa Johnson's two decades documenting the tour. She has also earned the title of Official Warped Tour Photographer.

== The Warped Tour ==
Johnson began documenting the Vans Warped Tour through photographs in 1995, the tour's inaugural year. Through her ongoing efforts and consistency of quality, she was eventually awarded the title of "Official Warped Tour Photographer." In 2014, "Decades: Warped Since 1995 – Through The Lens of Lisa Johnson Rock Photographer" was unveiled and presented as a traveling collection, displayed at every stop on the tour. The mobile gallery was a retrospective of Lisa Johnson's two decades documenting the Warped Tour. Johnson continues her duties as Official Warped Tour Photography on an ongoing basis.
