= Dahvie Vanity =

American musician and alleged sexual predator (born 1984)

- Vanity performing in 2011
- Born: Jesus David Torres; September 5, 1984 (age 42); North Carolina, U.S.
- Other names: The Elite Hair God; Kawaii Monster; The Most Vivid Nightmares
- Years active: 2006–present
- Musical career
- Origin: Orlando, Florida, U.S.
- Genres: Electronica; electropop; dance-pop; crunkcore
- Occupations: Singer; songwriter
- Instruments: Vocals; guitar; keyboards
- Years active: 2006–2016; 2017–2019; 2025–present
- Member of: Blood on the Dance Floor

Jesus David Torres (born September 5, 1984), known professionally as Dahvie Vanity, is an American singer and songwriter, known as the founder of the electronic and crunkcore band Blood on the Dance Floor, and the group's sole member as of 2026. Since 2007, at least 21 women have made sexual assault, child sexual abuse, and rape allegations against Vanity, with one leading to his arrest in 2009.

Vanity first rose to prominence on Myspace under the moniker "The Elite Hair God" before forming Blood on the Dance Floor in 2006. At the peak of their commercial success within the scene subculture, the band released several studio albums, including Evolution (2012), which reached the Billboard 200, and maintained a visible presence in youth culture through merchandise in retailers like Hot Topic and multiple appearances on the Vans Warped Tour, as well as performing the theme song for the Smosh cartoon series Oishi High School Battle. The group released nine studio albums before briefly breaking up in 2016 following Jay Von Monroe's departure. It was reformed by Vanity the following year, initially with his then-partner Fallon Vendetta. After his break-up with Vendetta and her subsequent departure from the group, Vanity became the sole member of the group. Since 2019, Vanity has performed under the name Kawaii Monster and most recently The Most Vivid Nightmares.

At least 21 women have come forward with misconduct allegations against Vanity, including sexual assault, child molestation, and rape, between 2006 and 2015. A central figure in these allegations is Damien Leonhardt (formerly known as Jessi Slaughter), who became a viral meme and cyberbullying victim in 2010. Years later, Leonhardt publicly alleged that the rumors sparking the original harassment were true, stating that Vanity began grooming and sexually abusing them in 2009 when they were only 10 years old. Those allegations, along with dozens of others, led to significant professional repercussions, including the removal of Blood on the Dance Floor's music from major streaming platforms like Spotify and Google Play for violating content guidelines. Former bandmates including Garrett Ecstasy, who left the band in 2009, and Jayy Von Monroe, who left in 2016, have described Vanity as a sexual predator; Monroe accused Vanity of abuse as well. Jeffree Star and New Years Day members Ash Costello and Nikki Misery have stated that they observed Vanity engage in questionable or illegal sexual behavior. Many of the accusers were underage during the alleged attacks.

== Early life and MySpace ==
Jesus David Torres was born on September 5, 1984, in North Carolina, but his family later relocated to Orlando, Florida. Vanity attended public school during his teenage years, where he reportedly faced significant bullying due to his scene aesthetic and individual style. He has stated in interviews that he viewed his appearance and skills—specifically applying makeup and styling hair—as a form of art, which he began developing during his youth.

Before his music career, he established a significant online presence on MySpace during the mid-2000s, where he was widely known by the moniker "The Elite Hair God". During this period, he branded himself primarily as a hairstylist and clothing designer within the alternative scene subculture, gaining a large following for his spiky multi-coloured hair and distinct aesthetic.

== Music career ==
=== Blood on the Dance Floor ===
After falling out as a touring musician with multiple local musical acts in the Orlando, Florida area during 2006, Torres formed a musical group with friends Matty "M" Malaret, Christopher Mongillo, and Rebecca Fugate. Initially the group (then titled "Love the Fashion") was considered a joke, but developed into Blood on the Dance Floor in the summer of 2007. Vanity stated in an interview that Jeffree Star is a huge influence on Blood on the Dance Floor, and also stated that he was inspired by Marilyn Manson. Malaret left the group in late 2007 before the group's self-released first album, Let's Start a Riot, in April 2008. Citing the inability to tour, Mongillo and Fugate also left the band shortly thereafter.

During the recording of their second album, It's Hard to Be a Diamond in a Rhinestone World, the band was picked up by producer and writer Rusty Wilmot. During the recording of this album, Garrett Marshal McLaughlin (Garrett Ecstasy) was recruited to do backup vocals and screaming. The CD was self-released in October 2008. Only 300 copies were made. Vanity and Ecstasy recorded the singles "Siq with a Q" and "Suicide Club" as a duo in 2008, and released three extended plays over the first half of 2009, I Scream I Scream, OMFG Sneak Peak, and Extended Play. The duo embarked on the OMFG Tour with other local bands Electric Valentine, Weston Buck, The Greenlight District, and The Crush in promotion of their upcoming album then titled OMFG.

After Ecstasy's departure from the band in light of rape allegations against Vanity, Vanity asked Jayy Von Monroe (who had been a fan of the band before joining) to join the group as Ecstasy's replacement. Many of the songs originally recorded with Ecstasy intended for the upcoming album OMFG were re-recorded with new vocals by Von Monroe. The previous concept of the OMFG album was scrapped, and rebranded as Epic, set for release in 2010. The band went on tour over spring and summer 2010 to promote the release of Epic. With Jeffree Star they recorded three songs for that album. The collaborations with Jeffree Star were short-lived because like former member Garrett Ecstasy, Star had also accused Vanity of being a pedophile and a predator, claiming to have witnessed questionable behavior. Star later chose to go back on his accusations due to feeling like the band was being victimized. He was then featured on their 2014 single "Poison Apple", from the album Bitchcraft. As with the previous conflict with Garrett, the three singles featuring Star's vocals were re-recorded with vocals by Von Monroe, and the original tracks were not featured on the final album.

In October 2010, the album Epic charted No. 5 on the Dance/Electronic Billboard chart. The band headlined the Epic Tour and the Epic Tour Part II in support of the album. Even before the release of Epic, recording began for Blood on the Dance Floor's fourth album, All the Rage!!. The duo collaborated with several artists for the album, including Lady Nogrady, JJ Demon, and Nick Nasty. The album was preceded by several singles to promote the release, including "Yo Ho", and "P.L.U.R.", and "Bewitched", which became the band's most well-known song. The band later embarked on Warped Tour 2011 in June 2011, and released the album while on tour.

The music video for their hit single from the album Bewitched featured Nicole "Lady" Nogrady. She later shared that she felt disrespected by the band throughout the album's production and during the music video shoot. Nogrady revealed that she had to directly confront the band to make sure her name was properly credited for her contributions. The song was subsequently performed by other female vocalists in place of Nogrady at live shows, and was re-recorded with vocals by Haley Rose for their 2013 acoustic album Blood Unplugged. The album peaked at No. 13 on the Billboard Top Electronic Albums chart. At the end of 2011, the duo headlined the All the Rage Tour and was planning the 'Tis the Season to be Killing Tour.

In celebration of Blood on the Dance Floor's fourth anniversary, a digital compilation album titled The Legend of Blood on the Dance Floor was set to be released on Halloween. The compilation's release date was pushed back, originally planned to be released as a CD, it was released as a SoundCloud playlist instead. The compilation features remastered versions of songs from the band's first four albums.

Blood on the Dance Floor's fifth album, Evolution, was released on June 19, 2012, along with a deluxe edition that featured acoustic versions of two songs. Two music videos and four singles were released from the album. The album featured tracks in collaboration with Haley Rose, Amelia Arsenic, Shawn Brandon, Joel Madden of the band Good Charlotte, Elena Vladimirova, and Deuce. As a thank you to their fans they released the three-song free EP Clubbed to Death! on June 20, 2012, for free through an app on Facebook. Their sixth EP, The Anthem of the Outcast, was released on October 30, 2012.

Rumors of a breakup in 2013 were proven to be a hoax with Vanity completely denying that the group was disbanding. Bad Blood was slated for release in September 2013. On February 18, 2013, the lead single "I Refuse to Sink! (Fuck the Fame)" was released, followed by the second single, "Crucified by Your Lies", and a third, "Something Grimm", on July 2, 2013.

Andrew "Drew" Apathy joined in early 2014, and a new album, Bitchcraft, was released in June 2014. Their single "We're Takin over!" featuring Deuce was released February 7. They released the album Scissors in 2016, the band's final release to feature Jayy Von Monroe due to Von Monroe leaving the group shortly afterward. After Vonn Monroe's departure from the band, Vanity established multiple new solo music projects such as "Sinners Are Winners" and Master of Death.

In April 2017, Vanity announced that there would be a new member, and that Blood on the Dance Floor would be returning on May 5 of that year without Jayy Von Monroe. In May 2017, it was revealed that Dahvie's girlfriend, Fallon Vendetta, had temporarily joined Blood on the Dance Floor. With Vendetta, they released the singles "Resurrection Spell", "Love Like Voodoo", "Six Feet Under", "Yo Ho 2 (Pirate's Life)", "Ghosting" and "Destroy". Their album Kawaii Monster was released on October 31, 2017. Kawaii Monster pre-orders included a second disc, a remastered edition of Let's Start a Riot. The band also released an exclusive EP, You Are the Heart. In 2018, they released Haunted, followed by Cinema Erotica and You Are the Heart. Vendetta departed the group shortly afterward following a breakup with Vanity, leaving him the sole remaining member of the group.

Although the band had been inactive since the breakup with Fallon Vendetta in 2019 and multiple rape allegations against Vanity between 2020 and 2021, in Spring 2025 Vanity teased an upcoming final Blood on the Dance Floor record on his "Dark Arts Official" Instagram page, with two singles being released on June 13, 2025. The complete album, titled Epidemic, was released on October 31, 2025. This was later revealed to be a marketing stunt, and Vanity would go back on claims that this is their final album, with a new record planned for 2026, titled Ripe With Decay.

=== Other projects ===
In 2012, Vanity as Blood on the Dance Floor performed the theme song for the Oishi High School Battle series on the Shut Up! Cartoons channel created by Anthony Padilla and Ian Hecox of Smosh, and made a cameo appearance in the series as himself in the intro sequence, alongside Monroe. The series' theme song was a customized version of the band's typical crunkcore style and was heavily featured in every episode of the first three seasons. Following the public exposure of Vanity as a child sexual predator and further sexual assault allegations, all episodes of Oishi High School Battle were eventually removed by Smosh from the Shut Up! Cartoons channel.

On September 5, 2019, Vanity released a solo album as Blood on the Dance Floor titled Hollywood Death Star featuring singles such as "Sweet Like Popsicles" and "Sex Rx". After this album, Vanity seemingly retired the Blood on the Dance Floor moniker to focus on his alternate music projects such as "Kawaii Monster" and "The Most Vivid Nightmares" as well as his "Dark Arts Official" merchline. On January 1, 2021, Vanity released a new version of Blood on the Dance Floor's "Bewitched" as "Bewitched Reimagined" featuring singer Sammy Beare. Vanity has continued to release music and merchandise by himself under both "The Most Vivid Nightmares" and "Dark Arts Official".

== Sexual offences and other criminal activity ==
Vanity's abuse of and misconduct with children was reported as early as 2006. Since 2009, at least 21 women have made sexual assault, child sexual abuse, and rape allegations against Vanity, with one leading to his arrest in 2009. In the years following the 2009 arrest, numerous further allegations of sexual misconduct have been brought against him. Documented testimonials reveal these women were allegedly sexually assaulted, raped, or groomed by Vanity between 2006 and 2015. Many of these accusers were underage at the time of the alleged incidents, including two who were reportedly 13 years old. A prominent case involves Damien Leonhardt (formerly known as Jessi Slaughter), who alleged in 2020 that Vanity began grooming and sexually abusing them in 2009 when they were 10 years old.

=== Initial sexual abuse allegation ===
In 2009, Vanity was arrested in Denver, Colorado, on allegations of sexual assault. The arrest occurred after his then-bandmate, Garrett "Ecstasy" McLaughlin, and another witness reported seeing Vanity alone on a tour bus with two teenage girls. One of the girls alleged that she had been coerced into performing a sexual act. Despite the arrest, criminal charges were never formally filed, and the case was dropped after the victim reportedly decided not to press charges.

=== Jessi Slaughter grooming and sexual abuse case ===
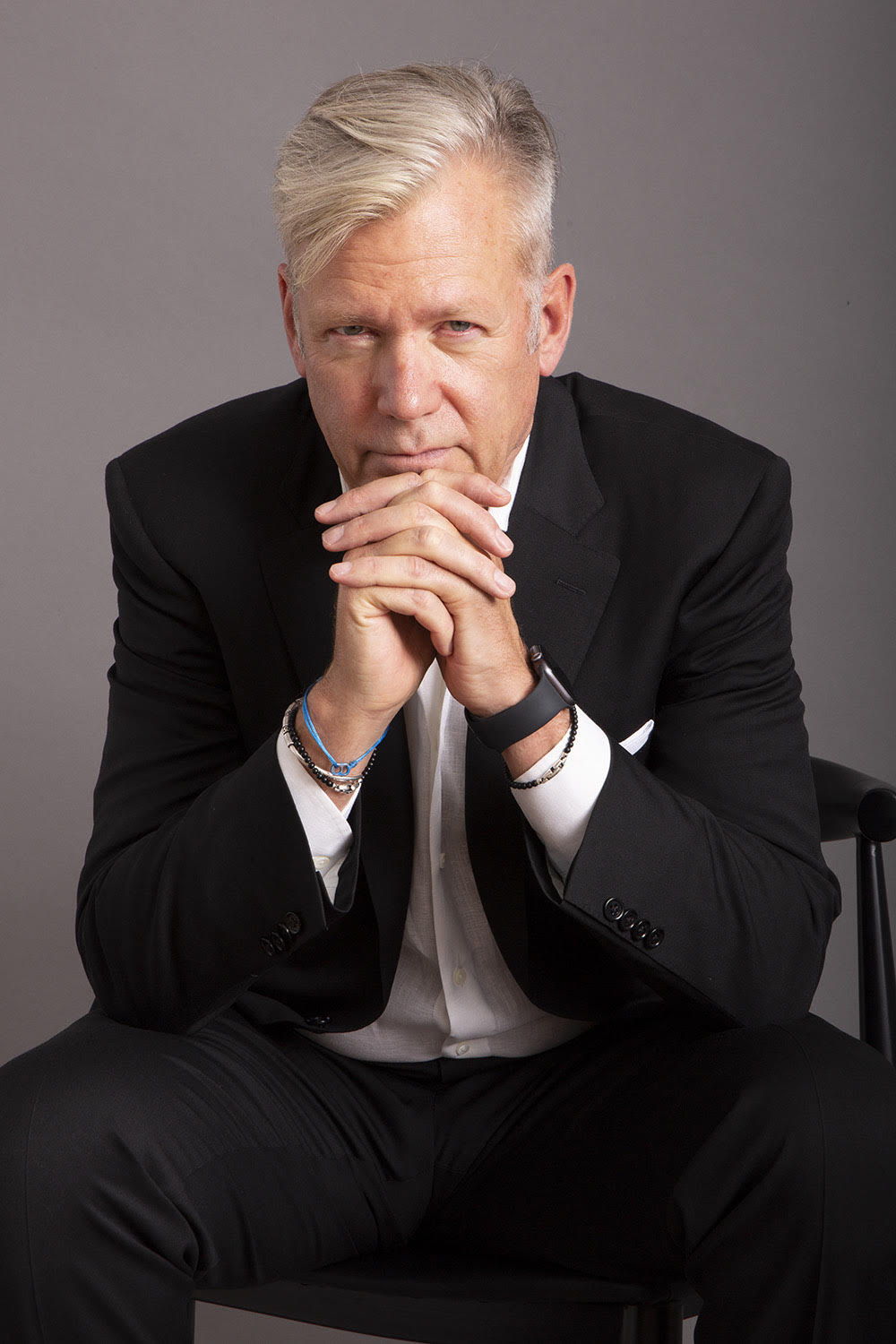
Chris Hansen announced an investigation on Vanity in 2020, including having multiple interviews with those, including Damien Leonhardt (formerly known as Jessi Slaughter), who claim Vanity abused or raped them.

Damien Leonhardt (formerly known as Jessi Slaughter) is a central figure in these allegations, and became a viral meme in 2010 after their father's "you done goofed" video went viral. Leonhardt's videos were made in response to accusations that a friend had raped Leonhardt, and that Leonhardt had a sexual relationship with Vanity while Leonhardt was a minor. This resulted in a campaign of telephone and internet harassment against Leonhardt and their family, which was attributed to 4chan and members of the internet-based group Anonymous. Leonhardt's father's reaction made the taunting worse, and the video of his reactions received more views than any of Leonhardt's previous recordings, with several quotes from his speech becoming memes themselves. He was later arrested in March 2011 for abusing Leonhardt in an argument when he punched them, causing them to have bloody and swollen lips, according to a police report, and later died from a heart attack while in custody at a police station in early 2011.

Vanity and fellow bandmate Jayy Von Monroe directly participated in the taunting of Leonhardt, initially by releasing a parody of Leonhardt's video, with Von Monroe in the role of Leonhardt and Vanity in the role of Leonhardt's father. They also released a song, "You Done Goofed", from the album Epic about Leonhardt and Vanity's alleged experiences with them, with mocking lyrics including "We watched as the world watched you cry" and "My name and reputation won't be the target of a slut". Vanity intentionally released the song on Leonhardt's 12th birthday, and it resulted in Leonhardt attempting suicide by overdosing. Leonhardt stated that they had lost all of their friends as a result of the harassment. Because of the harassment, Leonhardt was placed under police protection, and the family's home was under police surveillance. Leonhardt underwent counseling for harassment. Leonhardt later came out as transgender and non-binary, and started going by the name Damien Leonhardt.

On March 2, 2018, Leonhardt made a Tumblr post in which they publicly accused Vanity of rape for the first time. In March 2020, Leonhardt told journalist Chris Hansen of To Catch a Predator that Vanity sexually assaulted them in April 2009, when Leonhardt was 10 and Vanity was 24. They were interviewed as part of Hansen's YouTube channel Have a Seat with Chris Hansen; Hansen described Leonhardt as Vanity's "victim zero". Leonhardt said they were at a party at which Vanity was present and while they were in the bathroom of the house, Vanity coerced them to perform oral sex on him.

During the next 16 months, Leonhardt stated that Vanity had violently raped them under the guise of BDSM-style sexual activity. In 2010, Leonhardt told a classmate that Vanity had molested them, but later told Insider that they used the term as a joke, and viewed the relationship as consensual. Leonhardt also stated that had they not mentioned Vanity to classmates – which led to the case being discussed online – the abuse would have continued. Towards the end of their interview with Hansen, when he asked Leonhardt what they would say to Vanity if he were watching the interview, they replied: "You done goofed." Leonhardt's interview led to public opinion shifting in their favour and against Vanity.

=== Subsequent sexual abuse allegations and professional repercussions ===
In 2019, 21 women accused Vanity of sexual assault, child molestation, and rape with many of the women saying that the attacks had taken place while they were under the age of consent. This led to the FBI beginning an investigation into the allegations against Vanity. In early 2020, Hansen announced his own investigation on Vanity, including having multiple interviews with those who claim Vanity abused or raped them. His investigation into Vanity occurred around the same time as his investigation into the controversial YouTuber Onision, after similar abuse allegations were made against him. At the time, the FBI confirmed that they were also investigating the allegations against Vanity. As of 2025, no criminal charges have been brought against Vanity.

Former bandmates Garrett Ecstasy, who left the band in 2009, and Jayy Von Monroe, who left in 2016, have described Vanity as a sexual predator. In his own interview with Hansen, Monroe accused Vanity of abuse as well, stating that Vanity forced him to tour without his HIV medication which caused him to nearly develop AIDS. Von Monroe also stated that he later made a full recovery after leaving the band in 2016. Jeffree Star and New Years Day members Ash Costello and Nikki Misery have stated that they observed Vanity engage in questionable or illegal sexual behavior during one of the Vans Warped Tours and also during the "All the Rage Tour 2012" in support of their third studio album of the same name around the early 2010s. Many of the accusers were underage during the alleged attacks.

In response to the allegations, Combichrist removed Blood on the Dance Floor from their tour in 2014. Merchandising website Big Cartel removed the band's products in 2018 in response to the allegations, while Spotify and Google Play removed the band's music in April 2019 for violating their guidelines regarding prohibited content. Vanity has responded to the accusations on multiple occasions, usually with denial, threats or evasion.

== Personal life ==
Vanity was in a significant relationship with Fallon Vendetta, to whom he was also engaged. Vendetta temporarily joined Blood on the Dance Floor as a member in 2017, collaborating on albums like Kawaii Monster. The couple broke up in 2018, which subsequently led to her departure from the band.

At one point, Vanity had a long-term partner named Angel. This relationship reportedly ended following allegations of infidelity, with some accounts suggesting a potential marriage that resulted in divorce.

Vanity has publicly identified as bisexual across various media platforms.

== Discography ==
=== Albums as Blood on the Dance Floor ===
- Let's Start a Riot (2008)
- It's Hard to Be a Diamond in a Rhinestone World (2008)
- Epic (2010)
- All the Rage!! (2011)
- Evolution (2012)
- Bad Blood (2013)
- Bitchcraft (2014)
- Scissors (2016)
- Kawaii Monster (2017)
- Haunted (2018)
- Cinema Erotica (2018)
- You Are the Heart (2018)
- Hollywood Death Star (2019)
- Epidemic (2025)
- Ripe With Decay (2026)

=== Albums as Master of Death ===
- Master of Death (2015)

=== Albums as Sinners Are Winners ===
- For Beginners (2016)
- The Invocation (2017)

=== Albums as Kawaii Monster ===
- Poison Love (EP) (2019)
- Love from Hell (2019)
- The Balance (EP) (2020)
- Traptendo (2022)

=== Albums as The Most Vivid Nightmares ===
- Love Like Starlight (2022)
- Reavengeance Xo 2.0 (2023)
- Phantamasgoria the Album (2024)
- Darker Harder Louder (2025)

== See also ==
- Ian Watkins
