= Blood on the Dance Floor discography =

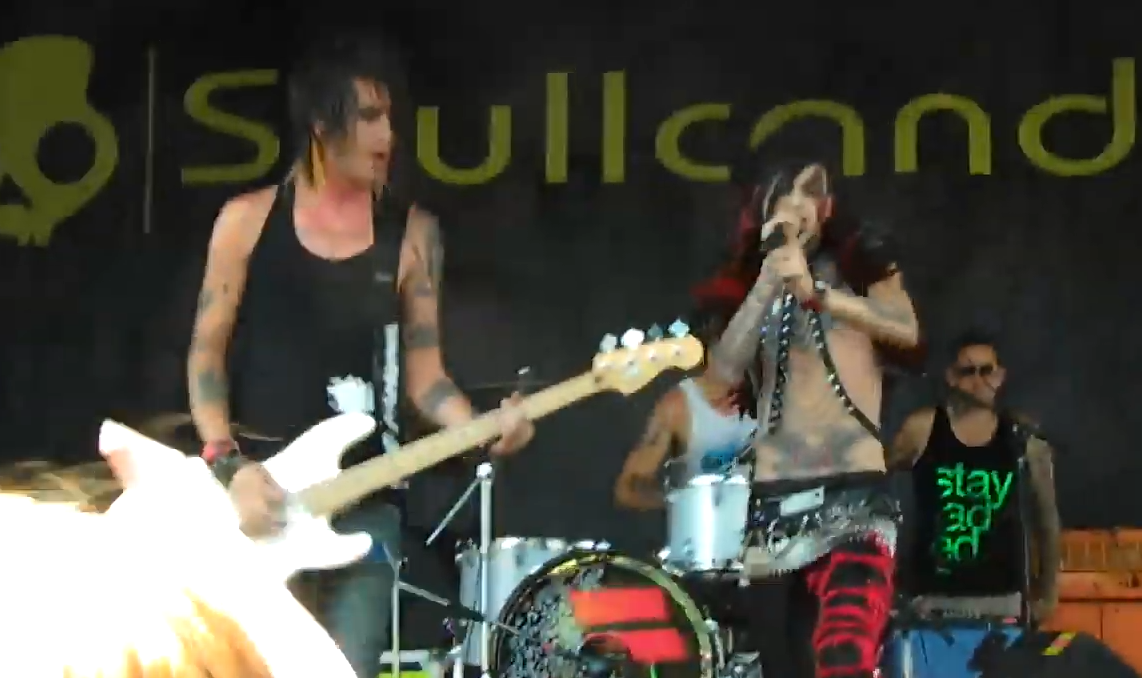
- Studio albums: 14
- EPs: 8
- Compilation albums: 3
- Singles: 42

The discography of American electropop band Blood on the Dance Floor consists of fourteen studio albums, three compilation albums, eight extended plays, and forty-two singles.

== Albums ==
=== Studio albums ===
List of albums, with selected chart positions
Title	Album details	Peak chart positions			
Title	Album details	US	US Dance	US Heat	US Indie
Let's Start a Riot	Released: April 16, 2008; Format: CD, Digital download; Label: Independent	—	—	—	—
It's Hard to Be a Diamond in a Rhinestone World	Released: September 12, 2008; Format: CD, digital download; Label: Independent	—	—	—	—
Epic	Released: October 5, 2010; Format: CD, digital download; Label: Candyland	—	5	12	—
All the Rage	Released: June 14, 2011; Format: CD, digital download; Label: Independent	—	13	26	—
Evolution	Released: June 19, 2012; Format: CD, digital download; Label: Dark Fantasy	42	1	—	8
Bad Blood	Released: September 3, 2013; Format: CD, digital download; Label: Dark Fantasy	137	2	—	29
Bitchcraft	Released: June 10, 2014; Format: CD, digital download, vinyl; Label: Dark Fantasy	—	18	—	—
Scissors	Released: September 30, 2016; Format: CD, digital download, vinyl; Label: Dark Fantasy	—	—	—	—
Kawaii Monster	Released: October 31, 2017; Formats: CD, Digital download; Label: Dark Fantasy	—	—	—	—
Haunted	Released: March 16, 2018; Formats: CD, Digital download; Label: Dark Fantasy	—	—	—	—
Cinema Erotica	Released: November 8, 2018; Formats: CD, Digital download; Label: Dark Fantasy	—	—	—	—
Hollywood Death Star	Released: September 5, 2019; Formats: CD, Digital download; Label: Dark Fantasy	—	—	—	—
Epidemic	Released: October 31, 2025; Formats: CD, Digital download; Label: Dark Fantasy	—	—	—	—
"—" denotes releases that did not chart.

=== Compilation albums ===
Title	Album details
The Revolution Pack	Released: October 30, 2012; Formats: Digital download; Label: Dark Fantasy
Blood Unplugged	Released: December 20, 2013; Formats: CD, digital download; Label: Dark Fantasy
RIP 2006-2016	Released: December 24, 2016; Formats: CD, Digital download; Label: Dark Fantasy

== Extended plays ==
List of EPs, with selected chart positions
Title	EP details	Peak chart positions	
Title	EP details	US	US Indie
I Scream I Scream	Released: March 9, 2009; Format: Digital download; Label: Independent	—	—
OMFG Sneak Peak!	Released: June 14, 2009; Format: Digital download; Label: Independent	—	—
Extended Play	Released: July 1, 2009; Format: Digital download; Label: Independent	—	—
Epic: The Remixes	Released: January 10, 2012; Format: Digital download; Label: Dark Fantasy	—	—
Clubbed to Death!	Released: June 20, 2012; Format: Digital download; Label: Dark Fantasy	—	—
The Anthem of the Outcast	Released: October 30, 2012; Format: CD, digital download; Label: Dark Fantasy	140	26
Cruel Pornography	Released: August 8, 2015; Format: CD, digital download; Label: Dark Fantasy	—	—
Emotional	Released: December 15, 2017; Format: CD, digital download; Label: Dark Fantasy	—	—
You Are the Heart	Released: January 22, 2018; Format: CD; Label: B.I.J. Records	—	—
"—" denotes releases that did not chart.

== Singles ==
Title	Year	Album
"Money and Hoes"	2008	Let's Start a Riot
"Save the Rave"	2008	It's Hard to be a Diamond in a Rhinestone World
"Blood on the Dance Floor (DJ Pickee Remix)"	2008	It's Hard to be a Diamond in a Rhinestone World
"S My D"	2008	It's Hard to be a Diamond in a Rhinestone World
"Suicide Club"	2008	I Scream I Scream
"Siq With a Q"	2008	I Scream I Scream
"Miss Bipolar (Love Fight)" (featuring Lolli Dolli)	2009	I Scream I Scream
"Looking Hot, Dangerous!"	2009	OMFG Sneak Peak
"Horrifically Delicious"	2009	Epic
"Success Is the Best Revenge"	2009	Epic
"Sexting"	2009	Epic
"Crunk Man"	2009	—N/a
"Designed to Kill"	2010	—N/a
"Inject Me Sweetly" (featuring Jeffree Star)	2010	Epic
"Candyland"	2010	Epic
"I'm What Dreams Are Made Of"	2010	Epic
"Lose Control"	2010	Epic
"You Done Goofed"	2010	Epic
"Party On"	2010	Epic
"Death to Your Heart!"	2010	Epic
"My Gift & My Curse"	2010	All the Rage!!
"P.L.U.R."	2011	All the Rage!!
"G.F.A." (featuring JJ Demon, Nick Nasty and Lady Nogrady)	2011	All the Rage!!
"Bewitched" (featuring Lady Nogrady)	2011	All the Rage!!
"La Petite Morte" (featuring Elena Vladimirova)	2011	—N/a
"Revenge Porn!"	2011	Evolution
"The Right to Love!"	2012	Evolution
"Unforgiven"	2012	Evolution
"Rise & Shine"	2012	Evolution
"Oishi High School Battle Theme Song"	2012	—N/a
"Hell on Heels (Givin' in to Sin)"	2012	The Anthem of the Outcast
"Don't Want to Be Like You"	2012	The Anthem of the Outcast
"I Refuse to Sink (Fuck the Fame)"	2013	Bad Blood
"Something Grimm"	2013	Bad Blood
"Time Machine"	2013	Blood Unplugged
"We're Takin' Over!" (featuring Deuce)	2014	—N/a
"Poison Apple" (featuring Jeffree Star)	2014	Bitchcraft
"Call Me Master"	2014	Bitchcraft
"Freaks Do It Better" (featuring Kerry Louise)	2014	Bitchcraft
"Good Vibes Only"	2014	—N/a
"Filthy Animals"	2015	Cruel Pornography
"Battle Cry!"	2015	Cruel Pornography

== Promotional singles ==
Title	Year	Album
"The Loving Dead"	2010	All the Rage!!
"Yo, Ho"	2010	All the Rage!!
"Happy Violentine's Day"	2011	All the Rage!!
"Crucified By Your Lies"	2013	Bad Blood
"The Sexorcist!"	2015	Cruel Pornography

== Music videos ==
Year	Song	Director
2010	"Death to Your Heart"	Raul Gonzo
2010	"Believe"	Robby Starbuck
2011	"Bewitched"	Patrick Fogharty
2012	"Unforgiven"	Dale Resteghini
2012	"Rise and Shine"	Dale Resteghini
2012	"Don't Want To Be Like You"	Caleb Spillyards, Tyler Forrest
2013	"The Comeback"	Tom JcRonin
2013	"Damaged"	Patrick Fogharty
2014	"The Reckoning"	Dan Centrone
2016	"Zero F*cks Given"	Dahvie Vanity
2017	"Punish Me"	Dahvie Vanity
