= Dahli (entertainer) =

American drag performer and entertainer (born 1991)

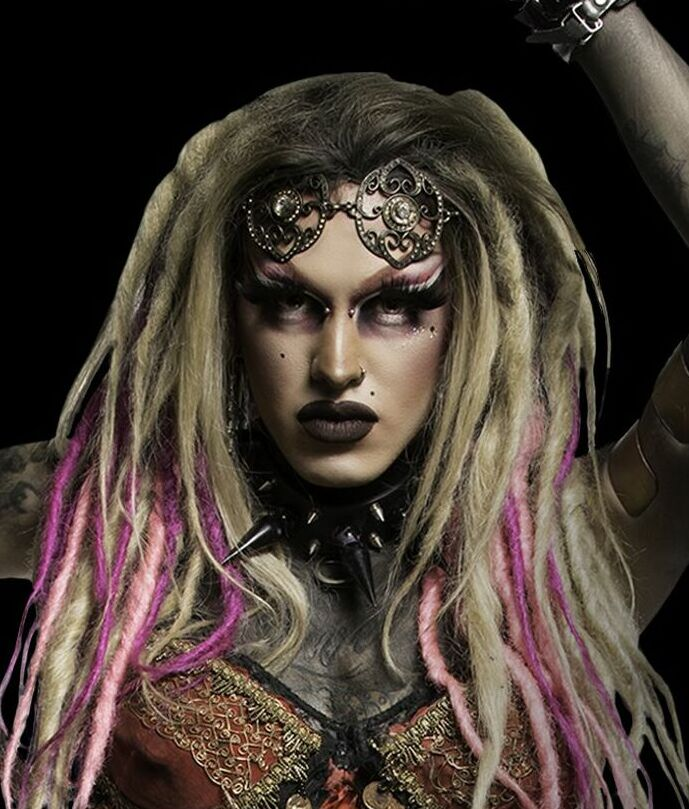
- Dahli in 2017
- Born: Jeremy Brian Griffis; August 1991 (age 34–35); Florida, U.S.
- Other name: Jayy Von Monroe
- Occupations: Musician, drag performer, entertainer
- Television: The Boulet Brothers' Dragula
- Musical career
- Genres: Electronica; electropop; dance-pop; crunkcore
- Occupations: Singer; songwriter
- Instruments: Vocals; guitar; keyboards
- Years active: 2006–2016; 2021; 2022
- Formerly of: Blood on the Dance Floor

Jeremy Brian Griffis, known professionally as Dahli, is an American musician, drag performer, and entertainer who competed on season 2 and season 4 of The Boulet Brothers' Dragula, the latter of which they won and was crowned the "World's Next Drag Supermonster".

Also known as Jayy Von Monroe, Dahli also became known for being a member of the band Blood on the Dance Floor. They left the group in 2016 after allegedly being denied HIV medication from Dahvie Vanity, whom Dahli has described as a sexual predator amid multiple misconduct allegations.

== Early life and career ==
Jeremy Brian Griffis was born in Florida in August 1991. They began attending punk rock shows at the age of 15 and began their professional career under the stage name Jayy Von Monroe.

== Music career ==
In 2009, Blood on the Dance Floor frontman Dahvie Vanity asked Monroe (who had been a fan of the band before joining) to join the group as Garett Ecstasy's replacement, following Ecstasy's departure after the first rape allegation against Vanity. Many of the songs originally recorded with Ecstasy intended for the upcoming album OMFG were re-recorded with new vocals by Monroe. The previous concept of the OMFG album was scrapped, and rebranded as Epic, set for release in 2010. The band went on tour over spring and summer 2010 to promote the release of Epic. With Jeffree Star they recorded three songs for that album. The collaborations with Jeffree Star were short-lived because like former member Garrett Ecstasy, Star had also accused Vanity of being a pedophile and a predator, claiming to have witnessed questionable behavior. Star later chose to go back on his accusations due to feeling like the band was being victimized. He was then featured on their 2014 single "Poison Apple", from the album Bitchcraft. As with the previous conflict with Garrett, the three singles featuring Star's vocals were re-recorded with vocals by Von Monroe, and the original tracks were not featured on the final album.

In October 2010, the album Epic charted No. 5 on the Dance/Electronic Billboard chart. The band headlined the Epic Tour and the Epic Tour Part II in support of the album. Even before the release of Epic, recording began for Blood on the Dance Floor's fourth album, All the Rage!!. The duo collaborated with several artists for the album, including Lady Nogrady, JJ Demon, and Nick Nasty. The album was preceded by several singles to promote the release, including "Yo Ho", and "P.L.U.R.", and "Bewitched", which became the band's most well-known song. The band later embarked on Warped Tour 2011 in June 2011, and released the album while on tour.

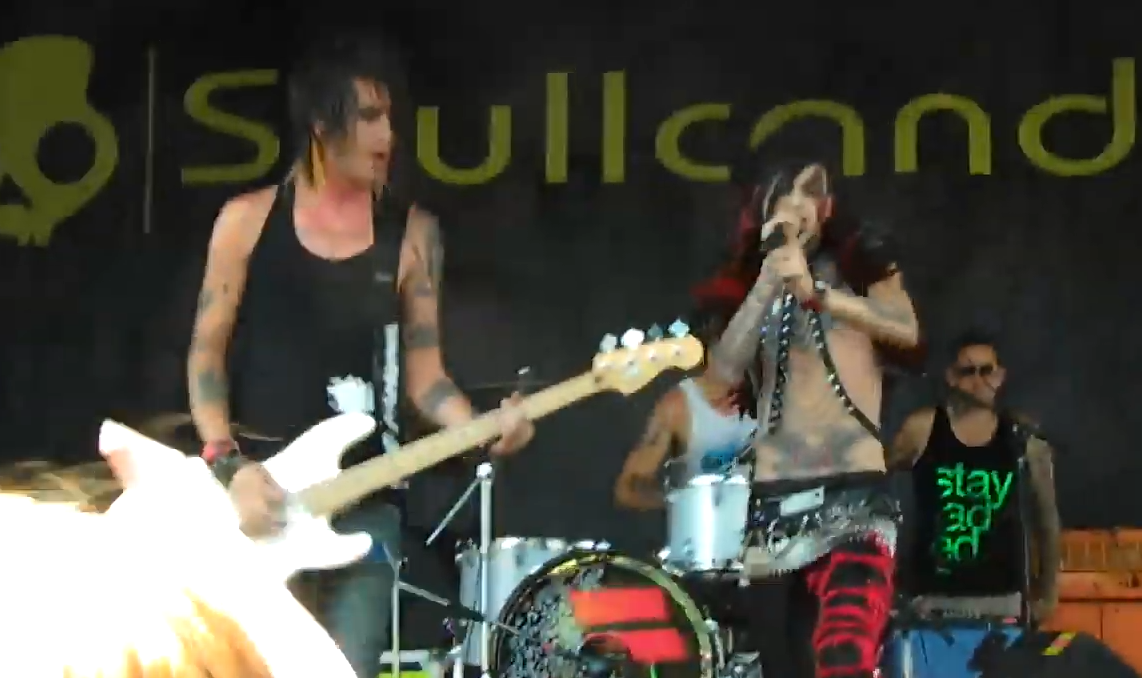
Monroe performing with Blood on the Dance Floor in 2011

The music video for their hit single from the album Bewitched featured Nicole "Lady" Nogrady. She later shared that she felt disrespected by the band throughout the album's production and during the music video shoot. Nogrady revealed that she had to directly confront the band to make sure her name was properly credited for her contributions. The song was subsequently performed by other female vocalists in place of Nogrady at live shows, and was re-recorded with vocals by Haley Rose for their 2013 acoustic album Blood Unplugged. The album peaked at No. 13 on the Billboard Top Electronic Albums chart. At the end of 2011, the duo headlined the All the Rage Tour and was planning the 'Tis the Season to be Killing Tour.

In celebration of Blood on the Dance Floor's fourth anniversary, a digital compilation album titled The Legend of Blood on the Dance Floor was set to be released on Halloween. The compilation's release date was pushed back, originally planned to be released as a CD, it was released as a SoundCloud playlist instead. The compilation features remastered versions of songs from the band's first four albums.

Blood on the Dance Floor's fifth album, Evolution, was released on June 19, 2012, along with a deluxe edition that featured acoustic versions of two songs. Two music videos and four singles were released from the album. The album featured tracks in collaboration with Haley Rose, Amelia Arsenic, Shawn Brandon, Joel Madden of the band Good Charlotte, Elena Vladimirova, and Deuce. As a thank you to their fans they released the three-song free EP Clubbed to Death! on June 20, 2012, for free through an app on Facebook. Their sixth EP, The Anthem of the Outcast, was released on October 30, 2012.

Rumors of a breakup in 2013 were proven to be a hoax with Vanity completely denying that the group was disbanding. Bad Blood was slated for release in September 2013. On February 18, 2013, the lead single "I Refuse to Sink! (Fuck the Fame)" was released, followed by the second single, "Crucified by Your Lies", and a third, "Something Grimm", on July 2, 2013.

Andrew "Drew" Apathy joined in early 2014, and a new album, Bitchcraft, was released in June 2014. Their single "We're Takin over!" featuring Deuce was released February 7. They released the album Scissors in 2016, the band's final release to feature Monroe due to Monroe leaving the group shortly afterward. In 2021 and 2022, Dahli recorded several solo singles.

== Drag career ==
After leaving Blood on the Dance Floor in 2016, they began performing in drag as Dahli. Their stage name was given to them by their "drag mother", Lady O, in homage to Spanish surrealist artist Salvador Dalí. Dahli’s drag aesthetic is often described as a blend of horror, glamour, and punk, frequently featuring intricate makeup and creative concepts.

Dahli gained significant recognition through multiple appearances on the reality competition series The Boulet Brothers' Dragula. They first competed in Season 2 (2017), where they finished in 7th place. In 2020, they returned for the special The Boulet Brothers' Dragula: Resurrection, finishing as a runner-up. This performance led to their casting in Season 4 (2021), where they ultimately won the title of "World’s Next Drag Supermonster". Dahli has since appeared as a guest judge on subsequent seasons, including and Season 5.

== Personal life ==
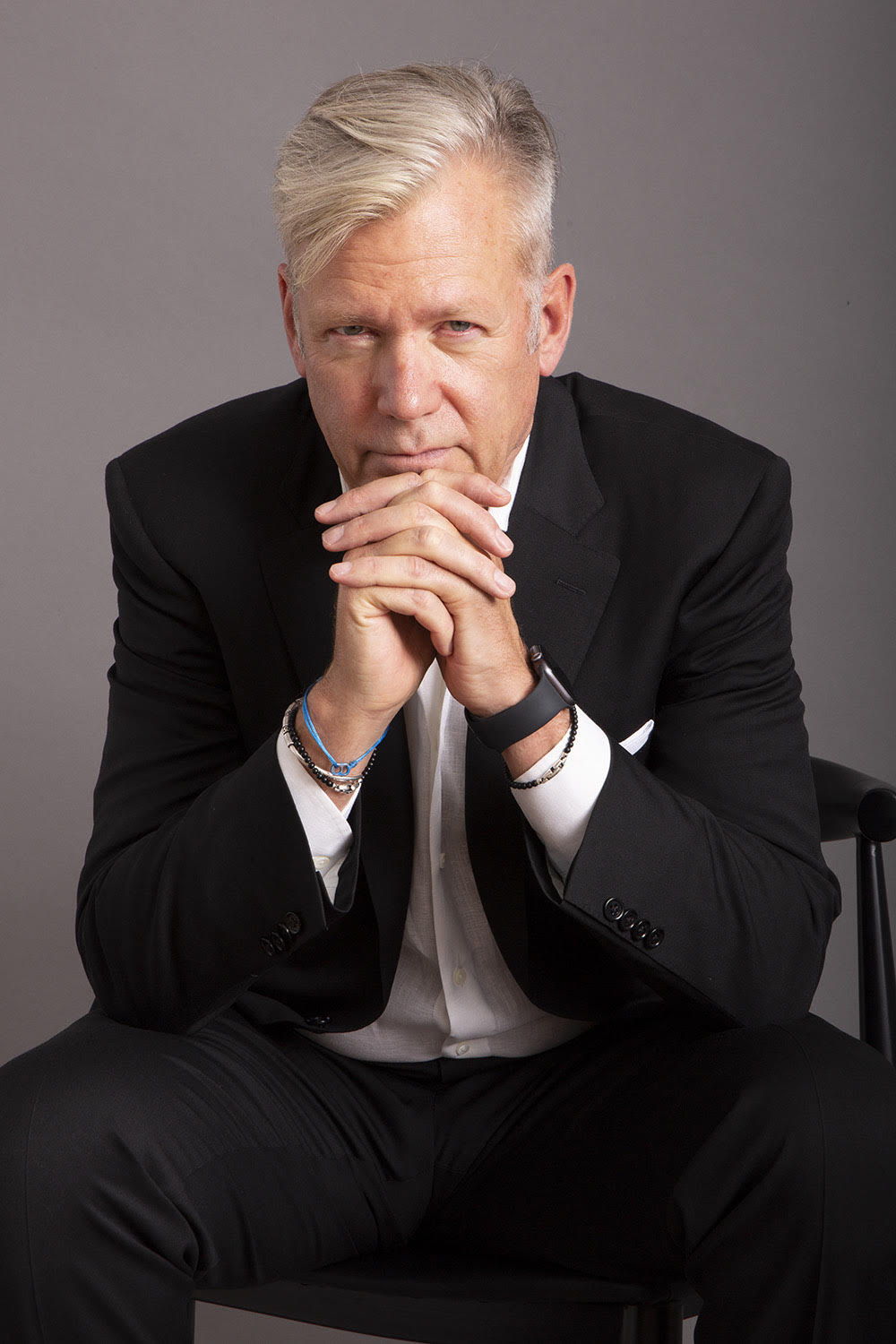
Dahli accused Dahvie Vanity of abuse in an interview with Chris Hansen, who has done multiple other interviews with those, including Damien Leonhardt (formerly known as Jessi Slaughter), who claim Vanity abused or raped them. Dahli has been criticised for their participation in the harassment against Leonhardt at the time.

Dahli is based in the Phoenix, Arizona area. Dahli is non-binary. They are bisexual and were diagnosed with HIV/AIDS while performing with Blood on the Dance Floor, but has since gotten treatment and medication.

In an interview with television journalist Chris Hansen, Dahli accused their former Blood on the Dance Floor bandmate Dahvie Vanity, who has faced multiple allegations of child sexual abuse (including from Damien Leonhardt; formerly known as Jessi Slaughter), of abuse as well, stating that Vanity forced them to tour without their HIV medication which caused them to nearly develop AIDS. Dahli also described Vanity as a sexual predator. Years earlier, Dahli had directly participated in the 2010 cyberbullying of Leonhardt alongside Vanity, initially by releasing a parody of Leonhardt's video with their father, with Dahli in the role of Leonhardt and Vanity in the role of Leonhardt's father. They also released a song, "You Done Goofed", from the album Epic about Leonhardt and Vanity's alleged experiences with them, with mocking lyrics including "We watched as the world watched you cry" and "My name and reputation won't be the target of a slut". Vanity intentionally released the song on Leonhardt's 12th birthday, and it resulted in Leonhardt attempting suicide by overdosing. After public opinion began shifting in Leonhardt's favour after revealing their abuse by Vanity in a 2020 interview with Hansen, Dahli has been criticised for their participation in the harassment against Leonhardt at the time.

== Filmography ==
=== Television ===
Year	Title	Role	Notes
2017	The Boulet Brothers' Dragula (season 2)	Contestant	7th place (5 episodes)
2020	The Boulet Brothers' Dragula: Resurrection	Contestant	Runner-up (1 episode)
2021	The Boulet Brothers' Dragula (season 4)	Contestant	Winner (10 episodes)
2022	The Boulet Brothers' Dragula: Titans	Guest judge	Episode 7
2023	The Boulet Brothers' Dragula (season 5)	Guest judge	Episode 5

== Discography ==
=== Singles ===
==== As lead artist ====
List of singles
Title	Year	Album	Writer(s)	Producer(s)	Ref
"Waiting"	2022	Non-album singles	Jeremy Griffis	No producer credited	
"Stay"	2021	Non-album singles	Jeremy Griffis	Tyla-Joe Connett	
"Halo"	2021	Non-album singles	Jeremy Griffis	Tyla-Joe Connett	
"Cvrsed Images"	2021	Non-album singles	Jeremy Griffis	Tyla-Joe Connett	

=== Studio albums ===
==== With Blood on the Dance Floor ====
- Epic (2010)
- All the Rage!! (2011)
- Evolution (2012)
- The Anthem of the Outcast (2012)
- Bad Blood (2013)
- Blood + Unplugged (2013)
- Bitchcraft (2014)
- Cruel Pornography (2015)
- Scissors (2016)
