= Criticism of Myspace =

The social networking service Myspace was among the most popular web sites in the 2000s decade. It has faced criticism on a variety of fronts, including for a massive redesign of the site in 2012 which occurred after the majority of original users had abandoned the website, misuse of the platform for cyber-bullying and harassment, risks for users' privacy, and major data losses.

== Accessibility and reliability ==
Because most Myspace pages are designed by individuals with little HTML experience, a very large proportion of pages do not satisfy the criteria for valid HTML or CSS laid down by the W3C. Poorly formatted code can cause accessibility problems for those using software such as screen readers. The Myspace home page, as of May 20, 2009, failed HTML validation with around 101 errors (the number changes on sequential validations of the home page due to dynamic content), using the W3C's validator.

Furthermore, Myspace is set up so that anyone can customize the layout and colors of their profile page with virtually no restrictions, provided that the advertisements are not covered up by CSS or using other means. As Myspace users are usually not skilled web developers, this can cause further problems. Poorly constructed Myspace profiles could potentially freeze up web browsers due to malformed CSS coding, or as a result of users placing many high bandwidth objects such as videos, graphics, and Flash in their profiles (sometimes multiple videos and sound files are automatically played at the same time when a profile loads). While Myspace blocks potentially harmful code (such as JavaScript) from profiles, users have occasionally found ways to insert such code. PC World cited this as its main reason for naming Myspace as #1 in its list of twenty-five worst web sites ever.

== Data loss ==
The website has experienced three major data losses: the removal of users' fans in early 2013, the unannounced removal of user blogs and private messages and videos in June 2013, and the loss of all music uploaded before 2016, which occurred in late 2017 or early 2018 and was widely reported in March 2019. More than fifty million music tracks were lost. After users began reporting that music was unplayable, the MySpace developers initially said they were trying to repair the problem, but later acknowledged that it could not be fixed. It was speculated that the data had been deleted deliberately for economic reasons and made to appear accidental.

== Security ==
In October 2005, a flaw in MySpace's site design was exploited by "Samy" to create the first self-propagating cross-site scripting (XSS) worm. MSNBC has reported that "social-networking sites like Myspace are turning out to be hotbeds for spyware," and "infection rates are on the rise, in part thanks to the surging popularity of social-networking sites like MySpace.com." In addition to this, the customization of user pages currently allows the injection of certain HTML which can be crafted to form a phishing user profile, thus keeping the Myspace.com domain as the address. A 2006 study showed that there has been spam on bulletins that has been the result of phishing. Users find their Myspace homepage with bulletins they did not post, realizing later they had been phished. The bulletin consists of an advertisement that provides a link to a fake login screen, tricking people into typing in their Myspace e-mail and password.

Other security fears regarding profile content itself are also present. For example, the embedding of videos inherently allows all of the format's abilities and functions to be used on a page. A prime example of this surfaced in December 2006, when embedded QuickTime videos were found to contain hyperlinks to JavaScript files, which would execute simply when a user visited a 'phished' profile page, or in some cases, by viewing a user's 'about me' elsewhere on the site. Users who entered their login information into a fake login bar that appeared would also be 'phished,' and their accounts would be used to spam other members, thereby spreading the security issue.

Myspace's anti-phishing and anti-spam measures have also come under fire. In 2007 Myspace made changes such that external links on profiles would be redirected through the http://msplinks.com domain. For example, http://en.wikipedia.org would be changed to http://www.msplinks.com/MDFodHRwOi8vZW4ud2lraXBlZGlhLm9yZw==http(The new links are determined by Base64 encoding, as there are ways of decoding the link back into its original URL.) Myspace staffers would be able to disable potentially dangerous links. (The changed links only work if the HTTP referrer is a Myspace page; otherwise, the link will appear to be disabled.) This move has been criticized that it makes profile editing inconvenient and that it does nothing to deter spammers. In February 2008 Myspace changed the system such that users who click such links (except for whitelisted domains like Wikipedia and YouTube) will receive a warning that they will be leaving the Myspace.com domain. As of March 2008, this "feature" has been extended to blogs as well, although previous blog entries are unaffected unless the user updates them.

On January 26, 2008, over 567,000 private Myspace user pictures were downloaded from the site by using a bug published on YouTube and put on the Piratebay torrent site for download.

In 2010, the company was criticized, along with other social networks, for passing user personally identifiable profile information to advertisers when members clicked on ads.

== Privacy settings ==
MySpace has agreed to regular privacy check-ups for the next 20 years due to the fact it "misrepresented" the protection of those using the site and their personal information. The Federal Trade Commission wants to ensure sites truly protect their users and live up to stated standards. MySpace originally promised to not share users "identifiable information, or use such information in a way that was inconsistent with the purpose for which it was submitted, without first giving notice to users and receiving their permission." Despite these promises, MySpace gave advertisers personal information from current users, including: age, gender, profile picture, and username. Consequently, advertisers were able to locate a user's MySpace profile from the Friend ID to gain access to personal information from one's profile, such as the user's full name. This became increasingly dangerous for users and their safety because it leaked private information to the public.

MySpace, in 2010, provided users the option of controlling their individual privacy settings on their profile. In hope of regaining users from Facebook, MySpace is now simplifying their privacy settings. "The change is part of MySpace's new public commitment to privacy." The new privacy settings will allow users to restrict who sees their profile by limiting the accessibility to friends only, or people 18 or older. "Some people may have a private gathering in someone's home - that doesn't mean they're inviting everyone who happens to be friends of friends who are invited," said, Jeremy Mishkin, a partner and Internet privacy expert at the law firm Montgomery McCracken in Philadelphia. Third-party sites gaining access to user's personal private information has been a recurring theme amongst these social networks. Providing a safe social network with proper privacy settings, while also allowing users to be as social as they want, is the ideal system for all social media users.

== Myspace party problems ==
Myspace is often used as a venue for publicizing parties, sometimes with the host's knowledge and sometimes without. There have been some well-publicized incidents where Myspace parties have caused thousands of dollars damage to property, and even (in at least one case) loss of life.

- A party hosted by Corey Worthington, a sixteen-year-old boy from Narre Warren in Melbourne, Australia, and advertised on MySpace, attracted 500 people. Police cars were attacked, and the dog squad and a helicopter were called in. The incident received international coverage. (Worthington subsequently found work as a party promoter, and appeared on the Ten Network's Australian version of Big Brother.) The Sydney Morning Herald's online technology writer, Asher Moses, has noted that MySpace/Facebook parties are particularly prone to gatecrashing because news of events can spread to uninvited guests via "newsfeeds." He suspects some party hosts are oblivious to the actual number of people who get the message.
- In April 2007, a seventeen-year-old British girl hosted a party after distributing information about it on Myspace that was reportedly subtitled "Let's trash the average family-sized house disco party." Her parents were left with an approximately £24,000 ($48,000) bill from police.
- Allen Joplin, a seventeen-year-old American high school student from Seattle, was shot dead at a party that had been publicized through Myspace and attracted uninvited guests. A thirteen-year-old girl was injured in the same shooting.

== Child safety ==
The minimum age to register an account on Myspace was originally 18 before being lowered to 16, 14, and finally 13 over the course of the platform's history. However, sometime around 2023, the minimum age was changed back to 18.

Myspace will delete fake profiles if the victim verifies their identity and points out the profile via e-mail. In July 2007, the company found and deleted 29,000 profiles belonging to registered sex offenders.

Beginning in late June 2006, Myspace users whose ages were set over 18 could no longer be able to add users whose ages were set from 13 to 15 years as friends unless they'd already known the user's full name or email address. Some third-party Internet safety companies such as Social Shield launched online communities for parents concerned about their child's safety on Myspace.

In June 2006, sixteen-year-old American Katherine Lester flew to the Middle East, to Tel Aviv, Israel, after having tricked her parents into getting her a passport in order to be with a twenty-year-old man she met through Myspace. U.S. officials in Jordan persuaded her to turn around and go home.

In October 2006, thirteen-year-old Megan Meier committed suicide after being the victim of cyber-bullying instigated by the mother of a friend who had posed as a sixteen-year-old named "Josh Evans".

In December 2006, Myspace announced new measures to protect children from known sex offenders. Although precise details were not given, they said that "tools" would be implemented to prevent known sex offenders from the USA creating a Myspace profile.

In February 2007, a U.S. District Judge in Texas dismissed a case when a family sued MySpace for negligence, fraud, and misrepresentation; a girl in the family had been sexually assaulted by a man she met through MySpace, after she had misrepresented her age as 18 when she was 13. Regarding his dismissal of the case, U.S. District Judge Sam Sparks wrote: "If anyone had a duty to protect young girls, it was her parents, not MySpace."

In October 2007, a study published in the Journal of Adolescence conducted by Sameer Hinduja (Florida Atlantic University) and Justin W. Patchin (University of Wisconsin-Eau Claire) concluded that most adolescents use Myspace responsibly: "When considered in its proper context, these results indicate that the problem of personal information disclosure on Myspace may not be as widespread as many assume, and that the overwhelming majority of adolescents are responsibly using the website," they say.

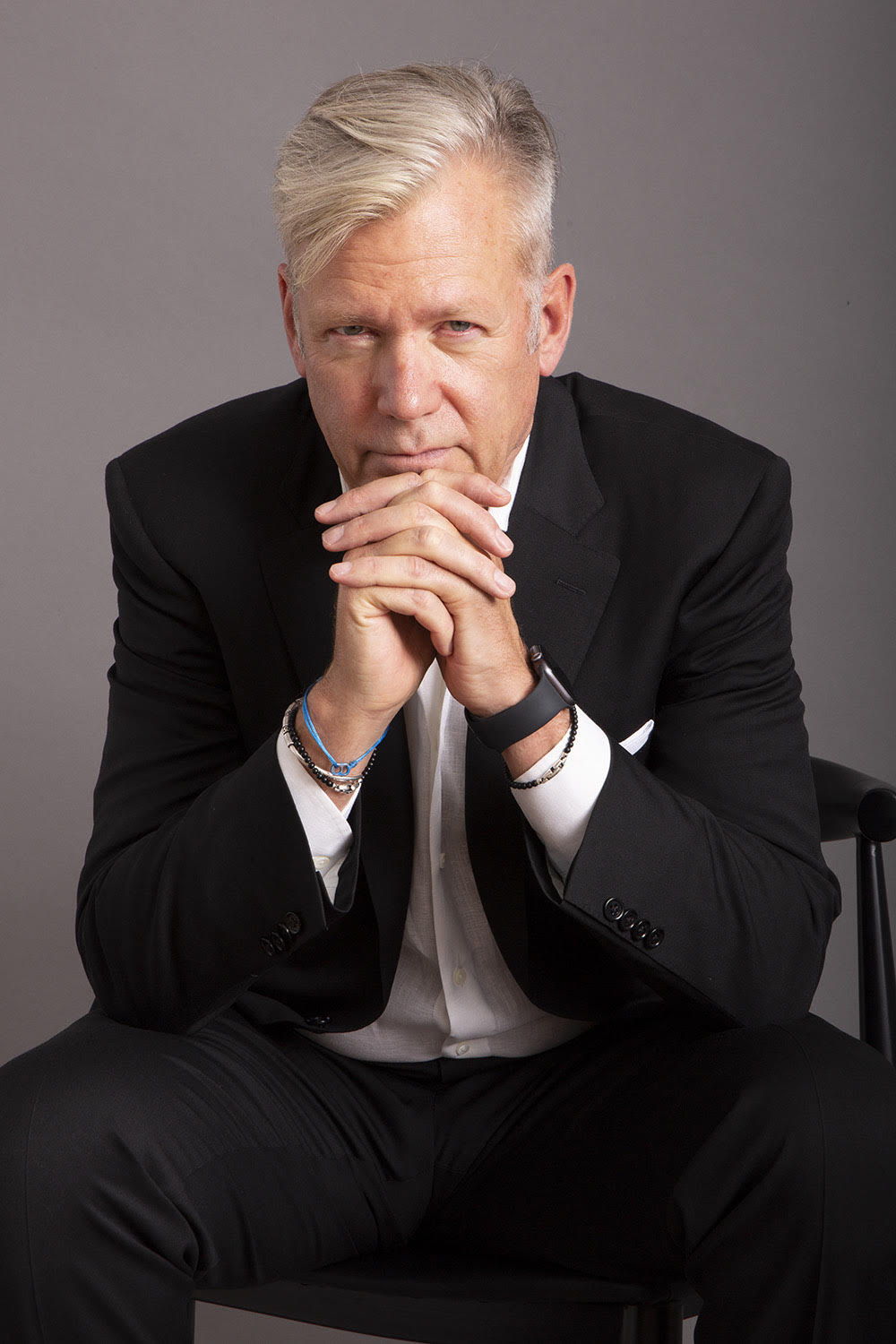
Chris Hansen announced an investigation on Myspace musician and sexual predator Dahvie Vanity in 2020, including having multiple interviews with those, including Damien Leonhardt (formerly known as Jessi Slaughter), who claim Vanity abused or raped them.

In 2009, Damien Leonhart (formerly known as Jessi Slaughter) was groomed and sexually assaulted as a minor by crunkcore musician and sexual predator Dahvie Vanity after meeting him through Myspace, where Vanity was originally known as "The Elite Hair God". Vanity sexually assaulted them for the first time in April 2009, when Leonhardt was 10 and Vanity was 24. Leonhardt said they were at a party at which Vanity was present and while they were in the bathroom of the house, Vanity coerced them to perform oral sex on him. During the next 16 months, Leonhardt stated that Vanity had violently raped them under the guise of BDSM-style sexual activity. In 2010, Leonhardt told a classmate that Vanity had molested them, but later told Insider that they used the term as a joke, and viewed the relationship as consensual. Leonhardt also stated that had they not mentioned Vanity to classmates – which led to the case being discussed online – the abuse would have continued. At the time the site was still popular in 2010, Leonhart was cyberbullied by Vanity's fans at the time and by Vanity himself, but public opinion has since shifted in their favour after they publicly revealed their abuse by Vanity in a 2020 interview with Chris Hansen, and dozens of other former fans of Vanity who were underage at the time revealed their own experiences of sexual misconduct with him between 2006 to 2015, corroborating Leonhart's testimony.

== Social and cultural ==
Dave Itzkoff, in the June 2006 Playboy magazine issue, related his experiences of experimentation with membership in Myspace. Among his other criticisms, one pertains to the distance afforded by the Internet that emboldens members, such as females who feature photos of themselves in scant clothing on their profile pages or behave in ways they would not in person, and he indicated that this duplicity undercuts the central design of MySpace, namely, to bring people together. Itzkoff also referenced the addictive, time-consuming nature of the site, mentioning that the Playboy Playmate and Myspace member Julie McCullough, who was the first to respond to his add-friend request, pointedly referred to the site as "cybercrack". Itzkoff argued that Myspace gives many people access to a member's life, without giving the time needed to maintain such relationships and that such relationships do not possess the depth of in-person relationships.

Furthermore, in terms of MySpace's potential for underhanded commercial exploitation, Itzkoff is particularly critical of the disturbing and fraudulent behavior of people who can contact a member, unsolicited, as when he was contacted by someone expressing a desire to socialize and date, but whose blog (to which Itzkoff was directed via subsequent emails) was found to be a solicitation for a series of commercial porn sites. Itzkoff is similarly critical of the more subtle commercial solicitations on the site, such as the banner ads and links to profiles and video clips that turn out to be, for example, commercials for new 20th Century Fox films. He also observed that MySpace's much-celebrated music section is heavily weighted in favor of record labels rather than breakthrough musicians.

In relating criticism from another person, whom Itzkoff called "Judas", he illustrated that, while the goal of attempting to bring together people who might not otherwise associate with one another in real life may seem honorable, Myspace inherently violates a social contract only present when people interact face-to-face, rendering, in his opinion, the website nothing more than a passing fad:

There will come a moment when, like deer quivering and flicking up their ears toward a noiseless noise in the woods, the first adopters will suddenly realize they’re spending their time blogging, adding, and gawking at the same alarming photos as an army of fourteen year olds, and quick as deer, they’ll dash to the next trend. And before you know it, we’ll all follow.

== Controversy over corporate history ==
After the sale of Myspace to News Corp, Brad Greenspan (the former CEO, founder, and shareholder of Intermix Media the parent company that owned and launched MySpace.com) contested the sale of the company to News Corp. Greenspan claimed that new Intermix Media CEO Richard Rosenblatt and other board members cheated shareholders by selling the company for less than it was actually worth. Valleywag, a gossip blog that reported on the allegations, also claimed that founder and public face of MySpace, Tom Anderson, was a public relations invention. It was later confirmed by Newsweek that Anderson's age on the site had been lowered to "appeal" to younger users.

In October 2006, Greenspan published "The Myspace Report" on a personal website, calling for government investigation into News Corp's acquisition of Myspace. Greenspan's main allegation is that News Corp. should have valued Myspace at US$20 billion rather than US$327 million, and had defrauded Intermix shareholders through an unfair deal process. However the report was not widely accepted by the financial press and a lawsuit led by Greenspan challenging the acquisition was dismissed by a judge.

== Censorship ==
Activist group MoveOn.org has criticized MySpace, claiming that the website practices censorship by not showing anti-media ads, removing fake profiles for high-profile media executives like Rupert Murdoch, and attempting to force users away from using certain third-party Flash applications on their profiles.

== MySpace China ==
The simplified Chinese version of MySpace, launched in April 2007, has many censorship-related differences from other international versions of the service. Discussion forums on topics such as religion and politics are absent, and a filtering system that prevents the posting of content about Taiwan independence, the Dalai Lama, Falun Gong, and other "inappropriate topics" has been added. Users are also given the ability to report the "misconduct" of other users for offenses including "endangering national security, leaking state secrets, subverting the government, undermining national unity, and spreading rumors or disturbing the social order."

== Religious and political discrimination ==
Throughout 2007 and 2008, Myspace was accused of deleting the "Atheist and Agnostic Group" on at least two occasions, deleting a pro-choice group, as well as banning individual Myspace users. The controversy stemmed from the belief that the groups and users had not violated the site's Terms of Service, and had been banned solely due to complaints from a smaller group of conservative religious users who were offended by the groups and members being on Myspace.

== Blocking ==
Schools, public libraries, and employers in the United States, United Kingdom, France, Finland, Sweden, Germany, Russia, Australia and Malaysia have restricted access to Myspace, seeing it as "a haven for gossip and malicious comments."

A Catholic school in New Jersey has prohibited students from using Myspace at home, an action made to protect students from online predators as claimed by the school, although experts questioned the legality of such a ban and if it is constitutional. In autumn of 2005 Pope John XXIII Regional High School in Sparta Township, New Jersey made headlines by forbidding its students to have pages on Myspace or similar websites (such as Gaia) under threat of suspension or expulsion.

In Turkey, Myspace was blocked on September 19, 2009, due to copyright issues of MÜ-YAP. Turkish rock musician Aylin Aslım, who has a Myspace account said the block was a serious violation of rights for independent musicians of Turkey. On October 6 of the same year, the block was lifted.

== Legal issues ==
In May 2006, Long Island, Shaun Harrison and Saverio Mondelli, then eighteen and nineteen years old respectively, were charged with illegal computer access and attempted extortion of MySpace, after both had allegedly hacked into the site to steal the personal information of Myspace users before threatening to share the secrets of how they broke into the website unless Myspace paid them $150,000. They were arrested by undercover Los Angeles police detectives posing as Myspace employees.

In April 2007, police in County Durham, United Kingdom, arrested a 17-year-old girl on charges of criminal damage following a party advertised on MySpace, held at her parents' house without their consent. Over 200 teenagers came to the party from across the country, causing £20,000 of damage, such as cigarette butts, urine on clothing, and writing on the walls. The girl's parents, who were away at the time, had to move out of the house.

== Musicians' rights and Myspace terms of use agreement ==
Until June 2006, there was a concern amongst musicians, artists, and bands on Myspace such as songwriter Billy Bragg owing to the fine print within the user agreement that read, "You hereby grant to MySpace.com a non-exclusive, fully paid and royalty-free, worldwide license (with the right to sublicense through unlimited levels of sublicensees) to use, copy, modify, adapt, translate, publicly perform, publicly display, store, reproduce, transmit, and distribute such Content on and through the Services."

The fine print brought particular concern as the agreement was being made with Murdoch's News Corporation. Billy Bragg brought the issue to the attention of the media during the first week of June 2006. Jeff Berman, a Myspace spokesman swiftly responded by saying, "Because the legalese has caused some confusion, we are at work revising it to make it very clear that Myspace is not seeking a license to do anything with an artist's work other than allow it to be shared in the manner the artist intends."

By June 27, 2006, Myspace had amended the user agreement with, "MySpace.com does not claim any ownership rights in the text, files, images, photos, video, sounds, musical works, works of authorship, or any other materials (collectively, 'Content') that you post to the Myspace Services. After posting your Content to the Myspace Services, you continue to retain all ownership rights in such Content, and you continue to have the right to use your Content in any way you choose."
