= Blood on the Dance Floor (band) =

American crunkcore group

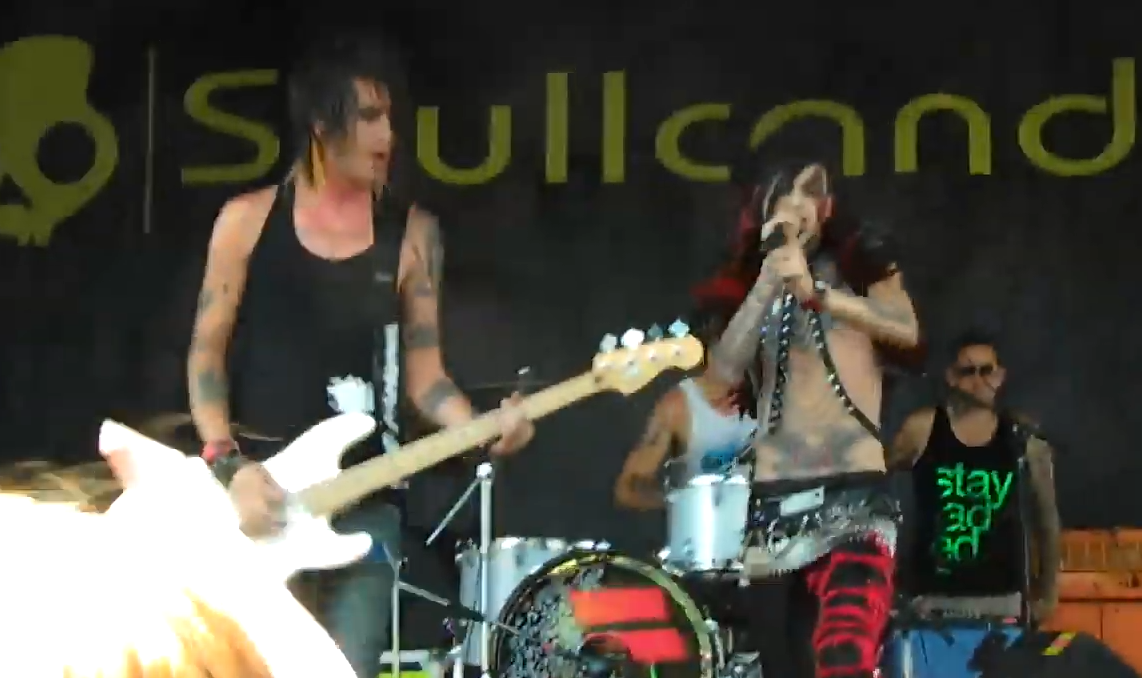
- Blood on the Dance Floor performing in 2011

Background information
- Also known as: BOTDF, Sinners Are Winners, Kawaii Monster, The Most Vivid Nightmares
- Origin: Orlando, Florida, U.S.
- Genres: Electronica; electropop; dance-pop; crunkcore
- Years active: 2006–2016; 2017–2019; 2025–present
- Label: Dark Fantasy
- Members: Dahvie Vanity
- Past members: Matty M; Christopher Mongillo; Rebecca Fugate; Garrett Ecstasy; Nick Nasty; Jayy Von Monroe; Fallon Vendetta

Blood on the Dance Floor is an American electronic and crunkcore group from Orlando, Florida, formed in 2006. The group's longest standing lineup, from 2009 to 2016, consisted of Jesus Torres, also known as Dahvie Vanity, and Jayy Von Monroe. At the peak of their commercial success within the scene subculture, the band released several studio albums, including Evolution (2012), which reached the Billboard 200, and maintained a visible presence in youth culture through merchandise in retailers like Hot Topic and multiple appearances on the Vans Warped Tour, as well as performing the theme song for the Smosh cartoon series Oishi High School Battle.

The group released eleven studio albums before briefly breaking up in 2016 following Von Monroe's departure. It was reformed by Vanity the following year, initially with Fallon Vendetta. After Vendetta's departure, Vanity became the sole member of the group. Since 2019, Vanity has performed under the name Kawaii Monster and most recently The Most Vivid Nightmares.

Since 2009, at least 21 women have made sexual assault, child sexual abuse, and rape allegations against Vanity, with one leading to his arrest in 2009. A central figure in these allegations is Damien Leonhardt (formerly known as Jessi Slaughter), who became a viral meme and cyberbullying victim in 2010. Years later, Leonhardt publicly alleged that the rumors sparking the original harassment were true, stating that Vanity began grooming and sexually abusing them in 2009 when they were only 10 years old. Those allegations, along with dozens of others, led to significant professional repercussions, including the removal of Blood on the Dance Floor's music from major streaming platforms like Spotify and Google Play for violating content guidelines. Former bandmates Garrett Ecstasy and Jayy Von Monroe have described Vanity as a sexual predator, and Monroe accused Vanity of abuse as well. Jeffree Star and New Years Day members Ash Costello and Nikki Misery have stated that they observed Vanity engage in questionable or illegal sexual behavior. Many of the accusers were underage during the alleged attacks.

== History ==
=== Career ===
Co-founder Dahvie Vanity (pictured) is the band's only constant member.

After falling out as a touring musician with multiple local musical acts in the Orlando, Florida area during 2006, Jesus Torres, going by the moniker "Dahvie Vanity" ("Dahvie the Elite Hair God" on Myspace), formed a musical group with friends Matty "M" Malaret, Christopher Mongillo, and Rebecca Fugate. Initially the group (then titled "Love the Fashion") was considered a joke, but developed into Blood on the Dance Floor in the summer of 2007. Malaret left the group in late 2007 before the group's self-released debut album, Let's Start a Riot, in April 2008. Citing the inability to tour, Mongillo and Fugate also left the band shortly thereafter.

During the recording of their second album, It's Hard to Be a Diamond in a Rhinestone World, the band was picked up by producer and writer Rusty Wilmot. During the recording of this album, Garrett Marshal McLaughlin (Garrett Ecstasy) was recruited to do backup vocals and screaming. The CD was self-released in October 2008. Only 300 copies were made.

Vanity and Ecstasy recorded the singles "Siq with a Q" and "Suicide Club" as a duo in 2008, and released three extended plays over the first half of 2009, I Scream I Scream, OMFG Sneak Peak, and Extended Play. The duo embarked on the OMFG Tour with other local bands Electric Valentine, Weston Buck, The Greenlight District, and The Crush in promotion of their upcoming album then titled OMFG.

After Ecstasy's departure from the band in light of rape allegations against Vanity, Vanity asked Jayy Von Monroe (who had been a fan of the band before joining) to join the group as Ecstasy's replacement. Many of the songs originally recorded with Ecstasy intended for the upcoming album OMFG were re-recorded with new vocals by Von Monroe. The previous concept of the OMFG album was scrapped, and rebranded as Epic, set for release in 2010. The band went on tour over spring and summer 2010 to promote the release of Epic. With Jeffree Star they recorded three songs for that album. The collaborations with Jeffree Star were short-lived because like former member Garrett Ecstasy, Star had also accused Vanity of being a pedophile and a predator, claiming to have witnessed questionable behavior. Star later chose to go back on his accusations due to feeling like the band was being victimized. He was then featured on their 2014 single "Poison Apple", from the album Bitchcraft. As with the previous conflict with Garrett, the three singles featuring Star's vocals were re-recorded with vocals by Von Monroe, and the original tracks were not featured on the final album.

In October 2010, the album Epic charted No. 5 on the Dance/Electronic Billboard chart. The band headlined the Epic Tour and the Epic Tour Part II in support of the album.

Even before the release of Epic, recording began for Blood on the Dance Floor's fourth album, All the Rage!!. The duo collaborated with several artists for the album, including Lady Nogrady, JJ Demon, and Nick Nasty. The album was preceded by several singles to promote the release, including "Yo Ho", and "P.L.U.R.", and "Bewitched", which became the band's most well-known song. The band later embarked on Warped Tour 2011 in June 2011, and released the album while on tour.

The music video for their hit single from the album Bewitched featured Nicole "Lady" Nogrady. She later shared that she felt disrespected by the band throughout the album's production and during the music video shoot. Nogrady revealed that she had to directly confront the band to make sure her name was properly credited for her contributions. The song was subsequently performed by other female vocalists in place of Nogrady at live shows, and was re-recorded with vocals by Haley Rose for their 2013 acoustic album Blood Unplugged.

The album peaked at No. 13 on the Billboard Top Electronic Albums chart. At the end of 2011, the duo headlined the All the Rage Tour and was planning the 'Tis the Season to be Killing Tour.

In celebration of Blood on the Dance Floor's fourth anniversary, a digital compilation album titled The Legend of Blood on the Dance Floor was set to be released on Halloween. The compilation's release date was pushed back, originally planned to be released as a CD, it was released as a SoundCloud playlist instead. The compilation features remastered versions of songs from the band's first four albums.

In 2012, Vanity as Blood on the Dance Floor performed the theme song for the Oishi High School Battle series on the Shut Up! Cartoons channel created by Anthony Padilla and Ian Hecox of Smosh, and made a cameo appearance in the series as himself in the intro sequence, alongside Monroe. The series' theme song was a customized version of the band's typical crunkcore style and was heavily featured in every episode of the first three seasons. Following the public exposure of Vanity as a child sexual predator and further sexual assault allegations, all episodes of Oishi High School Battle were eventually removed by Smosh from the Shut Up! Cartoons channel.

Blood on the Dance Floor's fifth album, Evolution, was released on June 19, 2012, along with a deluxe edition that featured acoustic versions of two songs. Two music videos and four singles were released from the album.

The album featured tracks in collaboration with Haley Rose, Amelia Arsenic, Shawn Brandon, Joel Madden of the band Good Charlotte, Elena Vladimirova, and Deuce.

As a thank you to their fans they released the three-song free EP Clubbed to Death! on June 20, 2012, for free through an app on Facebook. Their sixth EP, The Anthem of the Outcast, was released on October 30, 2012.

Rumors of a breakup in 2013 were proven to be a hoax with Vanity completely denying that the group was disbanding. Bad Blood was slated for release in September 2013. On February 18, 2013, the lead single "I Refuse to Sink! (Fuck the Fame)" was released, followed by the second single, "Crucified by Your Lies", and a third, "Something Grimm", on July 2, 2013.

Andrew "Drew" Apathy joined in early 2014, and a new album, Bitchcraft, was released in June 2014. Their single "We're Takin over!" featuring Deuce was released February 7. They released the album Scissors in 2016, the band's final release to feature Jayy Von Monroe due to Von Monroe leaving the group shortly afterward.

After Vonn Monroe's departure from the band, Vanity established multiple new solo music projects such as Sinners Are Winners and Master of Death.

In April 2017, Vanity announced that there would be a new member, and that Blood on the Dance Floor would be returning on May 5 of that year without Von Monroe. In May 2017, it was revealed that Dahvie's girlfriend, Fallon Vendetta, had temporarily joined Blood on the Dance Floor. With Vendetta, they released the singles "Resurrection Spell", "Love Like Voodoo", "Six Feet Under", "Yo Ho 2 (Pirate's Life)", "Ghosting" and "Destroy". Their album Kawaii Monster was released on October 31, 2017. Kawaii Monster pre-orders included a second disc, a remastered edition of Let's Start a Riot. The band also released an exclusive EP, You Are the Heart. In 2018, they released Haunted, followed by Cinema Erotica and You Are the Heart. Vendetta departed the group shortly afterward following a breakup with Vanity, leaving him the sole remaining member of the group.

On September 5, 2019, Vanity released a solo album as Blood on the Dance Floor titled Hollywood Death Star featuring singles such as "Sweet Like Popsicles" and "Sex Rx". After this album, Vanity seemingly retired the Blood on the Dance Floor moniker to focus on his alternate music projects such as Kawaii Monster and The Most Vivid Nightmares as well as his "Dark Arts Official" merchline.

On January 1, 2021, Vanity released a new version of Blood on the Dance Floor's "Bewitched" as "Bewitched Reimagined" featuring singer Sammy Beare. As of 2016, Monroe has continued to work as a drag queen under the name "The Dahli" and Vanity has continued to release music and merchandise by himself under both "The Most Vivid Nightmares" and "Dark Arts Official".

Although the band had been inactive since the breakup with Fallon Vendetta in 2019 and multiple rape allegations against Vanity between 2020 and 2021, in Spring 2025 Vanity teased an upcoming final Blood on the Dance Floor record on his "Dark Arts Official" Instagram page, with two singles being released on June 13, 2025. The complete album (somewhat of a sequel to Epic), titled Epidemic, was released on October 31, 2025. This was later revealed to be a marketing stunt, and Vanity would go back on claims that this is their final album, with a new record planned for 2026, titled Ripe With Decay.

=== Vanity sexual misconduct cases ===
Since 2009, at least 21 women have made sexual assault, child sexual abuse, and rape allegations against Vanity, with one leading to his arrest in 2009. Former bandmates Garrett Ecstasy, who left the band in 2009, and Jayy Von Monroe, who left in 2016, have described Vanity as a sexual predator. A central figure in these allegations is Damien Leonhardt (formerly known as Jessi Slaughter), who became a viral meme in 2010 after their father's "you done goofed" video went viral. Vanity and Moore directly participated in the taunting of Leonhardt, initially by releasing a parody of Leonhardt's video, with Moore in the role of Leonhardt and Vanity in the role of Leonhardt's father. They also released a song, "You Done Goofed", from the album Epic about Leonhardt and Vanity's alleged experiences with them, with mocking lyrics including "We watched as the world watched you cry" and "My name and reputation won't be the target of a slut". Vanity intentionally released the song on Leonhardt's 12th birthday, and it resulted in Leonhardt attempting suicide by overdosing.

Years later, Leonhardt publicly alleged that the rumors sparking the original harassment were true, stating that Vanity began grooming and sexually abusing them in 2009 when they were only 10 years old. These claims, along with dozens of others, led to investigative reports by outlets such as HuffPost and MetalSucks. In an interview with television journalist Chris Hansen, who also interviewed Leonhardt and several of Vanity's other accusers, Monroe accused Vanity of abuse as well, stating that Vanity forced him to tour without his HIV medication which caused him to nearly develop AIDS. Von Monroe also stated that he later made a full recovery after leaving the band in 2016. Jeffree Star and New Years Day members Ash Costello and Nikki Misery have stated that they observed Vanity engage in questionable or illegal sexual behavior during one of the Vans Warped Tours and also during the "All the Rage Tour 2012" in support of their fourth studio album of the same name around the early 2010s. Many of the accusers were underage during the alleged attacks.

In response to the allegations, Combichrist removed Blood on the Dance Floor from their tour in 2014. Merchandising website Big Cartel removed the band's products in 2018 in response to the allegations, while Spotify and Google Play removed the band's music in April 2019 for violating their guidelines regarding prohibited content.

In early 2020, Hansen announced an investigation on Vanity, including having multiple interviews with those who claim Vanity abused or raped them. At the time, the FBI confirmed that they were also investigating the allegations against Vanity. As of 2025, no criminal charges have been brought against Vanity. He has responded to the accusations on multiple occasions, usually with denial, threats or evasion.

== Musical style and influences ==
The group's style has been described as having sexually explicit lyrics combined with electronica or electronic music, but also heavily incorporates electropop, dance-pop, and crunkcore.

Vanity stated in an interview that Jeffree Star is a huge influence on Blood on the Dance Floor. Vanity also stated that he was inspired by Marilyn Manson.

== Members ==
Current line-up

- Dahvie Vanity – lead vocals, guitar, keyboards, programming (2006–2016, 2017–2019, 2025-present)

Former members

- Matty M – backing vocals, drums (2007)
- Christopher Mongillo – backing vocals, programming, guitar (2007–2008)
- Rebecca Fugate – keyboards, backing vocals, backing vocals (2007–2008)
- Garrett Ecstasy – backing vocals, occasional lead vocals (2008–2009)
- Nick Nasty – vocals (2009)
- Jayy Von Monroe – lead vocals (2009–2016)
- Fallon Vendetta – lead vocals (2017–2018)

Touring musicians

- Brandy Wynn – violin (2012–2013)
- Haley Rose – vocals (2012–2013)
- Carter Harris – keyboards (2011–2012)
- Johnny Awford – bass, drums (2011)
- Nick Nasty – drums, vocals (2010–2011)
- Rusty Wilmot – guitar, bass keyboards, drums (2009–2011)
- Alex Gilbertson – bass (2011)
- Brian Carpenter – drums (2012)

Timeline

== Discography ==
=== Studio albums ===
- Let's Start a Riot (2008)
- It's Hard to Be a Diamond in a Rhinestone World (2008)
- Epic (2010)
- All the Rage!! (2011)
- Evolution (2012)
- The Anthem of the Outcast (2012)
- Bad Blood (2013)
- Blood + Unplugged (2013)
- Bitchcraft (2014)
- Cruel Pornography (2015)
- Scissors (2016)
- Kawaii Monster (2017)
- Haunted (2018)
- Cinema Erotica (2018)
- You Are The Heart (2018)
- Hollywood Death Star (2019)
- OMFG (2023)
- Epidemic (2025)
- Ripe With Decay (2026)

== See also ==
- Lostprophets
