= Parry Aftab =

American lawyer

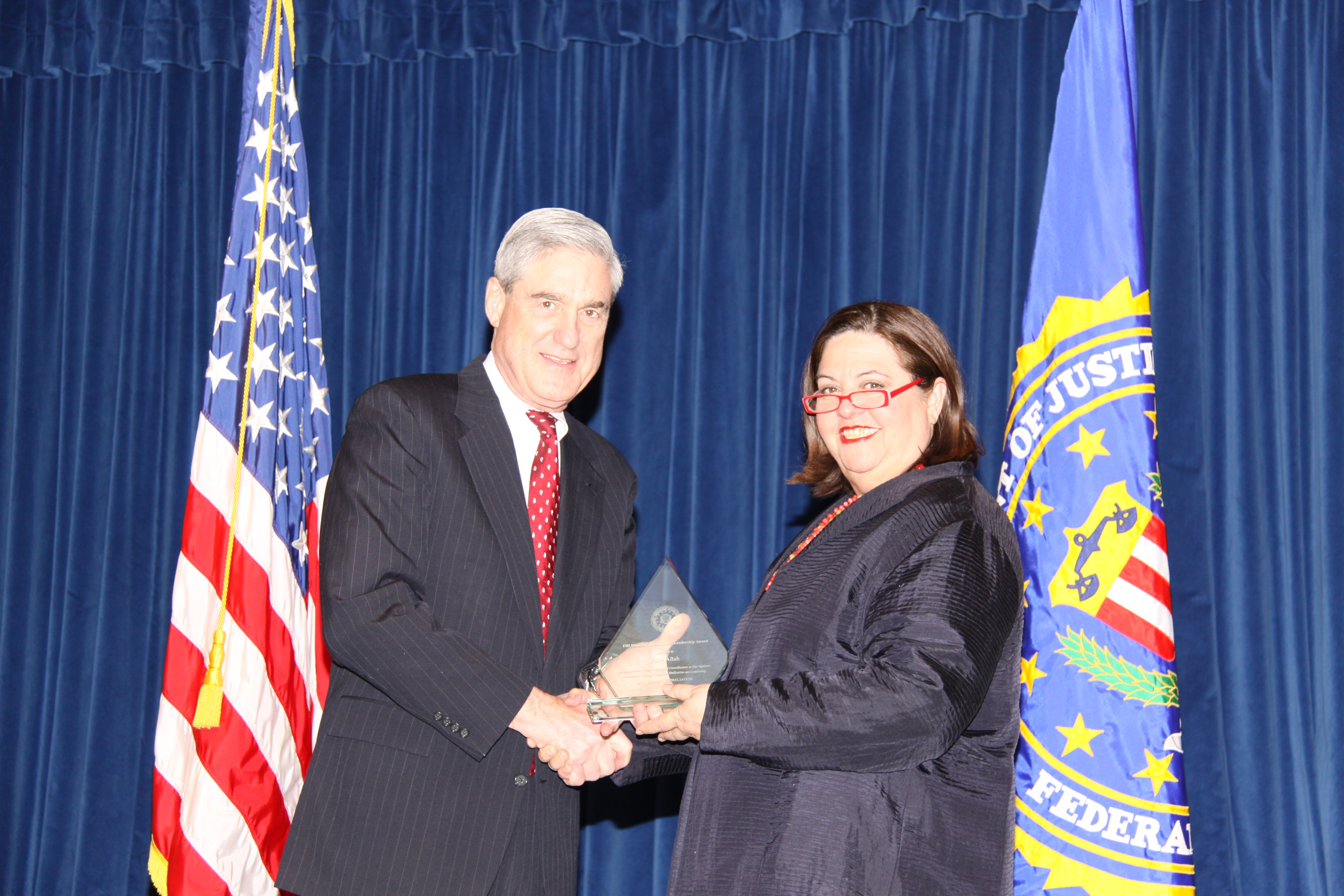
- Aftab accepting an award from FBI Director Robert Mueller in 2010
- Citizenship: US
- Education: Hunter College (BS); New York University School of Law (JD)
- Occupations: Lawyer, author, charity head, board member, speaker, consultant
- Writing career
- Language: English, Spanish and some Russian
- Notable works: The Parent's Guide to the Internet, StopCyberbullying Global, A Parent's Guide to Protecting Your Children in Cyberspace
- Website: aftab.com

Parry Aftab is an Internet privacy and security lawyer. She is the founder of the Internet safety organization WiredSafety, StopCyberbullying and the consulting firm, WiredTrust.

== Career ==
Aftab was appointed by UNESCO's Director General Federico Mayor as the chief of the U.S. National Action Committee for UNESCO's World Citizen's Committee on Protecting Innocence in Danger group in 1999 to address online sexual exploitation of children. She became a member of the Board of Directors for the non-profit, TRUSTe in 2003. In 2005, the United States Congress issued a resolution that recognized her efforts to combat cyberbullying as Executive Director of StopCyberbullying and WiredSafety.

Aftab was "the Privacy Lawyer" columnist for Information Week magazine for many years.

Her organization, WiredSafety, became a member of Facebook's Safety Advisory Board in 2009 and in April, Aftab appeared on Good Morning America for its town hall meeting on sexting. In 2010 she received the FBI Director's Community Leadership Award and was one of 28 members in the Online Safety and Technology Working Group of the National Telecommunications and Information Administration. She was one of 29 members of the Internet Safety Technical Task Force, run by Harvard's Berkman Center.

Amid the Jessi Slaughter sexual abuse and cyberbullying case in 2010, after the Good Morning America interview, the television audience was advised on how to handle cyberbullying (online bullying and harassment) from Aftab. She was subsequently subjected to harassment attributed to 4chan users in the forms of Google bombing false accusations of child sexual assault, the distribution of personal information, threatening telephone calls, and DoS attacks against her websites wiredsafety.org and aftab.com. Aftab canceled a follow-up GMA report due to air the next day because of the harassment.

In July 2011, Aftab was the victim of a swatting incident at her home when the police were contacted with claims that her house was the site of murders and hostages. Aftab was on vacation at the time and a local police swat team investigated the false claims.

She was the co-recipient of the RCMP's Child Recovery Award in 2011. Aftab was the organizer for a 2015 anti-cyberbullying event in Ireland, and has been a member of the advisory boards for MTV's A Thin Line, Fair Play, Sesame Street Online and the Ad Council. Her clients have included Facebook, Disney and Nickelodeon.

In 2016 Parry Aftab founded Cybersafety India and the StopCyberbullying and sextortion and morphing prevention initiatives for India. She resides in both the US and Canada.

== Personal Life ==
In 2024 Aftab moved to Prince Edward Island, where she writes a column in The Eastern Graphic called "PEI Cooks".

== Publications ==
- Child Abuse on the Internet. Ending the Silence, Carlos A. Arnaldo, Ed., Chapter 21: "The Technical Response: Blocking, Filtering and Rating the Internet", pp. 135–140 (2001) ISBN 92-3-103728-5 ISBN 978-9231037283
- Inocencia en Peligro : Conviva con sus Hijos y Protéjalos Cuando Naveguen por Internet (2001) ISBN 970-10-3297-7 ISBN 978-9701032978
- The Parent's Guide to Protecting Your Children in Cyberspace (1999) ISBN 0-07-135752-1 ISBN 978-0071357524
- Parents Guide to the Internet: And How to Protect Your Children in Cyberspace (1997) ISBN 0-9660491-0-1 ISBN 978-0966049107
- Parent's Guide to the Internet - UK edition (2000) ISBN 0077096746 ISBN 978-0077096748
- Ciberbullying, Guia Practica - Spain/Espana (2004) ISBN 84-9726-336-7
- INTERNET con los menores riesgos. Guía práctica para madres y padres - Spain/Espana (2003) ISBN 84-9726-310-3
