= Jessi Slaughter sexual abuse and cyberbullying case =

Sexual abuse and cyberbullying case from 2010

Blood on the Dance Floor's lead singer, Dahvie Vanity, has faced child sexual abuse allegations from Leonhardt and multiple other underage former fans.

The Jessi Slaughter sexual abuse and cyberbullying case was an American criminal case that revolved around the 11-year-old Dami Slaughter (born Jessica Leonhardt, known online at the time as "Jessi Slaughter" and "Kerligirl13"), whose profanity-laden videos went viral on Instagram and YouTube and resulted in telephone and internet harassment in 2010. It is the central part of the wider sexual abuse allegations against the lead singer of the band Blood on the Dance Floor, Dahvie Vanity (real name Jesus Torres). Vanity directly participated in the harassment against Slaughter in 2010 through a mocking song.

Slaughter's 2010 videos were made in response to accusations that a friend had raped Slaughter, and that Slaughter had a sexual relationship with Vanity while Slaughter was a minor. Years later, Slaughter publicly alleged that the rumors sparking the original harassment were true, stating that Vanity began grooming and sexually abusing him (Note: According to his social media profiles, Slaughter uses the pronouns he/him and they/them. This article uses he/him for consistency.) in 2009 when he was only 10 years old. His videos resulted at the time in a campaign of telephone and internet harassment against Slaughter and his family, which was attributed to 4chan and anonymous cyberbullies. Slaughter's father's reaction made the taunting worse, and the video of his reactions received more views than any of Slaughter's previous recordings, with several quotes from his speech becoming memes themselves. The mocking song "You Done Goofed" from the Blood on the Dance Floor album Epic is about Slaughter and Vanity's alleged experiences with him. The case began a debate about the dangers of anonymity on the Internet, and whether or not the Internet is a safe environment for minors, and all people in general. Slaughter told The Independent in 2016: "I wouldn't even call what happened to me cyberbullying, it was straight up harassment and stalking. It started out as cyberbullying but it quickly evolved." Slaughter later came out as transgender and non-binary, using the name Damien Leonhardt while using he/they pronouns. Slaughter now uses the names Dami, Damien, and D, with the surname Slaughter.

The case later became the central part of the sexual misconduct allegations against Vanity, which began in 2009. In 2018, Slaughter accused Vanity of child sexual abuse and rape in a post on the social media site Tumblr during their alleged relationship, when Slaughter was 10 years old. In 2019, 21 women accused Vanity of sexual assault, child sexual abuse, and rape, with many of them saying the attacks took place while they were under the age of consent. In 2020, Slaughter told journalist Chris Hansen of To Catch a Predator that Vanity sexually assaulted him in April 2009, when Slaughter was 10 and Vanity was 24. He was interviewed as part of Hansen's YouTube channel Have a Seat with Chris Hansen; Hansen described Slaughter as Vanity's "victim zero". In early 2020, Hansen announced an investigation on Vanity, including having multiple interviews with those who claim Vanity abused or raped them. At the time, the FBI confirmed that they were also investigating the allegations against Vanity. As of 2026, no criminal charges have been brought against Vanity.

== Videos ==
Slaughter began making YouTube videos when he was 10 years old, discussing "fashion, clothes and local drama that was happening within the party scene" which were uploaded on his friend's webcam. Slaughter posted his first popular video just before his twelfth birthday in response to two claims made on StickyDrama and MySpace: the first being that he was a victim of rape, and the second being that he was coerced into a sexual relationship with the lead singer of the electronic crunkcore band Blood on the Dance Floor, a man by the name of Dahvie Vanity (real name Jesus Torres). Years later, Slaughter publicly alleged that the rumors sparking the original harassment were true, stating that Vanity began grooming and sexually abusing him in 2009 when he was only 10 years old. The video was eventually linked to by users of 4chan, who then found and distributed Slaughter's legal name, phone number, and address. Slaughter also responded to comments that his relationship with Vanity constituted statutory rape with anger.

The harassment intensified after Slaughter uploaded a video that included his father, Gene Leonhardt, insulting and threatening the 4chan users that had posted information about Slaughter, telling them they had "done goofed", and that:

You know what? I'm gonna tell you right now. This is from her father, you bunch of lying no-good punks. And I know who it's coming from, because I back-traced it. And I know who's emailing and who's doing it, and you've been reported to the cyber-police and the state police. You better— Write one more thing, or screw with my computer again, you'll be arrested. End of conversation, from her father. And if you come near my daughter, guess what? Consequences will never be the same. You lying bunch of pricks.

The video, which was titled "You Dun Goofed Up", received over 1 million views on YouTube in one week. Slaughter's father's reaction made the taunting worse, and the video of his reactions received more views than any of Leonhardt's previous recordings, with several quotes from his speech becoming memes themselves.

Vanity and his then-Blood on the Dance Floor bandmate Jayy Von Moore directly participated in the taunting of Slaughter, initially by releasing a parody of Slaughter's video, with Moore in the role of Slaughter and Vanity in the role of Slaughter's father. They also released a song, "You Done Goofed", from the album Epic about Slaughter and Vanity's alleged experiences with him, with mocking lyrics including "We watched as the world watched you cry" and "My name and reputation won't be the target of a slut". Vanity intentionally released the song on Slaughter's 12th birthday, and it resulted in Slaughter attempting suicide by overdosing.

Gene was later arrested in March 2011 for abusing Slaughter in an argument when he punched him, causing him to have bloody and swollen lips, according to a police report. Gene later died from a heart attack while in custody at a police station in early 2011. Slaughter stated that he had lost all of his friends as a result of the harassment. Because of the harassment, Slaughter was placed under police protection, and the family's home was under police surveillance. Slaughter underwent counseling for harassment. In a subsequent Good Morning America interview, the family revealed that they had received harassment, including death threats. In retaliation for Gawker's coverage of the case, Gawker experienced a series of DoS attacks attributed to 4chan users.

=== Parry Aftab harassment ===
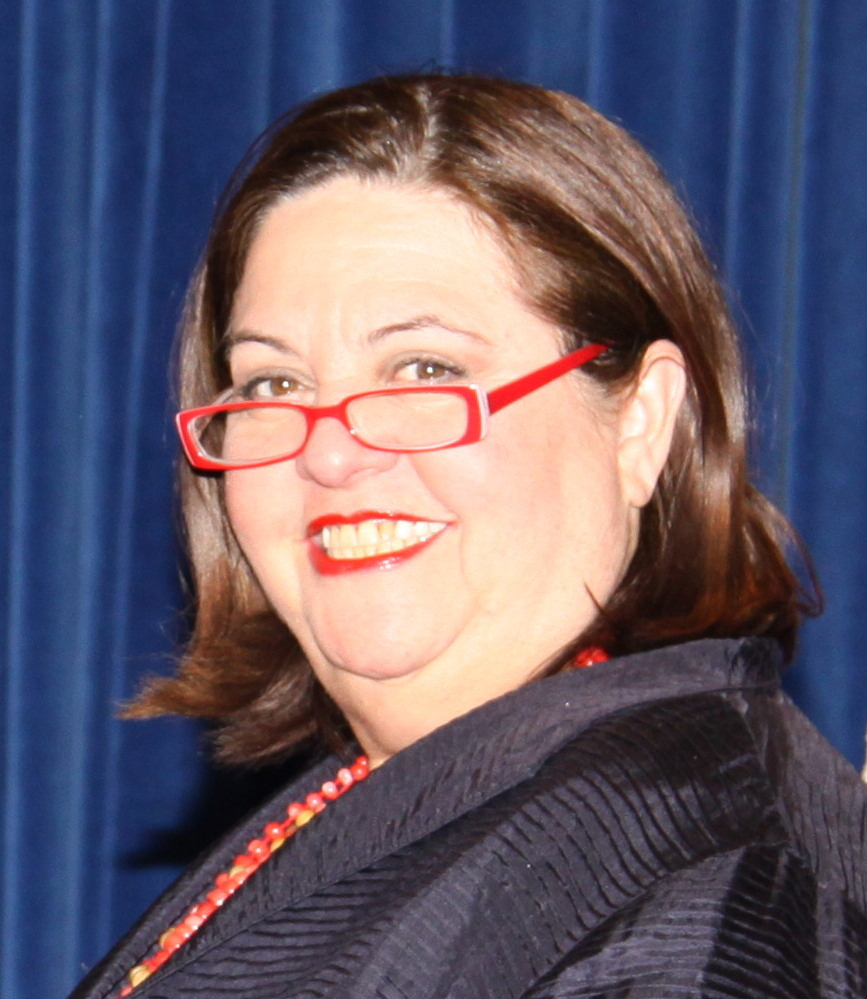
Parry Aftab was subjected to harassment attributed to 4chan users

After the Good Morning America interview, the television audience was advised on how to handle cyberbullying (online bullying and harassment) from internet privacy expert Parry Aftab. Aftab was subsequently subjected to harassment attributed to 4chan users in the forms of Google bombing false accusations of child sexual assault, the distribution of personal information, threatening telephone calls, and DoS attacks against her websites wiredsafety.org and aftab.com. Aftab canceled a follow-up GMA report due to air the next day because of the harassment.

=== Reactions ===
In Australia, advocates of internet censorship invoked the harassment to support mandatory content filtering. In France, L'Express described the harassment as "ruining the life" of "an American in the midst of an adolescent crisis", and France 24 noted that some were using the controversy to claim that 4chan should be censored.

The case was seen by BuzzFeed News in 2018 as an example of how attitudes to cyberbullying have changed since 2010, with more emphasis on the victim of abuse.

== Sexual abuse by Dahvie Vanity ==
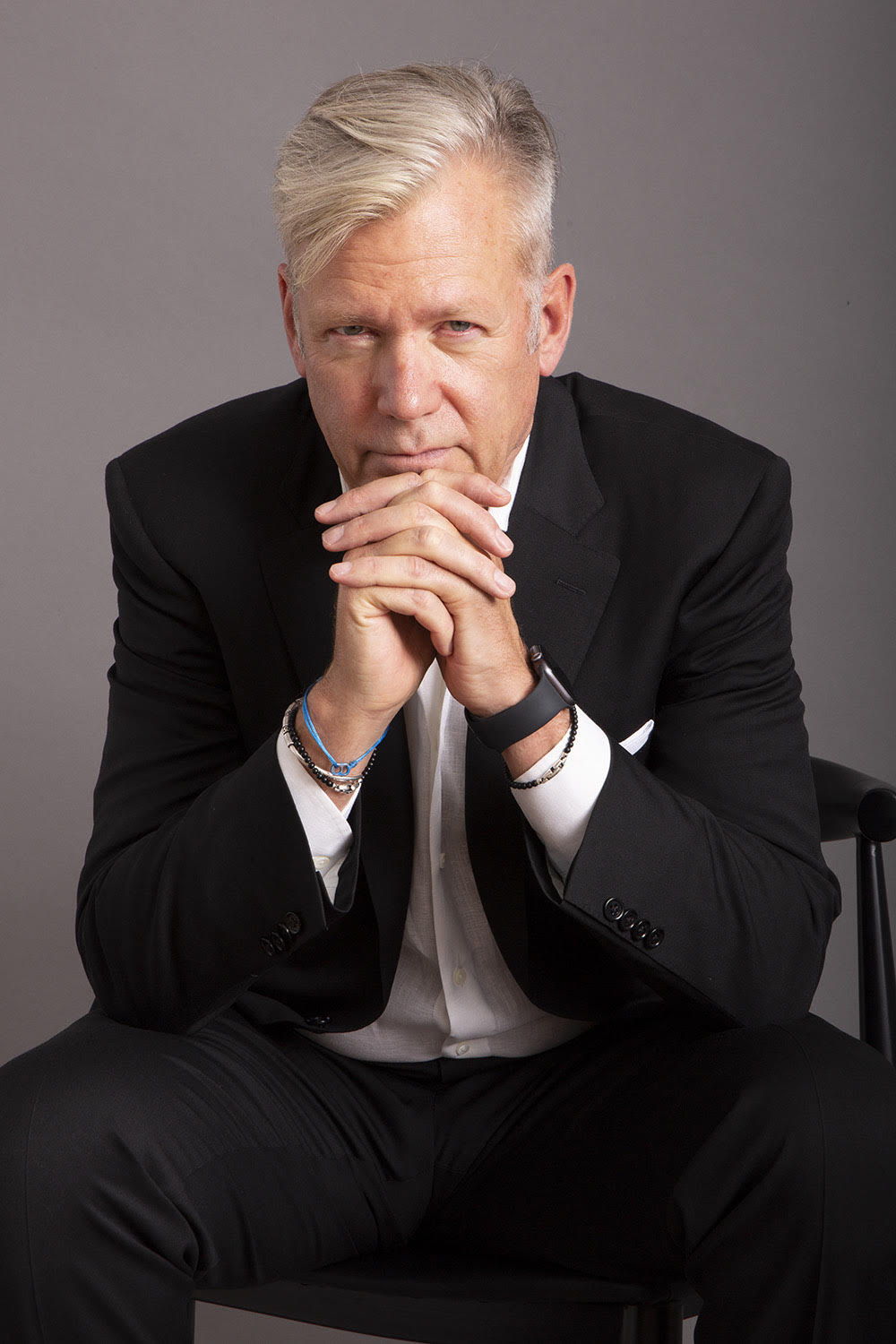
Chris Hansen announced an investigation on Vanity in 2020, including having multiple interviews with those who claim Vanity abused or raped them, including Slaughter.

Since 2009, at least 21 people have made sexual assault, child sexual abuse, and rape allegations against Vanity, with one leading to his arrest in 2009. Slaughter's 2010 videos were made in response to accusations that a friend had raped Slaughter, and that Slaughter had a sexual relationship with Vanity while Slaughter was a minor. Years later, Slaughter publicly alleged that the rumors sparking the original harassment were true, stating that Vanity began grooming and sexually abusing them in 2009 when they were only 10 years old. On March 2, 2018, Slaughter made a Tumblr post in which they publicly accused Vanity of rape for the first time. In 2019, 21 women accused Vanity of sexual assault, child sexual abuse, and rape, with many of them saying the attacks took place while they were under the age of consent.

In March 2020, Slaughter told journalist Chris Hansen of To Catch a Predator that Vanity sexually assaulted them in April 2009, when Slaughter was 10, and Vanity was 24. He was interviewed as part of Hansen's YouTube channel Have a Seat with Chris Hansen; Hansen described Slaughter as Vanity's "victim zero". Slaughter said he was at a party at which Vanity was present, and while they were in the bathroom of the house, Vanity coerced him to perform oral sex on him. During the next 16 months, Slaughter stated that Vanity had violently raped them under the guise of BDSM-style sexual activity. In 2010, Slaughter told a classmate that Vanity had molested them, but later told Insider that they used the term as a joke, and viewed the relationship as consensual. Slaughter also stated that had he not mentioned Vanity to classmates – which led to the case being discussed online – the abuse would have continued. Towards the end of his interview with Hansen, when he asked Slaughter what he would say to Vanity if he were watching the interview, he replied: "You done goofed."

Slaughter's interview led to public opinion shifting in their favor and against Vanity. Former Blood on the Dance Floor bandmates Garrett Ecstasy, who left the band in 2009, and Jayy Von Monroe, who left in 2016, have described Vanity as a sexual predator. In his own interview with Hansen, Monroe accused Vanity of abuse as well, stating that Vanity forced him to tour without his HIV medication, which nearly caused him to develop AIDS. Von Monroe also stated that he later made a full recovery after leaving the band in 2016. Jeffree Star and New Years Day members Ash Costello and Nikki Misery have stated that they observed Vanity engage in questionable or illegal sexual behavior during one of the Vans Warped Tours and also during the "All the Rage Tour 2012" in support of their third studio album of the same name around the early 2010s. Many of the accusers were underage during the alleged attacks. In early 2020, Hansen announced an investigation on Vanity, including having multiple interviews with those who claim Vanity abused or raped them. At the time, the FBI confirmed that they were also investigating the allegations against Vanity. As of 2026, no criminal charges have been brought against Vanity.

== See also ==
- Suicide of Megan Meier
- Suicide of Amanda Todd
