= All the Rage (Blood on the Dance Floor album) =

All the Rage!!

Studio album by Blood on the Dance Floor
- Released: June 14, 2011
- Recorded: 2010–2011
- Genres: Electropop, dance-pop
- Length: 51:50
- Label: Dark Fantasy

Blood on the Dance Floor chronology
| Epic (2010) | All the Rage!! (2011) | Epic: The Remixes (2012) |

Singles from All the Rage!!
- 1. "My Gift & My Curse!" Released: September 9, 2010; 2. "P.L.U.R." Released: April 15, 2011; 3. "G.F.A." Released: May 13, 2011; 4. "Bewitched" Released: June 1, 2011

All the Rage!! is the fourth studio album by American electronic music duo Blood on the Dance Floor, released on June 14, 2011. Commercially, it is their least successful album with Jayy Von Monroe. The album features three collaborations with the duo's protege Lady Nogrady.

== Track listing ==
All the Rage track listing
| No. | Title | Length |
|---|---|---|
| 1. | "Dark Dreams" (featuring Lady Nogrady) | 4:47 |
| 2. | "Find Your Way" | 3:27 |
| 3. | "Happy Violentine's Day" | 2:57 |
| 4. | "Bewitched" (featuring Lady Nogrady) | 3:47 |
| 5. | "Nirvana" | 3:15 |
| 6. | "All the Rage!" | 4:49 |
| 7. | "The Untouchables" | 3:54 |
| 8. | "X X 3" | 3:18 |
| 9. | "P.L.U.R." | 3:29 |
| 10. | "Star Power!" | 3:41 |
| 11. | "Yo, Ho" | 3:00 |
| 12. | "The Loving Dead" (Includes bonus track "Love Sucks!") | 7:05 |
| 13. | "My Gift & My Curse" (James Egbert Remix) | 4:00 |
| 14. | "G.F.A." (featuring JJ Demon, Nick Nasty and Lady Nogrady) | 4:08 |

== Personnel ==
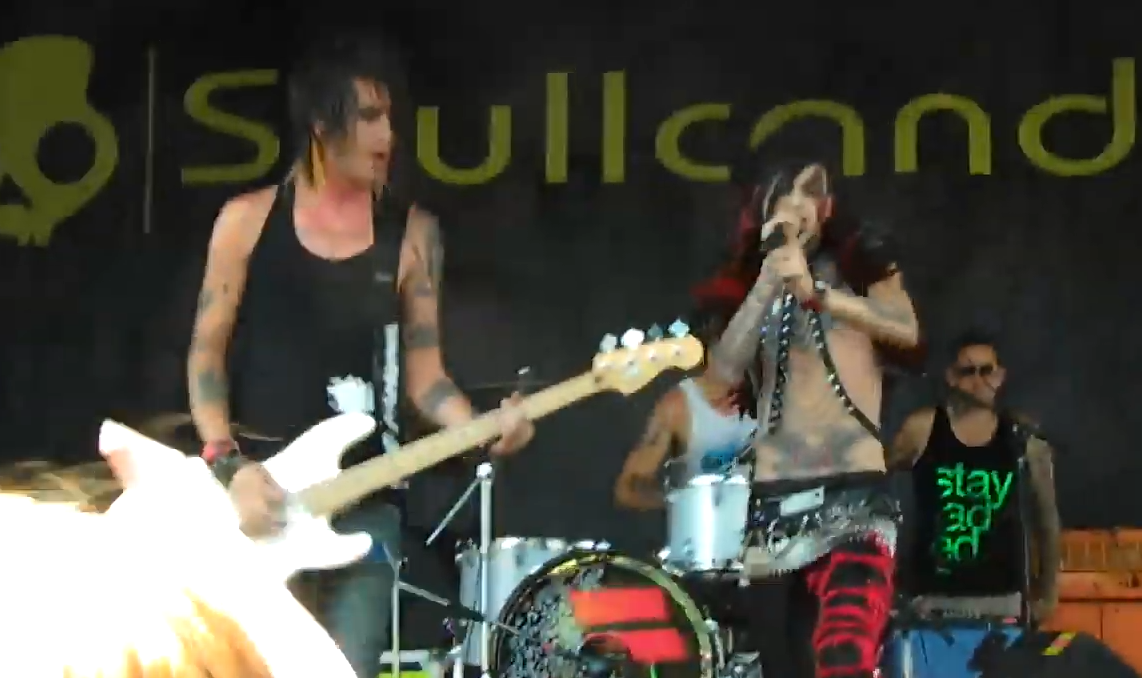
Blood on the Dance Floor performing at the 2011 Vans Warped Tour

Blood on the Dance Floor

- Jayy Von Monroe – clean and unclean vocals
- Dahvie Vanity – clean vocals

Additional musicians

- Lady Nogrady – vocals and violin
- JJ Demon – vocals and scratching
- Nick Nasty – vocals

== Charts ==
Chart performance for All the Rage
| Chart (2012) | Peak position |
|---|---|
| US Billboard Top Electronic Albums | 13 |
| US Billboard Top Heatseekers | 26 |
