= Bad Blood (Blood on the Dance Floor album) =

Studio album by Blood on the Dance Floor
- Released: September 3, 2013
- Recorded: 2012–2013
- Length: 45:05
- Label: Dark Fantasy

Blood on the Dance Floor chronology
The Revolution Pack (2012)	Bad Blood (2013)	Blood Unplugged (2013)

Singles from Bad Blood
- 1. "I Refuse to Sink (Fuck the Fame!)" Released: February 19, 2013; 2. "Something Grimm" Released: July 2, 2013

Bad Blood is the seventh studio album by US electronica duo Blood on the Dance Floor, released internationally on September 3, 2013. Although not reaching the same success as their previous effort, Evolution, it is their second-best selling release to date, peaking at No. 137 on the Billboard 200 albums chart.

== Background ==
At the beginning of 2013, there were major rumors claiming Blood on the Dance Floor had split when they withdrew from the Soundwave Festival. However, it turned out to be a hoax. Vanity completely denied all rumors of Blood on the Dance Floor disestablishing. In 2020, the 10th track of this album titled "Something Grimm" was brought up as plagiarism of the 2006 track "The Last Night" by Christian alternative rock band Skillet on the album Comatose.

The group released Bad Blood on September 3, 2013. On February 18, 2013, the lead single "I Refuse to Sink! (Fuck the Fame)" was released, followed by the second single "Crucified By Your Lies", followed by the third single, "Something Grimm", on July 2, 2013.

== Credits ==
Dahvie Vanity: Vocals, co-producer

Jayy von Monroe: Vocals

Rusty wilmot: Producer

James Egbert: Producer

== Critical reception ==
Professional ratings
Review scores
Source	Rating
AllMusic	3/5 stars

David Jeffries from AllMusic gave the album a mixed-to-positive review, noting the lyrics referring to lead singer Dahvie Vanity's rape allegations, and gave both positive and negative comments towards the themes the album addresses. He concluded his review by crediting the band's growth, saying "Bad Blood is better than before, or at least, bloodier."

== Track listing ==
Standard edition
No.	Title	Length
1.	"Unchained"	4:16
2.	"I Refuse to Sink"	4:00
3.	"Bad Blood"	3:21
4.	"Always & Forever"	4:28
5.	"Fake Is the New Trend" (featuring Haley Rose)	2:54
6.	"Damaged"	3:34
7.	"Bohemyth"	3:53
8.	"Divided We Fall"	3:29
9.	"Crucified by Your Lies"	4:24
10.	"Something Grimm"	3:49
11.	"Redeemer"	3:40
12.	"Mourning Star" (featuring Haley Rose)	3:43
13.	"Everyone Dies Alone"	0:23

Deluxe edition
No.	Title	Length
14.	"Sick Sad World"	4:33
15.	"Revenge Will Have Its Day"	3:59

Deluxe edition bonus DVD
No.	Title	Length
1.	"Bad Blood documentary"	61:35

iTunes censored edition
No.	Title	Length
8.	"Divided We Fall" (alternate/censored version; no longer available)	3:29

== Charts ==
Chart performance for Bad Blood
Chart (2012)	Peak position
US Billboard 200	137
US Top Dance Albums (Billboard)	2
US Independent Albums (Billboard)	29
