= Evolution (Blood on the Dance Floor album) =

Studio album by Blood on the Dance Floor
- Released: June 19, 2012
- Recorded: 2011–2012
- Genre: Dance-pop; electropop; dubstep; crunkcore
- Length: 55:46
- Label: Dark Fantasy

Blood on the Dance Floor chronology
Epic: The Remixes (2012)	Evolution (2012)	Clubbed to Death! (2012)

Singles from Evolution
- 1. "Revenge Porn!" Released: December 23, 2011; 2. "The Right to Love!" Released: February 13, 2012; 3. "Unforgiven" Released: March 13, 2012; 4. "Rise & Shine" Released: June 15, 2012

Evolution is the fifth studio album by American electronica duo Blood on the Dance Floor, released internationally on June 19, 2012. It is their first release to appear on the US Billboard 200, peaking at No. 42, and is their best-selling effort to date.

== Background ==
Evolution is composed of fourteen full songs with four interludes roughly a minute in length each. In a short video uploaded to the duo's official YouTube channel promoting the album, lead singer Dahvie Vanity said the album "represents my blood, sweat, and tears. My entire life and emotions." The album is notable for its collaborations, the opening track "Rise and Shine" featuring rapper Deuce. Other notable collaborations include Joel Madden of Good Charlotte and Amelia Arsenic of Angelspit.

== Critical reception ==
Professional ratings
Review scores
Source	Rating
AllMusic	2.5/5 stars
Sputnikmusic	1.5/5

David Jeffries from AllMusic gave the album a mixed review, saying "Evolution is awesome or awful depending on your point of view", and discussed and/or criticized some themes of the album. He picked "Unforgiven", "Frankenstein + the Bride", "Fantasyland", and "The Last Dance" as the album's highlights. Davey Boy from Sputnik Music gave the album a 1.5 (very poor) out of 5, saying "Sure, there has been some gradual growth since their horrid initial output, but improving on Shakespearian lyrics such as 'I'll throw a dildo in your grave, party up and start a rave' and 'My cum's so chunky, it's like an Oreo McFlurry' really isn't all that difficult." He chose Rise & Shine and Hollywood Tragedy as recommended tracks.

== Track listing ==
Standard edition
No.	Title	Writer(s)	Length
1.	"Rise & Shine" (featuring Deuce)		3:36
2.	"Unforgiven"		3:39
3.	"The Law of Love"		1:26
4.	"Frankenstein + the Bride" (featuring Haley Rose)		3:39
5.	"Fantasyland"		2:56
6.	"Revenge Porn!"		3:45
7.	"Mercy" (featuring Amelia Arsenic)		3:27
8.	"Hollywood Tragedy" (featuring Shawn Brandon)		3:41
9.	"Rampage of Love"		1:08
10.	"The Last Dance"		3:28
11.	"Incomplete and All Alone" (featuring Joel Madden)		3:48
12.	"Deja Vu"		3:36
13.	"You Are the Heart"	Lynn Edward Glezen, Rusty "Lixx" Wilmot	3:44
14.	"The Right to Love!"		4:08
15.	"Loveotomy"		3:30
16.	"Mother Earth"		1:12
17.	"Love Conquers All" (featuring Elena Vladi)		3:51
18.	"Love Is the Message"		1:12
Total length:			55:46

Deluxe edition
No.	Title	Length
19.	"Frankenstein + the Bride" (Acoustic Version)	3:44
20.	"Unforgiven" (Acoustic Version)	4:10

Digital deluxe edition
No.	Title	Length
21.	"Unforgiven" (Music Video)	4:41

== Personnel ==
Blood on the Dance Floor

- Dahvie Vanity – clean vocals
- Jayy Von Monroe – vocals, drums, guitar, bass, keys

== Charts ==
Chart performance for Evolution
Chart (2012)	Peak position
US Billboard 200	42
US Billboard Top Electronic Albums	1
US Billboard Top Independent Albums	8
