= Epic (Blood on the Dance Floor album) =

Studio album by Blood on the Dance Floor
- Released: October 5, 2010
- Recorded: 2009–2010
- Genre: Electropop, crunkcore, chiptune, dance-pop
- Length: 75:33
- Label: Dark Fantasy

Blood on the Dance Floor chronology
Extended Play (2009)	Epic (2010)	All the Rage!! (2011)

Singles from Epic
- 1. "Horrifically Delicious" Released: October 4, 2009; 2. "Success is the Best Revenge" Released: November 5, 2009; 3. "Sexting" Released: December 16, 2009; 4. "Inject Me Sweetly" Released: February 16, 2010; 5. "Candyland" Released: March 30, 2010; 6. "I'm What Dreams Are Made Of" Released: May 15, 2010; 7. "Lose Control" Released: June 1, 2010; 8. "You Done Goofed" Released: July 22, 2010; 9. "Party On" Released: July 28, 2010; 10. "Death to Your Heart!" Released: September 7, 2010

Epic is the third studio album by American electronic music duo Blood on the Dance Floor, released on October 5, 2010. The album is the group's first with Jayy Von Monroe and their first to appear on the US Billboard charts. Several of the tracks appeared on previous Blood on the Dance Floor releases and reappear here in a rerecorded format.

In 2020, the 17th track of this album titled "You Done Goofed" was brought up as evidence relating to the Jessi Slaughter sexual abuse and cyberbullying case, involving allegations of Vanity grooming and sexually assaulting multiple underage former fans, including the song's subject.

== Music videos ==
The first video was shot for the single "Death to Your Heart!". It was published on YouTube in December 2010. It centers on Blood on the Dance Floor members Dahvie Vanity and Jayy Von Monroe taking part in a joke fight with two girls. The first two rounds the girls are winning but in the final round Vanity and Von Monroe scare them and the girls and other fans begin to bleed.

== Track listing ==
Epic track listing
No.	Title	Length
1.	"Death to Your Heart!"	3:14
2.	"Beautiful Surgery"	3:48
3.	"Sugar Rush"	3:41
4.	"Lose Control"	3:51
5.	"Candyland"	3:25
6.	"Horrifically Delicious"	3:41
7.	"Lookin' Hot Dangerous!"	3:24
8.	"Inject Me Sweetly"	3:14
9.	"Sexting"	3:40
10.	"Lovestruck"	3:26
11.	"Scream for My Ice Cream"	2:58
12.	"Believe"	3:57
13.	"I'm What Dreams Are Made Of"	3:28
14.	"It's on Like Donkey Kong"	2:46
15.	"Party On"	3:31
16.	"Sluts Get Guts"	3:55
17.	"You Done Goofed"	5:01
18.	"Success is the Best Revenge"	3:12
19.	"Innocent High"	3:27
20.	"I.D.G.A.F."	3:25
21.	"F**k the Rest, We the Best!"	3:44
22.	"An Epic of Epicness"	0:45

== Personnel ==
Blood on the Dance Floor

- Dahvie Vanity – vocals, keyboards
- Jayy Von Monroe – clean and unclean vocals

Additional musicians

- Rusty Wilmot – drums, electronic beats, guitars, synths
- James Egbert (Basemint Sounds) – beats

== Charts ==
Chart performance for Epic
Chart (2012)	Peak position
US Billboard Top Electronic Albums	5
US Billboard Top Heatseekers	12
