= Bitchcraft (album) =

Studio album by Blood on the Dance Floor
- Released: June 10, 2014
- Recorded: 2013–2014
- Genre: Electronica; electropop; dubstep
- Length: 31:06
- Label: Dark Fantasy

Blood on the Dance Floor chronology
Blood Unplugged (2013)	Bitchcraft (2014)	Scissors (2016)

Singles from Bitchcraft
- 1. "Poison Apple" Released: February 28, 2014; 2. "Call Me Master" Released: April 20, 2014; 3. "Freaks Do It Better!" Released: May 31, 2014

Bitchcraft is the ninth studio album by the electronica duo Blood on the Dance Floor. The album was self-released on June 10, 2014, via Dark Fantasy Records. It includes 10 tracks, featuring collaborations by Shawn Brandon, William Control, Jeffree Star and Kerry Louise.

== Background ==
In the beginning of 2014, Blood On The Dance Floor posted on their Facebook page that Andrew 'Drew' Apathy would be joining the BOTDF team as their 'dark knight' and 'deputy'. Not long after they also announced their new EP 'Bitch Craft' which was set to be released late winter with a single being released in February. Their single 'We're Takin over!' featuring Deuce was released February 7. Other songs like "Poison Apple" featuring Jeffree Star, "Call Me Master", "Bitchcraft" (with the album's pre-order) and "Freaks Do It Better!" featuring Kerry Louise were released in iTunes. "Bitchcraft" was finally released as a 10-tracks album on June 10, 2014, including all the previously released singles except "We're Taking over!".

== Singles ==
The album is preceded by the buzz single "We're Takin' Over!" featuring rapper Deuce, released February 7, 2014 followed by "Poison Apple" featuring vocals by synthpop singer Jeffree Star released the 28 of the same month. The album includes a remastered version of the song. The title track was made available for free download with the pre-order of the album and another two songs "Call Me Master" and "Freaks Do It Better" featuring Kerry Louise were made available on April 20 and May 31, 2014, respectively.

== Track listing ==
Bitchcraft track listing
No.	Title	Length
1.	"Sorcery"	1:35
2.	"Bitchcraft"	3:23
3.	"3 X 3" (featuring Shawn Brandon)	3:32
4.	"Pure F***n' Evil" (featuring William Control)	3:53
5.	"Call Me Master"	3:25
6.	"Blaq Magick" (featuring Shawn Brandon)	3:40
7.	"Poison Apple" (featuring Jeffree Star)	3:21
8.	"Possession"	3:31
9.	"Freaks Do It Better!" (featuring Kerry Louise)	3:12
10.	"Obliviate"	1:34

== Personnel ==
Blood on the Dance Floor

- Jayy Von Monroe – clean and unclean vocals, guitars, production
- Dahvie Vanity – clean vocals

Additional personnel

- Rusty Wilmot – drums, bass, synths, programming
- Brandy Wynn – violin

== Chart performance ==
Chart performance for Bitchcraft
Chart (2014)	Peak position
US Billboard Dance/Electronic Albums	18
