= Falling in Reverse discography =

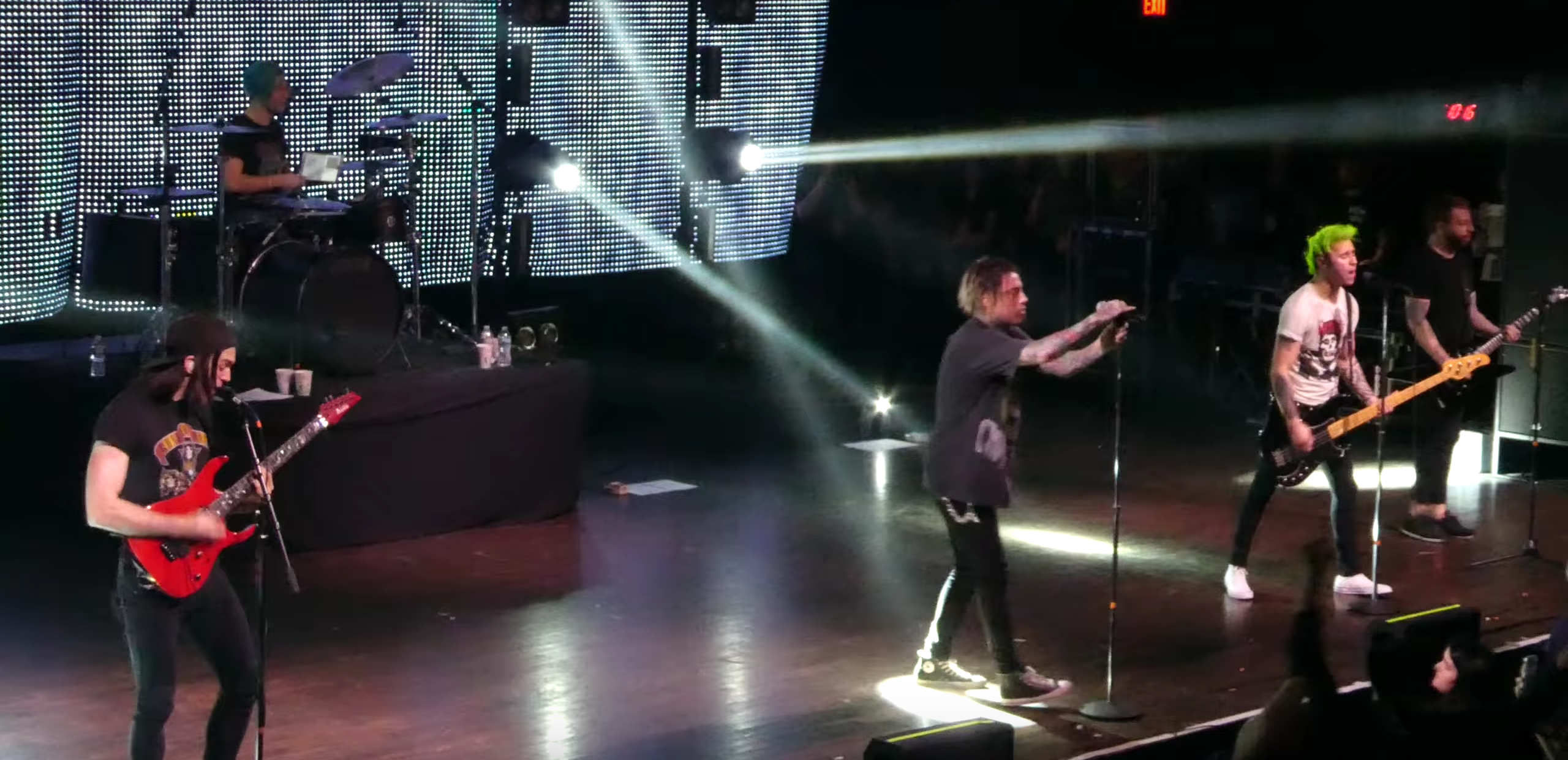
- Falling in Reverse performing in 2017
- Studio albums: 5
- Singles: 38
- Music videos: 29
- Demo albums: 1
- Other appearances: 2

The American rock band Falling in Reverse has released five studio albums, one demo album, thirty-eight singles, twenty-nine music videos and two other appearances.

The group released its debut album, The Drug in Me Is You, on July 26, 2011, which peaked at number 19 on the Billboard 200, selling 18,000 copies in its first week. The album was certified gold by RIAA in 2019, equivalent to 500,000 copies sold. The band's second studio album, Fashionably Late, was released on June 18, 2013, which peaked at number 17 on the Billboard 200, selling 20,000 copies in its first week. The band released their third album Just Like You on February 24, 2015, which peaked at number 21 on the Billboard 200. Coming Home, their latest album, was released on April 7, 2017, and peaked at number 34 on the Billboard 200.

The band's first single to debut on the music charts was "Alone", which was released on May 7, 2013. The song peaked at number 27 on Billboard's Hot Rock & Alternative Songs chart. It also debuted at number 14 on the UK Rock & Metal Singles Chart. "Fashionably Late" was their second single from the band to chart on the Hot Rock & Alternative Songs chart, peaking at number 46; the song was released on May 20, 2013. On December 15, 2014, the band released the single "God, If You Are Above...", The song reached number 45 on the Hot Rock & Alternative Songs chart and also the song debuted on Billboard's Mainstream Rock chart, being the first time that the band is positioned on this list, it reached number 28. On January 17, 2017, the band released the single "Loser", the song reached number 35 on the Hot Rock & Alternative Songs chart. On July 10, 2017, the band released the single "Superhero", the song reached number 22 on the Mainstream Rock chart. On February 22, 2018, the band released the single "Losing My Mind", the song reached number 50 on the Hot Rock & Alternative Songs chart. On November 20, 2019, the band released the single "Popular Monster", the song reached the top of the Billboard rock charts. The song reached number four on the Hot Rock & Alternative Songs chart and reached number one on the Mainstream Rock chart, being their first song to reach the top spot on the chart. In addition, the song reached number 15 on the Rock Airplay chart and number 38 on the Canada Rock chart, being the first time that the band was positioned on these charts. Additionally, the song debuted at number one on Billboard's Hot Hard Rock Songs chart. The song also debuted at number 17 on the UK Rock & Metal Singles Chart and also at number 33 on the main Hungarian chart. On February 13, 2020, the band released the reimagined version of "The Drug in Me Is You" called "The Drug in Me Is Reimagined"; the song reached number 29 on the Hot Rock & Alternative Songs chart and also number 32 on Hungary's singles chart.

== Albums ==
=== Studio albums ===
List of studio albums, with selected chart positions and certifications
| Title | Album details | Peak chart positions | | | | | | | | | | Certifications |
| Title | Album details | US | AUS | AUT | CAN | FIN | GER | NZ | SCO | SWI | UK | Certifications |
|---|---|---|---|---|---|---|---|---|---|---|---|---|
| The Drug in Me Is You | Released: July 26, 2011 (US); Label: Epitaph; Formats: CD, LP, digital download | 19 | 21 | — | 60 | — | — | — | — | — | 125 | RIAA: Gold; BPI: Silver |
| Fashionably Late | Released: June 18, 2013 (US); Label: Epitaph; Formats: CD, LP, digital download | 17 | 20 | — | — | — | — | — | 100 | — | 75 | |
| Just Like You | Released: February 24, 2015 (US); Label: Epitaph; Formats: CD, LP, digital download | 21 | 8 | — | — | — | — | 27 | 55 | — | 57 | |
| Coming Home | Released: April 7, 2017 (US); Label: Epitaph; Formats: CD, LP, digital download | 34 | 16 | — | — | — | — | — (Note: Coming Home did not enter the New Zealand Albums Chart, but peaked at number 3 on the New Zealand Heatseekers Albums chart.) | 87 | — | 89 | |
| Popular Monster | Released: August 16, 2024; Label: Epitaph; Formats: CD, LP, digital download | 12 | 7 | 2 | 43 | 28 | 10 | 28 | 12 | 9 | 29 | RIAA: Gold; ARIA: Gold; BPI: Silver |
"—" denotes a recording that did not chart or was not released in that territory.

== Singles ==
List of singles, with selected chart positions, showing year released, certifications and album name
| Title | Year | Peak chart positions | | | | | | | | | | Certifications | Album |
| Title | Year | US | US Rock | AUS | CAN | CAN Rock | HUN | NZ Hot | UK | UK Rock | WW | Certifications | Album |
|---|---|---|---|---|---|---|---|---|---|---|---|---|---|
| "Raised by Wolves" | 2011 | — | — | — | — | — | — | — | — | — | — | | The Drug in Me Is You |
| "The Drug in Me Is You" | 2011 | — | — | — | — | — | — | — | — | — | — | BPI: Silver; RMNZ: Gold | The Drug in Me Is You |
| "I'm Not a Vampire" | 2011 | — | — | — | — | — | — | — | — | — | — | BPI: Silver | The Drug in Me Is You |
| "Good Girls, Bad Guys" | 2012 | — | — | — | — | — | — | — | — | — | — | | The Drug in Me Is You |
| "Pick Up the Phone" | 2012 | — | — | — | — | — | — | — | — | — | — | | The Drug in Me Is You |
| "Alone" | 2013 | — | 27 | — | — | — | — | — | — | 14 | — | | Fashionably Late |
| "Fashionably Late" | 2013 | — | 46 | — | — | — | — | — | — | — | — | | Fashionably Late |
| "Born to Lead" | 2013 | — | — | — | — | — | — | — | — | — | — | | Fashionably Late |
| "Bad Girls Club" | 2013 | — | — | — | — | — | — | — | — | — | — | | Fashionably Late |
| "Gangsta's Paradise" (Coolio and L.V. cover) | 2014 | — | — | — | — | — | — | — | — | — | — | | Punk Goes 90s Vol. 2 |
| "God, If You Are Above..." | 2014 | — | 45 | — | — | — | — | — | — | — | — | | Just Like You |
| "Guillotine IV (The Final Chapter)" | 2015 | — | — | — | — | — | — | — | — | — | — | | Just Like You |
| "Stay Away" | 2015 | — | — | — | — | — | — | — | — | — | — | | Just Like You |
| "Sexy Drug" | 2015 | — | — | — | — | — | — | — | — | — | — | | Just Like You |
| "Just Like You" | 2015 | — | — | — | — | — | — | — | — | — | — | | Just Like You |
| "Chemical Prisoner" | 2016 | — | — | — | — | — | — | — | — | — | — | | Just Like You |
| "Coming Home" | 2016 | — | — (Note: "Coming Home" did not enter the US Hot Rock Songs chart, but peaked at number 12 on the US Hard Rock Digital Songs Sales chart.) | — | — | — | — | — | — | — | — | | Coming Home |
| "Loser" | 2017 | — | 35 | — | — | — | — | — | — | — | — | | Coming Home |
| "Broken" | 2017 | — | — (Note: "Broken" did not enter the US Hot Rock Songs chart, but peaked at number 23 on the US Hard Rock Digital Songs Sales chart.) | — | — | — | — | — | — | — | — | | Coming Home |
| "Superhero" | 2017 | — | — (Note: "Superhero" did not enter the US Hot Rock & Alternative Songs chart, but peaked at number 22 on the US Mainstream Rock chart.) | — | — | — | — | — | — | — | | | Coming Home |
| "Fuck You and All Your Friends" | 2017 | — | — | — | — | — | — | — | — | — | — | | Coming Home |
| "Losing My Mind" | 2018 | — | 50 | — | — | — | — | — | — | — | — | | Non-album singles |
| "Losing My Life" | 2018 | — | — | — | — | — | — | — | — | — | — | | Non-album singles |
| "Drugs" (featuring Corey Taylor) | 2019 | — | — (Note: "Drugs" did not enter the US Hot Rock Songs chart, but peaked at number 21 on the US Hot Hard Rock Songs chart.) | — | — | — | — | — | — | — | | | Non-album singles |
| "Popular Monster" | 2019 | — | 4 | — | — | 38 | 33 | — | — | 17 | — | RIAA: 3× Platinum; ARIA: 3× Platinum; BPI: Silver; RMNZ: Gold | Popular Monster |
| "The Drug in Me Is Reimagined" | 2020 | — | 29 | — | — | — | 32 | — | — | — | — | | Non-album singles |
| "Carry On" | 2020 | — | — (Note: "Carry On" did not enter the US Hot Rock Songs chart, but peaked at number 11 on the US Hot Hard Rock Songs chart.) | — | — | — | — | — | — | — | — | | Non-album singles |
| "I'm Not a Vampire (Revamped) | 2021 | — | — (Note: "I'm Not a Vampire (Revamped)" did not enter the US Hot Rock Songs chart, but peaked at number 3 on the US Hot Hard Rock Songs chart.) | — | — | — | — | — | — | — | — | | Non-album singles |
| "Zombified" | 2022 | — (Note: "Zombified" did not enter the Hot 100, but peaked at number 35 on the US Digital Songs chart.) | 16 | — | — (Note: "Zombified" did not enter the Canadian Hot 100, but peaked at number 26 on the Canadian Digital Songs Sales chart.) | 31 | — | 34 | — (Note: "Zombified" did not enter the UK Singles Chart, but peaked at number 60 on the UK Singles Sales Chart.) | 12 | — | RIAA: Gold | Popular Monster |
| "Voices in My Head" | 2022 | — (Note: "Voices in My Head" did not enter the Hot 100, but peaked at number 25 on the US Digital Songs chart.) | 19 | — | — | — | 30 | 40 | — (Note: "Voices in My Head" did not enter the UK Singles Chart, but peaked at number 93 on the UK Singles Sales Chart.) | — | — | RIAA: Gold | Popular Monster |
| "Watch the World Burn" | 2023 | 83 | 8 | — | 77 | — | 38 | 16 | 95 | — (Note: "Watch the World Burn" did not enter the UK Rock & Metal Singles Chart, but peaked at number 32 on the UK Independent Singles Chart.) | 149 | RIAA: Gold; BPI: Silver | Popular Monster |
| "Last Resort (Reimagined)" (Papa Roach cover) | 2023 | — (Note: "Last Resort Reimagined" did not enter the Hot 100, but peaked at number 6 on the US Digital Songs chart.) | 13 | — | — (Note: "Last Resort Reimagined" did not enter the Canadian Hot 100, but peaked at number 26 on the Canadian Digital Song Sales chart.) | — | — | 33 | — (Note: "Last Resort" did not enter the UK Singles Chart, but peaked at number 39 on the UK Singles Sales Chart.) | — | — | | Popular Monster |
| "Ronald" (featuring Tech N9ne and Alex Terrible) | 2024 | — (Note: "Ronald" did not enter the Hot 100, but peaked at number 13 on the Bubbling Under Hot 100 chart.) | 12 | — | — | — | — | 27 | — (Note: "Ronald" did not enter the UK Singles Chart, but peaked at number 88 on the UK Singles Sales Chart.) | 20 | — | | Popular Monster |
| "All My Life" (featuring Jelly Roll) | 2024 | 77 | 14 | — | — (Note: "All My Life" did not enter the Canadian Hot 100, but peaked at number 17 on the Canadian Digital Songs Sales chart.) | 32 | — | 24 | — (Note: "All My Life" did not enter the UK Singles Chart, but peaked at number 51 on the UK Singles Sales Chart.) | 21 | — | | Popular Monster |
| "Prequel" | 2024 | — | 37 | — | — | — | — | 18 | — | — | — | | Popular Monster |
| "God Is a Weapon" (featuring Marilyn Manson) | 2025 | — (Note: "God Is a Weapon" did not enter the Hot 100, but peaked at number 24 on the US Digital Songs chart.) | 26 | — | — | — | — | 15 | — (Note: "God Is a Weapon" did not enter the UK Singles Chart, but peaked at number 61 on the UK Singles Sales Chart.) | 32 | — | | Non-album singles |
| "All My Women" (featuring Hardy) | 2025 | — | 29 | — | — | — | — | — | — | — | — | | Non-album singles |
| "Joseph" (featuring Corey Taylor and Serj Tankian) | 2026 | 82 | 20 | 68 | 58 | — | — | 8 | 71 | 9 | 82 | | Non-album singles |
"—" denotes a recording that did not chart or was not released in that territory.

== Other charted songs ==
List of other charted songs, with selected chart positions, showing year released and album name
| Title | Year | Peak chart positions | | | | | | Album |
| Title | Year | US Alt. Digi. | US Hard Rock | US Main. | US Rap Digi. | US Rock Air. | NZ Hot | Album |
|---|---|---|---|---|---|---|---|---|
| "Bad Guy" (featuring Saraya Bevis) | 2024 | 10 | 4 | 1 | — | 14 | 38 | Popular Monster |
| "Trigger Warning" | 2024 | — | 6 | — | — | — | — | Popular Monster |
| "No Fear" | 2024 | — | — | — | 8 | — | — | Popular Monster |
"—" denotes a recording that did not chart or was not released in that territory.

== Other appearances ==
| Title | Year | Album |
|---|---|---|
| "Gangsta's Paradise" (Coolio cover) | 2014 | Punk Goes 90's 2 |
| "She's a Rebel" (Green Day cover) | 2014 | Kerrang! Does Green Day's American Idiot |

== Music videos ==
List of music videos, showing year released and directors
| Title | Year | Director(s) | Ref. |
|---|---|---|---|
| "The Drug in Me Is You" | 2011 | Zach Merck | |
| "I'm Not a Vampire" | 2011 | Zach Merck | |
| "Raised by Wolves" | 2012 | Drew Russ | |
| "Good Girls, Bad Guys" | 2012 | Zach Merck | |
| "Alone" | 2013 | David Solomini | |
| "Bad Girls Club" | 2013 | Zach Merck | |
| "Gangsta's Paradise" | 2014 | Dan Centrone | |
| "Just Like You" | 2015 | Zach Merck | |
| "Chemical Prisoner" | 2016 | Zach Merck | |
| "Coming Home" | 2017 | Jeb Hardwick | |
| "Superhero" | 2017 | Ethan Lader | |
| "Fuck You and All Your Friends" | 2017 | Ethan Lader | |
| "Losing My Mind" | 2018 | Ethan Lader | |
| "Losing My Life" | 2018 | Ethan Lader | |
| "Drugs" | 2019 | Ethan Lader | |
| "Popular Monster" | 2019 | Jensen Noen | |
| "The Drug in Me Is Reimagined" | 2020 | Jensen Noen | |
| "I'm Not a Vampire (Revamped)" | 2021 | Jensen Noen | |
| "Zombified" | 2022 | Jensen Noen | |
| "Voices in My Head" | 2022 | Jensen Noen | |
| "Watch the World Burn" | 2023 | Jensen Noen | |
| "Last Resort (Reimagined)" | 2023 | Jensen Noen | |
| "Ronald" | 2024 | Jensen Noen | |
| "All My Life" | 2024 | Jensen Noen | |
| "Prequel" | 2024 | Jensen Noen | |
| "Bad Guy" | 2024 | Jensen Noen | |
| "God Is a Weapon" | 2025 | Jensen Noen | |
| "All My Women" | 2025 | Jensen Noen | |
| "Joseph" | 2026 | Jensen Noen | |
