= List of Falling in Reverse band members =

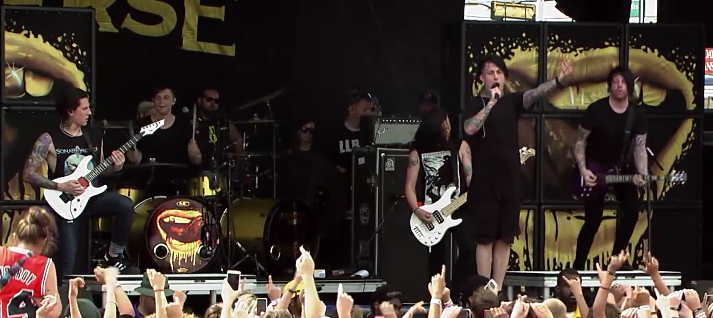
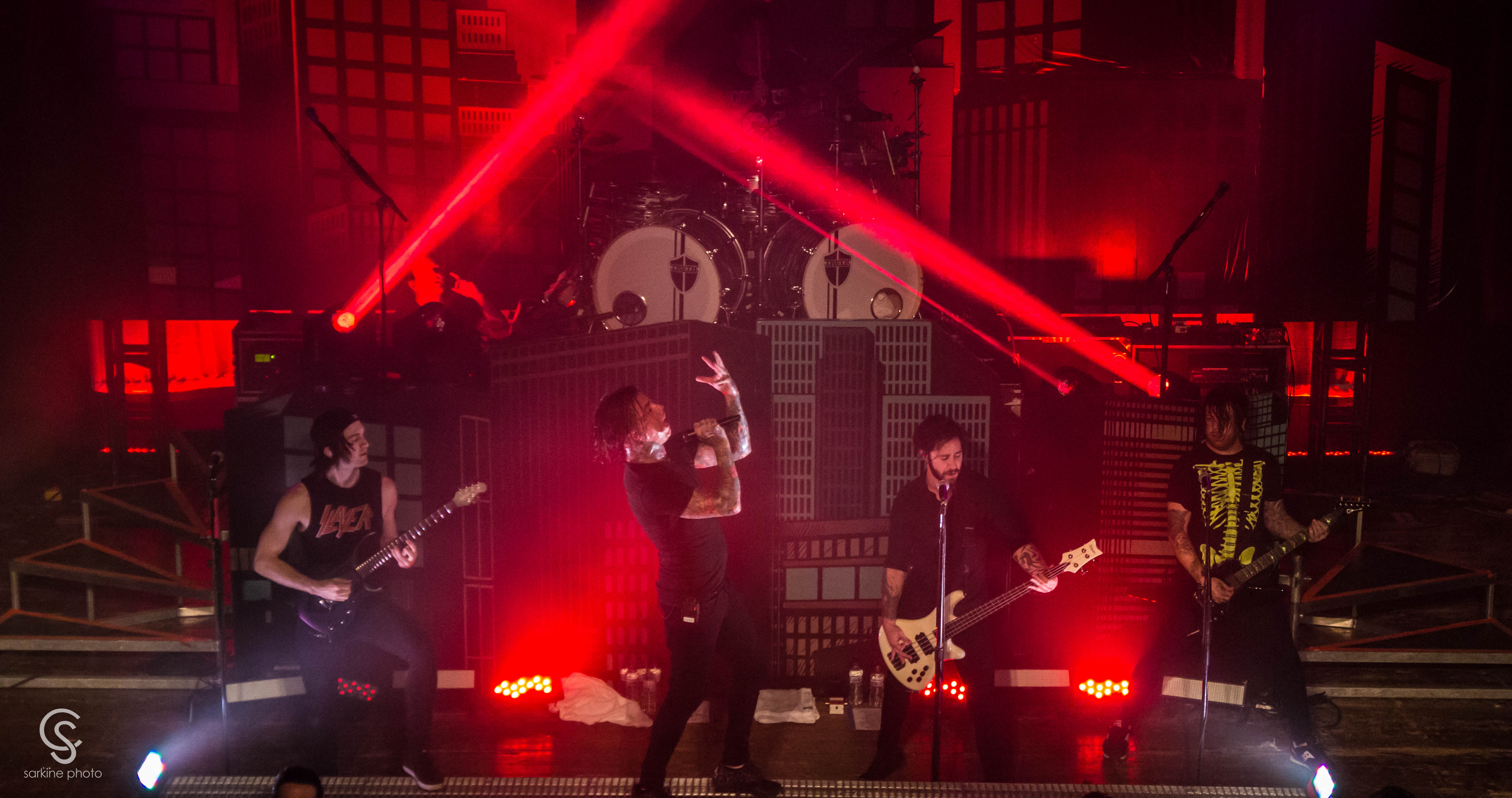
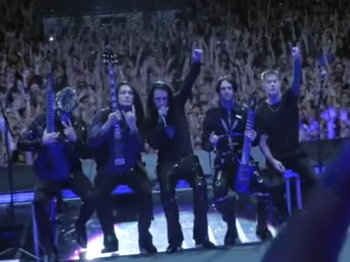
Three line-ups performing in 2014, 2015 and 2023

Falling in Reverse is an American rock band based in Las Vegas, Nevada that formed in 2008 by lead vocalist Ronnie Radke and bassist Nason Schoeffler while Radke was incarcerated. The band is currently led by lead vocalist Radke, alongside guitarist Christian Thompson, and drummer Luke Holland, who started as a touring drummer but officially joined the band shortly after. The band was originally founded by lead vocalist Ronnie Radke and bassist Nason Schoeffler, who helped find guitarists Jacky Vincent and Derek Jones. The band has recorded five albums with five different studio lineups.

== History ==
The band's first line-up started with british guitarist Jacky Vincent, A Smile From the Trenches guitarist Derek Jones, LoveHateHero drummer Scott Gee. At the beginning of April 2011, drummer Scott Gee left the band after finalizing the recordings of the debut studio album The Drug in Me Is You. He was replaced by former I Am Ghost and The Bigger Lights drummer Ryan Seaman. Days after Gee's departure, bassist Nason Schoeffler announced his departure from the band in order to be the lead singer of the band MeMyselfAlive. He was replaced by former Cellador bassist Mika Horiuchi. Despite not having participation on the album, Seaman and Horiuchi were included in the credits of their debut album The Drug in Me Is You.

In early 2012 after the release of their debut album The Drug in Me Is You, the band announced the departure of bassist Mika Horiuchi. He was replaced by former I Am Ghost bassist Ron Ficarro. In May 2014, the band announced the departure of bassist Ron Ficarro after his participation in the album Fashionably Late released in 2013. On that same day they announced that he would be replaced by former bassist and co-founder of Escape the Fate, Max Green (who had announced his departure from Escape the Fate days before after his return to the band in late 2013).

In October 2014 the band had announced the departure of bassist Max Green, the departure being friendly. He was replaced by Casval Wolfe of Vespera. On February 24, 2015 the band released their third studio album called Just Like You. It was the band's first album to be released without an official bassist. In the days of the album's release, former Black Tide bassist Zakk Sandler began playing with Falling in Reverse, later an official member announced. At the end of October 2015, the band announced the departure of guitarist Jacky Vincent. The departure was the most emotional in the band. Jacky announced his departure in order to continue his solo career. He was replaced by guitarist Christian Thompson.

In April 2017, days after the fourth studio album Coming Home was released, the departure of drummer Ryan Seaman was rumored. This was confirmed a month later when former There for Tomorrow drummer Chris Kamrada appeared performing with the band. In March 2018, in the middle of a tour of the United States, lead guitarist Christian Thompson announced that he had suffered a shoulder injury. In April of that same year he announced his departure from the band for personal reasons and he was replaced by Tyler Burgess.

On June 26, 2018, the band had released the single "Losing My Life" and their participation in the latest Vans Warped Tour. The band presented a new lineup consisting of guitarist Max Georgiev, bassist Tyler Burgess and drummer Brandon "Rage" Richter; bassist Zakk Sandler was now the keyboardist, percussionist and guitarist. In October 2018 before beginning the acoustic tour "The Roast of Ronnie Radke Tour", drummer Brandon Richter left the band without explanation. On April 8, 2019, the band released the single "Drugs", keyboardist Zakk Sandler is not shown in the music video, it was rumored that he had also left the band, this was confirmed later by Sandler, but announced that his departure was friendly.

On October 13, 2019, the band performed at the Aftershock Festival with new drummer Johnny Mele. On April 22, 2020, vocalist Ronnie Radke announced on social media the death of rhythm guitarist Derek Jones; his cause of death was later revealed as subdural hematoma in Radke's book I Can Explain. Jones was the only member after Radke to be with the band from the beginning, leaving four studio albums recorded (The Drug in Me Is You, Fashionably Late, Just Like You and Coming Home). On October 18, 2020, former guitarist Christian Thompson announced his return to the band replacing Derek Jones. At the beginning of 2021, bassist Tyler Burgess and drummer Johnny Mele left the band. This was confirmed when Wes Horton III appeared as bassist and Luke Holland as drummer in the promotional video of the band's online concert. However, in mid-2022, bassist Wes Horton left the band without any explanation, marking the return of Tyler Burgess to the band.

Following the release of Popular Monster (2024) Max Georgiev left the band and was replaced by Marc Okubo. In June 2025, Daniel “DL” Laskiewicz began playing bass with Falling in Reverse with no announcement of the status of Burgess.

== Members ==
=== Current ===
Image	Name	Years active	Instruments	Release contributions
	Ronnie Radke	2008–present	lead vocals; keyboards; rhythm guitar (2017–2018)	all Falling in Reverse releases
	Christian Thompson	2015–2018; 2020–present	lead guitar (2015–2018, 2024–present); rhythm guitar (2020–2024); backing vocals	all releases since Coming Home (2017)
	Luke Holland	2021–present	drums; percussion	all releases since Popular Monster (2024)
	Marc Okubo	2024–present	rhythm guitar	"All My Women" (2025)
	Daniel "DL" Laskiewicz	2025–present	bass; backing vocals	"All My Women" (2025)

=== Former ===
Image	Name	Years active	Instruments	Release contributions
	Derek Jones	2008–2020 (until his death)	rhythm guitar; backing vocals	all Falling in Reverse releases from The Drug in Me Is You (2011) to "Popular Monster" (2019)
	Nason Schoeffler	2008–2011	bass; backing vocals	The Drug in Me Is You (uncredited performance) (2011)
	Jacky Vincent	2009–2015	lead guitar; backing vocals	all Falling in Reverse releases from The Drug in Me Is You (2011) to Just Like You (2015)
	Nick Rich	2009–2010	drums; percussion	Only Falling in Reverse demos
	Scott Gee	2010–2011	drums; percussion; backing vocals	The Drug in Me Is You (uncredited performance) (2011)
	Ryan Seaman	2011–2017	drums; percussion; backing vocals	all Falling in Reverse releases from The Drug in Me Is You (2011) to Coming Home (2017)
	Mika Horiuchi	2011–2012	bass; backing vocals	The Drug in Me Is You (2011)
	Ron Ficarro	2012–2014	bass; backing vocals	Fashionably Late (2013)
	Max Green	2014	bass; backing vocals	Credits on Fashionably Late re-issue (2014)
	Zakk Sandler	2015–2019	bass (2015–2018); keyboards, percussion and rhythm guitar (2018–2019); backing vocals	Coming Home (2017)
	Max Georgiev	2018–2024	lead guitar; backing vocals	"Losing My Life" (2018); "Drugs" (2019); Popular Monster (2024)
	Brandon "Rage" Richter	2018	drums; percussion	"Losing My Life" (2018)
	Johnny Mele	2019–2021	drums; percussion; backing vocals	The Drug In Me Is Reimagined (2020); Popular Monster (2024)
	Wes Horton	2021–2022	bass; backing vocals	Popular Monster (2024)
	Tyler Burgess	2018–2021; 2022–2025	bass (2018–2021, 2022–2025); backing vocals; lead guitar (2018)	Popular Monster (2024)
	Christian "CC" Coma	2019	drums	"Drugs" (2019)

== Other contributors ==
=== Touring ===
Image	Name	Years active	Instruments
	Casval J. Wolfe	2014–2015	bass; backing vocals
	Chris Kamrada	2017	drums; percussion
	Michael Levine	2017–2018; 2018	drums; percussion
	Anthony Ghazel	2018; 2018–2019	drums; percussion

=== Session ===
Image	Name	Years active	Instruments	Release contributions
	Michael "Elvis" Baskette	2011–2017	additional writing; keyboards; production; strings; additional vocals; production; mixing; mastering; programming	all Falling in Reverse releases from The Drug in Me Is You (2011) to Coming Home (2017)
	Trace Cyrus	2011	additional writing; guitars; additional vocals; keyboards; percussion	The Drug in Me Is You (2011)
	David Holdredge	2011	additional writing; keyboards; strings; additional vocals	The Drug in Me Is You (2011)
	Jeff Moll	2011	additional vocals; digital editing	The Drug in Me Is You (2011) and Coming Home (2017)
	Bryan Ross	2011	additional writing; guitar; drums	The Drug in Me Is You (2011)
	Kevin Thomas	2011	assistant engineer	The Drug in Me Is You (2011)
	Omar Espinosa	2011–2013	additional writing	all Falling in Reverse releases from The Drug in Me Is You (2011) to Fashionably Late (2013)
	Nick Pritchard	2011	artwork; design	The Drug in Me Is You (2011)
	Devin Taylor	2011	photography	The Drug in Me Is You (2011)
	Matt Grayson	2011	photography	The Drug in Me Is You (2011)
	Ryan Ogren	2013	strings; synthesizer; additional production	Fashionably Late (2013)
	Chris Lord-Alge	2013	mixing	Fashionably Late (2013)
	Rusty Cooley	2013	guitar solo on "Born to Lead"	Fashionably Late (2013)
	Pete Rutcho	2013	mixing	Fashionably Late (2013)
	Ted Jensen	2013	mastering	Fashionably Late (2013)
	Charles Kallaghan Massabo	2015	additional production; synth; bass	Just Like You (2015)
	Tyler Smyth	2017–present	production; bass; guitar	all Falling in Reverse releases from Coming Home (2017) to present
	Steve Aiello	2017	additional writing	Coming Home (2017)
	Cody Stewart	2018	additional writing	"Losing My Mind" (2018)
	Cody Quistad	2019–present	guitar; additional writing	"Drugs" (2019); Popular Monster (2024); "God Is A Weapon" (2025)
	Corey Taylor	2019; 2026	guest vocals	"Drugs" (2019); "Joseph" (2026)
	Jon Lundin	2024	additional writing	Popular Monster (2024)
	Jason Richardson	2024	additional writing; guitars	Popular Monster (2024)
	Tech N9ne	2024	guest vocals	Popular Monster (2024)
	Alex Terrible	2024	guest vocals	Popular Monster (2024)
	Jelly Roll	2024	guest vocals	Popular Monster (2024)
	Saraya Bevis	2024	guest vocals	Popular Monster (2024)
	Sean Rooney	2024	arrangement; orchestra; piano	Popular Monster (2024)
	Marilyn Manson	2025	guest vocals	"God Is A Weapon" (2025)
	Hardy	2025	guest vocals	"All My Women" (2025)
	Serj Tankian	2026	guest vocals	"Joseph" (2026)
