= Voices in My Head (Falling in Reverse song) =

Single released in 2023

Single by Falling in Reverse

from the album Popular Monster
- Released: May 31, 2022
- Recorded: 2021
- Genre: Metalcore; electronicore; rap metal; djent
- Length: 3:12
- Label: Epitaph
- Songwriters: Ronald Joseph Radke; Tyler Smyth; Charles Kallaghan Massabo; Cody Quistad
- Producers: Tyler Smyth; Ronnie Radke

Falling in Reverse singles chronology
| "Zombified" (2022) | "Voices in My Head" (2022) | "Watch the World Burn" (2023) |

Music video
- "Voices in My Head" on YouTube

"Voices in My Head" is a song by American rock band Falling in Reverse. It was released on May 31, 2022, through Epitaph Records. It was released as a standalone single and was later included on their fifth studio album Popular Monster. The song was again produced by DangerKids vocalist Tyler Smyth and frontman Ronnie Radke. The song marks the return of bassist Tyler Burgess to the band.

== Promotion and release ==
The band released the song through Epitaph Records accompanied by a release for their upcoming tour with Papa Roach, Hollywood Undead and Bad Wolves called "Rockzilla Summer Tour". The song reached 12 million streams in just one week on all platforms. In addition, the song reached 1 million views in just one week on YouTube. Like the previous single "Zombified", the song will be part of the band's next EP Neon Zombie, which is expected to be released sometime in 2023. But the band later never announced any preview or estimated date for the EP.

On May 7, 2024 the band released the single "Ronald" and after 7 years of the release of their fourth studio album Coming Home, the band finally announced that they would be releasing their fifth studio album called Popular Monster and it will be released on August 16, 2024.

== Composition and lyrics ==
The song was composed by Falling in Reverse and was written by vocalist Ronnie Radke and producers/musicians Tyler Smyth of DangerKids, Charles Massabo and Cody Quistad, who had collaborated on previous songs. With "Zombified" taking the music industry and a few political YouTubers by storm, it was only in Ronnie Radke’s willpower to top it up once again, making an event bigger than the last one. With "Voices In My Head", Radke takes it one step further, providing much heavier riffs than "Zombified", which seemed impossible at the time.

== Music video ==
The music video was again directed by Jensen Noen who had directed previous music videos for the band. For the music video, Ronnie wanted to project something different:

"I wanted to capture what it’s like battling with your your past, present, and future perception of self, and the voices in everyone's head hindering them from their full potential".

== Personnel ==
Falling in Reverse

- Ronnie Radke – lead vocals, programming, producer, additional guitar
- Max Georgiev – lead guitar, backing vocals
- Christian Thompson – rhythm guitar, backing vocals
- Luke Holland – drums, percussion
- Tyler Burgess – bass, backing vocals

Additional personnel

- Tyler Smyth – production, strings, additional writing, recording, mastering, programming, engineered
- Cody Quistad – additional writing, guitars
- Charles Kallaghan Massabo – composer, programming, engineer

== Charts ==
=== Weekly charts ===
Weekly chart performance for "Voices in My Head"
| Chart (2022) | Peak position |
|---|---|
| Australia Digital Tracks (ARIA) | 45 |
| Germany Rock Airplay (Official German Charts) | 1 |
| Hungary (Single Top 40) | 30 |
| New Zealand Hot Singles (RMNZ) | 40 |
| UK Singles Sales (OCC) | 93 |
| UK Singles Downloads (Official Charts) | 90 |
| US Digital Song Sales (Billboard) | 25 |
| US Hot Rock & Alternative Songs (Billboard) | 19 |
| US Rock & Alternative Airplay (Billboard) | 12 |

=== Year-end charts ===
Year-end chart performance for "Voices in My Head"
| Chart (2022) | Position |
|---|---|
| Germany Rock Airplay (Official German Charts) | 14 |
| US Hot Rock & Alternative Songs (Billboard) | 46 |

== Certifications ==
Certifications for "Voices in My Head"
| Region | Certification | Certified units/sales |
|---|---|---|
| United States (RIAA) | Gold | 500,000^{‡} |
^{‡} Sales+streaming figures based on certification alone.
