= Watch the World Burn =

2023 single by Falling in Reverse

Single by Falling in Reverse

from the album Popular Monster
- Released: January 31, 2023
- Recorded: 2022
- Genre: Hip-hop; metalcore
- Length: 3:24
- Label: Epitaph
- Songwriters: Ronald Joseph Radke; Tyler Smyth; Cody Quistad; Christian Thompson; Tyler Burgess
- Producers: Tyler Smyth; Ronnie Radke

Falling in Reverse singles chronology
"Voices in My Head" (2022)	"Watch the World Burn" (2023)	"Last Resort (Reimagined)" (2023)

Music video
- "Watch the World Burn" on YouTube

"Watch the World Burn" is a song by American rock band Falling in Reverse. It was released on January 31, 2023, through Epitaph Records. It was released as a standalone single and was later included on their fifth studio album Popular Monster.

== Promotion and release ==
In early January 2023, vocalist Ronnie Radke changed his social media profile photo to a photo of planet Earth on fire. The band finally released the single on January 31, 2023, thus being the third single from their upcoming EP Neon Zombie. That same day the band had a presentation on their "ROCKZILLA" tour with Papa Roach, the band presented the song live for the first time. But the band later never announced any preview or estimated date for the EP.

On May 7, 2024 the band released the single "Ronald" and after 7 years of the release of their fourth studio album Coming Home, the band finally announced that they would be releasing their fifth studio album called Popular Monster and it was released on August 16, 2024.

== Composition and lyrics ==
"Watch the World Burn" begins as a dramatic, Eminem-influenced hip-hop song before building into a metalcore chorus and breakdown in the second half. The song was produced by Ronnie Radke and DangerKids vocalist Tyler Smyth, which they composed alongside Wage War guitarist Cody Quistad and FIR members Christian Thompson and Tyler Burgess. Throughout the song, Radke makes references to succeeding despite his inner struggles and outside disputes with critics and other musicians, such as being made fun of for having to cancel a show after having laptops stolen, and compares himself to a supervillain while also hinting at having information about public figures that he's withholding ("I got dirt on people but they act like I don't know, yeah"). The song's finale encourages listeners to indulge their inner villains as well ("The fear is what keeps you alive/Break the fucking chains, take back your life").

== Commercial performance ==
"Watch the World Burn" achieved immediate success shortly after its release, the song managed to position itself on prominent music charts, debuting for the first time at number 95 on the UK Singles chart, the most important in the United Kingdom. It also managed to debut for the first time on the main Canadian chart at number 77 on Billboard Canadian Hot 100 chart. The single made the band debut for the first time on the Billboard Hot 100 chart, and peaked at number 83.

== Music video ==
The music video was released the same day the single was released and was directed by Jensen Noen. In the video, Radke portrays a supervillain character inspired by Homelander from The Boys and Injustice: Gods Among Us, first skydiving from an exploding airplane and landing in a city street surrounded by cameras, then giving a speech to an army inspired by General Hux's speech in Star Wars: The Force Awakens. Radke then has a rap duet with a version of himself in demonic makeup before appearing in a church and using his powers to first set a priest on fire and then kill the churchgoers before setting the entire planet aflame.

During the video, a lookalike of ex-Skid Row vocalist Sebastian Bach is struck in the head by laptops raining down on him from above, as a reference to Bach insulting Radke on Twitter regarding Falling in Reverse being forced to cancel a show because some of their laptops were stolen. The video reached one million views on the first day on YouTube and reached number one in global trends.

== Personnel ==
Credits adapted from Genius.

Falling in Reverse

- Ronnie Radke – vocals, programming, producer, keyboard, composer
- Max Georgiev – lead guitar, backing vocals
- Christian Thompson – rhythm guitar, backing vocals, composer, writer
- Luke Holland – drums, percussion
- Tyler Burgess – bass, backing vocals, composer, writer

Additional personnel

- Tyler Smyth – producer, strings, writer, recording, mixing, mastering, programming, engineered
- Charles Kallaghan Massabo – producer, engineerd, vocal producer, beat instrumental
- Cody Quistad – writer, composer, additional guitar

== Charts ==
=== Weekly charts ===
Weekly chart performance for "Watch the World Burn"
Chart (2023)	Peak position
Australia Digital Tracks (ARIA)	25
Canada Hot 100 (Billboard)	77
France Digital Songs (SNEP)	25
Germany Rock Airplay (Official German Charts)	1
Global 200 (Billboard)	149
Hungary (Single Top 40)	38
New Zealand Hot Singles (RMNZ)	16
UK Singles (Official Charts)	95
UK Indie (Official Charts)	32
US Billboard Hot 100	83
US Hot Rock & Alternative Songs (Billboard)	8
US Rock & Alternative Airplay (Billboard)	41

=== Year-end charts ===
Year-end chart performance for "Watch the World Burn"
Chart (2023)	Position
Germany Rock Airplay (Official German Charts)	2
US Hot Rock & Alternative Songs (Billboard)	50

== Certifications ==
Region	Certification	Certified units/sales
United Kingdom (BPI)	Silver	200,000^{‡}
United States (RIAA)	Gold	500,000^{‡}
^{‡} Sales+streaming figures based on certification alone.
