= All My Life (Falling in Reverse song) =

2024 single by Falling in Reverse featuring Jelly Roll

Single by Falling in Reverse featuring Jelly Roll

from the album Popular Monster
- Released: June 6, 2024
- Recorded: 2023
- Genre: Country rock; post-hardcore; easycore
- Length: 3:11
- Label: Epitaph
- Songwriters: Ronald Radke; Tyler Smyth; Jason DeFord; Cody Quistad; Jeris Johnson
- Producers: Tyler Smyth; Ronnie Radke; Charles Kallaghan Massabo

Falling in Reverse singles chronology
"Ronald" (2024)	"All My Life" (2024)	"Prequel" (2024)

Jelly Roll singles chronology
"Trailer in the Sky" (2024)	"All My Life" (2024)	"I Am Not Okay" (2024)

Music video
- "All My Life" on YouTube

"All My Life" is song by American rock band Falling in Reverse featuring American country singer Jelly Roll. It was released on June 6, 2024, through Epitaph Records. The song was released as the second single from the band's fifth studio album, Popular Monster.

== Promotion and release ==
Following the announcement of their fifth studio album, Popular Monster, the band announced that some of their songs that were released without an album will be added to the album. On June 6, 2024, the band released their seventh single for their album, "All My Life", in collaboration with country singer Jelly Roll; the song was a surprise to fans because of the country sound of the song.

A UK tour was also announced with Hollywood Undead, Tech N9ne and Slaughter to Prevail. Tickets for the UK tour sold out quickly, so the band opened more dates. In 2024, "All My Life" was nominated for the 2024 Billboard Music Awards in the category Top Hard Rock Song, the song was the winner of the award. In 2025, "All My Life" was nominated for the 2025 iHeartRadio Music Awards in the category Rock Song of the Year.

== Composition and lyrics ==
The song was written by vocalist Ronnie Radke, Tyler Smyth, Jelly Roll, Wage War guitarist Cody Quistad and singer and rapper Jeris Johnson and was composed by Ronnie Radke and Tyler Smyth. It was produced again by Tyler Smyth, Ronnie Radke and Charles Kallaghan Massabo.

The song features a mixture of elements of hard rock and country.

== Commercial performance ==
The song quickly began to trend on YouTube, reaching number one in the United States. The band even released a promotional video with YouTube Music. The song reached number one on the Billboard Rock charts. This is the band's second song to enter Billboard Hot 100 chart, debuting at number 77.

== Music video ==
The music video was directed by Jensen Noen. The music video features the participation of transgender influencers Blaire White and Gabbi Tuft (the latter was a wrestler known as Tyler Reks in WWE). AEW wrestler Saraya (known as Paige in WWE), Jelly Roll's girlfriend Bunnie Xo, Saraya's brother and AEW wrestler Zak Zodiac, and Bad Religion guitarist and owner of Epitaph Records, Brett Gurewitz, also make appearances in the video.

The music video features Radke going down to a Wild West town, freeing his partner (Jelly Roll) from jail, and fighting the sheriff (Blaire White) as they both rob the town bank.

== Personnel ==
Credits adapted from Genius.

Falling in Reverse

- Ronnie Radke – lead vocals, programming, producer, writer, composer, keyboards
- Max Georgiev – lead guitar, backing vocals
- Christian Thompson – rhythm guitar, backing vocals
- Luke Holland – drums, percussion
- Tyler Burgess – bass, backing vocals

Additional personnel

- Jelly Roll – guest vocals, writer
- Tyler Smyth – producer, strings, additional writer, recording, mixing, mastering, programming, engineered, composer
- Charles Kallaghan Massabo – producer, engineerd, vocal producer
- Jeris Johnson – writer, composer
- Cody Quistad – writer, composer, guitar

== Charts ==
=== Weekly charts ===
Weekly chart performance for "All My Life"
Chart (2024)	Peak position
Australia Digital Tracks (ARIA)	17
Bolivia Anglo Airplay (Monitor Latino)	12
Canada Digital Songs (Billboard)	17
Canada Rock (Billboard)	40
Germany Airplay (TopHit)	38
Germany Alternative Singles (GfK)	6
Italy Rock Airplay (FIMI)	17
New Zealand Hot Singles (RMNZ)	24
UK Singles Sales (OCC)	51
UK Singles Downloads (Official Charts)	48
UK Independent Singles Breakers (OCC)	13
UK Rock & Metal (Official Charts)	21
US Billboard Hot 100	77
US Hot Rock & Alternative Songs (Billboard)	14
US Adult Pop Airplay (Billboard)	33
US Pop Airplay (Billboard)	38
US Rock & Alternative Airplay (Billboard)	5

=== Year-end charts ===
Year-end chart performance for "All My Life"
Chart (2024)	Position
US Hot Rock & Alternative Songs (Billboard)	66
US Rock Airplay (Billboard)	26

Year-end chart performance for "All My Life"
Chart (2025)	Position
Canada Mainstream Rock (Billboard)	66

== Awards and nominees ==
Year	Award	Result	Ref
2024	Billboard Music Awards: Top Hard Rock Songs	Won	
2025	iHeartRadio Music Awards: Rock Song Of The Year	Nominated	

== See also ==
- List of Billboard Mainstream Rock number-one songs of the 2020s
