= Zombified =

2022 single by Falling in Reverse

Single by Falling in Reverse

from the album Popular Monster
- Released: January 5, 2022
- Length: 3:40
- Label: Epitaph
- Songwriters: Ronald Joseph Radke; Jon Lundin; Cody Quistad
- Producers: Tyler Smyth; Ronnie Radke

Falling in Reverse singles chronology
"I'm Not a Vampire (Revamped)" (2021)	"Zombified" (2022)	"Voices in My Head" (2022)

Music video
- "Zombified" on YouTube

"Zombified" is a song by American rock band Falling in Reverse. It was released on January 5, 2022, through Epitaph Records. It was released as a standalone single and was later included on their fifth studio album Popular Monster. The song was again produced by DangerKids vocalist Tyler Smyth and Ronnie Radke.

== Promotion and release ==
At the end of 2021, vocalist Ronnie Radke published images through Instagram that showed indication of an upcoming song. On January 4, 2022, the band announced on their social networks that there would be a live broadcast on Radke's Twitch channel the following day. The song was released on January 5, via live stream. It is the first single from their upcoming Neon Zombie EP. But the band later never announced any preview or estimated date for the EP.

On May 7, 2024 the band released the single "Ronald" and after 7 years of the release of their fourth studio album Coming Home, the band finally announced that they would be releasing their fifth studio album called Popular Monster and it will be released on August 16, 2024.

== Composition and lyrics ==
"Zombified" is a song written by Ronnie Radke, John Lundin, and Cody Quistad. The song's lyrics are a stand against cancel culture, wherein celebrities or popular online personalities get "cancelled" for certain actions, regardless of how long ago said actions were, and whether or not the offender had changed as a person. The song was composed by Ronnie Radke with a "rock anthem" influence. About this single Ronnie explains why he wrote the song:

I wrote "Zombified" about how sensitive society has gotten, in my opinion. I think we all need to learn to laugh a little more. I pulled out all the stops for the "Zombified" video, for the fans, YouTube reactors, and all people alike.

== Music video ==
The music video for the song was directed by Jensen Noen who had already directed the band's music videos for other songs such as "Popular Monster", "The Drug in Me Is Reimagined", and "I'm Not a Vampire (Revamped)". The music video shows Falling in Reverse fending off against zombies in a post apocalyptic world. The music video won Best of Festival - Music Video at the 2022 Richmond International Film Festival.

== In popular culture ==
Radke's former partner and professional wrestler Saraya was reported in 2022 as using "Zombified" as her entrance music in All Elite Wrestling.

== Personnel ==
Falling in Reverse

- Ronnie Radke – lead vocals, programming, producer, additional guitar
- Max Georgiev – lead guitar, backing vocals
- Christian Thompson – rhythm guitar, backing vocals
- Luke Holland – drums, percussion
- Wes Horton – bass, backing vocals

Additional personnel

- Tyler Smyth – production, strings, additional writer, recording, mastering, programming, engineered
- Cody Quistad – additional writer, guitars
- Jon Lundin – composition

== Charts ==
=== Weekly charts ===
Weekly chart performance for "Zombified"
Chart (2022)	Peak position
Australia Digital Tracks (ARIA)	33
Canada Rock (Billboard)	31
Canada Digital Songs (Billboard)	26
Finland (Suomen virallinen lista)	67
Germany Rock Airplay (Official German Charts)	11
New Zealand Hot Singles (RMNZ)	34
UK Singles Downloads (OCC)	59
UK Rock & Metal (OCC)	12
UK Singles Sales (OCC)	60
US Digital Song Sales (Billboard)	35
US Hot Rock & Alternative Songs (Billboard)	16
US Rock & Alternative Airplay (Billboard)	12

=== Year-end charts ===
Year-end chart performance for "Zombified"
Chart (2022)	Peak position
US Hot Rock & Alternative Songs (Billboard)	48
US Rock Airplay (Billboard)	40

== Certifications ==
Certifications for "Zombified"
Region	Certification	Certified units/sales
United States (RIAA)	Gold	500,000^{‡}
^{‡} Sales+streaming figures based on certification alone.

== See also ==
- List of Billboard Mainstream Rock number-one songs of the 2020s
