= Popular Monster =

Popular Monster may refer to:

- Popular Monster (album), 2024 studio album by American rock band Falling in Reverse
- "Popular Monster" (song), 2019 song by Falling in Reverse and the title track of the album
