= Popular Monster (song) =

2019 single by Falling in Reverse

Single by Falling in Reverse

from the album Popular Monster
- Released: November 20, 2019
- Recorded: 2018
- Studio: Movie
- Genre: Post-hardcore; metalcore; alternative metal; rap metal
- Length: 3:41
- Label: Epitaph
- Songwriters: Ronald Radke; Cody Quistad; Tyler Smyth
- Producers: Tyler Smyth; Ronnie Radke

Falling in Reverse singles chronology
"Drugs" (2019)	"Popular Monster" (2019)	"The Drug in Me Is Reimagined" (2020)

Music video
- "Popular Monster" on YouTube

"Popular Monster" is a song by American rock band Falling in Reverse. It was released on November 20, 2019. The song was ranked number four in late 2019 on the US Billboard Hot Rock & Alternative Songs and number one on the US Mainstream Rock chart. The song was released as a standalone single and was later included as the title track on band's fifth studio album, Popular Monster.

== Promotion and release ==
The song was released in November 2019. On October 23, 2020, Swedish duo DJs Galantis and American DJ Nghtmre released a remix version of the song. At the end of 2020, the song was ranked number one on Octane Sirius XM as the most played rock song on the radio in the United States. On May 7, 2024 the band released the single "Ronald" and after 7 years of the release of their fourth studio album Coming Home, the band finally announced that they would be releasing their fifth studio album called Popular Monster and it will be released on August 16, 2024.

== Composition and lyrics ==
The song was composed and written by Ronnie Radke, Cody Quistad of Wage War, and Tyler Smyth of DangerKids. It talks about Ronnie Radke exploring his demons, particularly that of his depression and accusations made against him throughout his life, and eventually transforming into a werewolf. Ronnie Radke says about the song:

"'Popular Monster' is the voice inside my head, waiting for you to hear it. It is the story of a hero who has been falsely accused and destroyed by society. Show what happens when you've been pushed too hard. You become exactly what they say, you are exactly what they want you to be, a monster."

When writing the song, Ronnie Radke drew inspiration from the 2019 film Joker.

Radke continues to experiment with rap, notably with the first and second verses of the song. However, the band does not leave aside its rock roots since the pre-chorus and the choruses feature a heavy metal sound, resemblant of rap metal or nu metal. The song features a metalcore breakdown which marks that the band remains faithful to their original sound.

== Music video ==
The music video for the song was directed by Jensen Noen. The music video depicts Ronnie Radke exploring his demons in which he eventually transforms into a werewolf. This is the last music video to feature rhythm guitarist Derek Jones, who died in April 2020.

== Commercial performance ==
The song peaked at number four on the Billboard Hot Rock & Alternative Songs chart, number 15 on the Rock Airplay chart, and number one on the Mainstream Rock chart. On the Billboard Canada Rock chart, the song peaked at number 38, while on the UK Rock & Metal Singles chart, it peaked at number 17, the song debuted at number 33 in Hungary. In June 2020, Billboard introduced two new rock charts, with "Popular Monster" becoming the first song to top the Hot Hard Rock Songs chart and peaking at number 11 on the Hot Alternative Songs chart. On December 10, 2024, the song was certified 3× Platinum in the United States by the Recording Industry Association of America (RIAA) equivalent to 3,000,000 units. Later they obtained their first platinum record and has since gone triple-platinum.

== Personnel ==
Credits adapted from Tidal.

Falling in Reverse

- Ronnie Radke – lead vocals, programming, additional guitar
- Derek Jones – rhythm guitar, backing vocals
- Tyler Burgess – bass, backing vocals
- Max Georgiev – lead guitar, backing vocals
- Johnny Mele – drums, percussion, backing vocals

Additional personnel

- Ronnie Radke – production
- Tyler Smyth – production, strings, additional writing, recording, mastering, programming, engineering
- Cody Quistad – additional writing, guitars
- Kevin Ellis Moore – cover art
- Charles Kallaghan Massabo – co-production, programming, engineering, beat instrumental

== Charts ==
=== Weekly charts ===
Weekly chart performance for "Popular Monster"
Chart (2019–2020)	Peak position
Canada Rock (Billboard)	38
Hungary (Single Top 40)	33
UK Independent Singles Breakers (OCC)	11
UK Rock & Metal (OCC)	17
US Hot Rock & Alternative Songs (Billboard)	4
US Rock & Alternative Airplay (Billboard)	15

=== Year-end charts ===
Year-end chart performance for "Popular Monster"
Chart (2020)	Position
US Hot Rock & Alternative Songs (Billboard)	19

== Certifications ==
Certifications for "Popular Monster"
Region	Certification	Certified units/sales
Australia (ARIA)	3× Platinum	210,000^{‡}
New Zealand (RMNZ)	Gold	15,000^{‡}
United Kingdom (BPI)	Gold	400,000^{‡}
United States (RIAA)	3× Platinum	3,000,000^{‡}
^{‡} Sales+streaming figures based on certification alone.

== In popular culture ==
In 2020, the song was included in a DLC of the video game Rock Band 4.

== See also ==
- List of Billboard Mainstream Rock number-one songs of the 2020s
