= Superhero (Falling in Reverse song) =

2017 single by Falling in Reverse

Single by Falling in Reverse

from the album Coming Home
- Released: July 10, 2017
- Length: 3:14
- Label: Epitaph
- Songwriters: Ronald Radke; Christian Thompson; Stephen Aiello
- Producer: Michael "Elvis" Baskette

Falling in Reverse singles chronology
"Broken" (2017)	"Superhero" (2017)	"Fuck You and All Your Friends" (2017)

Music video
- "Superhero" on YouTube

"Superhero" is a song by American rock band Falling in Reverse. It was released on July 10, 2017. It was released as the fourth single from Falling in Reverse's fourth studio album, Coming Home.

== Background ==
The single was written by Ronnie Radke, Christian Thompson and Stevie Aiello. The song is about a boy who cannot save the world if he cannot even save himself. The music video for the song is inspired by the Netflix series, "Stranger Things", and shows three children who suffer abuse and harassment by friends and family, come together to escape from this planet.

== Personnel ==
- Ronnie Radke — lead vocals, production
- Derek Jones — rhythm guitar, backing vocals
- Ryan Seaman — drums, percussion, backing vocals
- Zakk Sandler — bass, backing vocals
- Christian Thompson — lead guitar, backing vocals

== Charts ==
Chart (2018)	Peak position
US Mainstream Rock (Billboard)	22
