= Popular MonsTOUR II: World Domination =

2024–25 concert tour by Falling in Reverse

- World tour by Falling in Reverse
- Promotional poster for select UK dates of the tour, which were later cancelled.
- Location: Australia; Europe; North America
- Associated album: Popular Monster
- Start date: August 18, 2024
- End date: March 18, 2025
- Legs: 3
- No. of shows: 44
- Supporting acts: Asking Alexandria; Black Veil Brides; Dance Gavin Dance; Hollywood Undead; Nathan James; Jeris Johnson; Tech N9ne

Falling in Reverse concert chronology
- Popular MonsTOUR (2023); Popular MonsTOUR II: World Domination (2024–2025)

Popular MonsTOUR II: World Domination was a concert tour by American rock band Falling in Reverse, launched in support of their fifth studio album Popular Monster. The tour began on August 18, 2024, in Nampa, Idaho and concluded on March 18, 2025, in Brisbane, Australia.

The UK and Ireland dates of the European leg of Falling in Reverse's tour were canceled after the band's lead vocalist, Ronnie Radke, was denied entry into the United Kingdom by the Home Office. The decision stemmed from Radke's 2008 conviction for battery, for which he served time in prison. Despite having completed his sentence and maintaining an active touring schedule internationally in recent years, UK immigration laws regarding prior criminal convictions resulted in the denial of his visa application. The shows were to be the band's first appearances in the UK.

== Tour dates ==
List of 2024 concerts, showing date, city, country, venue and opening acts
| Date | City | Country | Venue | Opening acts |
|---|---|---|---|---|
| August 18, 2024 | Nampa | United States | Ford Idaho Center | Black Veil Brides; Dance Gavin Dance; Nathan James; Tech N9ne |
| August 21, 2024 | Airway Heights | United States | Northern Quest Amphitheater | Black Veil Brides; Dance Gavin Dance; Nathan James; Tech N9ne |
| August 22, 2024 | Auburn | United States | White River Amphitheatre | Black Veil Brides; Dance Gavin Dance; Nathan James; Tech N9ne |
| August 23, 2024 | Ridgefield | United States | RV Inn Style Resorts Amphitheater | Black Veil Brides; Dance Gavin Dance; Nathan James; Tech N9ne |
| August 25, 2024 | Salt Lake City | United States | Utah First Credit Union Amphitheatre | Black Veil Brides; Dance Gavin Dance; Nathan James; Tech N9ne |
| August 27, 2024 | Albuquerque | United States | Isleta Amphitheater | Black Veil Brides; Dance Gavin Dance; Nathan James; Tech N9ne |
| August 29, 2024 | Irving | United States | The Pavilion At Toyota Music Factory | Black Veil Brides; Dance Gavin Dance; Jeris Johnson; Tech N9ne |
| August 30, 2024 | The Woodlands | United States | Cynthia Woods Mitchell Pavilion | Black Veil Brides; Dance Gavin Dance; Jeris Johnson; Tech N9ne |
| September 1, 2024 | Alpharetta | United States | Ameris Bank Amphitheatre | Black Veil Brides; Dance Gavin Dance; Jeris Johnson; Tech N9ne |
| September 2, 2024 | Charlotte | United States | Skyla Credit Union Amphitheatre | Black Veil Brides; Dance Gavin Dance; Jeris Johnson; Tech N9ne |
| September 4, 2024 | Raleigh | United States | Red Hat Amphitheater | Black Veil Brides; Dance Gavin Dance; Jeris Johnson; Tech N9ne |
| September 6, 2024 | Bristow | United States | Jiffy Lube Live | Black Veil Brides; Dance Gavin Dance; Jeris Johnson; Tech N9ne |
| September 7, 2024 | Scranton | United States | The Pavilion at Montage Mountain | Black Veil Brides; Dance Gavin Dance; Jeris Johnson; Tech N9ne |
| September 9, 2024 | Boston | United States | Leader Bank Pavilion | Black Veil Brides; Dance Gavin Dance; Jeris Johnson; Tech N9ne |
| September 10, 2024 | Buffalo | United States | Darien Lake Amphitheater | Black Veil Brides; Dance Gavin Dance; Jeris Johnson; Tech N9ne |
| September 12, 2024 | Burgettstown | United States | The Pavilion at Star Lake | Black Veil Brides; Dance Gavin Dance; Jeris Johnson; Tech N9ne |
| September 13, 2024 | Holmdel | United States | PNC Bank Arts Center | Black Veil Brides; Dance Gavin Dance; Jeris Johnson; Tech N9ne |
| September 15, 2024 | Sterling Heights | United States | Michigan Lottery Amphitheatre | Black Veil Brides; Dance Gavin Dance; Jeris Johnson; Tech N9ne |
| September 16, 2024 | Indianapolis | United States | Everwise Amphitheater | Black Veil Brides; Dance Gavin Dance; Jeris Johnson; Tech N9ne |
| September 17, 2024 | Chicago | United States | Huntington Bank Pavilion | Black Veil Brides; Dance Gavin Dance; Jeris Johnson; Tech N9ne |
| September 20, 2024 | Franklin | United States | FirstBank Amphitheater | Black Veil Brides; Dance Gavin Dance; Jeris Johnson; Tech N9ne |
| September 21, 2024 | Maryland Heights | United States | Hollywood Casino Amphitheatre | Black Veil Brides; Dance Gavin Dance; Jeris Johnson; Tech N9ne |
| September 23, 2024 | Denver | United States | The JunkYard | Black Veil Brides; Dance Gavin Dance; Jeris Johnson; Tech N9ne |
| September 25, 2024 | Phoenix | United States | Talking Stick Resort Amphitheatre | Black Veil Brides; Dance Gavin Dance; Jeris Johnson; Tech N9ne |
| September 26, 2024 | Inglewood | United States | Kia Forum | Black Veil Brides; Dance Gavin Dance; Jeris Johnson; Tech N9ne |
| October 5, 2024 (Note: The October 5, 2024 concert is set to be a part of We Missed Ourselves Fest.) | Mexico City | Mexico | Agustín Melgar Olympic Velodrome | —N/a |
| October 13, 2024 (Note: The October 13, 2024 concert is set to be a part of Aftershock Festival.) | Sacramento | United States | Discovery Park | —N/a |
| November 7, 2024 | Lisbon | Portugal | Campo Pequeno Bullring | Hollywood Undead; Sleep Theory |
| November 10, 2024 | Madrid | Spain | Palacio Vistalegre | Hollywood Undead; Sleep Theory |
| November 11, 2024 | Barcelona | Spain | Palau Sant Jordi (Note: Originally scheduled for the Razzmatazz.) | Hollywood Undead; Sleep Theory |
| November 14, 2024 | Milan | Italy | Unipol Forum (Note: Originally scheduled for the Fabrique.) | Hollywood Undead; Sleep Theory |
| November 17, 2024 | Zürich | Switzerland | Hallenstadion (Note: Originally scheduled for the X-Tra.) | Hollywood Undead; Sleep Theory |
| November 19, 2024 | Munich | Germany | Zenith | Hollywood Undead; Sleep Theory |
| November 20, 2024 | Berlin | Germany | Velodrom (Note: Originally scheduled for the Columbiahalle.) | Hollywood Undead; Sleep Theory |
| November 22, 2024 | Prague | Czech Republic | O2 Universum | Hollywood Undead; Sleep Theory |
| November 25, 2024 | Łódź | Poland | Atlas Arena | Hollywood Undead; Sleep Theory |
| November 29, 2024 | Frankfurt (Note: Originally scheduled for Offenbach am Main) | Germany | Festhalle (Note: Originally scheduled for the Stadthalle Offenbach) | Hollywood Undead; Sleep Theory |
| December 1, 2024 | Paris | France | Accor Arena (Note: Originally scheduled for the Le Zénith) | Hollywood Undead; Sleep Theory |
| December 2, 2024 | Cologne | Germany | Lanxess Arena (Note: Originally scheduled for the Paladium) | Hollywood Undead; Sleep Theory |

List of 2025 concerts, showing date, city, country, venue and opening acts
| Date | City | Country | Venue | Opening acts |
|---|---|---|---|---|
| March 11, 2025 | Perth | Australia | RAC Arena | Black Veil Brides; Hollywood Undead |
| March 13, 2025 | Adelaide | Australia | Adelaide Entertainment Centre | Black Veil Brides; Hollywood Undead |
| March 14, 2025 | Melbourne | Australia | Rod Laver Arena | Black Veil Brides; Hollywood Undead |
| March 16, 2025 | Sydney | Australia | Qudos Bank Arena | Black Veil Brides; Hollywood Undead |
| March 18, 2025 | Brisbane | Australia | Brisbane Entertainment Centre | Black Veil Brides; Hollywood Undead |

== Cancelled shows ==
| Date | City | Country | Venue | Reason |
|---|---|---|---|---|
| November 16, 2024 | Würzburg | Germany | Posthalle | Logistical challenges |
| November 23, 2024 | Budapest | Hungary | Barba Negra | Logistical challenges |
| November 26, 2024 | Vienna | Austria | Vienna Gasometers | —N/a |
| November 28, 2024 | Tilburg | Netherlands | Poppodium 013 | Logistical challenges |
| December 4, 2024 | Manchester | England | AO Arena | Rejected visa for Radke |
| December 5, 2024 | Birmingham | England | BP Pulse Live | Rejected visa for Radke |
| December 7, 2024 | Cardiff | Wales | Utilita Arena | Rejected visa for Radke |
| December 8, 2024 | London | England | OVO Arena Wembley | Rejected visa for Radke |
| December 10, 2024 | Glasgow | Scotland | OVO Hydro | Rejected visa for Radke |
| December 12, 2024 | Dublin | Ireland | 3Arena | Rejected visa for Radke |
| December 16, 2024 | London | England | The O_{2} Arena | Rejected visa for Radke |

== Personnel ==
- Ronnie Radke – lead vocals
- Max Georgiev – lead guitar, backing vocals
- Christian Thompson – rhythm guitar, backing vocals
- Tyler Burgess – bass, lead guitar, backing vocals
- Luke Holland – drums, percussion
