= Popular Monster (album) =

2024 studio album by Falling in Reverse

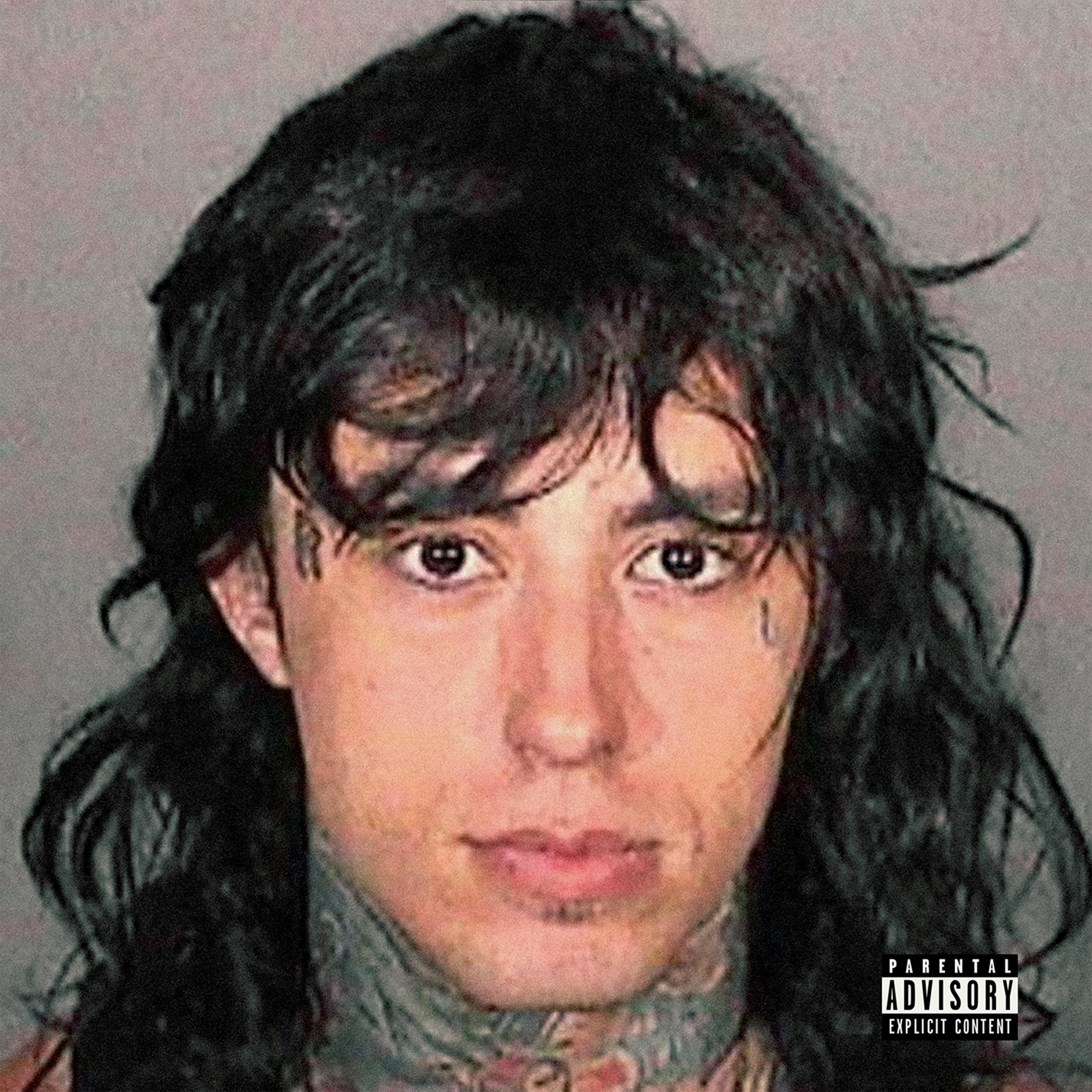

Studio album by Falling in Reverse
- Released: August 16, 2024
- Recorded: 2018–2023
- Genres: Metalcore; rap metal; pop rap; electronica
- Length: 37:48
- Label: Epitaph
- Producers: Tyler Smyth; Ronnie Radke; Charles Kallaghan Massabo

Falling in Reverse studio album chronology
Coming Home (2017)	Popular Monster (2024)

Singles from Popular Monster
- 1. "Popular Monster" Released: November 20, 2019; 2. "Zombified" Released: January 5, 2022; 3. "Voices in My Head" Released: May 31, 2022; 4. "Watch the World Burn" Released: January 31, 2023; 5. "Last Resort (Reimagined)" Released: June 26, 2023; 6. "Ronald" Released: May 7, 2024; 7. "All My Life" Released: June 6, 2024; 8. "Prequel" Released: August 16, 2024

Popular Monster is the fifth studio album by American rock band Falling in Reverse, released on August 16, 2024, through Epitaph Records.

It is the final album to feature founding guitarist Derek Jones, who played on the title track before his death in 2020. The album features guest appearances from rapper Tech N9ne, Slaughter to Prevail vocalist Alex Terrible, country singer/rapper Jelly Roll and former All Elite Wrestling and WWE wrestler Saraya Bevis (Paige).

While it is the band's first album in seven years, it features singles that were originally released dating back to 2019.

The album cover features frontman Ronnie Radke's mugshot after being arrested for domestic assault in 2012.

== Background ==
After Falling in Reverse's fourth album, 2017's Coming Home, underperformed and "tanked" according to Ronnie Radke, he decided to focus on releasing singles instead of albums. This move was inspired by Drake, and Radke said that he could spend more time writing songs before releasing them now.

On May 7, 2024, the band announced their fifth album, Popular Monster, after releasing several singles throughout the last five years which eventually made it into the album. It was originally scheduled for a July 26, 2024, release date before being pushed back to August 16.

The first single which eventually made it onto Popular Monster was the title track, which was released on November 20, 2019, and became the band's first platinum single as well as their first No. 1 single on Billboard's Mainstream Rock airplay chart. "Popular Monster" was the last song that founding rhythm guitarist Derek Jones played on before his sudden death on April 21, 2020, from a subdural hematoma.

In 2022, Falling in Reverse released the singles "Zombified", written about "how sensitive society has gotten" and "Voices in My Head", which was initially interpreted as a diss against Machine Gun Kelly before Radke said those claims were false. On January 31, 2023, the band released "Watch the World Burn", Falling in Reverse's first single to enter the Billboard Hot 100, doing so at No. 83. On June 26, 2023, the band released "Last Resort (Reimagined)", a symphonic cover of the Papa Roach song. Papa Roach vocalist, Jacoby Shaddix was 'blown away' and very impressed with the cover.

On May 7, 2024, the band released the album's true lead single titled "Ronald", which featured rapper Tech N9ne and Slaughter to Prevail vocalist Alex Terrible. The band also announced the Popular MonsTOUR II: World Domination, which took place from August–December 2024, with guests Tech N9ne, Slaughter to Prevail, Hollywood Undead, Dance Gavin Dance and Black Veil Brides. However, the band's December 2024 UK tour was canceled because Radke was denied entry into the country over his prison sentence. On June 6, 2024, the band released the album's second single, titled "All My Life", which featured country singer Jelly Roll; the single received one million views on YouTube in the first 24 hours of its release. A music video for the track "Prequel" was released on August 16, 2024, coinciding with the album release.

== Critical reception ==
Professional ratings
Review scores
Source	Rating
AllMusic	2.5/5 stars
Blabbermouth	8/10
Sputnikmusic	3.3/5
Still Listening	0/100
Wallofsoundau.com	6.5/10

Popular Monster received mixed reviews from critics. Anne Erickson of Blabbermouth gave it a rating of 8 out of 10 saying: "On Popular Monster, Radke and Falling in Reverse show they're trendsetters. This release is like nothing else out there in the metalcore and post-hardcore world. Their experimentation is similar to bands such as Bad Omens and Sleep Token in their unapologetic moves to meld pop and rap with metal. Falling in Reverse truly have a sound that's all their own, and that's a treasure." Simon K. over at Sputnikmusic gave the album a 3.3 out of 5, stating that "On paper, Popular Monster reads like an incoherent, schizophrenic mess, bursting at the seams with surface level influences from an eclectic range of genres and styles, all haphazardly stitched together with a derivative breakdown[...] However, there's a metaphysical element that adheres this Frankenstein's monster of ideas and makes it all extremely fun and engaging to listen to." Paul Brown of Wall of Sound gave it a rating of 6.5 out of 10 saying: "Popular Monster will get you moshing while questioning the world around you. A concept album for the rise of a glorified rolling stone." AllMusic also gave the album a rating of two and a half stars and noted the album continuing the band's "usual mash-up of metalcore, pop, rap, and electronica".

However, there were some critical reviews for the album. Luke Nutail of The Soundboard compared Radke to Tom MacDonald, saying: "The best that Falling In Reverse can aspire to on Popular Monster is copying another grifter also better known for an insufferable public persona well above any music." Rachel Aimee of Still Listening Magazine gave it a rating of zero, the lowest of all, saying: "It is baffling and decently depressing that a band like Falling in Reverse still have a platform, and a big one at that."

Loudwire ranked it as the 3rd best rock album of 2024.

== Commercial performance ==
Popular Monster debuted number 12 on the US Billboard 200, selling 31,000 units in the first week of release. The album also debuted atop the Billboard Hard Rock Albums chart. Considering the hype surrounding the release, the record itself has already accumulated 723,000 album equivalent units in the US, with 1.96 billion streams globally. The album was certified gold by the RIAA in the US. In 2024, Popular Monster was nominated for the 2024 Billboard Music Awards in the category Top Hard Rock Albums. In February 2025, the album had already sold 892,000 copies in US.

== Track listing ==
Popular Monster track listing
No.	Title	Lyrics	Music	Producer(s)	Length
1.	"Prequel"	Ronnie Radke; Tyler Smyth	Radke; Max Georgiev; Christian Thompson; Tyler Burgess; Luke Holland; Smyth	Radke; Smyth; Charles Kallaghan Massabo^{[a]}	3:53
2.	"Popular Monster"	Radke; Cody Quistad; Smyth	Radke; Georgiev; Derek Jones; Burgess; Johnny Mele; Smyth; Quistad	Radke; Smyth; Massabo^{[c]}	3:40
3.	"All My Life" (featuring Jelly Roll)	Radke; Jason DeFord; Jeris Johnson; Quistad; Smyth	Radke; Georgiev; Thompson; Burgess; Holland; Johnson; DeFord; Quistad; Smyth	Radke; Smyth; Massabo	3:10
4.	"Ronald" (featuring Tech N9ne and Alex Terrible)	Radke; Jason Richardson; Aaron Dontez Yates; Holland; Smyth	Radke; Georgiev; Thompson; Burgess; Holland; Richardson; Yates; Alexander Shikolai; Smyth	Radke; Smyth; Massabo	3:16
5.	"Voices in My Head"	Radke; Massabo; Quistad; Smyth	Radke; Georgiev; Thompson; Burgess; Holland; Quistad; Smyth	Radke; Smyth; Massabo	3:17
6.	"Bad Guy" (featuring Saraya Bevis)	Radke; Saraya Bevis; Smyth	Radke; Georgiev; Thompson; Burgess; Holland; Bevis; Smyth	Radke; Smyth; Massabo^{[a]}	2:37
7.	"Watch the World Burn"	Radke; Quistad; Smyth; Thompson; Burgess	Radke; Georgiev; Thompson; Burgess; Holland; Quistad; Smyth; Massabo	Radke; Smyth; Massabo	3:23
8.	"Trigger Warning"	Radke; Jon Lundin	Radke; Georgiev; Thompson; Burgess; Holland; Smyth	Radke; Smyth; Lundin^{[a]}	2:22
9.	"Zombified"	Radke; Lundin; Quistad	Radke; Georgiev; Thompson; Wes Horton; Holland; Quistad; Smyth	Radke; Smyth	3:38
10.	"No Fear"	Radke; Smyth	Radke; Smyth	Radke; Smyth	3:48
11.	"Last Resort (Reimagined)" (Papa Roach cover)	Jacoby Shaddix	Tobin Esperance	Radke; Smyth	4:43
Total length:					37:47

Japanese Edition bonus track
No.	Title	Length
12.	"Carry On"	4:55
Total length:		42:43

Notes

- ^{^[c]} signifies a co-producer
- ^{^[a]} signifies an assistant producer

== Personnel ==
Falling in Reverse

- Ronnie Radke – lead vocals, programming, production
- Derek Jones – rhythm guitar, backing vocals (track 2)
- Max Georgiev – lead guitar, backing vocals (except 11)
- Christian Thompson – rhythm guitar, backing vocals (all tracks except track 2 and 11)
- Tyler Burgess – bass, backing vocals (all tracks except track 9 and 11)
- Luke Holland – drums, percussion (all tracks except track 2 and 11)

Additional musicians

- Johnny Mele – drums, percussion, backing vocals (track 2)
- Jelly Roll – guest vocals (track 3)
- Tech N9ne – guest vocals (track 4)
- Alex Terrible – guest vocals (track 4)
- Saraya Bevis – guest vocals (track 6)
- Wes Horton – bass, backing vocals (track 9)

Additional personnel

- Tyler Smyth – strings, recording, mixing, mastering, programming, engineering
- Charles Kallaghan Massabo – programming, engineering, beats, vocal production, mastering
- Cody Quistad – guitar
- Sean Rooney – arrangement, orchestra, piano (track 11)
- Jason Richardson – guitars
- Joey Doherty – production assistance
- Ted Jensen – mastering
- Brett Gurewitz – art direction
- Johnny Roper – additional drums

== Charts ==
=== Weekly charts ===
Weekly chart performance for Popular Monster
Chart (2024–2025)	Peak position
Australian Albums (ARIA)	7
Austrian Albums (Ö3 Austria)	2
Belgian Albums (Ultratop Flanders)	48
Belgian Albums (Ultratop Wallonia)	21
Canadian Albums (Billboard)	43
Dutch Albums (Album Top 100)	42
Finnish Albums (Suomen virallinen lista)	28
French Albums (SNEP)	35
French Rock & Metal Albums (SNEP)	7
German Albums (Offizielle Top 100)	10
German Rock & Metal Albums (Offizielle Top 100)	14
Hungarian Albums (MAHASZ)	37
New Zealand Albums (RMNZ)	28
Portuguese Albums (AFP)	95
Scottish Albums (Official Charts)	12
Spanish Albums (Promusicae)	59
Swedish Hard Rock Albums (Sverigetopplistan)	8
Swiss Albums (Schweizer Hitparade)	9
UK Albums (Official Charts)	29
UK Independent Albums (Official Charts)	5
UK Rock & Metal Albums (Official Charts)	2
US Billboard 200	12
US Top Hard Rock Albums (Billboard)	1
US Independent Albums (Billboard)	1
US Top Rock & Alternative Albums (Billboard)	5

=== Year-end charts ===
Year-end chart performance for Popular Monster
Chart (2024)	Position
US Top Alternative Albums (Billboard)	36
US Top Hard Rock Albums (Billboard)	26
US Top Rock Albums (Billboard)	45

== Certifications ==
Certifications for Popular Monster
Region	Certification	Certified units/sales
Australia (ARIA)	Gold	35,000^{‡}
United Kingdom (BPI)	Silver	60,000^{‡}
United States (RIAA)	Gold	500,000^{‡} / 892,000
^{‡} Sales+streaming figures based on certification alone.

== Awards and nominees ==
Year	Award	Result	Ref
2024	Billboard Music Awards: Top Hard Rock Albums	Nominated	
