= Last Resort (song) =

2000 single by Papa Roach

Single by Papa Roach

from the album Ready to Rumble soundtrack and Infest
- Released: March 7, 2000
- Genre: Nu metal; rap metal
- Length: 3:20
- Label: DreamWorks
- Songwriters: Jacoby Shaddix; Tobin Esperance
- Producer: Jay Baumgardner

Papa Roach singles chronology
| "Last Resort" (2000) | "Broken Home" (2001) |

Music video
- "Last Resort" on YouTube

"Last Resort" is a song by American rock band Papa Roach. It first appeared on the soundtrack to the 2000 film Ready to Rumble and appeared on Papa Roach's second studio album, Infest, shortly after. "Last Resort" was released as the album's lead single and the band's debut single on March 7, 2000.

Following its release, "Last Resort" topped the US Billboard Modern Rock Tracks chart for seven weeks and reached number 57 on the Billboard Hot 100. Worldwide, it became a top-10 hit in Austria, the Dominican Republic, Germany, Portugal, and the United Kingdom. The song is considered to have defined nu metal in the 2000s and is considered by many to be among the genre's greatest tracks.

== Composition ==
=== Music ===
"Last Resort" has been described as nu metal and rap metal. Bassist Tobin Esperance said: "I've written songs on piano – actually, 'Last Resort' with that whole little riff/melody thing, that's done on the piano. And then I just transferred it to the guitar." Speaking about the making of and inspiration behind the song, Esperance said:

Well, of course at the time we were listening to a lot of Wu Tang Clan, a lot of hip-hop, and a lot of Fugees and a lot of East Coast hip-hop, and we were sampling classical music behind simple pocket grooves. I was playing something on piano and Jacoby came in and started scatting over it. And we just did our typical mixing of a funky kind of hip-hop groove with a punk rock chorus. And that song just came together like that. Jacoby said, "That's a cool riff, keep playing that noodle" – we called it a noodle. We did it over and over again, and Jacoby put his lyrics to it, and the song just morphed into what it is now. No one ever thought it was going to be a huge, huge hit, but I guess you never expect anything, really, when you're first starting out.

=== Lyrics ===
"Last Resort" is about a person’s thoughts of committing suicide. In an interview with Songfacts, Papa Roach member Tobin Esperance spoke about the song and its lyrics, saying:

I think the lyrics had a lot to do with it. Because originally the song was about a friend of ours that we grew up with, and he was going through a rough time in his life. And there was that suicide element to it, just like growing up and the struggles of life and questioning whether or not you want to keep going on, and I think a lot of people connected with that. For the kids who had also gone through those kinds of feelings, those kinds of emotions, the lyrics really helped connect with that song.

Papa Roach vocalist Jacoby Shaddix described the song as a "cry for help". He also said "That song was about one of my best friends, and then 12–13 years later, that song was about me. I found myself in that place, where I was like, 'I can't go on this way. I can't do it anymore.'" Shaddix said that "Last Resort" is about a roommate he had who tried to commit suicide. Shaddix then said: "We caught him and took him to the hospital and he went into a mental facility and then he came out the other side better. He actually found God through the process, which was kind of crazy. So he's on a whole different path of his life now, which is cool. I'm really proud of him for the changes he's made in his life."

== Commercial performance ==
"Last Resort" achieved mainstream success, peaking at number one on the US Billboard Modern Rock Tracks chart in August 2000 and number 57 on the Billboard Hot 100 in December 2000. The popularity of "Last Resort" helped Papa Roach's album Infest to become certified 4× Platinum by the Recording Industry Association of America (RIAA) in December 2024. The song itself was certified 6× Platinum by the RIAA on December 6, 2024.

== Music video ==
The music video was directed by Marcos Siega. In the music video, the band performs on a floor surrounded by fans. Throughout the video, the camera zooms in on some fans near the stage and shows them in places that appear to be their rooms. The purpose was to show the people being taken from where they did not want to be to where they did – from lonely despair to the rock show where they could have fun with their friends. There are many posters for radio station 98 Rock. This is the rock station out of Sacramento, California that the band credits for jump-starting their career. Inside the Infest album booklet are thanks to DJs of the radio station. About five hundred people, including local fans, came to the shooting of the music video for "Last Resort".

== Impact and recognition ==
According to Screen Rant, "Last Resort" helped bring the nu metal genre to a wider audience. The song has since become a popular internet meme. American screenwriter Justin Halpern wrote: "It's the perfect joke, that song. The punchline hits the moment you press play. It's a comedy writer's dream." Among the first of these memes was the altered lyric, "Cut my life into pizza / This is my plastic fork." In 2018, the band ran a line of T-shirts bearing reference to this meme, accompanied by an image of a pizza.

One year earlier in 2017, Spin wrote: "The major reason why 'Last Resort' endures is that the members of Papa Roach perfectly capture what it’s like to be at a breaking point. They’re fed up with feeling miserable; tired of hating themselves; wrecked with grief over losing parents; and literally crying out for help."

Papa Roach frontman Jacoby Shaddix is quoted as follows regarding his feelings towards the song's impact on popular culture in 2022: "It's everywhere, dude. It's even in my house, with my kids. It's funny, dude. [...] You could be at a bar mitzvah and drop that song and somebody there would be, like, 'That's my fucking jam.' Or I could be at TSA fucking airport security, and [someone will be like], 'Are you the 'cut my life...?' And I'm, like, 'I am the 'cut my life into pizza' guy. That's right, dude. Let's go.' I'll be that guy."

In 2025, American actor John Stamos made headlines when he drummed along to the song without having ever heard it before in his life. That same year, Carrie Underwood joined the band onstage to perform the song during a performance in Las Vegas.

In 2026, Metal Injection stated the opinion that it is difficult or impossible to find someone who has never heard the song.

In 2026, the song was referenced as a parody featuring lyrics about the Iran War in Saturday Night Live’s March performance with Colin Jost as Pete Hegseth.

== Track listings ==
US CD single and European maxi-CD single
| No. | Title | Length |
|---|---|---|
| 1. | "Last Resort" (LP version) |
| 2. | "Legacy" (clean album version) |
| 3. | "Dead Cell" (live) |
| 4. | "Infest" (LP version) |

UK CD1
| No. | Title | Length |
|---|---|---|
| 1. | "Last Resort" | 3:20 |
| 2. | "Broken Home" (Live Radio 1 Evening Session) | 3:46 |
| 3. | "Dead Cell" (Live Radio 1 Evening Session) | 3:08 |
| 4. | "Last Resort" (CD-ROM) |

UK CD2
| No. | Title | Length |
|---|---|---|
| 1. | "Last Resort" | 3:20 |
| 2. | "Last Resort" (Live Radio 1 Evening Session) | 3:22 |
| 3. | "Between Angels and Insects" (Live Radio 1 Evening Session) | 4:21 |

UK cassette single
| No. | Title | Length |
|---|---|---|
| 1. | "Last Resort" (clean version) |
| 2. | "Broken Home" (Live Radio 1 Evening Session) |

European and Japanese CD single
| No. | Title | Length |
|---|---|---|
| 1. | "Last Resort" (LP version) |
| 2. | "Legacy" (clean album version) |

Australian CD single
| No. | Title | Length |
|---|---|---|
| 1. | "Between Angels and Insects" (explicit) |
| 2. | "Last Resort" |
| 3. | "Dead Cell" (live) |
| 4. | "Legacy" |
| 5. | "Broken Home" (enhanced video) |
| 6. | "Last Resort" (enhanced video) |

== Charts ==
=== Weekly charts ===
2000–2001 weekly chart performance for "Last Resort"
| Chart (2000–2001) | Peak position |
|---|---|
| Australia (ARIA) with "Between Angels and Insects" | 86 |
| Austria (Ö3 Austria Top 40) | 7 |
| Canada Rock/Alternative (RPM) | 15 |
| Dominican Republic (El Siglo de Torreón) | 4 |
| Europe (Eurochart Hot 100) | 11 |
| Germany (GfK) | 4 |
| Ireland (IRMA) | 13 |
| Netherlands (Dutch Top 40) | 32 |
| Netherlands (Single Top 100) | 32 |
| Portugal (AFP) | 6 |
| Scottish Singles Sales (Official Charts) | 3 |
| Switzerland (Schweizer Hitparade) | 25 |
| UK Singles (Official Charts) | 3 |
| UK Rock & Metal (Official Charts) | 1 |
| US Billboard Hot 100 | 57 |
| US Alternative Airplay (Billboard) | 1 |
| US Mainstream Rock (Billboard) | 4 |

2021 weekly chart performance for "Last Resort"
| Chart (2021) | Peak position |
|---|---|
| US Digital Song Sales (Billboard) | 28 |
| US Hot Rock & Alternative Songs (Billboard) | 19 |

=== Year-end charts ===
2000 year-end chart performance for "Last Resort"
| Chart (2000) | Position |
|---|---|
| Germany (Media Control) | 47 |
| US Mainstream Rock Tracks (Billboard) | 10 |
| US Modern Rock Tracks (Billboard) | 2 |

2001 year-end chart performance for "Last Resort"
| Chart (2001) | Position |
|---|---|
| Ireland (IRMA) | 92 |
| UK Singles (OCC) | 95 |
| US Mainstream Rock Tracks (Billboard) | 39 |

=== Decade-end charts ===
Decade-end chart performance for "Last Resort"
| Chart (2000–2009) | Position |
|---|---|
| US Hot Rock Songs (Billboard) | 17 |

== Certifications ==
Certifications and sales for "Last Resort"
| Region | Certification | Certified units/sales |
|---|---|---|
| Brazil (Pro-Música Brasil) | Gold | 30,000^{‡} |
| Denmark (IFPI Danmark) | Platinum | 90,000^{‡} |
| Germany (BVMI) | 5× Gold | 1,500,000^{‡} |
| Italy (FIMI) | Platinum | 100,000^{‡} |
| New Zealand (RMNZ) | 4× Platinum | 120,000^{‡} |
| Spain (Promusicae) | Platinum | 60,000^{‡} |
| United Kingdom (BPI) | 2× Platinum | 1,200,000^{‡} |
| United States (RIAA) | 6× Platinum | 6,000,000^{‡} |
^{‡} Sales+streaming figures based on certification alone.

== Release history ==
Release dates and formats for "Last Resort"
| Region | Date | Format(s) | Label(s) | Ref. |
|---|---|---|---|---|
| United States | March 7, 2000 | Mainstream rock; active rock; alternative radio | DreamWorks | |
| Europe | September 18, 2000 | Maxi-CD | DreamWorks | |
| United Kingdom | February 5, 2001 | CD; cassette | DreamWorks | |
| Japan | April 18, 2001 | CD | Universal Music Japan | |
| Australia | April 30, 2001 | CD | DreamWorks | |

== Reloaded version ==
"Last Resort (Reloaded)"

Single by Papa Roach with Jeris Johnson
- Released: January 27, 2021
- Genre: Rap metal; nu metal; alternative metal
- Length: 2:17
- Label: New Noize
- Songwriters: Jacoby Shaddix; Tobin Esperance; Jeris Johnson; Alex Sacco; Dave Buckner; Jerry Horton
- Producers: Jeris Johnson; Sacco

Papa Roach singles chronology
| "The Ending" (2020) | "Last Resort (Reloaded)" (2021) | "Domination" (2021) |

Jeris Johnson singles chronology
| "Damn! (Remix)" (2020) | "Last Resort (Reloaded)" (2021) | "My Sword" (2021) |

Music video
- "Last Resort (Reloaded)" on YouTube

Over 20 years after "Last Resort" was originally released, Papa Roach recorded a new version of the song titled "Last Resort (Reloaded)" with American rapper and singer Jeris Johnson. It was released on January 27, 2021. This version showcases a different sound, this time mixing in hip-hop.

=== Promotion and release ===
In 2020, Jeris Johnson began to gain traction on TikTok and uploaded a 40-second video showing his version of "Last Resort", which subsequently went viral and was seen by Papa Roach vocalist Jacoby Shaddix. At the end of 2020, Shaddix had announced that he wanted to re-record his hits with the band in different versions. Finally, the song with Johnson was released in January 2021, receiving mixed reviews.

=== Charts ===
Weekly chart performance for "Last Resort (Reloaded)"
| Chart (2021) | Peak position |
|---|---|
| Belgium (Ultratip Bubbling Under Flanders) | 111 |
| Canada Digital Songs (Billboard) | 41 |
| US Hot Rock & Alternative Songs (Billboard) | 27 |

=== Certifications ===
Certifications for "Last Resort (Reloaded)"
| Region | Certification | Certified units/sales |
|---|---|---|
| United States (RIAA) | Gold | 500,000^{‡} |
^{‡} Sales+streaming figures based on certification alone.

== Falling in Reverse version ==
"Last Resort (Reimagined)"

Single by Falling in Reverse

from the album Popular Monster
- Released: June 26, 2023
- Recorded: 2023
- Length: 4:44
- Label: Epitaph
- Songwriters: Jacoby Shaddix; Tobin Esperance; Jerry Horton; David Buckner
- Producers: Tyler Smyth; Ronnie Radke

Falling in Reverse singles chronology
| "Watch the World Burn" (2023) | "Last Resort (Reimagined)" (2023) | "Ronald" (2024) |

Music video
- "Last Resort (Reimagined)" on YouTube

American rock band Falling in Reverse covered the song under the title "Last Resort (Reimagined)". It was released on June 26, 2023, through Epitaph Records. The song was initially released as a standalone single, and was later included on their fifth studio album Popular Monster. This version is a symphonic rendition of the original song, with the vocals being recorded by frontman Ronnie Radke, while the piano and other instruments were recorded by Sean Rooney. The music video shows Radke in an alternate world all alone, singing as buildings collapse. The song was also promoted by Papa Roach frontman Jacoby Shaddix.

=== Charts ===
Weekly chart performance for "Last Resort (Reimagined)"
| Chart (2023) | Peak position |
|---|---|
| Canada Digital Songs (Billboard) | 16 |
| France Digital Songs (SNEP) | 28 |
| Germany Rock Airplay (Official German Charts) | 1 |
| New Zealand Hot Singles (RMNZ) | 33 |
| UK Indie (Official Charts) | 40 |
| UK Singles Sales (OCC) | 39 |
| US Digital Song Sales (Billboard) | 6 |
| US Alternative Airplay (Billboard) | 34 |
| US Hot Rock & Alternative Songs (Billboard) | 13 |
| US Rock & Alternative Airplay (Billboard) | 11 |
