= Ronald (song) =

2024 single by Falling in Reverse

Single by Falling in Reverse featuring Tech N9ne and Alex Terrible

from the album Popular Monster
- Released: May 7, 2024
- Recorded: 2023
- Genre: Nu metal; rap metal; groove metal; metalcore
- Length: 3:17
- Label: Epitaph
- Songwriters: Ronald Radke; Tyler Smyth; Jason Richardson; Aaron Dontez; Alexander Shikolai; Luke Holland
- Producers: Tyler Smyth; Ronnie Radke; Charles Kallaghan Massabo

Falling in Reverse singles chronology
"Last Resort (Reimagined)" (2023)	"Ronald" (2024)	"All My Life" (2024)

Tech N9ne singles chronology
"Boomer Rang" (2024)	"Ronald" (2024)	"Drippy Drop" (2024)

Alex Terrible singles chronology
"Katyusha" (2023)	"Ronald" (2024)	"Pain Remains I: Dancing Like Flames (cover)" (2024)

Music video
- "Ronald" on YouTube

"Ronald" is a song by American rock band Falling in Reverse, featuring American rapper Tech N9ne, and Russian singer Alex Terrible of Slaughter to Prevail. It was released on May 7, 2024, through Epitaph Records, as the lead single from the band's fifth studio album Popular Monster.

== Promotion and release ==
Unlike their previous singles, the band did not promote the song in advance. On May 7, 2024, the single was suddenly released under the name "Ronald" which is the real name of vocalist Ronnie Radke. The song features American rapper Tech N9ne and Slaughter to Prevail's Alex Terrible.

On the same day as the single's release, the band announced they would be releasing their fifth studio album called Popular Monster which was originally supposed to be released on July 26, 2024, however it got pushed back to August 16, 2024. The band also announced "The Popular MonsTour II" in the United States, alongside Dance Gavin Dance, Black Veil Brides, Tech N9ne, Jeris Johnson and Nathan James as headliners. After six years, the band also announced that they will perform outside the United States, headlining the "We Missed Ourselves Fest" in Mexico.

In 2024, "Ronald" was nominated for the 2024 Billboard Music Awards in the category Top Hard Rock Song.

== Composition and lyrics ==
The song was written by vocalist Ronnie Radke, Tyler Smyth, All That Remains guitarist Jason Richardson, Tech N9ne and drummer Luke Holland and was composed by Ronnie Radke and Tyler Smyth. It was again produced by Tyler Smyth, Ronnie Radke and Charles Kallaghan Massabo. According to an article about the song by Fresh Flow Nation, "Ronald" dives "into the transition from innocence to the harsh realities of adult life. It's as a blunt outcry against the world's darkness, underlined by a recognition of inner demons and societal evils. This song isn't just a tune; it's a bold wake-up call to the chilling truths that surround us."

The song makes use of deathcore influences in keeping with featured vocalist Alex Terrible's style, such as breakdowns, screaming, and death growls; Tech N9ne's verse features electronic trap production. Tech N9ne received some backlash for the lyrics "Sex change could get you caught up in death's range/He pled sane but really imitating Ed Gein", which were seen by some listeners as transphobic; he later explained on Instagram about the contrary, in which these lines were meant to raise awareness of trans individuals being murdered.

== Commercial performance ==
The song entered the Top 100 of YouTube Top Songs Charts in the United States for the first time, debuting at No. 74. The music video became number one on YouTube's trending page in the United States, and already has more than 33 million streams in digital platforms.

== Music video ==
The music video was again directed by Jensen Noen, who is acclaimed for his work on other music videos. The music video is a continuation of the video for the single "Watch the World Burn", beginning with Ronnie Radke waking up in an ambulance and attacking the paramedics, who are wearing the same suit as in the previous video. Radke finds himself in a post-apocalyptic world, fleeing from demons and a S.W.A.T team, before appearing with Tech N9ne, who is shown to be God, and sends Radke to hell. He confronts the Devil, who is shown to be Alex Terrible; the video ends with the two fighting, without knowing who was the winner of the fight.

== Personnel ==
Credits adapted from Genius.

Falling in Reverse

- Ronnie Radke – lead vocals, programming, producer, writer, composer, keyboards
- Max Georgiev – lead guitar
- Christian Thompson – rhythm guitar
- Luke Holland – drums, percussion, writer, composer
- Tyler Burgess – bass

Additional personnel

- Tech N9ne – guest vocals, writer
- Alex Terrible – guest vocals
- Tyler Smyth – producer, strings, additional writer, recording, mixing, mastering, programming, engineered
- Charles Kallaghan Massabo – producer, vocal producer, engineered, beat instrumental
- Jason Richardson – writer, guitar composer

== Charts ==
Chart performance for "Ronald"
Chart (2024)	Peak position
Australia Digital Tracks (ARIA)	30
France Digital Songs (SNEP)	42
New Zealand Hot Singles (RMNZ)	27
UK Singles Sales (OCC)	79
UK Singles Downloads (Official Charts)	73
UK Independent Singles Breakers (OCC)	17
UK Rock & Metal (Official Charts)	20
US Bubbling Under Hot 100 (Billboard)	13
US Digital Song Sales (Billboard)	18
US Hot Rock & Alternative Songs (Billboard)	12

== Awards and nominees ==
Year	Award	Result	Ref
2024	Billboard Music Awards: Top Hard Rock Songs	Nominated	
