= Derek Jones (musician) =

American guitarist (1984–2020)

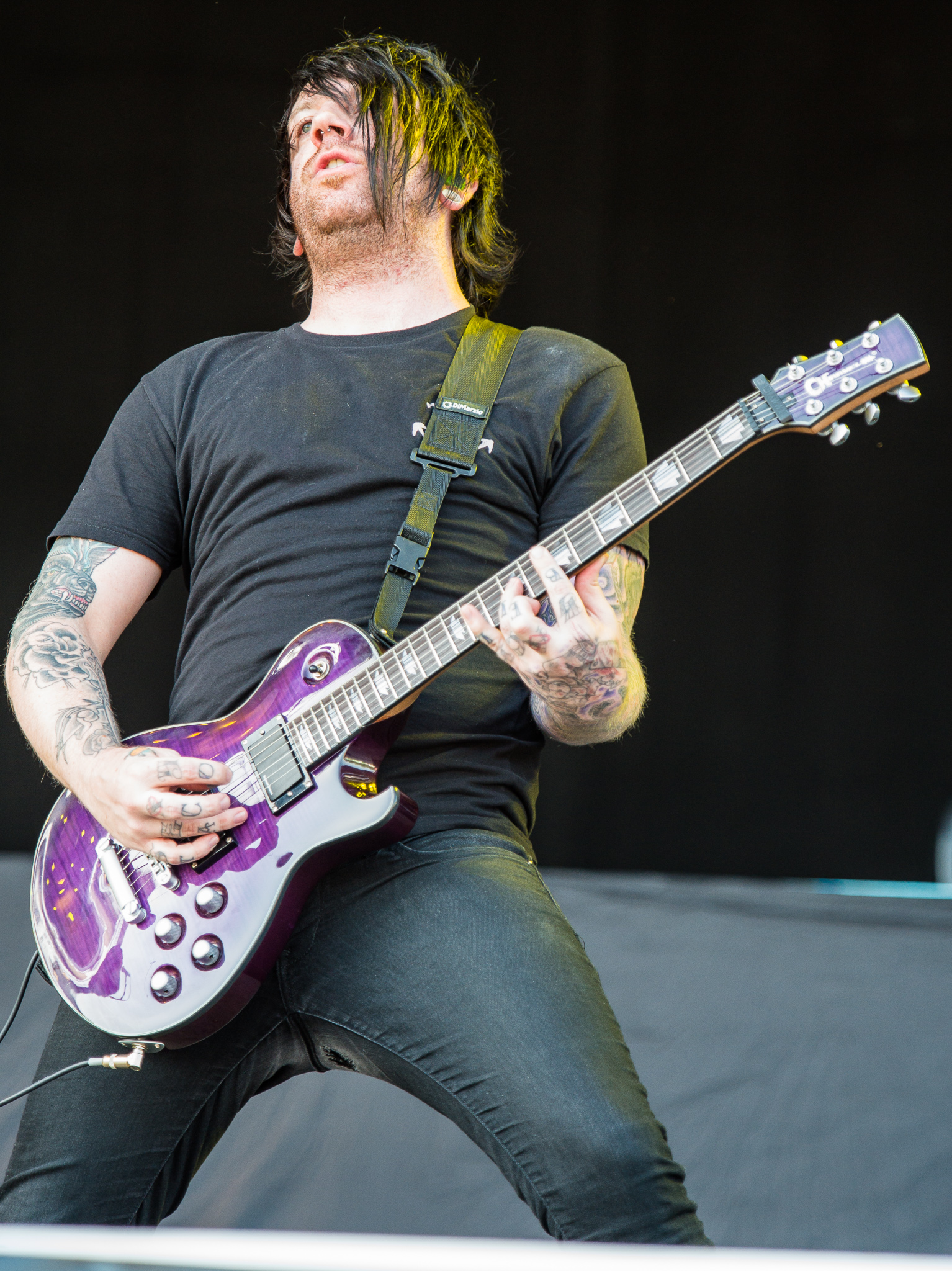
- Jones at Rock im Park 2014

Background information
- Born: June 5, 1984; Fountain Valley, California, U.S.
- Died: April 21, 2020 (aged 35)
- Genres: Post-hardcore; pop-punk; metalcore; hard rock; glam metal; screamo
- Occupation: Musician
- Instruments: Guitar; vocals
- Years active: 2006–2020
- Formerly of: Falling in Reverse; A Smile from the Trenches

Derek Jones (June 5, 1984 – April 21, 2020) was an American musician, best known as the rhythm guitarist and often co-lead vocalist for the post-hardcore band Falling in Reverse. He was also previously the guitarist of A Smile from the Trenches until his departure in 2010.

== Career ==
=== Early years ===
Jones was born June 5, 1984, in Lake Forest, California. He started playing the saxophone but switched to the guitar. He started listening to bands like Manowar, Blink-182 and Slipknot. In his adolescence, he formed several local bands, which had only small presentations until when he turned 19 and he had his first tour.

=== A Smile from the Trenches ===
In 2007, Derek joined the band A Smile from the Trenches. On June 29, 2007, they released the self-titled EP. The same year, the band was invited to the Vans Warped Tour. On October 13, 2009, they released their first studio album, titled Leave the Gambling for Vegas, on which they covered the song "Bad Romance" by Lady Gaga. In May 2010, Derek left the band to join Falling in Reverse, and the band split in September 2010.

=== Falling in Reverse ===
In 2008 Jones was part of the original lineup of Falling in Reverse while still part of A Smile From The Trenches. The band only recorded demos as Radke was in prison until December 2010. In May 2010 after leaving A Smile From The Trenches, Derek moved to Las Vegas due to his commitment to Falling In Reverse. Since Ronnie Radke was still in prison, the band had to wait for Ronnie to leave, in December 2010. On July 26, 2011, they released their first album, The Drug in Me Is You, which peaked at No. 19 on the Billboard 200, selling 18,000 copies in its first week. The band's second studio album, Fashionably Late, which was released on June 18, 2013, peaked at No. 17 on the Billboard 200. The band released their third album Just Like You on February 24, 2015. Coming Home, their fourth album, was released on April 7, 2017. This would mark the last album released whilst Derek was still alive.

Besides Ronnie, Jones was the only original member of the band until his death in 2020, and was the only member besides Radke to feature on every release.

== Personal life and death ==
In 2015, he became engaged to Christina Cetta. When Cetta was diagnosed with cancer in March 2019, Jones created a GoFundMe to raise $100,000 for Cetta's treatment. The band gave special shirts to fans who donated. Cetta died on November 19, 2019, which resulted in the cancellation of Falling in Reverse's fall tour.

Jones died on April 21, 2020; his death was announced on social media by bandmate Ronnie Radke. His cause of death was revealed later in Ronnie Radke's book I Can Explain as subdural hematoma.

== Discography ==
A Smile from the Trenches

- A Smile from the Trenches EP (2007)
- Leave the Gambling for Vegas (2009)

Falling in Reverse

- The Drug in Me Is You (2011)
- Fashionably Late (2013)
- Just Like You (2015)
- Coming Home (2017)
- Popular Monster (2024) (posthumous; rhythm guitar and backing vocals on "Popular Monster")
