= Jensen Noen =

Ukrainian director

- Дженсен Ноєн
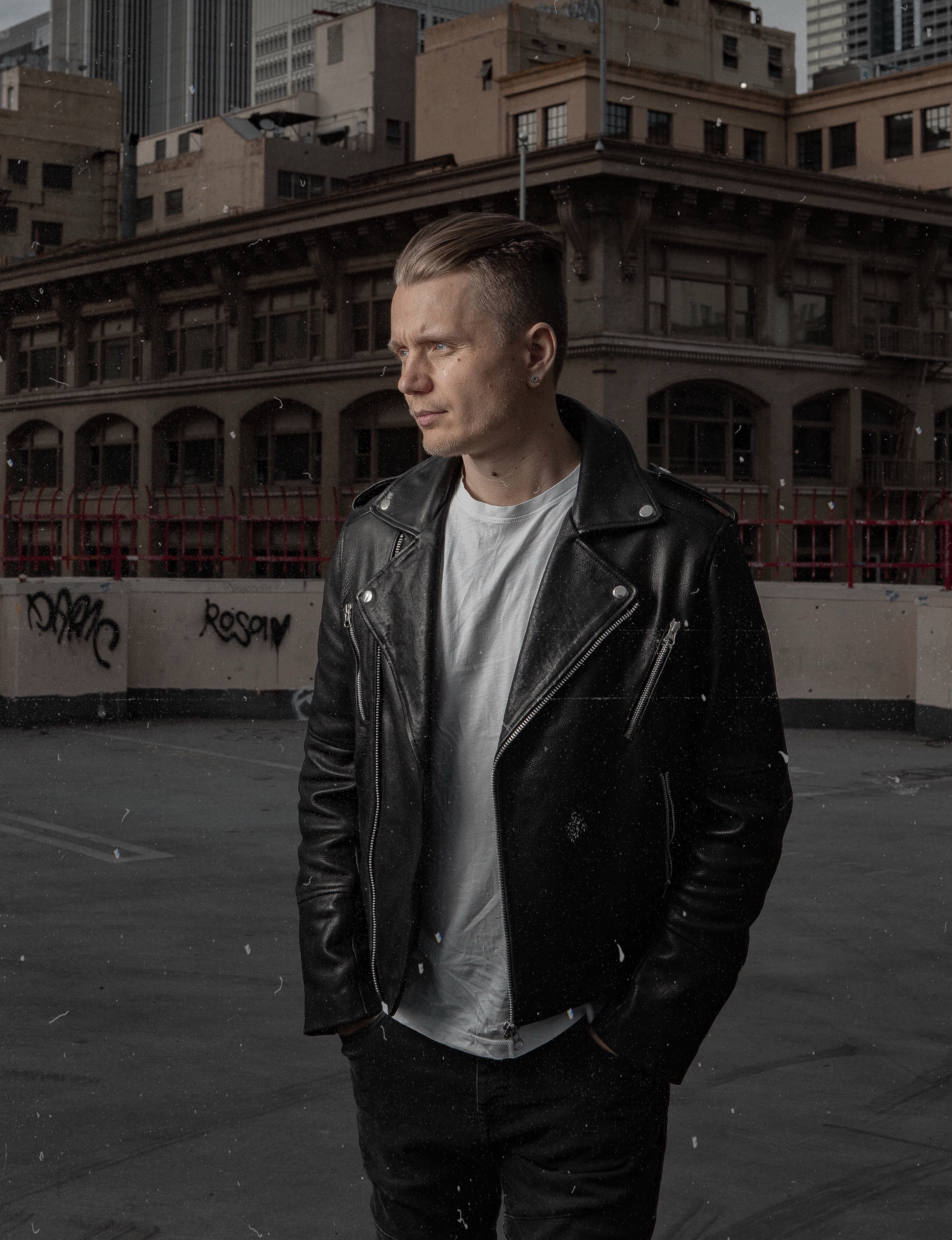
- Born: Jenya Nozhechkin; April 20, 1987 (age 39); Poltava, Ukrainian SSR, Soviet Union (now Ukraine)
- Occupations: Director; cinematographer; scriptwriter
- Years active: 2008–present
- Agent: UnderWonder content
- Spouse: Elina Fedorova (m. 2015)
- Website: jensennoen.com

Jensen Noen (Note: Ukrainian: Дженсен Ноєн, romanized: Dzhensen Noien) (born Jenya Nozhechkin, (Note: Ukrainian: Євген Ножечкін, romanized: Yevhen Nozhechkin) April 20, 1987) is a Los Angeles-based director and writer. Noen was born in Poltava, Ukraine.

Noen was named Best Director at the 2018 Mediterranean Film Festival Cannes and 2019 Flathead Lake International Cinemafest. He was also nominated for Best Director of the 2019 Flathead Lake International Cinemafest at the 2018 International Thai Film Festival. His 2009 film Oceans Within Us was named Best Short Film at the Kyiv International Short Film Festival and Best Short-Length Film of 2011 by the Ukrainian Producer Association and Association of Cinema.

His movie The Perception was named Best Film at both 2018 Mediterranean Film Festival Cannes and the 2019 Fusion Film Festival, Best Thriller at the 2018 Oniros Film Awards and Best US Made Feature Film at the 2018 Prince of Prestige Academy Awards.

His second film, Blesscode, also won awards for Best Film Script and Best Short Film at industry film festivals.

Since moving to the United States, Jensen has collaborated with Khalid, Jay Z, Bryson Tiller, Normani, Twenty One Pilots and others. He is a member of the Ukrainian Film Academy, the Union of Filmmakers of Ukraine, and the Producers Guild of Ukraine.

== Biography ==
Jensen Noen was born in Poltava, Ukraine. In 2009, he moved to Kyiv and joined a Down & Dirty rock band as a guitar and keyboard player. He began producing videos for MTV; he also directed several television shows. Later, he began directing commercials and music videos and collaborated with other Eastern European artists and labels.

In 2014, Jensen relocated to Los Angeles, California. In 2018, he completed The Perception, a feature film.

== Music videos and commercials ==
Jensen has collaborated with Demi Lovato, Ice Nine Kills, Falling in Reverse, Bring Me the Horizon, I Prevail, Jay Z, Bryson Tiller, Khalid, Normani, Maxwell, Duke Dumont, Emmure, Crown the Empire, Asking Alexandria, I See Stars, Issues, Twenty One Pilots, and with Russian pop band Ruki Vverh!. He has also directed videos for RCA, Virgin Records, Roadrunner Records, Atlantic Records, Sumerian Records, and Rise Records and directed and produced commercials.

== Films and cinematography ==
Jensen's career includes numerous short films. Most notably, he directed the award-winning shorts "Oceans Within Us" and "Blesscode," in Europe. Once he moved to the United States, he continued his film career with "Observer". Jensen's film "Gambit", about a character from the Marvel universe, was well received during its release. Afterwards, Jensen released "The Perception", which was selected by numerous film festivals.

The Perception won “Best Feature Film Director” from the ITFF Film & Entertainment Industry, “Best Feature Film Director” and “Best Screenplay” from the South Film and Arts Academy Festival, “Best Trailer” from the Pitch to Screen Film Awards in 2018, Best US made feature film from Prince of Prestige Awards 2018, and Best thriller from Oniros Film Awards 2018.

== Filmography ==
=== Films ===
- Play for Keeps, 2021 (TV)
- The Perception, 2019 (feature)
- Gambit, 2017 (short)
- Observer, 2016 (short)
- Blesscode, 2013 (short)
- Oceans Within Us, 2009 (short)

=== Music videos ===
2026

- "Machine" by Architects
- "Joseph" by Falling in Reverse
- "Play Dead" by Ice Nine Kills
- "R.I.P." by Motionless in White
- "Folded Flag" by Mat Best
- "Who Will You Follow" by Evanescence
- "Twisting the Knife" by Ice Nine Kills
- "Broken Mirror" by Architects

2025

- "Washed Up" by NF
- "Crawl Back to My Coffin" by Dayseeker
- "The Laugh Track" by Ice Nine Kills
- "City Walls" by Twenty One Pilots
- "End of You" by Poppy, Amy Lee, and Courtney LaPlante
- "All My Women" by Falling in Reverse
- "The Great Unknown" by Ice Nine Kills
- "God Is a Weapon" by Falling in Reverse
- "Pale Moonlight" by Dayseeker
- "Blackhole" by Architects

2024

- "Bad Guy" by Falling in Reverse
- "The Dam" by Daughtry
- "A Work of Art" by Ice Nine Kills
- "Sanctify Me" by In This Moment
- "Prequel" by Falling in Reverse
- "Paladin Strait" by Twenty One Pilots
- "All My Life" by Falling in Reverse
- "Ronald" by Falling in Reverse
- "Bleeders" by Black Veil Brides
- "Kool-Aid" by Bring Me the Horizon

2023

- "D4MAGE DONE" by I See Stars
- "Meat & Greet" by Ice Nine Kills
- "Spark" by ONI
- "Sign of Life" by Motionless in White
- "Aura" by ONI
- "Superhero" by Kim Dracula
- "Monster in Me" by From Ashes to New
- "The Purge" by In This Moment
- "Last Resort (Reimagined)" by Falling in Reverse
- "Lost" by Bring Me the Horizon
- "Deep End" by I Prevail
- "Still Alive" by Demi Lovato
- "Seventy Thorns" by Kim Dracula
- "Watch the World Burn" by Falling in Reverse
- "Welcome to Horrorwood" by Ice Nine Kills

2022

- "Paranoid (Crash & Burn)" by Pop Evil
- "There's Fear in Letting Go" by I Prevail
- "Werewolf" by Motionless in White
- "Self-Destruction" by I Prevail
- "The Shower Scene" by Ice Nine Kills
- "Voices in My Head" by Falling in Reverse
- "Wake Me Up (When This Nightmare's Over)" by Simple Plan
- "Face to Face" by Pony Wave
- "I'm Not" by Zero 9:36
- "CHAOS" by Hollywood Undead
- "Ruin My Life" by Simple Plan
- "Zombified" by Falling in Reverse

2021

- "The Antidote" by Simple Plan
- "Funeral Derangements" by Ice Nine Kills
- "Rainy Day" by Ice Nine Kills
- "Black Leather" by Call Me Karizma
- "Black Hole" by We Came as Romans
- "Assault & Batteries" by Ice Nine Kills
- "Hip To Be Scared" by Ice Nine Kills
- "Secret Garden" by Spiritbox
- "Big Bands" by AYLEK$
- "I'm Not A Vampire (Revamped)" by Falling in Reverse

2020

- "Dying to Live" by Sevendust
- "Nails" by Call Me Karizma
- "BLURRY (Out of Place)" by Crown the Empire
- "The Drug in Me is Reimagined" by Falling in Reverse

2019

- "Popular Monster" by Falling in Reverse
- "Flexin" by Issues
- "The Violence" by Asking Alexandria
- "Monster (Under My Bed)" by Call Me Karizma

2017

- "Nowhere Left to Sink" by Like Moths to Flames
- "Into the Fire" by Asking Alexandria
- "Trapped" by KORR-A

2016

- "Calm Snow" by I See Stars
- "Decisions" by Now I See
- "Everybody Get Down" by KORR-A
- "Cali Love" by KORR-A
- "Blindfolds" by Rilan

2015

- "One Shot" by Multiverse
- "Prisoners of War" by Crown the Empire
- "Heart of Glass" by KORR-A
- "Union" by Vo'Devil Stokes
- "Mood for Love" by The Gitas
- "Brust" by Majentta
- "A Gift A Curse" by Emmure

2014

- "I Will Never Lose My Way" by Down & Dirty
- "Wind Inside" by NUTEKI
- "Skeletons" by Heartist

2013

- "Move It" by Down & Dirty

== Awards ==
- 2026 – MUSIC VIDEO OF THE WEEK, Architects – Machine, Director Jensen Noen | Berlin Music Video Awards
- 2025 – Best Metal, Falling In Reverse - "Prequel", Director Jensen Noen | Hollywood Music Video Awards
- 2025 – Best Directing, Falling In Reverse - "Prequel", Director Jensen Noen - nominee | Hollywood Music Video Awards
- 2023 – Best Rock Music Video, Bring Me The Horizon – “LosT”, Director Jensen Noen | UK Music Video Awards (UK)
- 2023 – Best Rock Music Video, Falling In Reverse – “Watch The World Burn”, Director Jensen Noen | UK Music Video Awards (International)
- 2023 – Best Director, Jensen Noen / Falling In Reverse – “Watch The World Burn” | Berlin Music Video Awards
- 2023 – Best Music Video, "Motionless In White – Werewolf", Director Jensen Noen | Heavy Metal Music Awards
- 2022 – Best War Short Film, "Wake Me Up", By Jensen Noen | South Film and Arts Academy Festival
- 2022 – Best Director In A Short Film, Jensen Noen / Wake Me Up | South Film and Arts Academy Festival
- 2022 – Best Music Video, "Falling In Reverse – Zombified", Director Jensen Noen | Falcon International Film Festival
- 2021 – Best Music Video, Falling In Reverse – “I’m Not A Vampire (Revamped)”, Director Jensen Noen | London Independent Film Awards – London, United Kingdom
- 2021 – Best Music Video, Falling In Reverse – “I’m Not A Vampire (Revamped)”, Director Jensen Noen | Falcon International Film Festival – London, United Kingdom
- 2021 – Best Music Video, Falling In Reverse – “I’m Not A Vampire (Revamped)”, Director Jensen Noen | Open Window International Film Challenge – Bengal, India
- 2021 – Best Music Video, Falling In Reverse – “I’m Not A Vampire (Revamped)”, Director Jensen Noen | The Hollywood Boulevard Film Festival – Hollywood, United States
- 2021 – Best Music Video, Falling In Reverse – “I’m Not A Vampire (Revamped)”, Director Jensen Noen | The Canadian Diversity Film Festival – Ontario, Canada
- 2021 – Best Music Video, Falling In Reverse – “I’m Not A Vampire (Revamped)”, Director Jensen Noen | Los Angeles Film Awards – Los Angeles, United States
- 2018 – Best US made feature film – The Perception (Director: Jensen Noen), at Prince of Prestige Awards – Apopka, FL, United States
- 2018 – Best thriller – The Perception (Director: Jensen Noen), at Oniros Film Awards – Aosta, Italy
- 2018 – Best Foreign Feature Film Director for The Perception at ITFF Film & Entertainment Industry
- 2018 – Best Feature Film Director and Best Screenplay for The Perception at the South Film and Arts Academy Festival
- 2018 – Best Trailer for The Perception at Pitch to Screen Film Awards
- 2017 – Honored artist of various arts of Ukraine – Film Director and Producer
- 2017 – Honorary Award for his excellent art level and high viewer interest for Gambit – The Association of Producers of Ukraine
- 2016 – “I See Stars – Calm Snow” – Nomination: Best Music Video of the Year by the version of Alternative Press Music Awards
- 2016 – First-degree diploma, a harmonic realization of music and picture in the film "Observer" and his producer professionalism – The Association of Producers of Ukraine
- 2015 – Short Film Blesscode – Film Festival Winner In the nomination ‘Short film’ at Independent International Internet Short
- 2015 – Honorary Award for best film director and producer – The Association of Producers of Ukraine
- 2014 – Best Producer – Association at Cannes Film Marketplace by the Head of The Association of Producers of Ukraine
- 2013 – Honorary Award for Personal Achievement – Institute of Producing of Ukraine
- 2013 – Short film “Blesscode” – "Best Short Film Script" by the Association of Producers of Ukraine
- 2012 – First Place Amateur Cinema Art – Kyiv Popular Arts Festival
- 2011 – Oceans Within Us – Best short-length film of 2011 by the Ukrainian Producer Association and Association of Cinema
- 2009 – Oceans Within Us, the grand prize winner at Kyiv International Short Film Festival (KISFF)
