= Coming Home (Falling in Reverse album) =

Studio album by Falling in Reverse
- Released: April 7, 2017
- Recorded: 2016
- Genre: Pop-punk; electropop; space rock; post-hardcore; hard rock
- Length: 43:50
- Label: Epitaph
- Producer: Michael Baskette; Ronnie Radke (co.); Tyler Smyth (co.)

Falling in Reverse chronology
Just Like You (2015)	Coming Home (2017)	Popular Monster (2024)

Singles from Coming Home
- 1. "Coming Home" Released: December 18, 2016; 2. "Loser" Released: January 19, 2017; 3. "Broken" Released: March 21, 2017; 4. "Superhero" Released: July 10, 2017; 5. "Fuck You and All Your Friends" Released: November 28, 2017

Coming Home is the fourth studio album by American rock band Falling in Reverse. The album was released through Epitaph Records on April 7, 2017. It is the first album to feature guitarist Christian Thompson, the last album to feature drummer Ryan Seaman, and the only album to feature bassist Zakk Sandler.

== Background ==
The band members announced in 2016 that they had begun to work on their next album stating "It's a huge left turn. It sounds like nothing we've ever done. Every song is very vibey, there's more feeling in it instead of a lot of metal," further stating that, "We're challenging ourselves now more than we ever have in the weirdest ways possible, because you would think writing the craziest solo or riffs would be the challenging part. But the challenging part is trying to stick to a theme and not go all over the place like we would normally do." On December 19, the band released the first single "Coming Home" from the album that at the time was not named. On January 20, 2017, the band announced that the album would be called "Coming Home." The same day, they released the single "Loser." The third single "Broken" was released on March 21, 2017. On April 4, 2017, they released a music video for "Coming Home."

Ronnie Radke played a previously unreleased song from the album titled "Carry On" during one of his Twitch streams, which drew high interest from fans in wanting the song for download or digital streaming. As a response to this, Falling in Reverse released the song on July 14, 2020.

== Composition ==
Musically, Coming Home has been described as pop-punk, electropop, space rock, post-hardcore, hard rock, and progressive rock.

== Critical reception ==
Professional ratings
Aggregate scores
Source	Rating
Metacritic	67/100
Review scores
Source	Rating
AllMusic	4/5 stars
Alternative Press	80/100
Classic Rock	1.5/5 stars
Hard Rock Reviews	8.5/10
Kerrang!	KKK
Punknews.org	1.5/5 stars
Rock Sound	6/10

According to the review aggregator Metacritic, Coming Home received "generally favorable reviews" based on a weighted average score of 67 out of 100 from 6 critic scores.

== Commercial performance ==
The album debuted at number 15 on the US Billboard Top Album Sales chart. By May 2020, the album had already sold more than 97,000 copies in the United States. By May 2024, the album had sold 203,000 copies in the US.

== Track listing ==
No.	Title	Length
1.	"Coming Home"	4:54
2.	"Broken"	3:55
3.	"Loser"	4:13
4.	"Fuck You and All Your Friends"	3:11
5.	"I Hate Everyone"	3:39
6.	"I'm Bad at Life"	3:55
7.	"Hanging On"	3:48
8.	"Superhero"	3:13
9.	"Straight to Hell"	3:50
10.	"I Don't Mind"	4:24
11.	"The Departure"	4:48
Total length:		43:50

Digital and deluxe edition bonus tracks
No.	Title	Length
12.	"Right Now"	3:28
13.	"Paparazzi"	4:02
Total length:		51:20

B-side
No.	Title	Length
1.	"Carry On"	4:55
Total length:		4:55

== Personnel ==
Credits for Coming Home adapted from AllMusic.

Falling in Reverse

- Ronnie Radke – lead vocals, co-production
- Derek Jones – guitar
- Ryan Seaman – drums
- Zakk Sandler – bass
- Christian Thompson – guitar

Additional personnel

- Nick Agee – assistant engineering
- Michael "Elvis" Baskette – production, mixing, guitars, bass guitar
- Carly Cressler – album layout
- Rowan Daly – back cover photography
- Brendan Donahue – band photography
- Mike Eckes – assistant engineering
- Patrick Kehrier – assistant engineering
- Jason Link – album layout
- Vlado Meller – mastering
- Jef Moll – engineering
- Tyler Smyth – co-production, additional engineering, programming, guitars, bass guitar
- Kevin Thomas – assistant engineering

== Charts ==
Chart (2017)	Peak position
Australian Albums (ARIA)	16
Belgian Albums (Ultratop Wallonia)	150
New Zealand Heatseekers Albums (RMNZ)	3
Scottish Albums (OCC)	87
UK Albums (OCC)	89
UK Rock & Metal Albums (OCC)	3
US Billboard 200	34
US Independent Albums (Billboard)	7
US Top Album Sales (Billboard)	15
US Top Alternative Albums (Billboard)	4
US Top Hard Rock Albums (Billboard)	2
US Top Rock Albums (Billboard)	5
