= Luke Holland =

American drummer (born 1993)

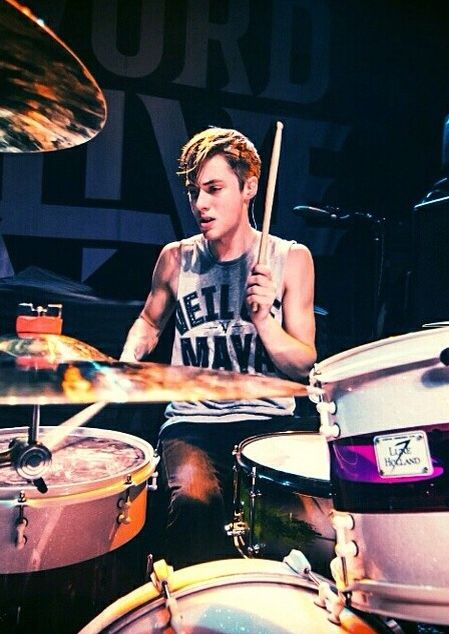
- Holland performing in 2014

Background information
- Born: Luke Daniel Holland; June 14, 1993 (age 33); Peoria, Arizona, U.S.
- Genres: Metalcore; post-hardcore; alternative metal; pop rock; progressive metal
- Occupations: Musician; YouTuber
- Instrument: Drums • piano
- Years active: 2009–present
- Label: Fearless
- Member of: Falling in Reverse
- Formerly of: The Word Alive

YouTube information
- Channel: LukeHollandDrums
- Subscribers: 725 thousand
- Views: 132.9 million
- Last updated: August 3rd, 2026

Luke Daniel Holland (born June 14, 1993) is an American musician, popular for his playthrough videos and having previously played in The Word Alive. He has recorded drums for many artists including Jason Richardson, I See Stars, and Falling in Reverse. He is currently the drummer for Falling in Reverse.

== Biography ==
He was born in Peoria, Arizona. Holland gained interest in the drums after hearing his neighbor playing at the age of 10. Around the same time, he bought his first drum kit, having saved up enough money after mowing lawns for a year. Self-taught, he played the snare drum in his high school marching band for a year and a half at Peoria High School throughout 2007 and 2008.

At the age of 15, after playing for local band Oceans Will Part, Holland took to self-promotion online, making a YouTube account in July 2009, under the name LukeHollandDrums where he started to post drum covers and remixes. At the age of 16, Holland got a chance to stand-in as the drummer for Texas in July. Around the same time, his YouTube page was noticed by Josh Chomik, a fellow YouTuber known for his comedy music. His popularity increased immensely, going from a thousand subscribers to over nine thousand subscribers plus in a few days. From 2009 to 2016, Holland's YouTube channel has reached over 620,000+ subscribers, and over 55 million views.

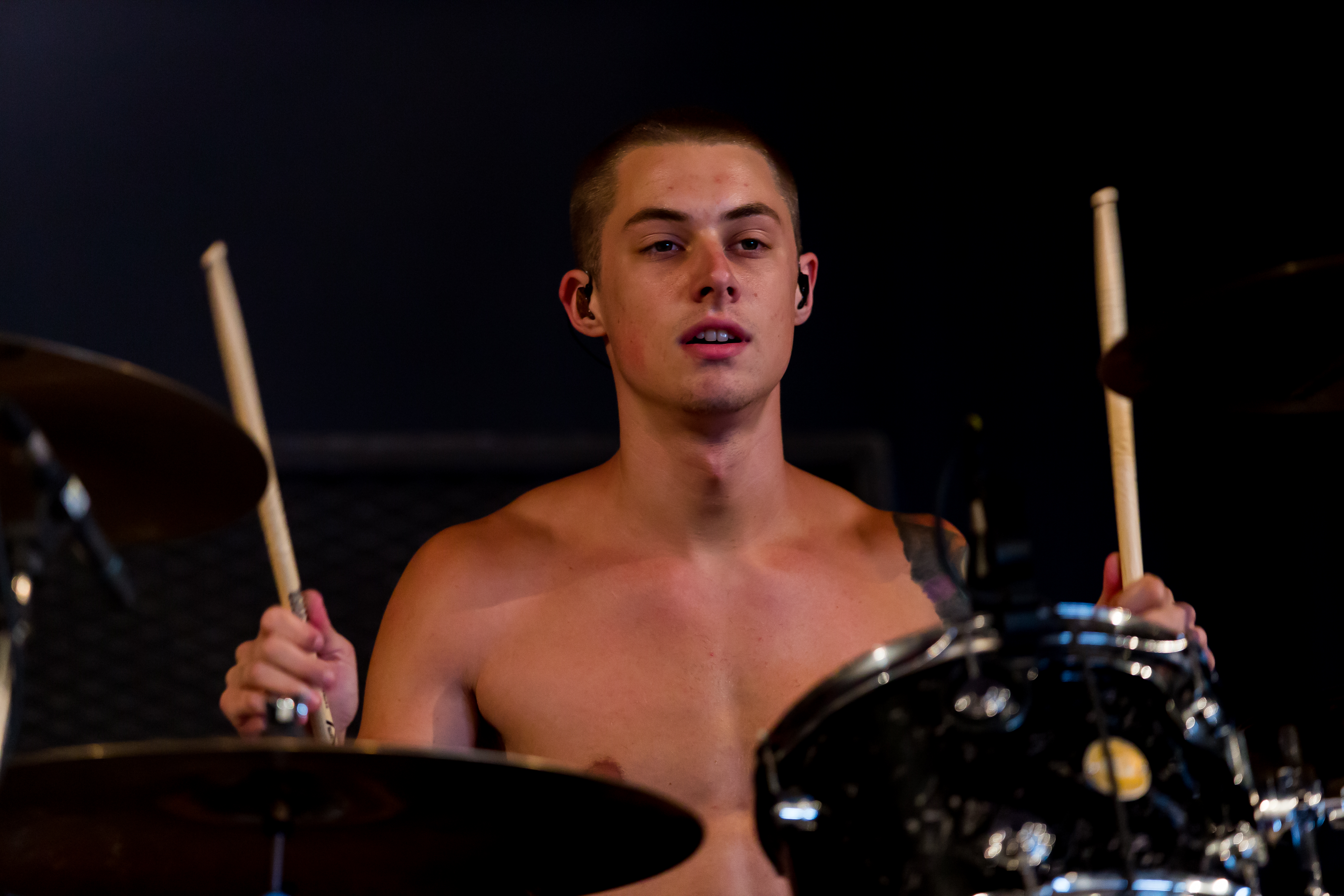
Holland with The Word Alive in 2016

Apart from YouTube, Holland is known for being a past member of metalcore band The Word Alive. He played in the band from early 2012 to late 2016, leaving to pursue more activity on his YouTube channel, session work, giving drum lessons, and occasional touring.

In 2013, Holland was voted third on Alternative Press' Drummer of the Year, and second for Modern Drummer's Up & Coming.

In 2014, Holland along with Issues vocalist Tyler Carter contributed a cover of Paramore's hit song "Ain't It Fun" for the Fearless compilation Punk Goes Pop Vol. 6.

Holland worked as a session drummer for I See Stars on their album, Treehouse, which was released in June 2016.

Holland was featured on Jason Richardson's debut album I, which was released in July 2016.

In 2017, Holland formed a new band The Evening with Elijah Trey and former guitarist of From First to Last, Taylor Larson.

In mid 2017, Holland played drums for Playboi Carti's performance in the Jimmy Kimmel Live! show.

On July 10, 2019, Jeremy Renner uploaded the music video for his single, "Main Attraction", featuring Holland as his drummer.

On September 13, 2019, rock band Starset released their album Divisions, with Holland on drums for the entire album.

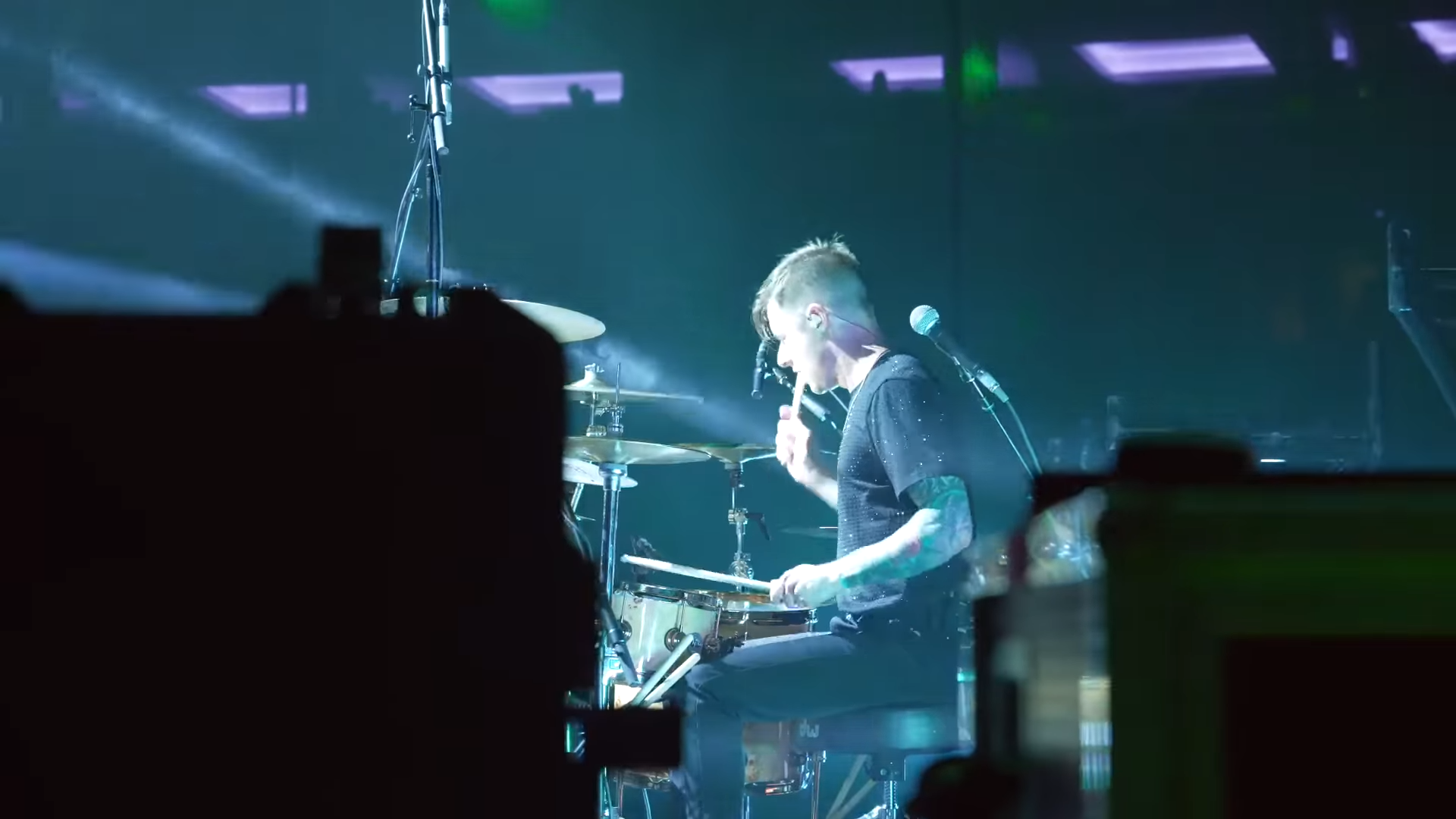
Holland with Falling in Reverse in 2023

Luke Holland has also appeared as the drummer in the music video for Falling in Reverse called "Zombified" alongside the main vocalist and only permanent member, Ronnie Radke and Wes Horton. He is also their current drummer.

In February 2022, Holland and Jason Richardson released the music video for "Upside Down", from their upcoming 2nd album, II. In March, "Ishimura" was released, and in April, "p00mbachu" was released. The album released on July 15, 2022.

== Endorsements ==
- Meinl Percussion Cymbals
- DW Drums
- Meinl Stick and Brush
- Remo Drumheads

== Gear ==
Drums: DW (Drum Workshop) 4pcs Collector Series Custom Kit (w/ full maple shell, Rose Gold Hardware and Natural Over Mapa Burl finish) :

- 14" X 6.5" Snare
- 12" X 8" Rack Tom
- 16" X 14" Floor Tom
- 22" X 18" Bass Drum

Hardwares: DW(Drum Workshop):

- DW 9002 XF Double Bass Drum Pedal
- DW DWCP9500TB 9000 series hi hat stand

Cymbals: Meinl Cymbals:

- 14" Pure Alloy Traditional Hats
- 8" Byzance Traditional Splash
- 18" Byzance Traditional Medium Thin Crash
- 19" Byzance Traditional Medium Thin Crash
- 21" Byzance Vintage C2 Ride
- 18" Byzance China
- Luke Holland Signature Bullet Stack
- 16" Byzance Vintage Trash Crash
- 12" Classics Custom Trash Splash
- Luke Holland Signature Baby Stack

Drumsticks: Meinl Stick and Brush:

- Luke Holland Signature Stick

Drumheads: Remo Drumheads:

- Snare Drumheads : Powerstroke 77 (Batter/Top), Ambassador(Resonant/Bottom)
- Tom-tom Drumheads : Clear/Vintage Emperor or Powerstroke 4 (Batter/Top), Ambassador(Resonant/Bottom)
- Bass Drumhead : Controlled Sound Black Dot (Batter/Back), Standard DW Resonant Head (Resonant/Front)

== Videos ==
From 2009 to 2016, Holland's YouTube videos have gained over a few hundred thousand views to a few million views each.

Holland's most popular YouTube video is his drum remix of Blackpink's "DDU-DU DDU-DU", which has grossed over 7.8 million views since July 29, 2018.

Some of Hollands's other popular YouTube videos (based on their viewership) include:

- "Like A G6" (by Far East Movement) Drum Cover. Posted on November 14, 2010, with 1.4 million views.
- "Look at Me Now" (by Chris Brown, featuring Busta Rhymes and Lil Wayne) Drum Cover. Posted on April 24, 2011, with 1.5 million views.
- "Upside Down" (by Bassnectar) Drum Remix. Posted April 11, 2012, with 1.1 million views.
- "Goin' In" (By Skrillex (Birdy Nam Nam) Drum Remix. Posted September 21, 2012, with 1.7 million views.
- "Misery Business" (by Paramore) Drum Cover. Posted November 7, 2012, with 1.6 million views.
- "Ignorance" (by Paramore) Drum Cover. Posted January 7, 2013, with 1.2 million views.
- "Bittersweet" (by Ellie Goulding) Drum Remix. Posted May 11, 2013, with 1.9 million views.
- "Fine China" (Originally by Chris Brown) with Tyler Carter. Posted October 8, 2013, with 1 million views.
- "Physical Education" (by Animals As Leaders) Drum Cover. Posted September 5, 2014, with 1 million views.
- "Where Are Ü Now" (by Skrillex & Diplo of Jack Ü, featuring Justin Bieber) Drum Remix. Posted April 5, 2015, with 1.2 million views.
- “Cinema” (by Skrillex) Drum Remix. Posted January 11, 2012, with 6.1 million views.

== Discography ==
- Oceans Will Part – Obsidian Resolve (Self-released, 2010)
- The Word Alive – Real (Fearless, 2014)
- The Word Alive – Dark Matter (Fearless, 2016)
- I See Stars – Treehouse (Sumerian, 2016)
- Jason Richardson – I (2016)
- Starset – Divisions (2019)
- Hollywood Undead – New Empire, Vol. 1 (2020)
- Hollywood Undead – New Empire, Vol. 2 (2020)
- Jason Richardson & Luke Holland – II (2022)
- Falling in Reverse - Popular Monster (2024)
- I See Stars - THE WHEEL (2025)

Other appearances

- Punk Goes Pop Vol. 6 – Contributed a cover of Paramore's song "Ain't It Fun" with Issues lead vocalist Tyler Carter
- How It Feels to Be Lost – Contributed drums on Sleeping with Sirens song, "Blood Lines"
- Live From The Unknown – Contributed drums on Falling in Reverse live streamed shows.
