= Charles Kallaghan Massabo =

- Born: France
- Origin: Los Angeles, California, U.S.
- Occupations: Singer-songwriter, musician, producer
- Instruments: Vocals, guitar
- Labels: Epitaph, Fearless, Kallaghan Records
- Website: www.kallaghanrecords.com

Charles Kallaghan Massabo, is a French record producer, songwriter and musician, based in Los Angeles, California, United States, best known for his work with Falling in Reverse, Metro Station and other projects, such as Ronnie Radke's rap mixtape "Watch Me" and Jacky Vincent's solo project. Massabo produced and mixed Davey Suicide "Made from Fire" hitting Billboard charts #3 on Heatseakers, #14 on independent albums and #24 on top hard rock charts.

== Work ==
Massabo was an additional producer and songwriter for Just Like You released by Epitaph Records which charted #21 at Billboard 200. He also produced the cover song "Gangsta's Paradise" for Falling in Reverse released by Fearless Records on the compilation Punk Goes 90s Vol. 2. The mixtape "watch me" he produced for Ronnie Radke includes collaborations with artists such as Tyler Carter (Issues), Danny Worsnop (We Are Harlot), Andy Biersack (Black Veil Brides) and Deuce (ex-member of Hollywood Undead).

Charles owns the production company Kallaghan Records USA LLC and is not only involved in American artists production, but also in hiphop with artists such as Bobby Falcon, Blay (hype man for Deuce) and with upcoming international artists such as Ze Gran Zeft, Magoa etc...

== Career ==
Massabo started as a singer and producer for the French metal band S.I.K.H which got signed to Drakkar Records / Sony BMG before joining companies New Wave Labs and Madwaves as an Artistic Director .

He opened a recording studio based on the French Riviera "Kallaghan Studio" which created music content for companies such as Google, Ubisoft, and Sony Entertainment

Kallaghan then joined and produced Censura! in Ireland and got the band signed to Bieler Bros Records playing with his lifetime friend Devin Lebsack (ex-drummer from (hed)p.e. he met through a tour where Sikh was supporting (hed)p.e.

He also joined and produced the French rock fusion band Really Addictive Sound who toured for Californian snowboard company "BIG DREAMS" supporting promotion for Burton Snowboarding B video Really Addictive SOund got Selected by Google and got featured on G1-G2 phones. Through that tour he met multi-platinum music producer Mudrock which produced a project with Charles and Devin Lebsack called "Overly Green" which never got released by a label.

Doing recording sessions at Hobby Shop studio, he met the rapper B.LAY (hype guy for Deuce) for which he produced a mix tape for. He also met Ronnie Radke for whom he produced the song Black List. He then started collaboration with RR for Epitaph, Fearless Records and other bands from California.
