= DangerKids =

American metalcore band

Dangerkids
- Origin: Dayton, Ohio, U.S.
- Genres: Nu metalcore, rap metal
- Years active: 2012–present
- Labels: Paid Vacation; Rise
- Members: Andy Bane; Tyler Smyth; Jake Bonham; Katie Cole; Alex Asch
- Website: wearedangerkids.com

Dangerkids (stylised as DangerKids or dangerkids) is an American metalcore band formed in Dayton, Ohio, in 2012. The band's line-up consists of dual vocalists Andy Bane and Tyler Smyth, guitarist Alex Asch, bassist Jake Bonham and drummer Katie Cole.

The band's debut album, Collapse, was released on Rise Records in 2012. Dangerkids moved to Paid Vacation Records for their sophomore release, blacklist_, released in 2017. In November 2020, Tyler Smyth revealed the band were working on their third album.

== History ==
The various members of Dangerkids were friends for many years before the band formed. Each played in other bands in Dayton, Ohio before deciding to form Dangerkids. Andy Bane stated in a 2014 interview that the band couldn't remember why they'd chosen their name, but that "we felt like it had sort of a hip hop element to it which seemed fitting for us."

Their first single, "Hostage", arrived in July 2013. Dangerkids' debut album, Collapse, was released in 2013 to mixed reviews overall. Alternative Press compared the band favourably to Linkin Park, while other reviews were more measured with Sputnik Music describing it as "decent enough."

In 2016 Dangerkids returned with "Things Could Be Different", the first single to be taken from their second album. This was followed by another single, "Kill Everything" in 2017, before the album's release later that year. Critics assessed 2017's _blacklist album as growing on the band's potential, with CrypticRock giving the album 4 out of 5 stars. In 2017, vocalists of Dangerkids, Tyler Smyth and Andy Bane, performed the theme song for Infinite, for the video game Sonic Forces. The track has since received over 10 million views on YouTube, their most-viewed.

Dangerkids have continued to tour throughout their career, both across the United States and in European countries including Germany, Belgium and the UK.

Smyth revealed on his personal Facebook page on November 9, 2020, that the band were working on their third album.

On February 10, 2022, a remix of the song "Fist Bump" from the video game Sonic Forces was released, featuring DangerKids.

Tyler Smyth featured in the song "Find Your Flame" for the video game Sonic Frontiers alongside vocalist Kellin Quinn of Sleeping with Sirens. The game was released on November 8, 2022. Smyth also assisted in production of some vocal themes in the game.

== Style and influences ==
Dangerkids is a rock band that fuses elements of electronic dance music, metalcore, hip hop and post-hardcore. Tyler Smyth cites Rage Against the Machine as an influence. Smyth was a fan of Pink Floyd in his youth.

== Band members ==
- Andy Bane – lead vocals (2012–present)
- Tyler Smyth – clean vocals, rapping, synths, production (2012–present)
- Alex Asch – guitars (2012–present)
- Jake Bonham – bass, backing vocals (2012–present)
- Katie Cole – drums (2012–present)

== Discography ==
=== Studio albums ===
- Collapse – Rise Records (2013)
- blacklist_ – Paid Vacation Records (2017)
