= Black Veil Brides discography =

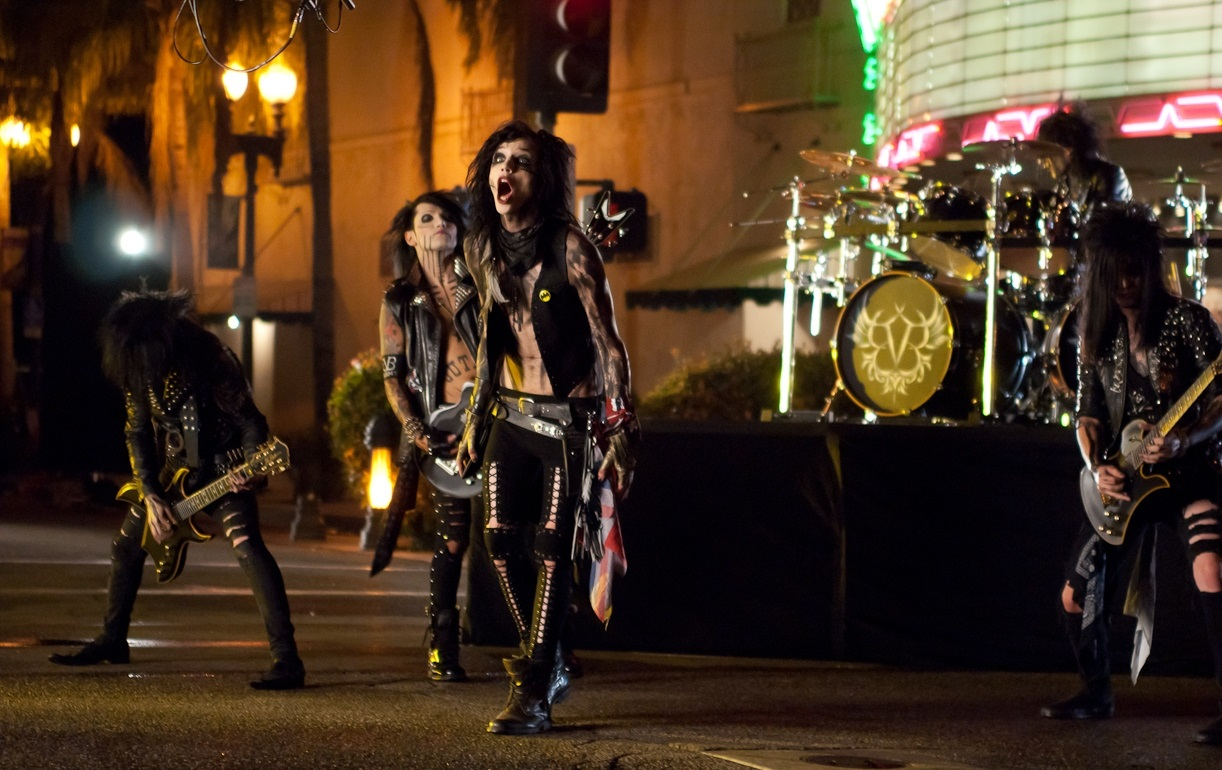
- Black Veil Brides in the music video for "Rebel Love Song". From left to right: Jinxx, Ashley Purdy, Andy Biersack, Christian "CC" Coma, and Jake Pitts
- Studio albums: 7
- Extended plays: 6
- Singles: 30
- Music videos: 26

The discography of American rock band Black Veil Brides consists of 7 studio albums, 6 extended plays, 30 singles, 26 music videos, and 1 short film.

== Albums ==
=== Studio albums ===
Title	Album details	Peak chart positions										Certifications
Title	Album details	US	US Rock	US Hard Rock	US Digital	AUS	CAN	IRE	NL	UK	UK Rock	Certifications
We Stitch These Wounds	Released: July 20, 2010; Label: Standby	36	10	3	25	—	—	—	—	—	20	BPI: Silver
Set the World on Fire	Released: June 14, 2011; Label: Lava/Universal Republic	17	3	2	19	77	—	93	—	54	4	BPI: Silver
Wretched and Divine: The Story of the Wild Ones	Released: January 8, 2013; Label: Lava/Universal Republic	7	2	2	6	17	—	76	83	20	1	BPI: Silver
Black Veil Brides	Released: October 27, 2014; Label: Lava/Republic	10	2	2	5	23	13	29	82	17	5	
Vale	Released: January 12, 2018; Label: Lava/Republic	14	2	1	3	13	13	—	158	23	1	
The Phantom Tomorrow	Released: October 29, 2021; Label: Sumerian	176	—	—	—	—	—	—	—	—	6	
Vindicate	Released: May 8, 2026; Label: Spinefarm	159	—	—	—	19	—	—	—	72	2	

=== Video albums ===
Title	Year	Director
Alive and Burning	2015	Casey Tebo

=== Re-recordings ===
Title	Album details	Peak chart positions
Title	Album details	UK Rock
Re-Stitch These Wounds	Released: July 31, 2020; Label: Sumerian	10

== Extended plays ==
Title	Album details
Rebels	Released: December 13, 2011; Label: Lava/Universal Republic Records
The Night	Released: November 29, 2019; Label: Sumerian
The Mourning	Released: October 21, 2022; Label: Sumerian
Bleeders	Released: June 21, 2024; Label: Spinefarm
The Black	Released: November 26, 2026; Label: Spinefarm

== Unofficial EPs ==
Title	Year
Sex & Hollywood	Released: August 25, 2007
Never Give In	Released: June 23, 2008

== Singles ==
Title	Year	Peak chart positions					Certifications	Album
Title	Year	US Main.	US Active Rock	US Rock	HUN	UK Rock	Certifications	Album
"Knives and Pens"	2009	—	—	—	—	—		We Stitch These Wounds
"Perfect Weapon"	2010	—	—	—	—	—		We Stitch These Wounds
"Fallen Angels"	2011	36	33	—	—	8	RIAA: Gold	Set the World on Fire
"The Legacy"	2011	29	28	—	—	—		Set the World on Fire
"Rebel Love Song"	2011	—	—	—	—	—		Set the World on Fire
"In the End"	2012	12	11	39	—	4	RIAA: Platinum; BPI: Silver	Wretched and Divine: The Story of the Wild Ones
"Revelation"	2013	—	—	—	—	34		Wretched and Divine: The Story of the Wild Ones
"Wretched and Divine"	2013	—	—	—	—	—		Wretched and Divine: The Story of the Wild Ones
"We Don't Belong"	2013	—	—	—	—	—		Wretched and Divine: The Story of the Wild Ones
"Unbroken"	2013	—	—	—	—	18		Avengers Assemble: Music from and Inspired by the Motion Picture
"Heart of Fire"	2014	—	—	—	—	25		Black Veil Brides
"Goodbye Agony"	2014	36	—	—	—	—		Black Veil Brides
"The Outsider"	2016	—	—	—	—	—		Vale
"My Vow"	2018	—	—	—	—	—		Vale
"When They Call My Name"	2018	—	—	—	—	—		Vale
"The Last One"	2018	34	—	—	—	—		Vale
"Wake Up"	2018	—	—	—	—	—		Vale
"Ballad of the Lonely Hearts"	2018	—	—	—	—	—		Vale
"Scarlet Cross"	2020	8	—	—	27	—		The Phantom Tomorrow
"Fields of Bone"	2021	—	—	—	—	—		The Phantom Tomorrow
"Crimson Skies"	2021	19	—	—	—	—		The Phantom Tomorrow
"Torch"	2021	—	—	—	—	—		The Phantom Tomorrow
"Saviour II"	2022	19	—	—	—	—		The Mourning
"Temple of Love"	2023	—	—	—	—	—		Non-album single
"Bleeders"	2024	9	—	—	—	— (Note: "Bleeders" did not enter the UK Rock & Metal Chart, but peaked at number 88 on the UK Singles Sales Chart.)		Vindicate
"My Friends"	2024	—	—	—	—	—		Bleeders
"Hallelujah"	2025	—	—	—	—	—		Vindicate
"The End of Us" (with TX2)	2025	—	—	—	—	—		The End of Us
"Certainty"	2026	—	—	—	—	—		Vindicate
"Vindicate"	2026	25	—	—	—	—		Vindicate
"Revenger" (with Machine Head)	2026	—	—	—	—	—		Vindicate
"Cut" (with Lilith Czar)	2026	28	—	—	—	—		Vindicate
"—" denotes a release that did not chart. "×" denotes periods where charts did not exist or were not archived.

== Other charted songs ==
Title	Year	UK Rock	Album
"Unholy" (featuring Zakk Wylde)	2011	9	Rebels
"Rebel Yell" (Note: Cover song of the original by Billy Idol)	2011	8	Rebels
"Coffin"	2011	5	Rebels

== Videography ==
=== Music videos ===
Title	Year	Director
"Knives and Pens"	2009	Patrick Fogarty
"Perfect Weapon"	2010	Patrick Fogarty
"Fallen Angels"	2011	Nathan Cox
"The Legacy"	2011	Patrick Fogarty
"Rebel Love Song"	2011	Patrick Fogarty
"Rebel Love Song" (Director's Version)	2011	Patrick Fogarty
"Rebel Yell"	2011	Fer Troncoso
"Coffin"	2012	Patrick Fogarty
"In the End"	2012	Patrick Fogarty
"Heart of Fire"	2014	Patrick Fogarty
"Goodbye Agony"	2014	Patrick Fogarty
"Wake Up"	2018	Robby Starbuck
"When They Call My Name"	2018	Dan Sturgess
"Saints of the Blood"	2019	Patrick Fogarty
"The Vengeance"	2019	Patrick Fogarty
"Scarlet Cross"	2020	Patrick Fogarty
"Fields of Bone"	2021	Andy Biersack
"Torch"	2021	Andy Biersack
"Born Again"	2022	Vicente Cordero
"Saviour II"	2022	Vicente Cordero
"Devil"	2022	Edwin Daboub
"Temple of Love"	2023	Justin Slade McClain
"Bleeders"	2024	Jensen Noen
"My Friends"	2024	Joshua Shultz
"Hallelujah"	2025	Marco Pavone
"Certainty"	2026	George Gallardo Kattah
"Vindicate"	2026	George Gallardo Kattah
"Cut"	2026	Max Moore
"Woe and Pain"	2026	Joshua Shultz

=== Short films ===
Title	Year	Director
Legion of the Black	2012	Patrick Fogarty

== Other appearances ==
Title	Album details
"Set the World on Fire"	Release date: June 14, 2011; Label: Reprise; Album: Transformers: Dark of the Moon – The Album
"Unbroken"	Release date: May 1, 2012; Label: Hollywood / Marvel Music; Album: Avengers Assemble: Music from and Inspired by the Motion Picture
"In the End"	Release date: February 5, 2013; Label: EMI; Album: Now That's What I Call Music! 45
