= Kerrang! Awards 2012 =

British music awards ceremony

- Sponsored by: Kerrang!
- Date: 7 June 2012
- Location: The Brewery, London
- Country: England
- Hosted by: Scott Ian; Corey Taylor

The Kerrang! Awards 2012 were held in London, England, on 7 June 2012 at The Brewery in East London and were hosted by Slipknot singer Corey Taylor and Anthrax guitarist Scott Ian.

On 2 May 2012, Kerrang! announced the 2012 nominees. The main categories were dominated by You Me at Six with five nominations, followed by Black Veil Brides and Falling in Reverse with three apiece.

The Kerrang! Awards 2012 incorporated new categories, including awards for films, video games, comedians, the hero and villain of the year.

== Winners and nominees ==
=== Best British Newcomer ===
- While She Sleeps
- Yashin
- Fearless Vampire Killers
- Don Broco
- Hawk Eyes

=== Best International Newcomer ===
- Motionless In White
- Tonight Alive
- Falling in Reverse
- Of Mice & Men
- Reckless Love

=== Best British Band ===
- You Me at Six
- Bullet for My Valentine
- Asking Alexandria
- Lostprophets
- Iron Maiden

=== Best International Band ===
- Thirty Seconds to Mars
- My Chemical Romance
- Evanescence
- A Day to Remember
- letlive.

=== Best Live Band ===
- You Me at Six
- Black Veil Brides
- Asking Alexandria
- Enter Shikari
- My Chemical Romance

=== Best Album ===
Black Veil Brides — Set the World on Fire

- You Me at Six — Sinners Never Sleep
- Enter Shikari — A Flash Flood of Colour
- Young Guns — Bones
- Mastodon — The Hunter

=== Best Single ===
- You Me at Six (featuring Oli Sykes) — "Bite My Tongue"
- You Me at Six — "No One Does it Better"
- Young Guns — "Bones"
- Black Veil Brides — "Rebel Love Song"
- Falling in Reverse — "The Drug in Me Is You"

=== Best Video ===
- Falling in Reverse — "The Drug in Me Is You"
- Mastodon — "Curl of the Burl"
- Motionless in White — "Immaculate Misconception"
- Paramore — "Monster"
- Bring Me the Horizon — "Alligator Blood"

=== Best TV Show ===
- The Big Bang Theory
- The Walking Dead
- Game of Thrones
- American Horror Story
- Misfits

=== Best Video Game ===
- The Elder Scrolls V: Skyrim
- FIFA 12
- Mass Effect 3
- Gears of War 3
- Call of Duty: Modern Warfare 3

=== Best Film ===
- The Hunger Games
- The Woman in Black
- The Inbetweeners Movie
- The Muppets
- The Girl with the Dragon Tattoo

=== Best Comedian ===
- Greg Davies
- Russell Howard
- Tim Minchin
- Noel Fielding
- Bill Bailey

=== Tweeter of the Year ===
- Danny Worsnop, Asking Alexandria
- Jono Yates, Blitz Kids
- Sean Smith, The Blackout
- Hayley Williams, Paramore
- Mark Hoppus, Blink-182

=== Hottest Female ===
- Hayley Williams, Paramore
- Tay Jardine, We Are The In Crowd
- Amy Lee, Evanescence
- Lzzy Hale, Halestorm
- Jenna McDougall, Tonight Alive

=== Hottest Male ===
- Andy Biersack, Black Veil Brides
- Ben Bruce, Asking Alexandria
- Ashley Purdy, Black Veil Brides
- Alex Gaskarth, All Time Low
- Matt Bellamy, Muse
- Christian Coma, Black Veil Brides

=== Villain of the Year ===
- Justin Bieber
- Simon Cowell
- Ronnie Radke, Falling in Reverse
- Lou Reed
- One Direction

=== Hero of the Year ===
- Ronnie Radke, Falling in Reverse
- M. Shadows, Avenged Sevenfold
- Jared Leto, Thirty Seconds to Mars
- Mario Balotelli, Manchester City F.C.
- Rou Reynolds, Enter Shikari

=== Best Festival ===
- Download Festival
- Hevy Music Festival
- Reading and Leeds Festivals
- Slam Dunk Festival
- Hit the Deck Festival

=== Kerrang! Service to Rock ===
- Tenacious D

=== Devotion Award ===
- The Blackout

=== Kerrang! Service to Metal ===
- Download Festival

=== Kerrang! Hall of Fame ===
- Machine Head

=== Kerrang! Icon ===
- Slash

=== Kerrang! Inspiration ===
- Black Sabbath

== Performances ==
=== 5 June ===
The Garage	Barfly
Skindred; Yashin; Feed the Rhino; With One Last Breath	Arcane Roots; A Plastic Rose

=== 6 June ===
The Garage

Architects
Heights
Last Witness
