= The Legacy (song) =

Single by Black Veil Brides

from the album Set the World on Fire
- Released: June 3, 2011
- Recorded: 2011
- Genre: Heavy metal; metalcore; glam metal; post-hardcore
- Length: 4:40
- Label: Lava; Universal Republic
- Songwriter: Black Veil Brides
- Producers: Josh Abraham; Lucian Walker

Black Veil Brides singles chronology
"Fallen Angels" (2011)	"The Legacy" (2011)	"Rebel Love Song" (2011)

Audio sample
- The Legacy: file; help

"The Legacy" is the fourth single by American rock band Black Veil Brides, and the second single from their second album Set the World on Fire. It was leaked on YouTube May 29 from an online radio site. It is also their first charting single, peaking at #28 on the Hot Mainstream Rock Tracks chart. The song is about the band leaving a legacy that will change the world. As lead vocalist Andy put it, "In life, everyone wants to leave a legacy. This song is about when we first started touring together as a band and the absolute love and devotion we have received from the BVB Army. Together we have created something amazing. This will be our Legacy."

== Music video ==
A music video for the song was released on YouTube on May 30, 2011, directed by Patrick Fogarty, who also directed the "Knives and Pens," "Perfect Weapon," and "Rebel Love Song" music videos. The video shows the band playing the song in a scrapyard, while fire is shooting from pipes behind them. "The Legacy" music video was subsequently released on iTunes after its YouTube debut. "The Legacy" was also featured on the CSI:NY episode "Clean Sweep," which was aired in the US on January 6, and in the UK on March 31, 2011.

== Track listing ==
CD single

No.	Title	Length
1.	"The Legacy"	4:40

== Personnel ==
Black Veil Brides

- Andy Biersack – lead vocals
- Jake Pitts – lead guitar
- Jinxx – rhythm guitar, backing vocals
- Ashley Purdy – bass, backing vocals
- Christian "CC" Coma – drums

Production

- Patrick Fogarty - music video direction

== Charts ==
Chart (2011)	Peak position
US Mainstream Rock (Billboard)	29
