= Rebels (EP) =

EP by Black Veil Brides
- Released: December 13, 2011
- Recorded: 2011
- Genre: Hard rock; heavy metal
- Length: 19:09
- Label: Lava/Universal Republic

Black Veil Brides chronology
Rebels (2011)	The Night (2019)

Rebels is the debut EP by American rock band Black Veil Brides, released exclusively through iTunes on December 13, 2011.

The EP contains three new tracks, the first one being an original song titled "Coffin", which was a left over from the group's previous album Set the World on Fire. Coffin's music video was released on June 13, 2012, to members of the BVB mailing list. It was later posted on the official Black Veil Brides website. The other two tracks are covers of the Billy Idol song "Rebel Yell" and Kiss' "Unholy", which also features Zakk Wylde playing the guitar solo. Rebels also contains a six-minute long director's cut of their music video for the song "Rebel Love Song".

The cover art for the EP was painted by Richard Villa, who also painted the cover art for We Stitch These Wounds, Set the World on Fire, Wretched and Divine: The Story of the Wild Ones and Black Veil Brides IV.

== Track listing ==
No.	Title	Writer(s)	Length
1.	"Coffin"	Black Veil Brides, with Brad Williams and Lucian Walker	4:15
2.	"Rebel Yell" (Billy Idol cover)	Billy Idol, Steve Stevens	4:38
3.	"Unholy" (Kiss cover, feat. Zakk Wylde)	Gene Simmons, Vinnie Vincent	3:25
4.	"Rebel Love Song" (six-minute director's cut music video)	Richard Villa, Patrick Fogarty	6:51
Total length:			19:09

== Critical reception ==
Professional ratings
Review scores
Source	Rating
Loudwire	4/5 stars
Alternative Press	2.5/5 stars

Rebels received mixed to positive reviews. Reviewers took note of the return of Biersack's screams that were mostly absent from Set the World on Fire. Rebels was put on the music service Spotify on December 2, 2017.

== "Coffin" music video ==
The music video for "Coffin" was shot in Los Angeles, California, and released on June 13, 2012. The video depicts that Andy has died, and people have come to remember him. Meanwhile, the band is playing in a dark, smoke-filled room. Later in the video, a woman tries to steal a necklace with the band's symbol on it. After she takes it, two women overlooking the coffin vaporize all in the room, killing everyone and leaving only the necklace. Later, Andy walks into the room lays a notebook down and closes the coffin with his body inside and disappears into thin air. At the end of the video, the notebook burns for 34 seconds.

== Personnel ==
Black Veil Brides

- Andy Biersack – lead vocals
- Jake Pitts – lead guitar
- Jinxx – rhythm guitar, violin
- Ashley Purdy – bass, backing vocals
- Christian "CC" Coma – drums, percussion

Guest artist

- Zakk Wylde – guitar solo on "Unholy"
