= Wretched and Divine: The Story of the Wild Ones =

2013 studio album by Black Veil Brides

Studio album by Black Veil Brides
- Released: January 8, 2013
- Recorded: May–September 2012
- Genres: Hard rock; heavy metal; pop metal
- Length: 51:08
- Labels: Lava; Universal Republic
- Producer: John Feldmann

Black Veil Brides chronology
Set the World on Fire (2011)	Wretched and Divine: The Story of the Wild Ones (2013)	Black Veil Brides (2014)

Singles from Wretched and Divine
- 1. "In the End" Released: October 31, 2012; 2. "Wretched and Divine" Released: January 8, 2013; 3. "We Don't Belong" Released: January 8, 2013; 4. "Revelation" Released: May 28, 2013

Ultimate edition
- Ultimate edition cover

Wretched and Divine: The Story of the Wild Ones is the third studio album by American rock band Black Veil Brides. It is a rock opera concept album that was released through Lava Records/Universal Republic Records on January 8, 2013. Pre-orders for the album became available to download from iTunes on Halloween, October 31. The track "In the End" is the album's lead single, and was offered as an instant download to everyone who pre-ordered the album from iTunes after October 31. "In the End" was featured as one of the theme songs for WWE's Hell in a Cell and was also featured as a song on the soundtrack for EA Sports' NHL 14 video game.

Black Veil Brides embarked on a North American tour, titled "The Church of the Wild Ones Tour" in support of the album, lasting from January–March 2013. In February, they took a small break from the tour to headline the Kerrang! Tour in the UK, with supporting acts Chiodos, Tonight Alive, and Fearless Vampire Killers. They returned to North America to finish off the last leg of "The Church of the Wild Ones Tour".

== Music ==
The album has been broadly described as hard rock, heavy metal, and pop metal. Elements of gothic rock, spoken word, punk rock, and symphonic music have also been noted. The album also is noted for featuring orchestration.

== Release and promotion ==
Black Veil Brides began releasing details and teasers for Wretched and Divine: The Story of the Wild Ones almost a year before the album's release date:

Guitarists Jinxx and Jake told Chris Droney in an interview for Glasswerk National that the band are constantly writing new music, and were planning on recording their next major LP in April 2012. On February 18, Jake tweeted, "Amazing stuff. This next record is going to kick your asses." In a February 2012 interview, Ashley Purdy announced that the band's third studio album was scheduled to be released towards the end of 2012.

On May 2, Black Veil Brides had this to announce: "As of today, we have officially began recording our new album which will be released on October 30th!"

Andy said in an interview at Download Festival that "We've got three songs tracked. We've set ourselves a deadline of the end of August to finish it. We've got 20 to 25 songs written and we're narrowing it down now. John Feldmann is producing it. It's going to be more of a punk rock record than anything we've done before. It's Social Distortion meets Metallica." Based on this statement, many people were led to believe that the record would literally be a punk rock album, but Biersack clarified his statement in an interview with Artisan News, stating "The intention was never to make a punk rock record. I think that... maybe I should have chosen my words better when I said that. The intention was to play on our influences a lot more and really go back to basics with how we wrote songs and focusing [sic] on the more punk rock ethic and the things that we felt early on when we were making our own merchandise; touring in a car with, you know, all of us sitting on top of each other in a U-Haul trailer; and, you know, playing in clubs on soap, like, [sic] little soapboxes and stuff... I didn't wanna make a Stiff Little Fingers record."

September 4, Biersack announced via Twitter that they had finished recording of the new album: "Well tracking has officially wrapped for the new record! Still some stuff to finish up but I'm so happy, excited & proud of this album!!"

The Wretched and Divine: The Story of the Wild Ones – Ultimate Edition CD/DVD was released on June 11, 2013.

=== Release delay ===
It was announced that the release of the album would be pushed back from October 30, 2012, to sometime in January 2013. On October 8, the album cover and album name were released, along with the announcement that pre-orders would be launched from iTunes on Halloween, October 31. The song "In the End" became available for purchase on the same date of the pre-order. On December 12, the music video for "In the End" was released on YouTube and has been viewed over 134 million times. On October 29, the band announced the official track list and release date for the album: Wretched and Divine: The Story of the Wild Ones was eventually released on January 8, 2013.

== Commercial performance ==
The album went on to sell 42,000 units in its first week, opening at number 7 in the Billboard 200, making this album the band's first top ten entry on the chart. "In the End" reached number 3 on the Billboard Rock Charts. The album reached number 1 on the iTunes Top Albums charts and the lead single, "In the End", reached number 6 on the iTunes Top Rock Songs charts.

Since its release, the album has sold in the United States over 200,000 copies as of October 8, 2014.

== Critical reception ==
Professional ratings
Aggregate scores
Source	Rating
Metacritic	64/100
Review scores
Source	Rating
AllMusic	3/5 stars
Alternative Press	3.5/5 stars
Artistdirect	5/5 stars
The Guardian	2/5 stars
Loudwire	3.5/5 stars
Under The Gun review	6/10 stars
Bracket and Bracket	95/100
Bring the Noise UK	8/10
Metal Forces	9/10

Wretched and Divine received mixed to positive reviews. It currently holds a 64/100 rating on Metacritc, a site which averages professional review scores. The album received a rating of KKKK, or excellent, from Kerrang! Magazine as well as a 5 star review of Artistdirect and a 3.5/5 review from both Loudwire and Alternative Press.

Other reviewers weren't as positive with the album, with Dom Lawson of The Guardian voicing his personal distaste of the album, although saying that existing fans will be satisfied. Some negative press was leveled at the F.E.A.R. Transmissions as well as the album's concept overall.

== Track listing ==
Act 1: Hope
No.	Title	Writer(s)	Length
1.	"Exordium"		0:25
2.	"I Am Bulletproof"	Andy Biersack, Jake Pitts, Jinxx, Ashley Purdy, John Feldmann	3:34
3.	"New Years Day"	Biersack, Pitts, Jinxx, Feldmann, Martin Johnson	3:25
4.	"F.E.A.R. Transmission 1: Stay Close"		0:35
5.	"Wretched and Divine"	Biersack, Jinxx, Purdy, Feldmann, Scott Stevens	3:37
6.	"We Don't Belong"	Biersack, Pitts, Jinxx, Feldmann, Martin Johnson	3:36
7.	"F.E.A.R. Transmission 2: Trust"		0:20
8.	"Devil's Choir"	Biersack, Pitts, Jinxx, Feldmann, Johnson	2:57
9.	"Resurrect the Sun"	Biersack, Pitts, Jinxx, Feldmann	4:34

Act 2: Faith
No.	Title	Writer(s)	Length
10.	"Overture"		1:38
11.	"Shadows Die"	Biersack, Pitts, Jinxx, Feldmann	5:25
12.	"Abeyance"		0:14
13.	"Days Are Numbered" (Featuring Bert McCracken)	Feldmann, Pitts, Jinxx, Biersack, Chris Cheney	3:40
14.	"Done for You"	Biersack, Feldmann	2:33
15.	"Nobody's Hero"	Biersack, Pitts, Jinxx, Feldmann, Purdy, Brandon Paddock	3:35
16.	"Lost It All"	Biersack, Pitts, Jinxx, Feldmann, Johnson, Purdy	5:20
17.	"F.E.A.R. Transmission 3: As War Fades"		0:58
18.	"In the End"	Biersack, Pitts, Jinxx, Feldmann, Johnson, Purdy	3:48
19.	"F.E.A.R.: Final Transmission"		0:54
Total length:			51:08

Ultimate edition bonus tracks
No.	Title	Writer(s)	Length
20.	"Revelation"	Feldmann, Biersack, Jinxx, Pitts, Purdy, Chris Mora	3:35
21.	"Victory Call"	Biersack, Pitts, Jinxx	3:34
22.	"Let You Down"	Feldmann, Biersack	3:31
Total length:			61:08

== Charts ==
Chart (2013)	Peak position
Australian Albums (ARIA)	17
Austrian Albums (Ö3 Austria)	74
Belgian Albums (Ultratop Flanders)	81
Canadian Albums (Billboard)	11
Dutch Albums (Album Top 100)	83
Irish Albums (IRMA)	76
New Zealand Albums (RMNZ)	21
Norwegian Albums (VG-lista)	39
Scottish Albums (Official Charts)	17
UK Albums (Official Charts)	20
UK Rock & Metal Albums (Official Charts)	1
US Billboard 200	7
US Top Rock Albums (Billboard)	2
US Top Hard Rock Albums (Billboard)	2

== Certifications ==
Region	Certification	Certified units/sales
United Kingdom (BPI)	Silver	60,000^{‡}
^{‡} Sales+streaming figures based on certification alone.

== Album artwork ==
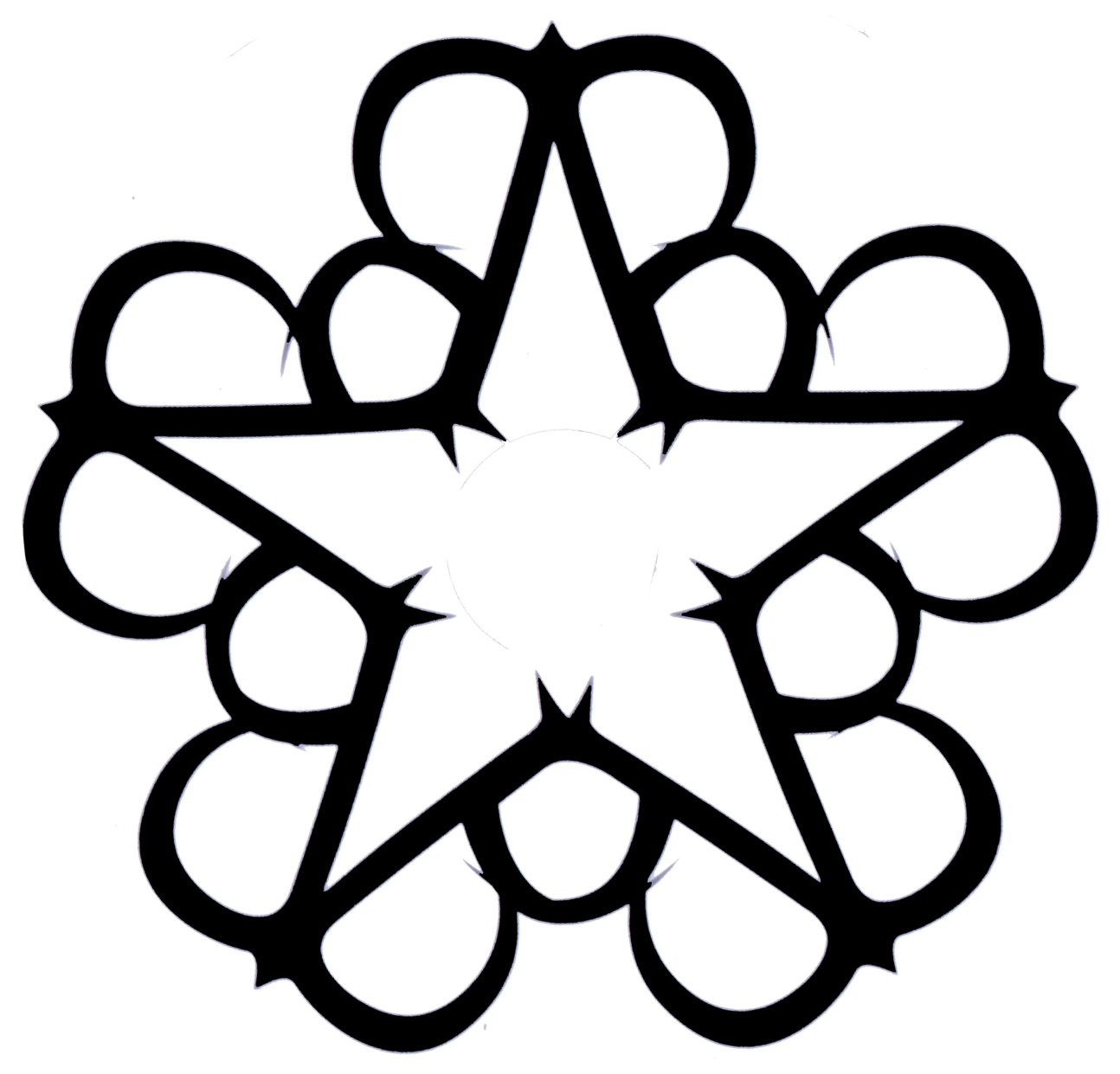
Black Veil Brides' Pentacharm symbol

The cover art for Wretched and Divine: The Story of the Wild Ones was painted by Richard Villa—long-time Black Veil Brides cover artist—who also painted the cover art for We Stitch These Wounds, "Perfect Weapon," Set the World on Fire, "Fallen Angels," and Rebels.

The cover artwork depicts a lone child—holding the Black Veil Brides pentacharm—standing up against the army of F.E.A.R., representative of a David and Goliath-style standoff. On the Ultimate Edition cover, the sky is dark and cloudy, giving more dramatic lighting.

== Film adaptation: Legion of the Black ==
Legion of the Black

Video by Black Veil Brides
- Released: December 21, 2012
- Genres: Hard rock; heavy metal; spoken word; punk rock; dystopia
- Director: Patrick Fogarty

Black Veil Brides chronology
In the End (2012)	Legion of the Black (2012)

Along with the release of the album's pre-order information, a teaser for a full-length film was posted to the band's YouTube, as well as shared through their Facebook page. The film, titled Legion of the Black, "follows a group of rebels known as "The Wild Ones" as they defend their hearts, minds and bodies against F.E.A.R.". It was screened at the Silent Movie Theater in Los Angeles, California, on December 21, December 22 and 23, 2012, and released on DVD. At the end, the voice of F.E.A.R., played by William Control, rises up and makes new soldiers, hinting at a sequel.

The Special Edition and Ultimate Edition of Wretched and Divine both include a DVD titled "BVB in the Studio: The Making of Wretched and Divine," which depicts behind-the-scenes footage of Black Veil Brides' making of the album, and in the film, Biersack tells that F.E.A.R. is an acronym which stands for "For Every and All Religion."

== Personnel ==
Credits adapted from booklet.

(DVD comes with Ultimate Edition of Wretched and Divine: The Story of the Wild Ones)

Black Veil Brides

- Andy Biersack – lead vocals
- Jake Pitts – lead guitar
- Jinxx – rhythm guitar, strings
- Ashley Purdy – bass, backing vocals
- Christian Coma – drums

Performance credits

- Brandon Hall Paddock – backing vocals, additional backing vocals, arrangements
- Tommy English – backing vocals, instrumentation, additional backing vocals
- Josh Sarles – backing vocals, instrumentation, additional backing vocals
- Aaron Edwards – additional programming for Merchants of Venice Entertainment (M.O.V.E.) (track 6)
- John Feldmann – additional orchestration, programming, instrumentation, additional backing vocals
- Roberta Freeman – additional vocals (track 16)
- Juliet Simms – additional vocals (track 16)
- Bert McCracken – additional vocals (track 13)
- Caitlin Higgins – additional backing vocals
- Mike Hart – additional backing vocals
- Jessica Manis – additional backing vocals
- Pete Beukelman – additional backing vocals
- Hannah Peskin – children's choir
- Ariana Warren – children's choir
- Martina Hemstreet – children's choir
- Ellie Posen – children's choir
- William Control – the voice of F.E.A.R.

Visuals and imagery

- Richard Villa III – illustration, design
- Glen LaFerman – photography

Technical and production

- John Feldmann – production, recording, mixing
- Brandon Hall Paddock – engineering, additional production
- Tommy English – engineering assistant, additional engineering
- Josh Sarles – engineering assistant, additional engineering
- Joe Gastwirt – mastering

Managerial

- Jason Flom – A&R
- Blasko – management for Mercenary Management, Inc.
- Dan Tsurif – management
- Nicole Schrad – management assistant
- Dina LaPolt – legal for LaPolt Law, P.C.
- Tom Reed – business management for the Affiliated Group
- Jodi Williams – business management for the Affiliated Group
- Ash Avildsen – U.S. booking for The Pantheon Group
- Jim Morewood – European booking for E.G.O.

=== Guest appearances ===
Black Veil Brides revealed through social media that several guests artists were to appear on album:

On August 27, they tweeted that William Control (Aiden) had joined them in the studio to contribute to the album: "@williamcontrol joined us #inthestudio today!" William also appeared on the set of Black Veil Brides' upcoming music video, playing as the voice of F.E.A.R. (it is to be assumed that the reason he appeared in the studio on August 27, is that he is also the voice of F.E.A.R. on the album).

On Friday, August 31, they posted a picture to their Facebook page with the caption "It's a good Friday in the studio! Our good pal Bert McCracken from The Used is throwing down some awesomeness on our album!!!" Andy also tweeted about Bert's studio visit, saying "Stoked to have @bro_mccracken in the studio today doing some vox (vocals) #BVB2013".

WWE used "In the End" as one of the official theme songs for the 2012 Hell in a Cell event.
