= Vindicate =

Studio album by Black Veil Brides
- Released: May 8, 2026
- Recorded: April 26, 2024 - July 17, 2025
- Genres: Hard rock; alternative metal
- Length: 45:42
- Label: Spinefarm
- Producers: Andy Biersack; Jake Pitts

Black Veil Brides chronology
Bleeders (2024)	Vindicate (2026)

Singles from Vindicate
- 1. "Bleeders" Released: April 26, 2024; 2. "Hallelujah" Released: July 17, 2025; 3. "Certainty" Released: January 8, 2026; 4. "Vindicate" Released: March 19, 2026; 5. "Revenger" Released: April 23, 2026; 6. "Cut" Released: May 7, 2026

Professional ratings
Review scores
Source	Rating
AllMusic	3/5 stars
Blabbermouth.net	8.5/10
Kerrang!	4/5

Vindicate is the seventh studio album by American rock band Black Veil Brides, released on May 8, 2026, through Spinefarm Records. The album marks a shift in the band’s sound, embracing a heavier, more modern style characterized by increased use of breakdowns, screamed vocals from Biersack, and lower seven-string guitar tunings.

== Track listing ==
Vindicate track listing
No.	Title	Lyrics	Music	Length
1.	"Invocation to the Muse"	Andy Biersack	Biersack; Jeremy Ferguson	2:15
2.	"Vindicate"	Biersack	Biersack; Jake Pitts; Ben Bruce; Paul Bartolome	3:01
3.	"Certainty"	Biersack	Biersack; Pitts	3:28
4.	"Bleeders"	Biersack; Pitts; Erik Ron	Biersack; Pitts; Ron	4:35
5.	"Hallelujah"	Biersack	Biersack; Pitts	4:14
6.	"Cut" (featuring Lilith Czar)	Biersack	Biersack; Pitts; Bruce; Bartolome	4:00
7.	"Alive"	Biersack	Biersack; Pitts	3:20
8.	"Purgatory (Overture IV)"	Instrumental	Biersack; Ferguson; Pitts	2:07
9.	"Revenger" (featuring Machine Head)	Biersack	Biersack; Pitts; Bruce; Bartolome	3:41
10.	"Sorrow"	Biersack	Biersack; Pitts; Bruce; Bartolome	4:31
11.	"Grace (Interlude)"	Instrumental	Ferguson	1:15
12.	"Ave Maria"	Biersack	Biersack; Pitts	3:27
13.	"Woe & Pain"	Biersack	Biersack; Pitts	4:02
14.	"Eschaton"	Biersack	Biersack; Pitts	1:46
Total length:				45:42

Digital edition bonus track
No.	Title	Lyrics	Music	Length
15.	"Death of Seasons" (AFI cover)	David Marchand	Hunter Burgan; Adam Carson; Marchand; Jade Puget	3:54

=== Note ===
- On physical editions of the album, "Purgatory (Overture IV)" is stylized as "Purgatory (Overture IIII)"

== Personnel ==
Credits are adapted from the album's liner notes and Tidal.

=== Black Veil Brides ===
- Andy Biersack – lead vocals (tracks 1–7, 9, 10, 12–15), production (1–3, 5–15)
- Jake Pitts – lead guitar (all tracks); production, engineering (1–3, 5–15), bass guitar (3, 5, 15)
- Lonny Eagleton (Note: Eagleton is credited as a member of the band in the album's liner notes, but is not attributed to any contributions on Tidal.)
- Jinxx – rhythm guitar
- Christian Coma – drums

=== Additional contributors ===
- Zakk Cervini – mixing, mastering (1–3, 5–15)
- Spencer Bradham – engineering (1–3, 5–14)
- Jeff Dunne – production, mixing, mastering (4)
- Erik Ron – production (4)
- Lilith Czar – lead vocals (6)
- Robb Flynn – lead vocals (9, 10, 12–14)
- Richard Villa – cover illustration
- Brandon Stecz – design
- Jonathan Weiner – photography

== Charts ==
Chart performance for Vindicate
Chart (2026)	Peak position
Australian Albums (ARIA)	19
Belgian Albums (Ultratop Flanders)	63
Belgian Albums (Ultratop Wallonia)	72
French Albums (SNEP)	186
French Rock & Metal Albums (SNEP)	6
German Albums (Offizielle Top 100)	72
German Rock & Metal Albums (Offizielle Top 100)	18
Japanese Download Albums (Billboard Japan)	77
Scottish Albums (Official Charts)	15
UK Albums (Official Charts)	72
UK Rock & Metal Albums (Official Charts)	2
US Billboard 200	159
US Independent Albums (Billboard)	22
US Top Rock & Alternative Albums (Billboard)	41
