= Vale (album) =

Studio album by Black Veil Brides
- Released: January 12, 2018
- Recorded: 2016–2017
- Studio: Foxy Studios, Los Angeles, California
- Genre: Hard rock; heavy metal
- Length: 46:37
- Label: Lava; Republic
- Producer: John Feldmann; Jake Pitts

Black Veil Brides chronology
| Black Veil Brides (2014) | Vale (2018) | Re-Stitch These Wounds (2020) |

Singles from Vale
- 1. "The Outsider" Released: December 21, 2016; 2. "My Vow" Released: September 28, 2017; 3. "When They Call My Name" Released: November 3, 2017; 4. "The Last One" Released: December 22, 2017; 5. "Wake Up" Released: January 12, 2018

Vale is the fifth studio album by American rock band Black Veil Brides, released on January 12, 2018, through Lava Records/Republic Records. It is a prequel to their previous concept album Wretched and Divine: The Story of the Wild Ones. It is their final album to feature bassist Ashley Purdy before his split with the band in November 2019 as well as their final album to be released through Lava and Republic Records.

== Track listing ==
| No. | Title | Writer(s) | Length |
|---|---|---|---|
| 1. | "Incipiens Ad Finem" | Andy Biersack | 0:21 |
| 2. | "The Last One" | Biersack, John Feldmann, Jake Pitts, Jinxx, Matt Pauling, Zakk Cervini | 4:41 |
| 3. | "Wake Up" | Biersack, Feldmann, Pitts, Jinxx, Calum Hood, Michael Clifford, Pauling, Cervini | 2:42 |
| 4. | "When They Call My Name" | Biersack, Feldmann, Pitts, Jinxx, Pauling, Cervini | 3:45 |
| 5. | "The Outsider" | Biersack, Feldmann, Pitts, Jinxx, Pauling, Cervini | 3:46 |
| 6. | "Dead Man Walking (Overture II)" | Biersack, Feldmann, Pitts, Jinxx, Pauling, Cervini | 8:34 |
| 7. | "Our Destiny" | Biersack, Pitts, Jinxx, Feldmann, Pauling, Cervini, Nicholas Furlong | 3:24 |
| 8. | "The King of Pain" | Biersack, Feldmann, Pitts, Jinxx, Pauling, Cervini | 4:30 |
| 9. | "My Vow" | Biersack, Feldmann, Pitts, Jinxx, Pauling, Cervini | 2:48 |
| 10. | "Ballad of the Lonely Hearts" | Biersack, Feldmann, Pitts, Jinxx, Pauling, Cervini | 3:51 |
| 11. | "Throw the First Stone" | Biersack, Feldmann, Pitts, Jinxx, Pauling, Cervini | 4:05 |
| 12. | "Vale (This Is Where It Ends)" | Biersack, Feldmann, Pitts, Jinxx, Pauling, Cervini | 4:10 |
| Total length: | | | 46:37 |

== Personnel ==
Black Veil Brides

- Andy Biersack – lead vocals
- Jake Pitts – lead guitar, co-producer
- Jeremy 'Jinxx' Ferguson – rhythm guitar, keyboards, orchestration, backing vocals
- Ashley Purdy – bass, backing vocals
- Christian "CC" Coma – drums, percussion

Production

- John Feldmann – production, recording at Foxy Studios, Los Angeles, CA
- Zakk Cervini – engineering, digital editing, additional production, mixing at Foxy Studios, Los Angeles, CA
- Matt Pauling – mixing at Foxy Studios, Los Angeles, CA
- Ted Jensen – mastering at Sterling Sound, New York, NY

Artwork

- Richard Villa III – cover illustration
- Alberto Erazo – packaging design
- Jonathan Weiner – photography

== Charts ==
| Chart (2018) | Peak position |
|---|---|
| Australian Albums (ARIA) | 13 |
| Austrian Albums (Ö3 Austria) | 29 |
| Belgian Albums (Ultratop Flanders) | 74 |
| Belgian Albums (Ultratop Wallonia) | 154 |
| Canadian Albums (Billboard) | 13 |
| Czech Albums (ČNS IFPI) | 66 |
| Dutch Albums (Album Top 100) | 158 |
| German Albums (Offizielle Top 100) | 55 |
| Hungarian Albums (MAHASZ) | 39 |
| New Zealand Heatseeker Albums (RMNZ) | 3 |
| Scottish Albums (OCC) | 21 |
| Spanish Albums (Promusicae) | 63 |
| Swiss Albums (Schweizer Hitparade) | 51 |
| UK Albums (OCC) | 23 |
| UK Rock & Metal Albums (OCC) | 1 |
| US Billboard 200 | 14 |
| US Top Hard Rock Albums (Billboard) | 1 |
| US Top Rock Albums (Billboard) | 2 |
