= Knives and Pens =

2009 single by Black Veil Brides

Single by Black Veil Brides

from the album We Stitch These Wounds
- Released: June 17, 2009
- Genre: Metalcore; emo
- Length: 4:15
- Label: Self-released
- Songwriter: Black Veil Brides

Black Veil Brides singles chronology
"Knives and Pens" (2009)	"Perfect Weapon" (2010)

"Knives and Pens" is a song by American rock band Black Veil Brides, released as a music video exclusively on YouTube. It is their first single, and is one of their most popular songs to date, with the music video reaching over 100 million views on YouTube.

== Other versions ==
"Knives and Pens (Acoustic)"

Single by Black Veil Brides

from the album We Stitch These Wounds
- Released: 2010 (limited copies), March 19, 2013
- Recorded: Clear Lake Audio, North Hollywood, CA
- Genre: Acoustic rock
- Length: 4:50
- Label: StandBy Records
- Songwriter: Black Veil Brides

Black Veil Brides singles chronology
"In the End" (2012)	"Knives and Pens (Acoustic)" (2010)

The song was re-recorded and re-released as two new versions—a version with a few vocal and guitar changes, and a limited edition Hot Topic acoustic version—alongside the songs "We Stitch These Wounds" and "The Mortician's Daughter" on their debut studio album, We Stitch These Wounds. The limited-copy acoustic version was re-released by StandBy Records to the general public for download on March 19, 2013.

== Song information and background ==
=== Meaning behind "Knives and Pens" ===
The lyrics were written by Black Veil Brides vocalist Andy Biersack around the title "Knives and Pens" which, according to him describes a choice: Knives — destruction (as in harming yourself), and Pens — creation (as in the choice he decided to make to begin writing music and make something of their life). Black Veil Brides is saying in this song that “if you make good choices in life, you can rise above and conquer whatever troubles you may come across.”

=== Intro clip ===
The clip at the beginning of the original version of the song is from the documentary Paradise Lost: The Child Murders at Robin Hood Hills. It was taken from a recording of one of the West Memphis Three trials. The transcription of the clip is as follows:

Prosecutor - "In looking at young people involved in the occult, do you see any particular type of dress?" Witness - "I have personally observed people wearing black fingernails, having their hair painted black, wearing black t-shirts... Sometimes they will tattoo themselves."

== Music video ==
The official music video for the song was released on YouTube on June 17, 2009, directed by Patrick Fogarty, who later directed the "Perfect Weapon," "The Legacy," "Rebel Love Song," and "Coffin" music videos. The video stars actor David Sasik, who is playing the role of the kid resembling Andy. It was a very low-budget project, but despite this, the video launched the band into international fame. The official video has reached over 141 million views on YouTube as of September 9, 2024.

=== Video plot ===
The music video depicts a scenario similar to Andy's years in school, where he was bullied for the way he dressed, looked, and the music he listened to.

A boy walks to his school locker and sees papers taped to it that have hurtful messages written on them, such as "emo", "fag", and "kill yourself". He rips them down and throws them to the ground in anger. Even his brother bullies him, stealing his notebook that he writes lyrics inspired by his feelings of anger in. He goes home angry, but his brother eventually comes in and returns his notebook. He then proceeds to begin writing the lyrics to "Knives and Pens". He also is seen watching the video of Black Veil Brides playing the song and there are clips of the band playing with occasionally dressing in white and occasionally dressing in black.

=== Acoustic version video ===
Black Veil Brides released a lyric video for the acoustic version of "Knives and Pens" on March 20, 2013, through StandBy Records

== Track listing ==
CD single [1st version]

No.	Title	Length
1.	"Knives and Pens" (Original Version)	4:24

CD single [2nd version]

No.	Title	Length
1.	"Knives and Pens" (Original Version)	4:24
2.	"Knives and Pens" (Album Version)	4:15

Acoustic single

No.	Title	Length
1.	"Knives and Pens" (Acoustic)	4:50

== Personnel ==
Black Veil Brides (studio band)

- Andy Biersack – lead vocals, keyboards
- Gianna Cianci – backing vocals
- Johnny Herold – lead guitar
- Nate Shipp – rhythm guitar, backing vocals
- Phil Cenedella – bass
- Chris "Craven" Riesenberg - drums

Music video band/production

- Andy Biersack – vocals
- Gianna Cianci - screams
- Chris "Hollywood" Bluser – guitar
- Sandra Alvarenga – drums
- David Sasik – leading actor
- Patrick Fogarty – director
