= In the End (Black Veil Brides song) =

Single by Black Veil Brides

from the album Wretched and Divine: The Story of the Wild Ones
- Released: October 31, 2012
- Recorded: May–September 2012
- Genre: Heavy metal
- Length: 3:48
- Label: Lava/Universal Republic
- Songwriter: Black Veil Brides

Black Veil Brides singles chronology
"Rebel Love Song" (2011)	"In the End" (2012)	"Heart of Fire" (2014)

"In the End" is a song by American rock band Black Veil Brides, from their third studio album, Wretched and Divine: The Story of the Wild Ones. The song was released on October 31, 2012, as the first single from Wretched and Divine, and is Black Veil Brides' sixth single. It was released on the same date as the availability for pre-order purchases for the entire album. The song peaked at number 39 on the Billboard Rock Songs chart and remained on the charts for two weeks. "In the End" was featured as a bonus track on the compilation album Now That's What I Call Music! 45. It was also one of the two themes for the 2012 WWE Hell in a Cell pay-per-view event. The song also appears in the video games Guitar Hero Live and NHL 14. The band received Revolver's 2013 Golden Gods Award for Best New Song for "In the End." The song was written after the death of Black Veil Brides' lead vocalist Andy Biersack's grandfather.

== Background ==
The inspiration for this song was the death of Andy Biersack's grandfather. In an interview with Kerrang! magazine Andy Biersack said the following:

"I was very close to him. Every day after school, I would go to his house and talk. (During the funeral) people were talking about my grandfather go into Heaven, and how wonderful person he was. I started to think about what heaven is... I hope I'm wrong, and I hope he is in the clouds, but on a personal level, I was thinking of the importance this person had to all these people at the church. If nothing else, Heaven is a legacy that you leave with the people around you. If there was a place that is Heaven, that's wonderful. But people telling the story of your life after you've lived it, those are the people who create that afterlife you have and continue this legacy."

== Music video ==
Black Veil Brides released a music video for the song through YouTube on December 12, 2012. The music video features the band playing in different places that were used in their feature film, "Legion of the Black". Andy Biersack described the video as "a trailer" to the movie. The band plays on a salt lake bed, a church, and an abandoned oil factory.

== Track listing ==
CD single

No.	Title	Length
1.	"In the End"	3:48
2.	"Heart Of Fire"	4:21
Total length:		8:09

== Personnel ==
Black Veil Brides

- Andy Biersack – lead vocals
- Jake Pitts – lead guitar
- Jinxx – rhythm guitar, violin, cello, backing vocals
- Ashley Purdy – bass, backing vocals
- Christian "CC" Coma – drums

Production

- Patrick Fogarty - director

The song was also available on Guitar Hero Live as one of the 200 online launch song titles, along with the song Fallen Angels from the band's second album Set the World on Fire. In addition, a live version of the song from the band's Alive and Burning concert DVD was available in this game as DLC.

== Charts ==
=== Weekly charts ===
Weekly chart performance for "In the End"
Chart (2012–2013)	Peak position
UK Rock & Metal (OCC)	4
US Hot Rock & Alternative Songs (Billboard)	39
US Rock Airplay (Billboard)	35

=== Year-end charts ===
Year-end chart performance for "In the End"
Chart (2013)	Position
US Hot Rock Songs (Billboard)	82

== Certifications ==
Certifications for "In the End"
Region	Certification	Certified units/sales
Brazil (Pro-Música Brasil)	Gold	30,000^{‡}
United Kingdom (BPI)	Silver	200,000^{‡}
United States (RIAA)	Platinum	1,000,000^{‡}
^{‡} Sales+streaming figures based on certification alone.
