= We Stitch These Wounds =

Studio album by Black Veil Brides
- Released: July 20, 2010
- Recorded: December 2009–April 2010
- Studios: Clear Lake Audio, North Hollywood, California
- Genres: Metalcore; post-hardcore
- Length: 42:38
- Labels: StandBy; Virgin
- Producers: Blasko; G. Preston Boebel; Josh Newell

Black Veil Brides chronology
We Stitch These Wounds (2010)	Set the World on Fire (2011)

Singles from We Stitch These Wounds
- 1. "Knives and Pens" Released: June 17, 2009; 2. "Perfect Weapon" Released: June 8, 2010

Professional ratings
Review scores
Source	Rating
AllMusic	3.5/5 stars

We Stitch These Wounds is the debut studio album by American rock band Black Veil Brides, released through StandBy Records on July 20, 2010. It is Black Veil Brides' only studio album to feature drummer Sandra Alvarenga before she departed in late 2010 to join the band Modern Day Escape.

== Release and promotion ==
In December 2009, Andy Sixx announced that the recording of their first album had begun. Simultaneously, they announced manager turned producer, "Blasko", current Rob Zombie and former Ozzy Osbourne bassist, taking the reins, and producer/engineers G. Preston Boebel and Josh Newell taking care of the technical side of the record making process.

== Track listing ==
Standard Edition
No.	Title	Writer(s)	Length
1.	"The Outcasts (Call to Arms)" (featuring Urban Flanders {Biersack's Grandfather})	Andy Biersack	0:31
2.	"We Stitch These Wounds"	Biersack, Jake Pitts	3:59
3.	"Beautiful Remains"	Biersack, Pitts, Jinxx	4:13
4.	"Children Surrender"	Biersack, Pitts, Jinxx	3:11
5.	"Perfect Weapon"	Biersack, Pitts, Jinxx	4:07
6.	"Knives and Pens"	Biersack, Chris Stewart, Pitts, Jinxx	4:15
7.	"The Mortician's Daughter"	Biersack	4:11
8.	"All Your Hate"	Biersack, Pitts	3:10
9.	"Heaven's Calling"	Biersack, Pitts, Jinxx	3:19
10.	"Never Give In"	Biersack, Pitts, Jinxx	3:09
11.	"Sweet Blasphemy"	Biersack, Pitts, Jinxx	3:56
12.	"Carolyn"	Biersack, Pitts	4:37
Total length:			42:38

Hot Topic bonus track
No.	Title	Writer(s)	Length
13.	"Knives and Pens" (Acoustic Version)	Biersack, Stewart, Pitts, Jinxx	4:51

== Chart performance and reception ==
The album sold nearly 11,000 copies in its first week, reaching the position of #36 of the Chart Billboard 200 and #1 Independent Release, despite receiving mixed to negative reviews, with most critics taking note of Andy's monotonous voice, making him only able to sing in one octave. One critic at www.sputnikmusic.com ended his review saying, "Hey, at least kids got over BrokeNCYDE." Another common criticism was the riff similarities between "Knives and Pens" by Black Veil Brides and "Unholy Confessions" by Avenged Sevenfold.

Chart (2010–2011)	Peak position
UK Rock & Metal Albums (OCC)	20
US Billboard 200	36
US Top Rock Albums (Billboard)	10
US Top Hard Rock Albums (Billboard)	3

== Certifications ==
Region	Certification	Certified units/sales
United Kingdom (BPI)	Silver	60,000^{‡}
^{‡} Sales+streaming figures based on certification alone.

== Album information ==
=== Album artwork ===
The album cover for We Stitch These Wounds was painted by Richard Villa (who also painted the artwork for Set the World on Fire, "Fallen Angels," Rebels, and Wretched and Divine: The Story of the Wild Ones) and features a Victorian style painting of Black Veil Brides' lead vocalist Andy Biersack stitching a wound on his lip.

=== Track information ===
The opening track "The Outcasts (Call to Arms)" features Andy's grandfather, Urban P. Flanders, and the track is also used at the beginning of the "Perfect Weapon" music video.

Three of the songs—"We Stitch These Wounds," "Knives and Pens," and "The Mortician's Daughter"—had been previously self-released on their EP, Never Give In, but were re-recorded and re-released. "The Mortician's Daughter" didn't change much, "Knives and Pens" had a small change in the melody transitioning to the chorus and a guitar solo was added, but the most noticeable difference amongst the redone tracks can be heard on the song "We Stitch These Wounds," with different melodies, accompaniments, a long guitar solo, and a minor lyrical change, making it sound like an entirely different song altogether.

== Re-recording ==
In celebration of the 10th-year anniversary of the original album, a re-recorded studio album titled Re-Stitch These Wounds was released through Sumerian Records on July 31, 2020. Featuring completely reworked recordings of the original tracks, the band stated that the new release more accurately represents what they were trying to accomplish.

== Personnel ==
Black Veil Brides

- Andy Sixx – lead vocals
- Jake Pitts – lead guitar
- Jinxx – rhythm guitar, violin, backing vocals
- Ashley Purdy – bass, backing vocals
- Sandra Alvarenga – drums

Production

- Blasko – producer
- G. Preston Boebel – producer, engineer, mixing
- Dave Casey – sound design
- Josh Newell – producer, engineer, mixing
- Troy Roe – main background vocals

Additional personnel

- Urban Flanders – spoken word on "The Outcasts (Call to Arms)"
