= Rebel Love Song =

Single by Black Veil Brides

from the album Set the World on Fire
- Released: 2011
- Length: 3:57
- Label: Lava; Universal Republic
- Songwriter(s): Black Veil Brides
- Producer(s): Josh Abraham; Lucien Walker

Black Veil Brides singles chronology
"The Legacy" (2011)	"Rebel Love Song" (2011)	"In the End" (2012)

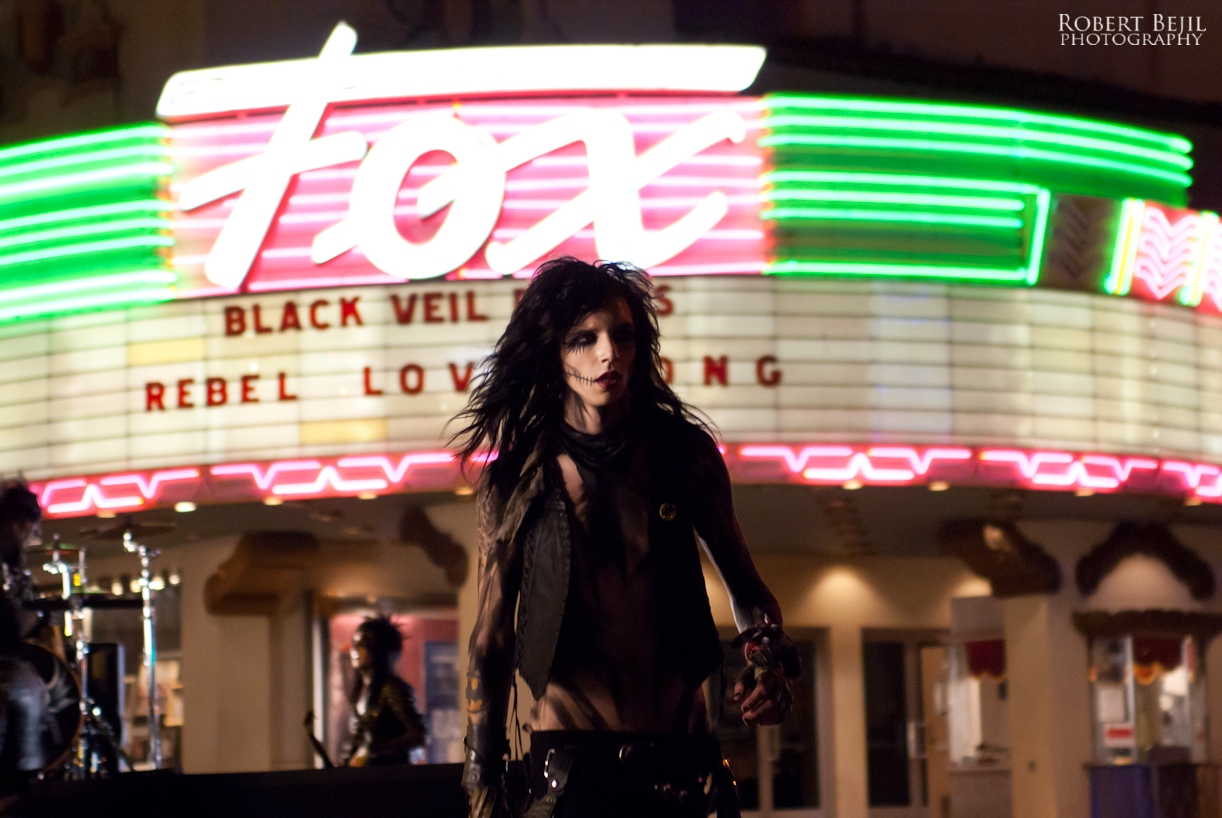
Andy Biersack during the making of the video

"Rebel Love Song" is the fifth single by American rock band Black Veil Brides, and the third and final single from their second album Set the World on Fire. Lead vocalist Andy Biersack explained the meaning of the song in an interview with Kerrang! magazine: "That song is about the idea of finding something that you can run to, about making that Utopian society in your head and doing what you can to bust out and get there." The song won the Kerrang! Award for Best Single.

== Music video ==
A music video for the song was released on YouTube on October 19, 2011, directed by Patrick Fogarty, who also directed the "Knives and Pens," "Perfect Weapon," "The Legacy," "Coffin", and other Black Veil Brides music videos. A majority of the music video was shot in front of the Fox Theater in Bakersfield, California. A six-minute director's cut of the video was released on iTunes on their second EP, Rebels. The music video depicts a couple who rebel against the girl's father by sneaking out and running away. The video also shows a fight, but doesn't give much explaining. In the director's cut version, it is revealed that the girl's name is Marilyn, and that she didn't know the man, or his name before that day, but she doesn't want to wait for her dad to pick her up, so she goes for a drive with him. They go out and see a movie. After that, he offers to take her back home, but she insists on dropping her off at the park so her dad doesn't see him. She gets out, and begins walking across the park, when three unknown men confront her and try to attack her, tearing her shirt. All of a sudden, the man she met jumps out and attacks them, and a fight ensues (which is the unexplained fight in the original video). She runs back home and bangs on the door, and her father comes out. He grows furious, and has an alcoholic beverage in his hand, which implies that he is drunk. The man drives up, and her father slaps her face and yells at her to get inside the house. Her father then yells at him, and goes back inside to deal with his daughter, but she escapes out the window and runs to the man's car and they drive away, then Black Veil Brides begin to play the song in front of the same movie theater that the couple went to at the beginning of the video. At the very end of the video, it shows that Marilyn and her new boyfriend sent her father a photo of her kissing him, and her boyfriend giving her dad the finger (which is censored out in television airings and the director's cut). Marilyn's boyfriend's name is never revealed.

== Track listing ==
CD single

No.	Title	Length
1.	"Rebel Love Song"	3:57

== Personnel ==
Black Veil Brides

- Andy Biersack – Lead vocals
- Jake Pitts – lead guitar
- Jinxx – rhythm guitar, backing vocals
- Ashley Purdy – bass, backing vocals
- Christian "CC" Coma – drums

Music video production

- Patrick Fogarty - director
