= Black Veil Brides (album) =

Studio album by Black Veil Brides
- Released: October 27, 2014
- Studio: Steakhouse Studios, North Hollywood, Los Angeles, CA; Paradise Studios, Hollywood, CA; The Warehouse, Vancouver, British Columbia, Canada
- Genre: Heavy metal; hard rock; metalcore
- Length: 44:02 (47:36 with bonus track)
- Label: Lava; Republic
- Producer: Bob Rock

Black Veil Brides chronology
Wretched and Divine: The Story of the Wild Ones (2013)	Black Veil Brides (2014)	Vale (2018)

Singles from Black Veil Brides
- 1. "Heart of Fire" Released: September 8, 2014; 2. "Faithless" Released: September 10, 2014; 3. "Goodbye Agony" Released: October 31, 2014

Black Veil Brides, also known as Black Veil Brides IV, is the fourth studio album by American rock band Black Veil Brides. It was released through Lava Records/Republic Records on October 27, 2014. The first track on the album, "Heart of Fire", was aired on BBC Radio 1's Rock Show in September, then "Faithless" was uploaded onto YouTube on September 10. Also, as of September 16, 2014, the album was released on iTunes for pre-order. Clips of the songs "Devil in the Mirror" and "Goodbye Agony" were posted on YouTube on the 18th and 19th, as well as "Goodbye Agony" airing on BBC Radio 1's Rock Show on the same day of its uploading. The music video for "Goodbye Agony" was released on October 31, 2014.

== Release and reception ==
Professional ratings
Review scores
Source	Rating
Allmusic	2.5/5 stars
Music Connection	3/10

The album debuted at number 10 on the Billboard 200 chart, making it the band's second consecutive album to debut in the top 10. The album reached 13 on the Canadian Albums Chart and also charted in the United Kingdom at 17. The album received mixed reviews from critics.

== Track listing ==
No.	Title	Writer(s)	Length
1.	"Heart of Fire"	Andy Biersack, Justin Cordle, Mark Holman, Jake Pitts, Jinxx	3:21
2.	"Faithless"	Biersack, Tommy English, Nick Long, Pitts, Christian Coma	4:48
3.	"Devil in the Mirror"	Biersack, English, Josh Moran, Pitts, Jinxx	3:30
4.	"Goodbye Agony"	Biersack, Scott Stevens, Pitts, Jinxx, Coma	4:09
5.	"World of Sacrifice"	Biersack, Ashley Purdy, Stevens, Pitts, Jinxx, Coma	3:30
6.	"Last Rites"	Biersack, Purdy, Long, Pitts, Jinxx, Coma	3:33
7.	"Stolen Omen"	Biersack, Pitts, Jinxx	3:48
8.	"Walk Away"	Biersack, Marti Frederiksen, Holman, Pitts, Jinxx	5:57
9.	"Drag Me to the Grave"	Biersack, Chris Greatti, Purdy, English, Moran, Pitts	3:45
10.	"The Shattered God"	Biersack, English, Steve Aiello, Pitts, Jinxx	4:03
11.	"Crown of Thorns"	Biersack, Holman, Pitts, Jinxx	3:39
Total length:			44:02

Best Buy Bonus Track
No.	Title	Writer(s)	Length
12.	"Sons of Night"	Holman, Rich Redmond, Jinxx, Biersack, Pitts	3:34

== Personnel ==
Black Veil Brides

- Andy Biersack - lead vocals
- Jake Pitts - lead guitar
- Jeremy 'Jinxx' Ferguson - rhythm guitar, backing vocals, violin
- Ashley Purdy - bass, backing vocals
- Christian 'CC' Coma - drums, percussion

Additional musicians

- Marc LaFrance, David Steele, Angie Fisher, Nikki Grier and Tiffany Loren - additional background vocals
- John Webster - additional keyboards

Production

- Bob Rock - production, mixing, engineering
- Jake Pitts - engineering
- Eric Helmkamp - mixing assistant, engineering
- Ryan Enockson, Adam Greenholtz and Ken Eisennagel - assistant engineering
- Ted Jensen - mastering at Sterling Sound, New York, NY
- Jason Flom - A&R

Management

- Blasko (Mercenary Management, Inc.) - management
- Dan Tsurif and Nicole Schrad - management assistants
- Dina LaPolt (LaPolt Law, P.C.) - legal representation
- Tom Reed and Jodi Williams (Affiliated Group) - business management
- Tim Borror and Ash Avildsen (The Agency Group) - U.S. booking
- Geoff Meall (The Agency Group) - European booking

Artwork

- Richard Villa III - illustration and design
- Jonathan Weiner - photography

== Charts ==
Chart (2014)	Peak position
Australian Albums (ARIA)	23
Austrian Albums (Ö3 Austria)	48
Belgian Albums (Ultratop Flanders)	104
Canadian Albums (Billboard)	13
Dutch Albums (Album Top 100)	82
German Albums (Offizielle Top 100)	75
UK Albums (OCC)	17
US Billboard 200	10
US Top Rock Albums (Billboard)	2
US Top Hard Rock Albums (Billboard)	2

=== Year-end charts ===
Chart (2014)	Position
US Top Hard Rock Albums	32
