= Yashin (band) =

British post-hardcore band

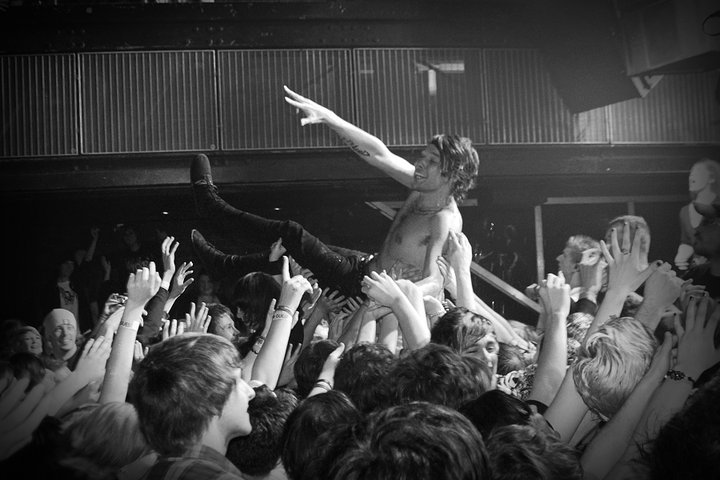
- Kevin Miles crowdsurfing in Glasgow

Background information
- Origin: Greenock, Scotland
- Genres: Post-hardcore; screamo; pop-punk; metalcore
- Years active: 2006–2016
- Past members: Harry Radford; Kevin Miles; Paul Travers; Andrew McShane; David Beaton; Connor Macleod; Michael Rice; Lewis Millen

Yashin were a Scottish post-hardcore band formed in Glasgow in 2006. They toured with bands including Limp Bizkit, Papa Roach, Black Veil Brides and Madina Lake, and played at Download Festival, T in the Park and Sonisphere.

== History ==
=== Early years (2006–2009) ===
The band was founded by school friends: Rick Shiels (bassist) and Paul Charles Travers (guitarist) in Greenock. They named themselves Yashin as guitarist Paul Travers got nicknamed Yashin at school after the famous Russian goalkeeper Lev Yashin. Original vocalist Michael Rice joined the band as he had similar tastes in music to Andrew and they met whilst studying at University. The search for a drummer was a success when David Beaton arrived on the scene, Rick chatted to David at one of the TBreak gigs at King Tut's, where both musicians played with their respective bands. But when the vacancy for the Yashin drummer became available Rick hunted David down. Once David had cemented his place in Yashin, he then in turn introduced the band to ex-school friend and guitarist Lewis Millen and Yashin was born.

Yashin quickly built up a following (Thanks to fellow Scottish band Flood of Red who took Yashin on the road). Yashin then released two EPs in 2008: Pay to Play and Miles Away But Getting Closer. Original vocalist Michael Rice announced his decision to leave the band in October 2008. During this transitional period, Yashin had booked a tour-swap with Swedish band Her Bright Skies and for the UK leg of the tour Deaf Havana frontmen: James Veck-Gilodi and Ryan Mellor came and fronted the band and raised the energy of the live shows. On the return leg of the tour in Sweden Jordan Spiers from Flood of Red came and filled in on vocals with the band to help Yashin out.

After a brief audition process the band chose to replace Rice with two vocalists, American born clean vocalist, Harry Radford of Priesthill and Scottish screamer/ singer, Kevin Miles of East Kilbride. The new line up embarked on a nine date UK tour in April 2009 supporting Madina Lake, The Audition and fellow friends Flood of Red. Yashin then continued to tour for most of the year in the UK and Europe before commencing recording their debut album Put Your Hands Where I Can See Them, with Romesh Dodangoda at Long Wave Studios in November 2009. The band played their biggest headline show (at the time) on 5 December 2009, selling out The Garage in their home town of Glasgow.

=== Put Your Hands Where I Can See Them (2010–2011) ===
Yashin released their debut album, Put Your Hands Where I Can See Them, on 1 February 2010, which included a fan-favourite cover of "Everytime" by Britney Spears. In March 2010, the band headed out on a gruelling 38 date tour supporting Glamour of the Kill, where the sextet made new friends in the Yorkshire metallers. In December 2010 the band toured the UK supporting Emarosa, and on 31 January 2011, the band had the chance to open for A Day to Remember while playing the O_{2} Academy in Glasgow, as part of their European tour.

In March 2011, the band toured the UK in support of The Red Jumpsuit Apparatus, with Yashin headlining and selling out 3 of the biggest dates on the tour in Leeds, Newcastle and Glasgow.

2011 Saw Yashin play 2nd Stage at Donington Download festival. They also played the Honour over Glory Stage at Slam Dunk festival along with Deaf Havana, We Are The Ocean and While She Sleeps. On 16–17 July 2011, the band then supported their childhood heroes Papa Roach on two shows in London's O_{2} Shepherd's Bush Empire and Sheffield's O_{2} Academy, the US band's only two appearances in the UK for 2011. Yashin also went to mainland Europe with Papa Roach and played in Germany, Prague and Switzerland.

In June 2011, the band went on to support Korn at Glasgow's O_{2} Academy and play Download Festival at Donington and Nova Rock Festival in Austria. They then supported Black Veil Brides during their 2011 autumn UK and European tour, along with My Passion, to critical acclaim. The band supported The Blackout on 16 December, for their first show in Liverpool of their 'Christmas Hope Tour'.

=== We Created A Monster (2012–2016) ===
Amongst the winter dates with Black Veil Brides and The Blackout, the band had been writing for their second studio album and demoing tracks with Tantrum To Blind guitarist and producer Simon Janlov.

On 27 February, the band announced that their new single "New Year or New York" would be released as a digital download single on Monday 5 March and also a limited edition signed CD. They also announced a new version of their debut album Put Your Hands Where I Can See Them called Put Your Hands Where I Can See Them: Revolution which includes songs from their second EP Miles Away But Getting Closer re-recorded with vocalists Harry and Kevin in the style they have been performing on stage for the last 3 years. To those who pre-ordered the new single a link is activated which allows them to view the new music video for "New Year or New York".

The band embarked upon a tour in March 2012 known as 'The Last One Standing Tour' featuring support from Jody Has A Hitlist, With One Last Breath and Tantrum To Blind, this tour included selling out London's Underworld, a sellout Manchester Club Academy and Yashin stepped up to another bigger venue in Glasgow: the Arches, which was then the band's biggest headline show to date.

2012 also saw Yashin headline the Jägermeister stage at Download Festival, as well as supporting Limp Bizkit in London, Germany, The Netherlands and the Czech Republic. Yashin also played some more shows with Black Veil Brides across Europe including shows in Prague, The Netherlands and Poland. Yashin featured at Pukkelpop, Belgium's Premier music festival and Yashin also played at many more UK independent festivals in the summer of 2012: GuilFest, Merthyr Rocks, Butserfest and a memorable set at Hit The Deck.

Yashin released their second studio album, We Created A Monster, on 25 June 2012.

On 24 October, the band announced Lewis had left the band. Connor MacLeod was announced as their new guitarist and, in February 2013, he was endorsed by Ibanez Guitars.

Yashin performed on the main stage at Radstock Festival on 30 March 2013. Yashin also performed at Slam Dunk Festival 2013 in London, Leeds, Wolverhampton and Dublin.

Yashin were asked to return to headline the Saturday in Newcastle and Sunday in Liverpool at Radstock Festival 2014.

The band headlined their own tour in the UK with support act I Divide after announcing their next album, The Renegades.

=== The Renegades (2016) ===
In mid-2016, Yashin released their final album The Renegades.

=== Disbandment ===
In the spring of 2016, Yashin announced that they were breaking up although no reason for this was given. They played two final shows one at the Garage in Glasgow and one at the Garage in London. During these final shows at the end of 2016 original vocalist Michael Rice joined the band on stage to perform some final songs. Members of the bands have moved on to other things with Harry starting his own band Call Me Amour, whereas Connor moved on to join Scottish band Divides.

== Band members ==
Final line-up

- Paul Travers – guitar (2006–2016)
- Andrew McShane – bass, backing vocals (2006–2016)
- David Beaton – drums, percussion (2006–2016)
- Harry Radford – clean vocals (2009–2016)
- Kevin Miles – unclean vocals (2009–2016)
- Connor MacLeod – guitar (2012–2016)

Former members

- Michael Rice – lead vocals (2006–2008, guest appearance in 2016)
- Lewis Millen – guitar (2006–2012)

Timeline

== Discography ==
=== Studio albums ===
- 2010: Put Your Hands Where I Can See Them
- 2012: Put Your Hands Where I Can See Them: Revolution
- 2012: We Created A Monster
- 2016: The Renegades

=== EPs ===
- 2007: Pay to Play
- 2008: Miles Away But Getting Closer
- 2012: Runaway Train EP

=== Singles ===
- 2010: "Get Loose!"
- 2010: "Stand Up"
- 2010: "Friends In High Places"
- 2012: "New Year or New York"
- 2012: "Make It Out Alive"
- 2012: "Runaway Train"
- 2014: "D.E.A.D"
- 2015: "Dorothy Gale" (feat. Itch)
- 2016: "The Renegades"
- 2016: "Vultures"
