= Perfect Weapon (song) =

Single by Black Veil Brides

from the album We Stitch These Wounds
- Released: June 8, 2010
- Recorded: 2009–2010
- Genre: Melodic metalcore
- Length: 4:07
- Label: StandBy Records
- Songwriter: Black Veil Brides
- Producer: Don DeBiase

Black Veil Brides singles chronology
"Knives and Pens" (2009)	"Perfect Weapon" (2010)	"Fallen Angels" (2011)

"Perfect Weapon" is the second single by American rock band, Black Veil Brides, from their debut album We Stitch These Wounds, officially released on June 8, 2010. The song was written by Andy Six before the first departure breakdown of the band. This is the last single to include drummer Sandra Alvarenga before her departure from the band.

On September 22, 2011 "Perfect Weapon" was released as a downloadable song on the Rock Band Network.

== Music video ==
The video begins by showing the members of the band fixing their stage makeup and costumes. After all are ready, Andy Six is shown smoking and exhaling. The view changes to show Six stitching a wound on his mouth in the mirror with the other members behind him. The track "The Outcasts (Call to Arms)" is heard, with the image of the skeleton of a virgin, then the song begins. In the penultimate choir, a group of children behind them shouting "Go!" with Six, then all the children make a detour to the band, on having ended one sees Six kneeling down and praying, and between the children there appears David Sasik, the young actor who appeared in the "Knives and Pens" music video.

== Track listing ==
CD single

No.	Title	Length
1.	"Perfect Weapon"	4:07

== Personnel ==
Black Veil Brides

- Andy Six – lead vocals
- Jake Pitts – lead guitar
- Jinxx – rhythm guitar
- Ashley Purdy – bass, backing vocals
- Sandra Alvarenga – drums, percussion

Production

- Produced by Don DeBiase
- Engineered by Johnny Burke
- Directed by Patrick Fogarty
