= Fallen Angels (Black Veil Brides song) =

Single by Black Veil Brides

from the album Set the World on Fire
- Released: 2011
- Recorded: 2011
- Genre: Hard rock; glam metal
- Length: 3:39
- Label: Lava; Universal Republic
- Songwriter: Black Veil Brides
- Producers: Josh Abraham; Lucian Walker

Black Veil Brides singles chronology
"Perfect Weapon" (2010)	"Fallen Angels" (2011)	"The Legacy" (2011)

Audio sample
- Fallen Angels: file; help

Professional ratings
Review scores
Source	Rating
Altsounds	(94%)

"Fallen Angels" is a song by American rock band Black Veil Brides and the first single from their 2011 album Set the World on Fire.

== Background ==
The song is inspired by the biblical story told in Revelation 12, in which Satan and one-third of God's angels rebelled against God, starting a war in Heaven and were therefore cast out of Heaven to the Earth, becoming "fallen angels." The story was introduced to Andy Biersack and the Black Veil Brides by their band artist Richard Villa:

He's very much into biblical stories, and he found the whole story of the fallen angels who were the ultimate outcasts. They weren't sent to hell, but they weren't allowed in heaven. They had nowhere to go. They weren't human, either, so they had this lonely existence. They wound up banding together and creating their own gang of sorts. We really liked that and wound up writing a song very much based on how we could equate that to our lives.

— Andy Biersack

== Music video ==
A music video for the song was released on YouTube on May 23, 2011, directed by Nathan Cox. The video was subsequently released on iTunes. The video depicts the five members of Black Veil Brides falling from outer space and crashing to the earth riding on comets. When they land, they emerge and begin performing the song as a crowd gathers around them in support.

== Track listing ==
CD single

No.	Title	Length
1.	"Fallen Angels"	3:39

== Personnel ==
Black Veil Brides

- Andy Biersack – lead vocals
- Jake Pitts – lead guitar
- Jinxx – rhythm guitar
- Ashley Purdy – bass, backing vocals
- Christian "CC" Coma – drums, percussion

Production

- Nathan Cox – direction

== Charts ==
Chart (2011)	Peak Position
UK Rock & Metal (Official Charts)	8
US Mainstream Rock (Billboard)	36

== Certifications ==
Region	Certification	Certified units/sales
United States (RIAA)	Gold	500,000^{‡}
^{‡} Sales+streaming figures based on certification alone.
