= Set the World on Fire (Black Veil Brides album) =

Studio album by Black Veil Brides
- Released: June 14th, 2011
- Recorded: January–April 2011
- Studios: Pulse Recording Studios in Los Angeles, California
- Genres: Heavy metal; hard rock; glam metal
- Length: 42:28
- Labels: Lava; Universal Republic
- Producers: Josh Abraham; Lucien Walker

Black Veil Brides chronology
We Stitch These Wounds (2010)	Set the World on Fire (2011)	Wretched and Divine: The Story of the Wild Ones (2013)

Singles from Set the World on Fire
- 1. "Fallen Angels" Released: May 10, 2011; 2. "The Legacy" Released: May 31, 2011; 3. "Rebel Love Song" Released: October 19, 2011

Set the World on Fire is the second studio album by American rock band Black Veil Brides, released through Lava Records/Universal Republic Records on June 14, 2011. It is the first Black Veil Brides album with drummer Christian "CC" Coma, who succeeded Sandra Alvarenga on drums after the latter's departure to join the band Modern Day Escape.

The title track, "Set the World on Fire," was intended for use in Scream 4, but it was not included in the film. Instead, an extended preview was released for fans. "Fallen Angels" was the first single released in support of the album, accompanied by a music video directed by Nathan Cox. On May 3, a preview for another song titled "Youth and Whisky", was released online. It was then announced that the single had been pushed back on iTunes to May 10, and would be provided free of charge to those who pre-ordered the album simultaneously. The full track listing of the album was released on iTunes, with an exclusive bonus track, titled "Smoke and Mirrors".

On May 10, official pre-order packages became available on the official BVB Army website. On May 23, it was announced that the song "Set the World on Fire" would be featured in Transformers: Dark of the Moon and would be the official theme song for WWE Hell in a Cell (2011). During a live stream from Black Veil Brides Stickam channel on May 30, they announced that the music video for their next single, "The Legacy" would premiere on YouTube on June 6, 2011. The next music video to be released from the album was "Rebel Love Song". Two months after being announced, the music video was released via YouTube on October 19, 2011.

== Musical style ==
The album shows Black Veil Brides abandoning the metalcore genre and moving to genres such as hard rock, heavy metal and glam metal. The album also contains elements of speed metal. The song "Saviour" has a small amount of screaming vocals.

== Track listing ==
No.	Title	Writer(s)	Length
1.	"New Religion"	Josh Abraham, Andy Biersack, Jacob Pitts, Ashley Purdy, Luke Walker	3:50
2.	"Set the World on Fire"	Abraham, Biersack, Pitts, Purdy, Walker	3:39
3.	"Fallen Angels"	Abraham, Biersack, Purdy, Walker, Jeremy Ferguson	3:45
4.	"Love Isn't Always Fair"	Abraham, Biersack, Pitts, Purdy, Walker	4:13
5.	"God Bless You"	Biersack, Pitts, Purdy, Marti Frederiksen	3:18
6.	"Rebel Love Song"	Biersack, Pitts, Purdy, Walker, Ferguson	3:57
7.	"Saviour"	Biersack, Walker, Ferguson	4:23
8.	"The Legacy"	Biersack, Pitts, Purdy, Walker	4:40
9.	"Die for You"	Biersack, Pitts, Purdy, Frederiksen	3:43
10.	"Ritual"	Biersack, Pitts, Purdy, Walker, Anne Preven	3:30
11.	"Youth & Whisky"	Biersack, Pitts, Purdy, Walker	3:30
Total length:			42:28

US iTunes and Japan bonus track
No.	Title	Writer(s)	Length
12.	"Smoke and Mirrors"	Biersack, Purdy, Pitts, Abraham, Paparazzi	3:45

Pre-order only
No.	Title	Length
13.	"Introducing Black Veil Brides" (video)	2:54

== Recording ==
The album was recorded at the Pulse Recording Studio in Los Angeles over a period of several months, and was roughly finished in the Spring of 2011 under the supervision of Josh Abraham (Linkin Park, Velvet Revolver, Thirty Seconds to Mars, Korn, etc.). The Demo CDs were labeled Black Veil Brides Greatest Hits by Biersack, as he believed that they had grown both lyrically and musically. After recording had wrapped up, it was revealed their main influence was Def Leppard's Hysteria, in the way the album was recorded and produced.

== Reception ==
=== Commercial performance ===
The album debuted at number 17 on the Billboard 200 albums chart. The album reached #73 on the Canadian Albums Chart. It also achieved moderate success in the United Kingdom by reaching number 3 in the UK Rock Chart.

=== Critical reception ===
Professional ratings
Aggregate scores
Source	Rating
Metacritic	67/100
Review scores
Source	Rating
AbsolutePunk	(25%)
Allmusic	2.5/5 stars
The Rock Pit	5/5 stars
Rock Sound	7/10

Critical reaction to the album was mixed to positive, with the album mostly being considered an improvement over their previous album. On Metacritic, the album received a score of 67 out of 100, indicating "generally favorable reviews". Several reviewers were positive with Todd Jolicouer of The Rock Pit saying, "The vocals are perfectly balanced with the guitar solos", and "This disc is light years ahead of their debut". Jen Thomas of Rock Sound had a mixed opinion of the album. He expresses this when he says "The sound no longer matches the carefully created image but the music's decent none the less".

Year	Nominated work	Award	Result
2011	Set the World on Fire	Revolver Magazine's 20 Best Albums of 2011	5th
2011	"The Legacy"	Revolver Magazine's Song of the Year 2011	2nd
2011	"Rebel Love Song"	Alternate Press's Music Video of the year	1st
2011	"Fallen Angels"	Alternate Press's Music Video of the year	3rd

== Charts ==
Chart (2011)	Peak position
Scottish Albums (Official Charts)	50
UK Albums (Official Charts)	54
UK Rock & Metal Albums (Official Charts)	4
US Billboard 200	17
US Top Rock Albums (Billboard)	3
US Top Hard Rock Albums (Billboard)	2

== Certifications ==
Region	Certification	Certified units/sales
United Kingdom (BPI)	Silver	60,000^{*}
^{*} Sales figures based on certification alone.

== Personnel ==
Black Veil Brides

- Andrew Biersack – lead vocals, keyboards
- Jacob Pitts – lead guitar
- Jeremy Ferguson – rhythm guitar, violin, backing vocals
- Ashley Purdy – bass, backing vocals
- Christian Mora – drums, percussion

Production

- Josh Abraham – production
- Lucien Walker – production
- Captain Price – engineering, mixing
- Eddie Shreyer – mastering
- Black Veil Brides – songwriting
