= Black Veil Brides =

American rock band

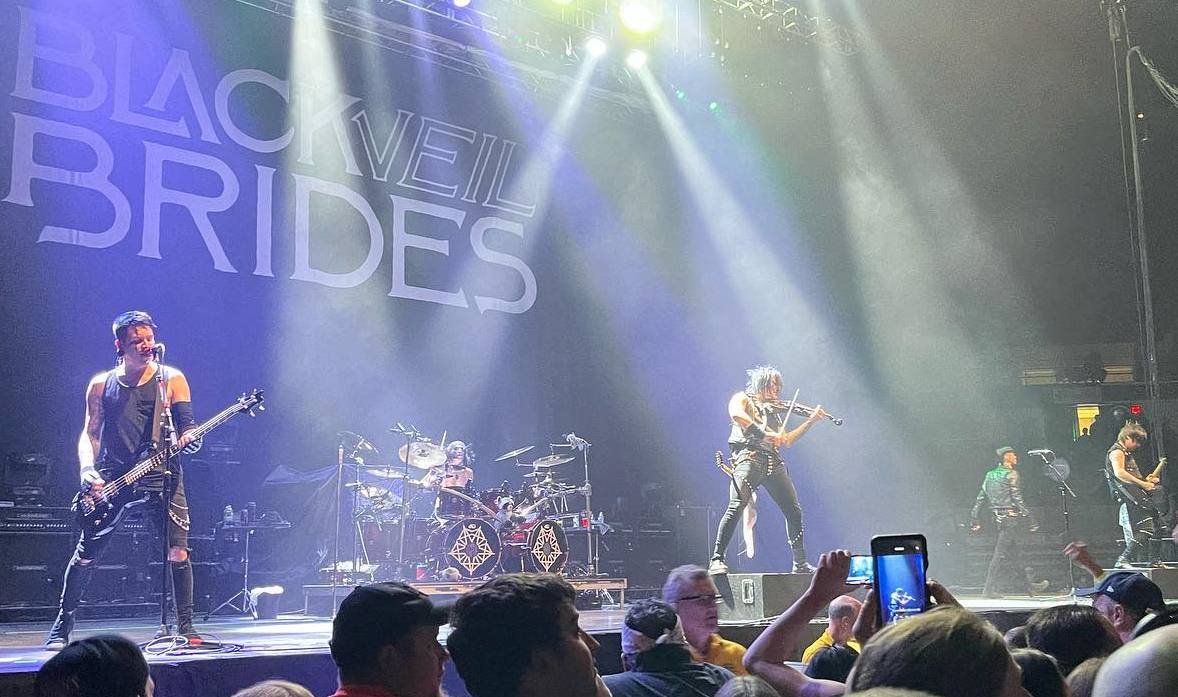
- Black Veil Brides performing in 2022

Background information
- Also known as: BVB
- Origin: Cincinnati, Ohio, U.S.
- Genres: Hard rock; alternative metal; glam metal; gothic metal; metalcore
- Years active: 2006–present
- Labels: Spinefarm; Sumerian; Lava; Universal Republic; StandBy
- Members: Andy Biersack; Jinxx; Jake Pitts; Christian "CC" Coma; Lonny Eagleton
- Past members: Johnny Herold; Phil Cenedella; Chris Riesenberg; Kevin Harris; Nate Shipp; Robert Thomas; Mike Stamper; Chris Hollywood; Pan The Gypsy; Sandra Alvarenga; Ashley Purdy
- Website: blackveilbrides.net

Black Veil Brides is an American rock band based in Hollywood, California. The group formed in 2006 in Cincinnati, Ohio, and is currently composed of lead vocalist Andy Biersack, multi instrumentalist Jinxx, lead guitarist Jake Pitts, drummer Christian "CC" Coma and bassist Lonny Eagleton. Black Veil Brides are known for their use of black makeup, body paint, tight black studded clothing, and long hair, which were all inspired by the stage personas of Kiss and Mötley Crüe, as well as other 1980s glam metal acts.

== History ==
=== Formation and early years (2006–2009) ===
Black Veil Brides were originally formed in Cincinnati, Ohio in 2006 by Andy Biersack (who went by the stage name Andy Six until 2011), Johnny Herold, and Phil Cennedella. Eventually, Andy relocated to Los Angeles, California. They recorded a demo EP, Sex & Hollywood, in 2007, followed by a second demo, Never Give In, in 2008. Never Give In contained early versions of several songs that would be re-recorded for their debut album. In early 2009, he formed a new band using the current Black Veil Brides name, with the lineup consisting of Biersack, guitarist Chris Hollywood, and drummer Sandra Alvarenga, who were soon joined by bassist Ashley Purdy and guitarist Pan the Gypsy; they signed with the independent label StandBy Records. Chris Hollywood and Pan the Gypsy later departed the band and were replaced by Jinxx and Jake Pitts.

Purdy also explained the meaning of the band name "Black Veil Brides":

Black Veil Brides is a Roman Catholic term used for when a woman marries into the church and gives up all the pleasures of life to devote her life to God. She is then deemed a Black Veil Bride. Sorta similar to a rock band where you have to give up many things in pursuit of what you're passionate about or believe in. It also has the dichotomy of the positive and negative. The happiest time in one's life, could be getting married. And the opposite of that in one's life would be at a funeral of a loved one. It all tends to fit really well for a dark and heavy rock band.

The writing process for a tour and a record began immediately. They released their debut single, Knives And Pens, on June 17, 2009, along with a music video for it that quickly went viral. In December 2009, the band embarked on their first US tour, titled "On Leather Wings".

=== We Stitch These Wounds (2009–2010) ===
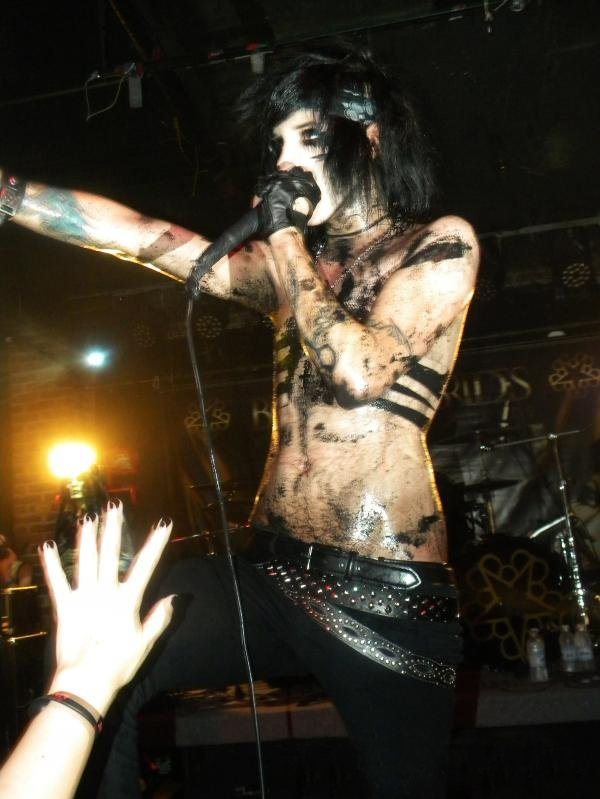
Andy Biersack performing in Cleveland with Black Veil Brides in 2010

The group's debut album We Stitch These Wounds was released July 20, 2010, and sold over 10,000 copies in its first week, ranking at No. 36 on the Billboard Top 200 chart, and No. 1 on the Billboard Independent chart. Shortly after the album's release, Sandra Alvarenga was replaced by Christian "CC" Coma. In late 2010, Black Veil Brides went on tour with bands The Birthday Massacre, Dommin and Aural Vampire.

Black Veil Brides first came to the attention of Lava Records president Jason Flom when the chief music officer at Hot Topic, John Kirkpatrick, told him about the incredible buzz that was building around the band, with their T-shirt attracting the second biggest sales in the country at that point. What was even more impressive was that they had built their fanatical following in a "DIY" fashion, such as in making their own self-funded videos. When Flom then heard their music and met the group, he decided that they were exactly what he'd been looking for, later commenting to HitQuarters:

They are bringing back what has been missing for over a decade: they are rock heroes that are truly larger than life. The make-up, the hair, the leather, and most importantly they have great songs, great playing …

Flom then made a deal with Neil Sheehan, founder of StandBy Records, to sign the band over to Lava.

Black Veil Brides supported the Murderdolls in the "God Save The Scream Tour" 2011 and also toured America on the AP Tour from March 18 to May 6. The band continued on to the Vans Warped Tour, which began June 24, 2011, and ended August 14 of the same year. However, on June 18, Andy fell from a pillar while performing and broke his ribs, which caused them to miss the first week of the tour. The band also performed at festivals such as the Download Festival in the UK and Bamboozle. The band also played at the Rock am Ring festival at the Nürburgring motorsport complex in Nürburg, Germany in June 2011. On April 20, it was revealed the band had won Revolver Magazine's Golden Gods Award for Best New Artist, the title for Kerrang!'s Best Newcomers, and were nominated for the title of Kerrang!'s Best International Newcomer.

=== Set the World on Fire and Rebels (2011–2012) ===
The band's second studio album, Set the World on Fire was released on June 14, 2011, through Lava Music/Universal Republic Records. The cover art was released in April. The title track from Set the World on Fire was planned for use in the movie Scream 4. Upon learning that the song was not going to be used in the film, the band released a statement and an extended song preview. It was later announced on May 23 that the song was to be featured in the movie Transformers: Dark of the Moon.

A clip of the album's lead single, "Fallen Angels", was released in late April. It was then fully released in the UK on May 1. The US release was pushed from May 3 to May 10 to be given for free with the pre-order of Set the World on Fire on iTunes. Because "Fallen Angels" was delayed, the band released a preview of the song "Youth and Whisky" on May 3. The album's next single was The Legacy, with a music video filmed by Patrick Fogarty that premiered on YouTube on June 6, 2011. Their third single from Set the World on Fire was "Rebel Love Song", which also had a music video directed by Patrick Fogarty. The video was released on YouTube on October 19. On October 25, the band announced that they had to cancel tour dates for "certain reasons". It was later announced that it was because Andy had broken his nose on the drum set rising platform during a performance. Despite the injury, which was bad enough for people to notice that he was having difficulty breathing and talking, he was determined to finish the show. After a visit from the doctor, he was told to sit back for a few weeks to rest and heal. They announced that they would return to tour for the beginning of the Buried Alive Tour with Avenged Sevenfold, Asking Alexandria, and Hollywood Undead.

It was announced via Andy's Twitter that they would be releasing an EP titled "Rebels". They released a trailer on YouTube which shows Andy recording vocals for their cover of the song "Rebel Yell" by Billy Idol, which was to appear on the EP. Another trailer for the EP was released, in which Andy gives a few more details about it. The third and final trailer about the EP was released on November 14, in which Andy goes into detail about the track "Coffin" which was a left over song from the previous album Set the World on Fire that was to be released on the EP. In an interview with Chris Droney from Glasswerk National, they hinted that there would be a guest guitarist to appear on the EP, who eventually turned out to be Zakk Wylde (Ozzy Osbourne, Black Label Society), who plays the guitar solo on the cover of the song Unholy, originally performed by Kiss. Rebels was eventually released on December 13, 2011.

=== Wretched and Divine: The Story of the Wild Ones (2012–2013) ===
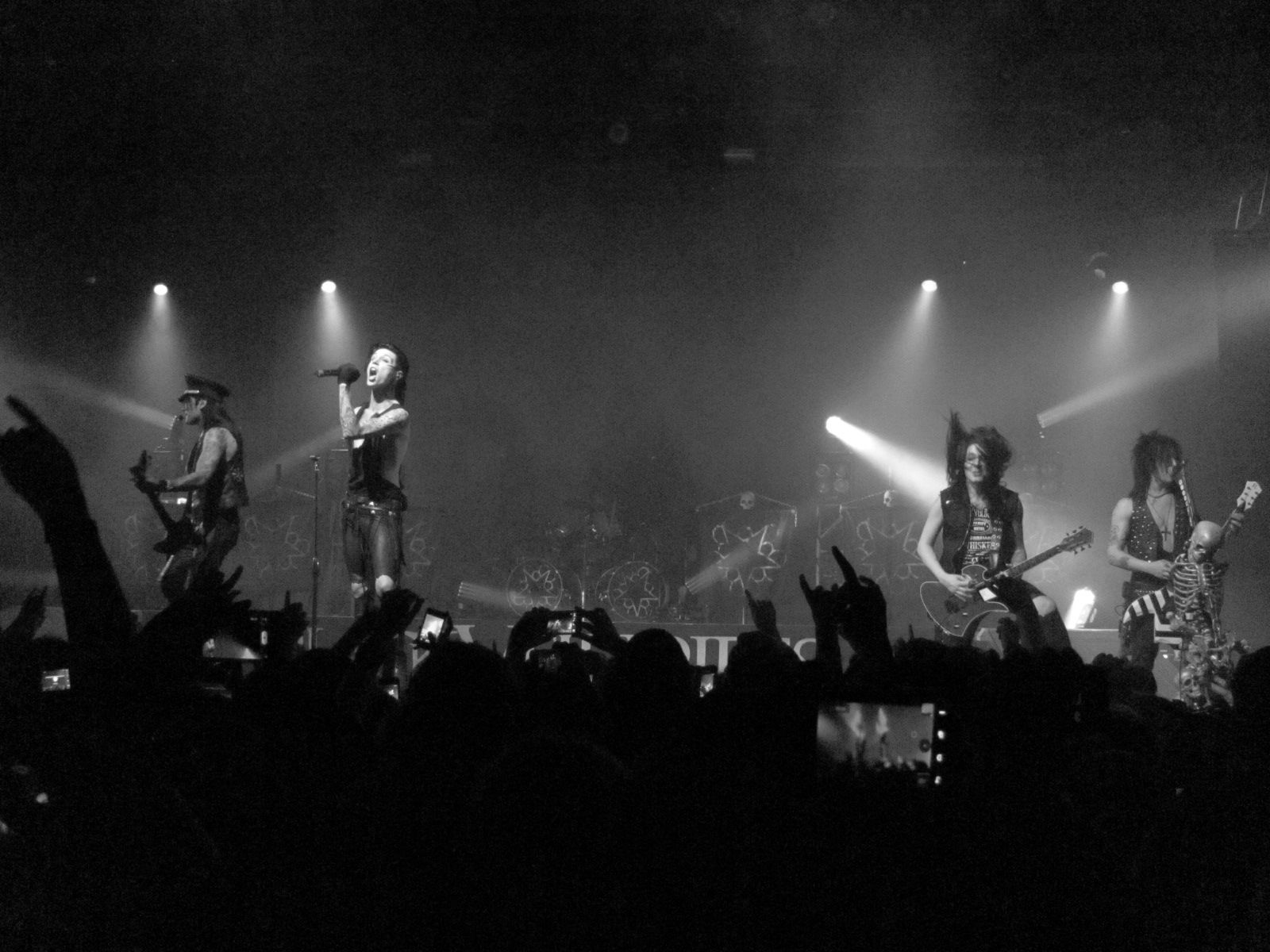
Black Veil Brides live in 2013

A Black Veil Brides song, titled "Unbroken", appeared on the soundtrack to the movie The Avengers on May 1, 2012, and is the only track released by Black Veil Brides solely on a compilation album. On June 13, the official music video for the song "Coffin" from the Rebels EP, was released.

Regarding the band's third album, guitarists Jinxx and Jake told Chris Droney in an interview for Glasswerk National that the band is constantly writing new music, and that they were planning on recording their next major full-length album in April 2012. On February 18, Jake tweeted, "Amazing stuff. This next record is going to kick your arses." In a February 2012 interview, Ashley Purdy announced that the band's third studio album was scheduled to be released at the end of 2012. On May 2, Black Veil Brides had this to announce: "As of today, we have officially began recording our new album which will be released on October 30th!" Andy said in an interview at the Download Festival that "We've got three songs tracked. We've set ourselves a deadline of the end of August to finish it. We've got 20 to 25 songs written and we're narrowing it down now. John Feldmann is producing it. It's going to be more of a punk rock record than anything we've done before. It's Social Distortion meets Metallica." September 4, Andy announced that they had finished recording of the new album: "Well, tracking has officially wrapped for the new record! Still some stuff to finish up, but I’m so happy, excited, and proud of this album!"

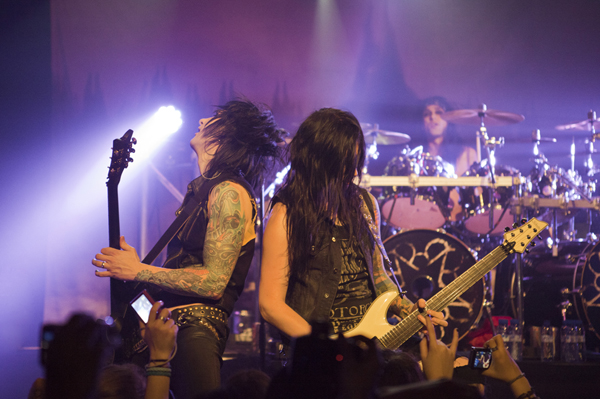
Jinxx (left) and Jake Pitts (right) performing at the Barcelona Music Hall in 2013

It was announced that the release of their third album was to be pushed back from October 30, 2012, to January 2013. On October 8, the album cover art and album title were released – Wretched and Divine: The Story of the Wild Ones was the title, and pre-orders were launched from iTunes on Halloween, October 31. The cover art for Wretched and Divine was painted by Richard Villa, long-time Black Veil Brides cover artist who also painted the cover art for We Stitch These Wounds, Set the World on Fire, and Rebels.

The lead single from Wretched and Divine, "In the End", was featured as one of the theme songs for WWE's Hell in a Cell. The band will embark on "The Church of the Wild Ones" North American Tour in support of the album, with further details to be announced. On October 29, the band announced the official track list and the new, rescheduled release date for the album (January 8, 2013). On October 31, a trailer was released, revealing that Black Veil Brides planned to release a full-length film titled Legion of the Black in 2013 in select theaters. Wretched and Divine is a concept album, and the film is a visual depiction of the story within the album. The movie was screened at The Silent Movie Theater in Los Angeles, California on December 21–23, 2012. Andy Biersack appeared at the showing to surprise fans, to their delight. Wretched and Divine: The Story of the Wild Ones peaked at number 7 on the Billboard Top 200.

Black Veil Brides played on the Warped Tour from June–August 2013. On June 11, 2013, Black Veil Brides released the Wretched and Divine Ultimate Edition containing three exclusive tracks: "Revelation", "Victory Call" and "Let You Down" along with the Legion of the Black DVD included.

The band won in 20 categories in the 2013 Alternative Press Readers Poll.

=== Self-titled fourth album and Vale (2013–2019) ===
In an interview with Artisan News, the band's singer Andy Biersack said that the band decided to start working on their fourth album, and that the band's intention was to "do something we've never really done before". He explained that after making the conceptual Wretched and Divine, album they became "the band that I think we should be. I think we're at the right place." Andy also said in an interview with Pit Cam TV that they would likely finish the album in the studio during around the summer of 2014. Black Veil Brides won a Golden God Award for their song "In the End", winning "song of the year" and mass radio hits.

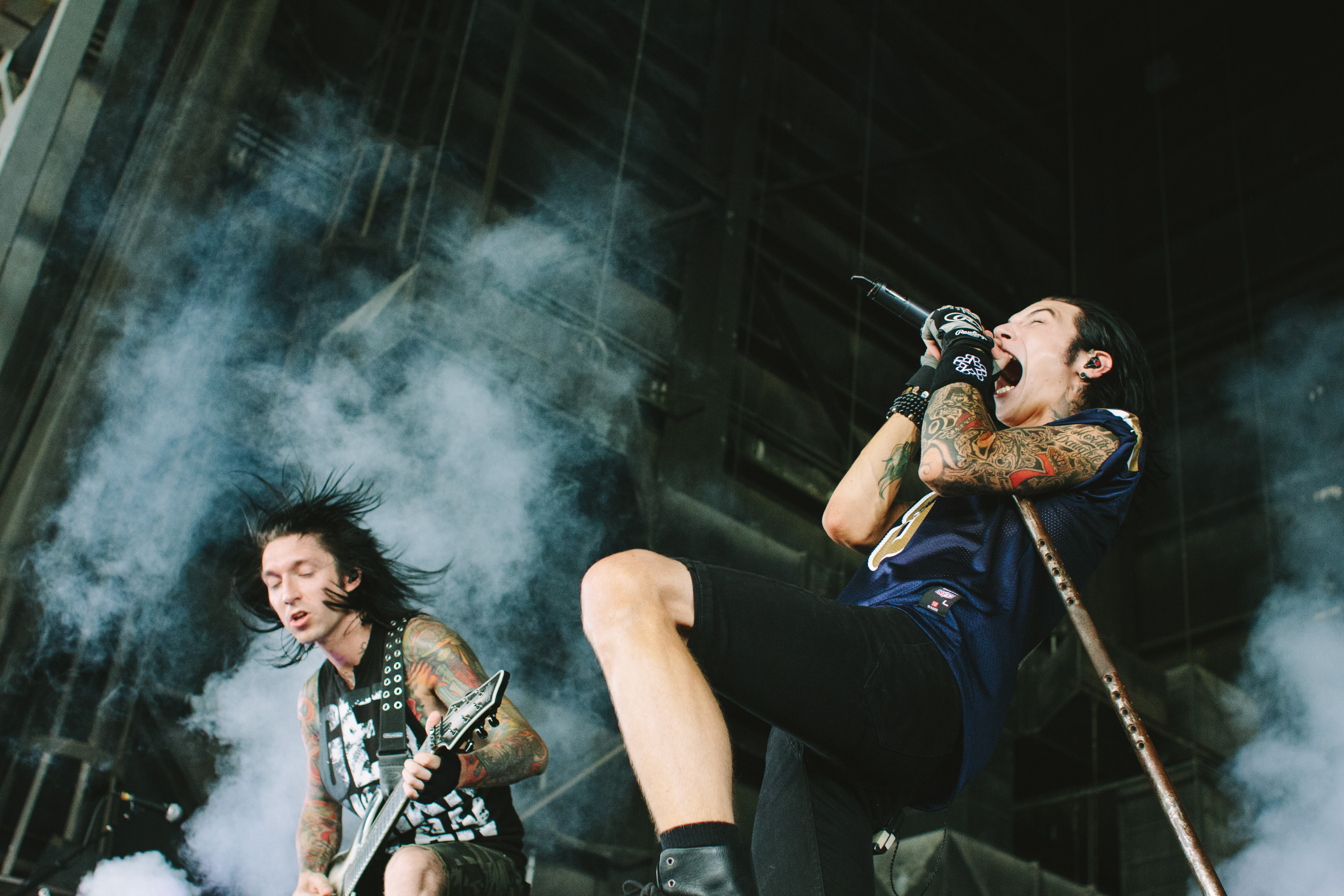
Black Veil Brides performing on the 2014 Warped Tour

The band's self-titled fourth album was released on October 28, 2014. In July 2014, Black Veil Brides announced the availability of pre-orders for the album on PledgeMusic. The band were headliners in America with support acts consisting of Falling in Reverse, Set It Off, and Drama Club throughout October and November and dubbed the tour, "The Black Mass". The first song released off the record, "Heart of Fire" debuted on BBC Radio 1's Rock Show with Daniel P Carter on September 7, 2014, and later in the week another new song was released onto YouTube titled, "Faithless." On October 6, 2014, they released the music video of their song "Heart of Fire". Soon after this, on October 31, 2014, the music video for the song "Goodbye Agony" was released onto YouTube. October 18, 2014, onwards till October 27, 2014, short clips of their songs off the new album were released daily on YouTube on the channel "BlackVeilBridestv".

On July 10, 2015, Black Veil Brides released their first live DVD/Blu-ray entitled Alive and Burning which was shot at The Wiltern in Los Angeles, and charted #1 on the US and UK Billboard charts.

In November 2015, Andy Biersack spoke with Alternative Press noting that the band were in the early stages of writing, but also noted that "once we wrap recording on the Andy Black record, then we start to shift focus to [Black Veil Brides]".

On December 21, 2016, Black Veil Brides released the first single from their new album titled "The Outsider". The new album titled Vale was released on January 12, 2018.

On November 15, 2019, Black Veil Brides announced that they had "mutually agreed to part ways" with bass player Ashley Purdy. Andy's guitarist Lonny Eagleton was introduced as a new bassist.

=== The Phantom Tomorrow, and EPs (2020–2023) ===
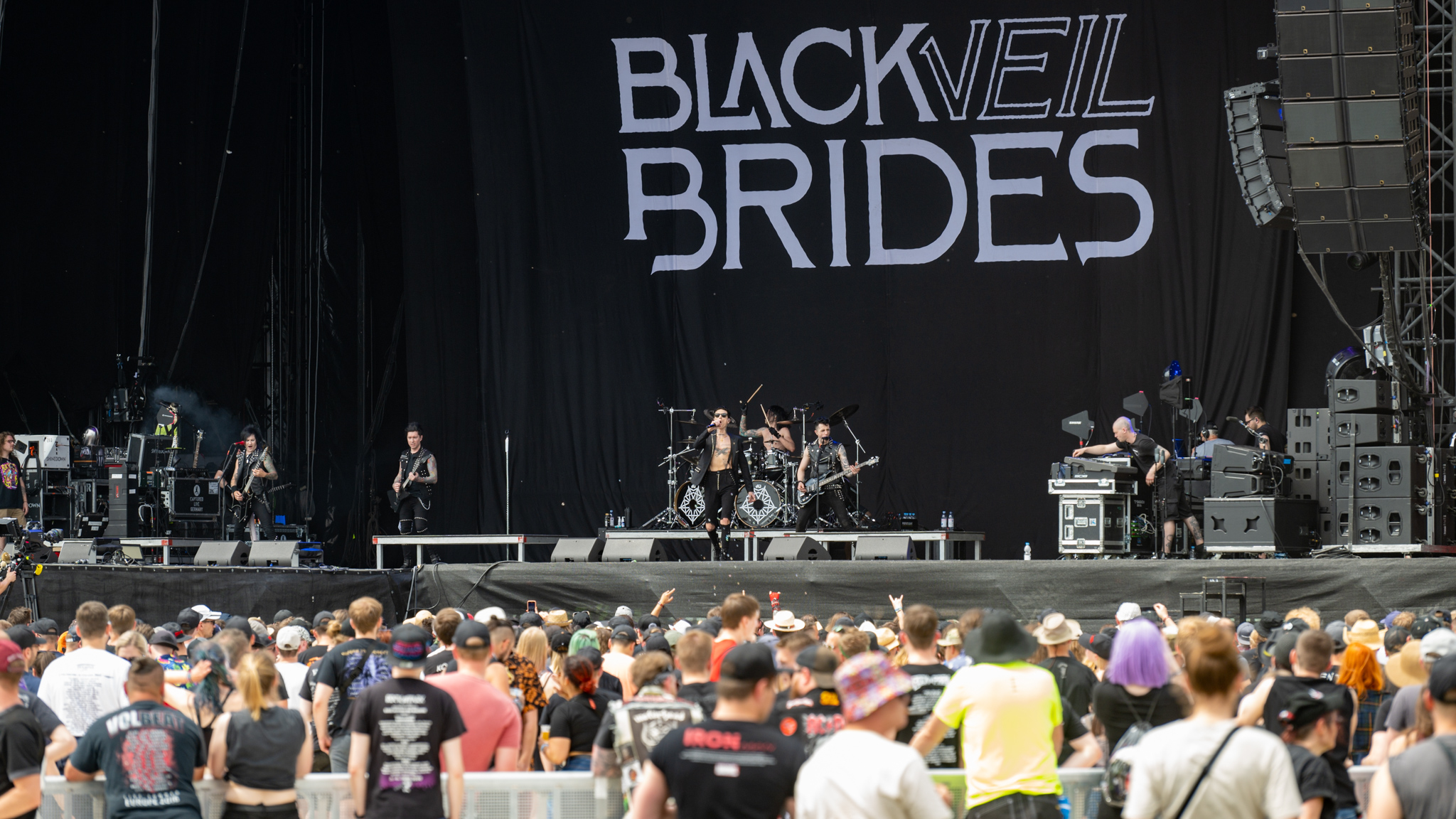
Black Veils Brides performing in 2022

On August 2, 2020, following the live stream show which celebrated the re-recording of We Stitch These Wounds, Jeremy "Jinxx" Ferguson had confirmed that they are working on a new album during the COVID-19 pandemic, stating in an interview with Myglobalmind:

We have been writing up a storm. I can't talk too about what we envision for the next album, but we are revisiting the idea of another concept record like we did with Wretched and Divine. It would be fun to do another concept CD, but we'll see how things pan out. We have six solid songs written, and we are still writing. Once we do this show, we will head back into the studio to write some more. We have been doing it all ourselves. Jake will be producing it, and we are tracking vocals and guitars at his studio. I'm recording the strings at my studio. With COVID going on, we have all been quarantined and working at home, but when we do get together, it's just us and maybe our wives. When we are all in the same room bouncing ideas off each other, it's a never-ending flood of inspiration and ideas. I'm excited for fans to hear what we are coming up with.

On November 11, 2020, the band announced The Phantom Tomorrow in an interview with Kerrang!. The first single "Scarlet Cross" was released on November 13. On April 12, 2021, the band released the second single from The Phantom Tomorrow, "Fields of Bone", as well as releasing the cover art, track listing, and pre-order details. On May 4, the band announced that they were forced to delay the release of The Phantom Tomorrow due to production complications caused by the COVID-19 pandemic, pushing the album's release back from June 4, 2021, to October 29, 2021. It was soon followed up with "Crimson Skies", released with an animated lyric video on June 3. The fourth single, "Torch", was released with a music video on August 13.

On May 13, 2022, the band released the music video to the song "Born Again". On August 30, the band announced on their social media that they are releasing a new single. On September 6, the band released the single "Saviour II" and its corresponding music video. At the same time, they announced their new EP called The Mourning which was released on October 21, 2022, through Sumerian Records.

=== Bleeders EP, and Vindicate (2024–present) ===
On April 26, 2024, the band announced that they have signed to Spinefarm Records and released their Bleeders EP. A music video for the song "Bleeders" was released on April 26, 2024. A music video for the song "My Friends" was released in July 2024. The EP is inspired by Sweeney Todd.

The band are confirmed to be making an appearance at Welcome to Rockville, which will take place in Daytona Beach, Florida in May 2026. In February 2026, the band was also announced as part of the lineup for the Louder Than Life music festival in Louisville, scheduled to take place in September.

On March 19, 2026, the band announced their seventh studio album, Vindicate, which was released on May 8, 2026. In an interview with Valentino Petrarca of The Aquarian, Biersack confirmed the band's choice to get heavier on Vindicate was directly tied to self-producing the album.

== Musical style and influences ==
Black Veil Brides' music has been categorized under multiple genres of rock music including hard rock alternative metal, metalcore, glam metal, gothic metal, heavy metal, gothic rock, emo, post-hardcore, and shock rock.

Alternative Press contested the band's classification as an emo band: "While BVB sound more emo than they look [...] This group are aiming for something on the epic side: concept records that build out worlds, not introspective records that make them smaller and more intimate." Kerrang! referred to them as a "Myspace band" due to their use of the platform to gain a following early in their career. Additionally, Loudwire called them "fashioncore", while admitting that the term "actually isn’t really a subgenre of hardcore at all" and that it "was coined as an insult to hardcore kids who started caring more about how they dyed their hair than the actual music."

The band's influences include Marilyn Manson, Kiss, Metallica, Pantera, Avenged Sevenfold, Mötley Crüe, Poison, AFI, W.A.S.P., Rob Zombie, L.A. Guns, Aerosmith, Misfits, Dead Boys, The Damned, Slipknot, Dropkick Murphys, David Bowie, Queen, Twisted Sister, Def Leppard, Skid Row, Social Distortion, Rise Against, Billy Idol, Alice Cooper and Hot Water Music. In an interview Christian Coma cited his greatest musical influences as Pendulum, Deadmau5, As I Lay Dying, In Flames, and Rise Against while also adding that former Slipknot drummer Joey Jordison influenced his style of playing.

=== Evolution of style ===
Black Veil Brides' style has constantly been changing ever since the group was formed in 2006. The addition of guitarist Jake Pitts led to guitar solos on almost every track. Their first album We Stitch These Wounds was where the band was described as primarily metalcore. With the release of Set the World on Fire, their appearance changed to resemble that of glam metal/shock rock bands like Kiss and Mötley Crüe, while their sound dropped the smooth singing and harsh screams in exchange for clean, but gruff "James Hetfield" style vocals. They followed this musical style all the way up to Wretched and Divine: The Story of the Wild Ones. The classical influence of Jinxx (rhythm guitar, violin, and cello) is much more pronounced on Wretched and Divine, with many symphonic additions and the band's first instrumental track, titled "Overture," featuring violins played by Jinxx. The band self-identify as simply rock 'n' roll.

=== Lyrics ===
Black Veil Brides' lyrics have dealt with topics aimed at people who feel like outcasts in society. Their former bass player, Ashley Purdy, said this in an interview about the message the band sends to its listeners: "We carry a message of believing in yourself and letting no one tell you otherwise. We stand up for the underdog and the disenfranchised. Anything strange, odd, or unique... we embrace that. So basically standing up for yourself; have fun and live your life how you choose. You only have one life, make the most of it."

== Band members ==
Current

- Andy Biersack – lead vocals (2006–present)
- Jinxx – rhythm guitar, violin, cello, keyboards, piano, backing vocals (2009–present)
- Jake Pitts – lead guitar (2010–present)
- Christian "CC" Coma – drums (2010–present)
- Lonny Eagleton – bass, backing vocals (2019–present)

Former

- Johnny Herold – lead guitar (2006)
- Phil Cenedella – bass, backing vocals (2006)
- Chris Riesenberg – drums (2006)
- Kevin Harris – keyboards (2006–2007)
- Nate Shipp – guitars, backing vocals (2006–2007)
- Robert Thomas – bass (2007–2008)
- Mike Stamper – drums (2006–2009)
- Chris Hollywood – guitars, backing vocals (2007–2009)
- Pan The Gypsy – guitars (2009–2010)
- Sandra Alvarenga – drums (2009–2010)
- Ashley Purdy – bass, backing vocals (2009–2019)

Timeline

== Discography ==
Studio albums

- We Stitch These Wounds (2010)
- Set the World on Fire (2011)
- Wretched and Divine: The Story of the Wild Ones (2013)
- Black Veil Brides (2014)
- Vale (2018)
- Re-Stitch These Wounds (2020)
- The Phantom Tomorrow (2021)
- Vindicate (2026)

== Tours ==
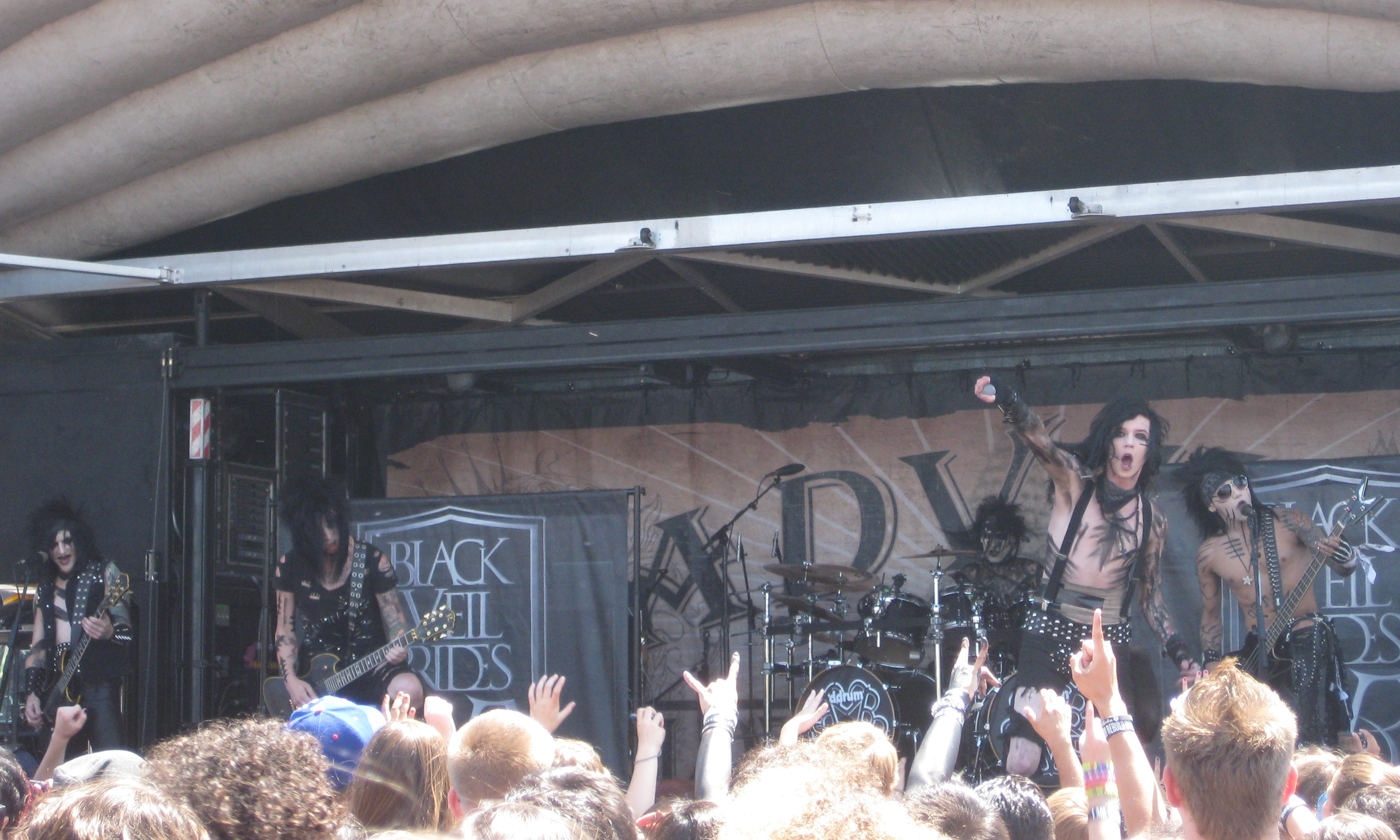
Black Veil Brides performing on the 2011 Warped Tour. Left to right: Jinxx, Jake Pitts, Christian Coma, Andy Biersack, and Ashley Purdy

=== 2009–2010 ===
- On Leather Wings Tour (December 2009)
- Royal Family Clothing Tour (with From First to Last, Eyes Set to Kill, Confide, and Sleeping with Sirens – March–April 2010)
- Sacred Ceremony Tour (with Vampires Everywhere!, Modern Day Escape, and Get Scared – July–August 2010)
- Entertainment or Death Tour (with William Control and Motionless in White – October–November 2010)
- Pins and Needles Tour (with The Birthday Massacre; supported by Dommin, and Aural Vampire – November 2010)

=== 2011 ===
- God Save the Scream Tour (supported Murderdolls with The Defiled in the UK – February 2011)
- AP Tour (with D.R.U.G.S., I See Stars, VersaEmerge, and Conditions – March–May 2011)
- Download Festival
- Warped Tour (June–August 2011) Black Veil Brides missed the first week of the tour on account of Andy's broken ribs.
- UK Tour (with Yashin and My Passion – October–November 2011) Black Veil Brides missed a couple dates due to Biersack's broken nose.
- Buried Alive Tour (supported Avenged Sevenfold with Hollywood Undead and Asking Alexandria – November–December 2011)

=== 2012–2013 ===
- UK and Ireland Tour (supported by D.R.U.G.S. – March–April 2012)
- Download Festival
- European Summer Tour (supporting Slash and Mötley Crüe – June 2012) Black Veil Brides cancelled the last week of the European Summer Tour dates due to the death of Biersack's grandfather.
- The Church of the Wild Ones Tour: first leg (supported by William Control – January 2013)
- Kerrang! Tour (with Chiodos, Tonight Alive, and Fearless Vampire Killers – February 2013)
- The Church of the Wild Ones Tour: second leg (supported by William Control – February–March 2013)
- The Church of the Wild Ones Tour: third/European leg (supported by Heaven's Basement – April 2013)
- Warped Tour (June–August 2013)
- HardDrive Live presents: Monster Energy Outbreak Tour (supporting Bullet for My Valentine with Stars in Stereo and Throw the Fight – September–November 2013)

=== 2014–2015 ===
- Black Mass Tour (October–December 2014), supported by Falling in Reverse, Set It Off and Drama Club
- Black Mass Canada and US Tour (February–March 2015), supported by Memphis May Fire, Ghost Town
- Black Mass Europe Tour (march-April 2015) supported by Fearless Vampire Killers, Like A Storm
- Download Festival
- Vans Warped Tour (June–August 2015)
- Vans Warped Tour UK (October 18, 2015)

=== 2018 ===
- The Resurrection Tour (January - March 2018), supported by Asking Alexandria and Crown the Empire
- The Resurrection Tour USA (April - May 2018), supported by Asking Alexandria and Blessthefall
  - Welcome To Rockville (April 28, 2018)
  - Carolina Rebellion (May 5, 2018)
  - Northern Invasion (May 13, 2018)
  - Rock on the Range (May 19, 2018)
- Download Festival UK (June 10, 2018)
- Vans Warped Tour (June - July 2018)
- Aftershock Festival (October 14, 2018)

=== 2024–present ===
- Popular MonsTOUR II: World Domination (US dates only August-September 2024, supporting Falling in Reverse)
- North America 2025 (June–July 2025, supporting Babymetal)

== Awards ==
Year	Nominated work	Award	Result	Place
2007	Black Veil Brides	Bogart's Battle of the Bands	Won	2nd
2011	Black Veil Brides	MTV's Favorite Breakthrough Band of 2011	Won	3rd
2011	Andy Biersack	Revolver's 100 Greatest Living Rock Stars 2011	Won	—
2011	Set the World on Fire	Revolver's 20 Best Albums of 2011	Won	5th
2011	Black Veil Brides	Revolver's Golden God Awards: Best New Band 2011	Won	—
2011	"The Legacy"	Revolver's Song of the Year 2011	Won	2nd
2011	Black Veil Brides for "Fallen Angels"	WGRD’s 2011 Favorite Listener Band of The Year	Won	2nd
2011	Black Veil Brides	Alternative Press: Band of the Year Award	Won	1st
2011	Christian Coma	Alternative Press: Drummer of the Year Award	Won	1st
2012	Black Veil Brides	Revolver's Golden God Awards: Most Dedicated Fans 2012	Nominated	—
2012	Andy Biersack	Revolver's Golden God Awards: Best Vocalist 2012	Nominated	—
2012	Jake Pitts and Jinxx	Revolver's Golden God Awards: Best Guitarists 2012	Won	—
2012	Black Veil Brides for Set the World on Fire	Kerrang! Award for Best Album 2012	Nominated	—
2012	Black Veil Brides	Kerrang! Award for Best Live Band 2012	Nominated	—
2012	Andy Biersack	Kerrang! Award for Hottest Male 2012	Nominated	—
2012	Ashley Purdy	Kerrang! Award for Hottest Male 2012	Nominated	—
2012	Black Veil Brides for "Rebel Love Song"	Kerrang! Award for Best Single 2012	Won	—
2013	Black Veil Brides for "In the End"	Loudwire Cage Match: Black Veil Brides vs. Halestorm	Won	—
2013	Black Veil Brides for "In the End"	Loudwire Cage Match: Black Veil Brides vs. HIM	Won	—
2013	Black Veil Brides for "In the End"	Loudwire Cage Match: Black Veil Brides vs. Coheed and Cambria	Won	—
2013	Black Veil Brides for "In the End"	Loudwire Cage Match: Black Veil Brides vs. Asking Alexandria	Won	—
2013	Black Veil Brides for "In the End"	Loudwire Cage Match: Black Veil Brides vs. Bullet for My Valentine	Won	—
2013	Black Veil Brides for "In the End"	Revolver's Golden Gods Awards: Song of the Year 2013	Won	—
2013	Black Veil Brides	Revolver's Golden Gods Awards: Most Dedicated Fans 2013	Nominated	—
2013	Black Veil Brides	Relentless Kerrang! Awards 2013: Best live band	Won	—
2013	Black Veil Brides	Alternative Press 2013 Readers Poll: Best Live Band	Won	1st
2014	Black Veil Brides	Loudwire Most Dedicated Fans of 2013	Won	—
2015	London Club Shows	Relentless Kerrang! Awards 2015: Best Event	Nominated	—
2015	Black Veil Brides (album)	Relentless Kerrang! Awards 2015: Best Album	Nominated	—
2015	Black Veil Brides	Relentless Kerrang! Awards 2015: Best Live Band	Won	—
2015	Black Veil Brides	Relentless Kerrang! Awards 2015: Best Fanbase	Nominated	—
2015	Andy Biersack	Relentless Kerrang! Awards 2015: Tweeter Of The Year	Nominated	—
2015	Andy Biersack	Kerrang! Award for Hottest Male 2014	Won	—
2015	Jake Pitts	Metal Hammer Golden God Awards: Dimebag Darrell Shredder	Nominated	—
2015	Black Veil Brides (album)	Alternative Press Music Awards 2015: Album Of The Year	Won	—
2015	Black Veil Brides	Alternative Press Music Awards 2015: Artist Of The Year	Nominated	—
2015	Andy Biersack	Rock Sound Music Awards 2015: Hero Of The Year	Won	
—	"—" denotes a nomination that did not place or places were not relevant in the award.			
