= Jake Pitts =

American guitarist

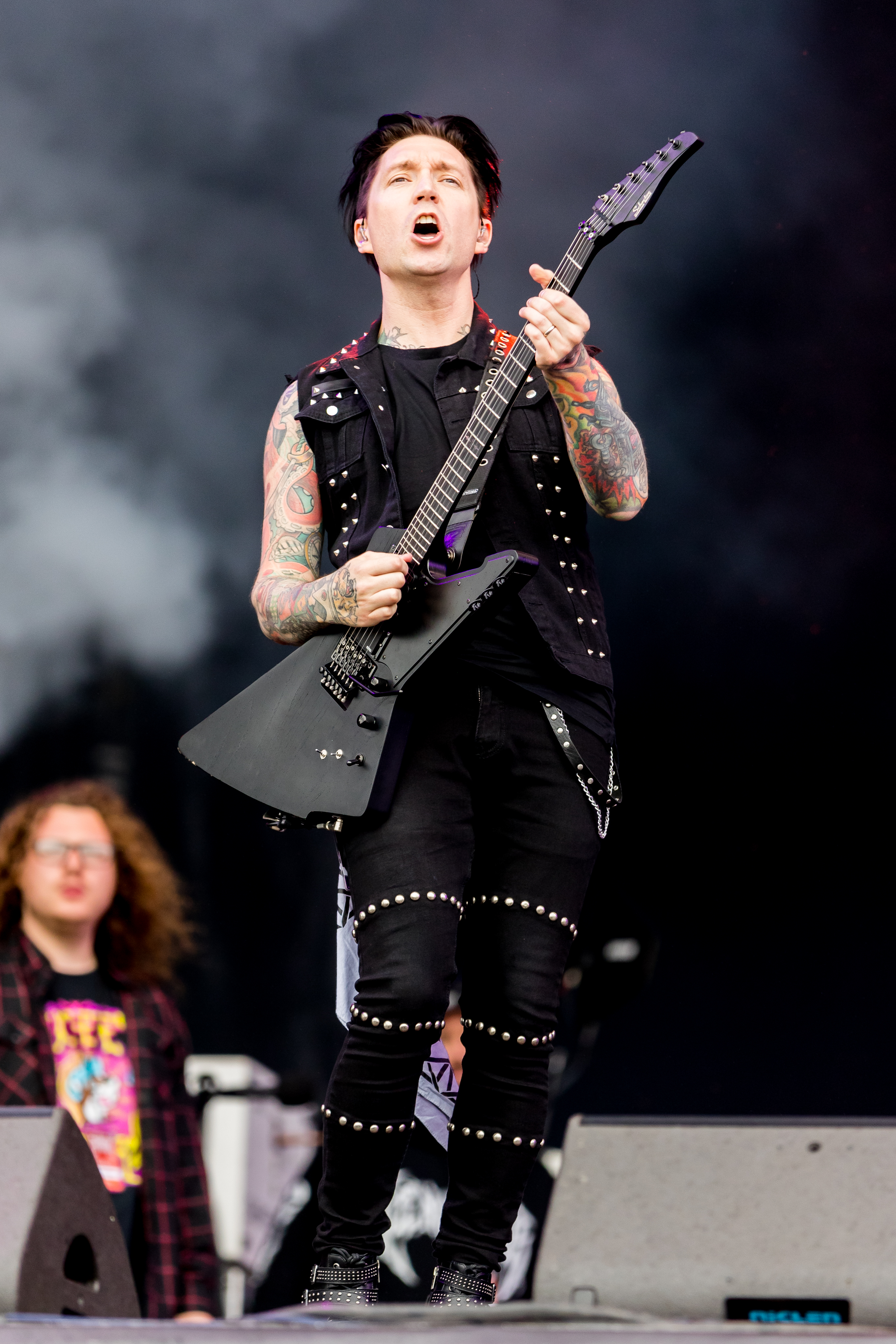
- Pitts in 2022

Background information
- Born: Jacob Mark Pitts; August 21, 1985 (age 40); Nampa, Idaho, U.S.
- Genres: Hard rock, heavy metal, alternative metal, glam metal, metalcore
- Occupations: Musician, songwriter, record producer
- Instrument: Guitar
- Years active: 1999–present
- Member of: Black Veil Brides
- Website: Jake Pitts on Twitter

Jacob Mark "Jake" Pitts (born August 21, 1985) is an American musician best known as the lead guitarist and occasional backing vocalist of the rock band Black Veil Brides. Pitts and fellow Black Veil Brides guitarist Jinxx won Revolver Magazine's Golden Gods Award for "Best Guitarists 2012".

== Early life, career and influences ==
Pitts received his first guitar when he was 10 years old, but he put it away and did not play it again until he was 13. He began listening to Metallica around this time, because he wanted to recreate their sound. Jake only received lessons for about four months. After this time, he chose to learn on his own. From his Mother, Carolyn, he learned music and harmony theory, who was a classical pianist and composer. Pitts is influenced musically by rock and heavy metal artists such as Van Halen, Scorpions, Paul Gilbert, Buckethead, Randy Rhoads, Pantera, Black Sabbath, Armored Saint, Dio, Manowar, Iced Earth, Darkthrone, Cannibal Corpse, Slayer, Avenged Sevenfold, Mötley Crüe, and Metallica.

Before joining Black Veil Brides, Pitts played lead guitar in the bands the Perfect Victim and 80 Proof Riot. He is a certified recording engineer and went to Los Angeles Recording School in 2006. He co-produced the fourth Black Veil Brides record with John Feldmann, along with their fifth record Vale.

He is working on a new band with his spouse Cory, called Aelonia. He is also producing for other bands such as New Years Day.

Pitts occasionally provides backing vocals along with Jinxx on songs such as "Fallen Angels" and "The Legacy".

== Personal life ==
The song "Carolyn" was written by Pitts about his mother when she was going through a period of illness. On January 18, 2014, his mother, Carolyn, died. He later said that her death scared him and made him start thinking about his health which is why he started working out and eating healthier. Pitts also opened a fitness company called Get Mean Fitness with his friend Matt Yani.

Pitts married Cory Logvin, on February 3, 2017.

== Production ==
- 2010 – Black Veil Brides (We Stitch These Wounds) – Songwriter
- 2011 – Black Veil Brides (Set the World on Fire) – Songwriter
- 2013 – Black Veil Brides (Wretched & Divine) – Songwriter / Engineered guitars
- 2014 – Black Veil Brides (Black Veil Brides) – Songwriter / Engineer
- 2016 - Thrown Into Exile (Safe Inside) – Producer / Writer / Engineer / Mixing / Mastering
- 2017 - AELONIA ("The End" single) – Producer / Writer / Engineer / Mixing / Mastering
- 2018 - Black Veil Brides (VALE) – Co-producer / Writer / Engineer
- 2019 - Aelonia (We Are One) - Producer, Writer, Mixing / Mastering
- 2020 - Black Veil Brides (Re-Stitch These Wounds) – Producer / Songwriter / Engineer / Mixing / Mastering
- 2020 - Black Veil Brides ("Scarlet Cross" Single) - Producer, Writer, Engineer
- 2021 - Black Veil Brides (The Phantom Tomorrow) - Producer, Writer, Engineer
- 2022 - Black Veil Brides (The Mourning) - Composer, Lyricist, Writer
- 2023 - Black Veil Brides (Temple Of Love Ft. VV) - Producer
- 2024 - Black Veil Brides (Bleeders) - Producer, Writer
- 2025 - Black Veil Brides ("Certainty" Single) - Composer, Producer
