= Jinxx =

American guitarist (born 1981)

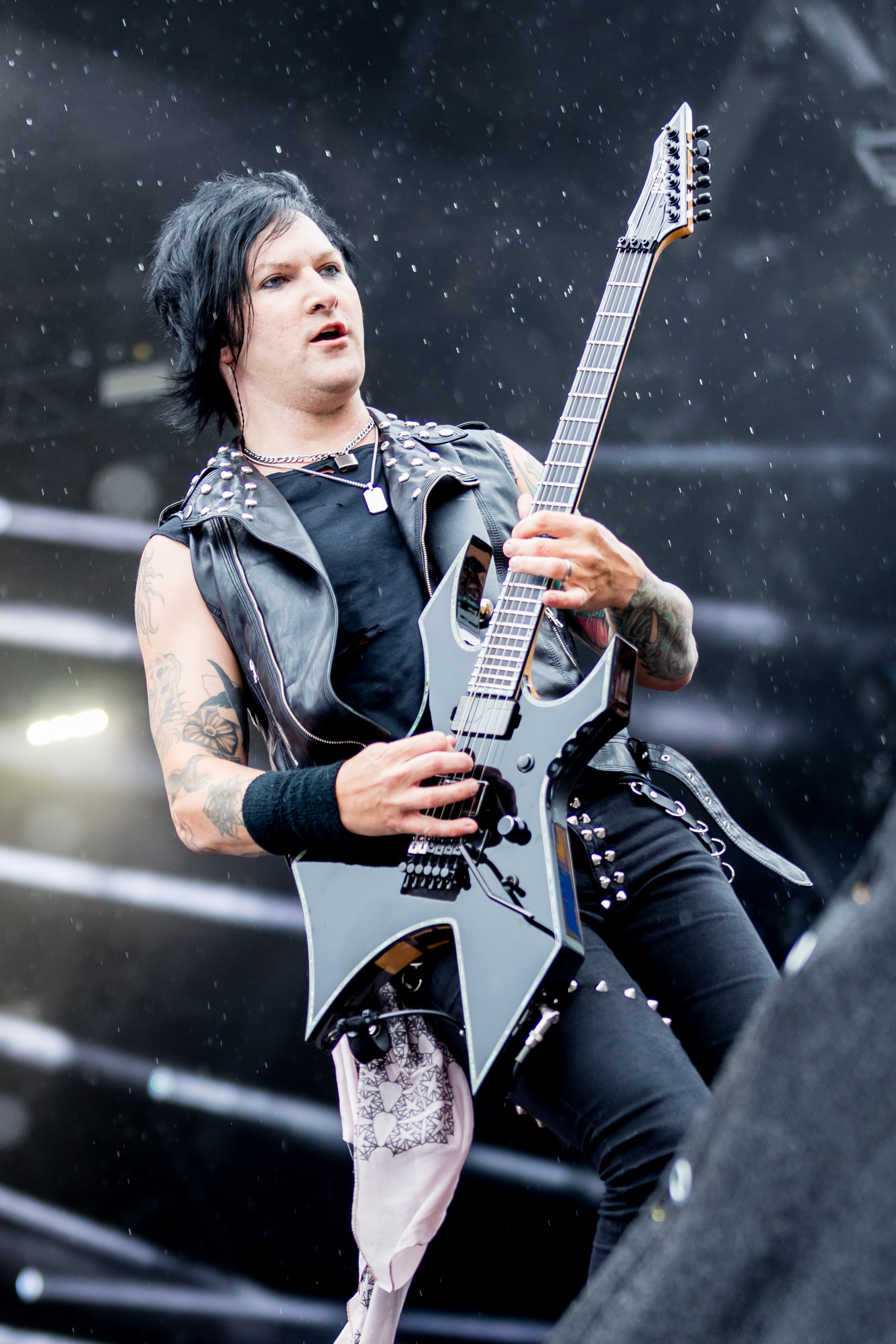
- Jinxx in 2022

Background information
- Born: Jeremy Miles Ferguson; January 7, 1981 (age 45); Webster City, Iowa, U.S.
- Genres: Hard rock; heavy metal; alternative metal; glam metal; metalcore
- Occupations: Musician; songwriter
- Instruments: Guitar; violin; cello; keyboards; vocals
- Years active: 2006–present
- Member of: Black Veil Brides

Jeremy Miles Ferguson (born January 7, 1981), better known by the stage name Jinxx, is an American musician best known as the rhythm guitarist and violinist of the rock band Black Veil Brides.

== History ==
Jinxx joined Black Veil Brides in mid-2009 when Andy Biersack was forming his band in Hollywood, California. He had also played in bands The Dreaming, Amen, among others. He got his first guitar when he was two, and started playing live shows with his father at age eight, playing in local bars in Iowa. He is influenced by classical composers Bach and Beethoven. The first album he ever owned was Metallica's fourth album, ...And Justice for All, and he learned to play every track. He and fellow Black Veil Brides guitarist Jake Pitts won Revolver Magazine's Golden Gods Award for "Best Guitarists 2012".

== Personal life ==
Jinxx married West End theatre dancer/actress Alice Mogg on September 16, 2018, in London. She is the niece of singer Phil Mogg of classic rock band UFO, and sister of Nigel Mogg, former bassist of The Quireboys. The couple had a son in late 2020.

In December 2019, Jinxx made a post on his Instagram confirming that he has epilepsy. A day later, he posted another message thanking everyone for the positive response he received after revealing it. He has since run a few auctions of some of his Black Veil Brides tour memorabilia from which some of the proceeds were donated to the Epilepsy Foundation. Jinxx was diagnosed with epilepsy at 27 years old, after experiencing a tonic clonic seizure on stage, Jinxx struggled for years to find the medication that worked for him, but he has now been seizure free since August 2019.

As of 2023. Jinxx has begun working on a psychological horror movie Inhabitant with director Joss Refauvelet, inspired by true events from his childhood. He is producing and providing the music for the movie, as well as making a cameo appearance in it.

== Musical style and influences ==
Jinxx has cited major influences such as Randy Rhoads, Metallica, Megadeth, Danny Elfman, Johann Sebastian Bach, Ludwig van Beethoven, Pyotr Ilyich Tchaikovsky, Wolfgang Amadeus Mozart, and Domenico Scarlatti.

== Discography ==
- 2006 – The Dreaming (Dreamo EP) – Songwriter, composer, guitars, violins
- 2008 – The Dreaming (Etched In Blood) – Songwriter, guitars, backing vocals
- 2010 – Black Veil Brides (We Stitch These Wounds) – Songwriter, guitars, strings, keys, backing vocals
- 2011 – Black Veil Brides (Set The World on Fire) – Songwriter, guitars, strings, keys, backing vocals
- 2013 – Black Veil Brides (Wretched & Divine) – Songwriter, composer, guitars, strings, keys, backing vocals
- 2014 – Black Veil Brides (Black Veil Brides) – Songwriter, guitars, strings, keys, backing vocals
- 2016 – September Mourning (Volume II) – Violins on "Skin and Bones"
- 2017 – Marty Friedman (Wall of Sound) – Collaboration, violins on "Sorrow and Madness"
- 2018 – Black Veil Brides (Vale) – Songwriter, composer, guitars, strings, keys
- 2018 – Dianthus (Worth Living For) – Producer, strings
- 2019 – Aesthetic Perfection (Into The Black) – Guitars
- 2020 – Black Veil Brides ("Scarlet Cross" Single) – Songwriter, guitars, strings, keys
- 2021 – Black Veil Brides (The Phantom Tomorrow) – Songwriter, guitars, strings, keys

== Filmography ==
- 2012 – Legion Of The Black (Black Veil Brides) – Composer, actor (as The Mystic)
- 2012 – Sebastian Bach: Kicking and Screaming and Touring (TV Special) – Performance as himself
- 2013 – Black Veil Brides in the Studio: The Making of Wretched and Divine (Documentary) – Appearance as himself
- 2015 – Alive and Burning (Black Veil Brides) – Performance as himself
- 2017 – Escape Room (Lionsgate) – Composer, original score
- 2023 – Inhabitant (In production) – Producer, creative director, actor, composer, original score
