= Harris Grade =

- Origin: Hollywood, California; USA
- Genres: Post-hardcore; Emo; Pop punk
- Years active: 2005–present
- Members: Robyn August Reinstadler, Caleb Healey, Alex von Hollen, Jason Friday, Greg Fulleman
- Website: 'Harris Grade' on MySpace

Harris Grade is a post-hardcore band from Hollywood, California, established in 2005.

== Album ==
In 2010, the band self-released their album, Lipstick Politics, at The Troubadour in West Hollywood. The album received a positive review from Behind the Hype.

The band released a music video for the title track that featured cameos from Max Green of Escape the Fate, and Jewel Shepard from The Return of the Living Dead.

== Touring ==
In 2010 Harris Grade earned a spot on the Pomona, California date of the Warped Tour 2010 through the Ernie Ball Battle of the Bands.

== Members ==
Current

- Robyn August Reinstadler - lead vocals, lyrics
- Caleb Healey - lead guitar
- Alex von Hollen - guitar
- Jason Friday - bass, backing vocals
- Greg Fulleman - drums

== Discography ==
Release date	Title
2010	'Lipstick Politics'
2009	'Hold on for your life'

== Videography ==
- Lipstick Politics (2010)
