= Omar Espinosa =

American guitarist

- Born: Omar David Espinosa; 7 August 1984 (age 41)
- Genres: Post-hardcore; metalcore; screamo; emo; alternative metal; alternative rock
- Occupations: Musician; producer
- Instrument: Guitar
- Years active: 2003–present
- Formerly of: Perfect Like Me; Escape the Fate; LoveHateHero
- Website: Official Twitter
- Children: 4

Omar David Espinosa (born August 7, 1984) is an American musician, best known for being the rhythm guitarist of the original lineup of Escape the Fate from mid 2004 to late 2007.

== Career ==
=== Escape the Fate (2004–2007) ===
In 2003, Omar Espinosa was asked to be lead guitarist in the rock band Lovehatehero. He left the year after to join Escape the Fate, who became known in the local Nevada scene very soon after. In 2006, the band released their first EP and album, There's No Sympathy for the Dead and Dying Is Your Latest Fashion, on Epitaph Records. In late 2007, during the Black on Black Tour with Blessthefall, Espinosa left for personal issues.

=== Perfect Like Me (2008–2012) ===
After leaving Escape the Fate, he wrote and recorded a few songs with the band The Black and White City. Later, Omar started the band Perfect Like Me, He along with the other members released an EP entitled She's Poison. Omar decided to leave Perfect Like Me in 2010, as a partial withdrawal from music and out of devotion to his family. In 2010 and 2011, Espinosa produced for the band Sky Diamond City.

In 2011, Espinosa co-wrote two songs with the band Falling in Reverse. Falling in Reverse is fronted by Espinosa's friend and former bandmate from Escape the Fate, Ronnie Radke. The songs he contributed to are "Don't Mess with Ouija Boards" and "Goodbye Graceful" which appear on the album The Drug in Me Is You. The album was released on 26 July 2011.

As of 19 January 2012, Espinosa has rejoined Perfect Like Me. On 6 February, Omar Espinosa made a guest appearance on stage performing "Situations" and "Not Good Enough for Truth in Cliche" with Escape the Fate. Despite these developments, his return to music making is temporary, as a result of this Omar decided to leave Perfect Like Me in April 2012.

During late 2012 and early 2013, Omar starting releasing new material with friends and uploading them to his SoundCloud account. In June 2012, he also announced he was announcing more projects. He released 3 clips during December 2012 – January/February 2013 titled "Phenoketylnurics", "Madness", and "Brütal", alongside close friend/former Perfect Like Me member, Bryan Ross, under the pseudonym "Rockernaut" (also his studio's name).

=== Rockernaut Studio (2013–present) ===
Rockernaut Studio was founded in Westminster, Colorado by Omar Espinosa. It has been up and running now for 2 years. Since its launch, Omar has worked with artists such as his former bandmate Ronnie Radke (and his band Falling in Reverse) and Skip the Foreplay.

Currently, he is working on his solo project "Son of the Empire". The EP will feature artists such as Tyler Smith, Ronnie Radke, Max Green, and the album was due to be released in January 2014 with talk of a music video to follow, but a few months later the project was officially cancelled.

== Personal life ==
Omar married Jasmine Mikkelsen (now Espinosa) in 2010 and has four children. He resides in Los Angeles.

== Discography ==
Escape the Fate

- Escape the Fate (EP) (2005)
- There's No Sympathy for the Dead (2006)
- Dying Is Your Latest Fashion (2006)
- Situations (2007)

Perfect Like Me

- She's Poison (2010)

Son of the Empire

- TBA (2014; unreleased)

== Collaborations ==
Sky Diamond City

- "Siblings" and "What's it Called?" (Impostors, 2010)

Falling in Reverse

- "Don't Mess With Ouija Boards" and "Goodbye Graceful" (The Drug in Me Is You, 2011)
- "Rolling Stone" (Fashionably Late, 2013)

== Sources ==
- Falling in Reverse's tumblr blog
- Mibba Forums, Falling in Reverse
- Answers.com, Falling in Reverse
- Ronnie Radkes interviews in Jail on Escape the Fate.net
- Spirit of Metal, Biography of LoveHateHero
- Falling in Reverse Fansite, Ronnie and Omar
