= Falling in Reverse =

American rock band

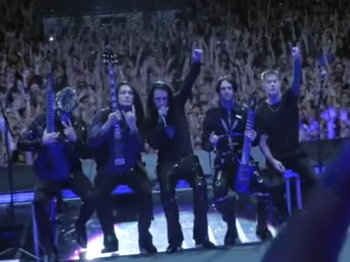
- Falling in Reverse performing in 2023. From left to right: Christian Thompson, Tyler Burgess, Ronnie Radke, Max Georgiev, and Luke Holland

Background information
- Origin: Las Vegas, Nevada, U.S.
- Genres: Post-hardcore; metalcore; rap metal; pop-punk; alternative metal; electronica
- Works: Discography
- Years active: 2008–present
- Label: Epitaph
- Spinoff of: Escape the Fate
- Members: Ronnie Radke; Christian Thompson; Luke Holland; Marc Okubo; Daniel "DL" Laskiewicz
- Past members: Max Green; Jacky Vincent; Ryan Seaman; Derek Jones; For more information see List of Falling in Reverse band members
- Website: fallinginreverse.com

Falling in Reverse is an American rock band formed in Las Vegas, Nevada in 2008 by lead vocalist Ronnie Radke. Originally named From Behind These Walls, it was renamed Falling in Reverse shortly after formation. They are currently signed to Epitaph Records. The band has undergone numerous lineup changes, with Radke being the only remaining original member.

The band is currently led by lead vocalist Radke, alongside guitarists Christian Thompson and Marc Okubo, bassist Daniel "DL" Laskiewicz and drummer Luke Holland. The group released its debut album, The Drug in Me Is You, in July 2011, which peaked at No. 19 on the Billboard 200, selling 18,000 copies in its first week. It was certified gold by RIAA in December 2019. The band's second studio album, Fashionably Late, was released in 2013, which peaked at No. 17 on the Billboard 200. The band released their third album, Just Like You, in February 2015. Their fourth album, Coming Home, was released in 2017. Their fifth album, Popular Monster, was released on August 16, 2024.

== History ==
=== Formation (2008–2010) ===
In 2006, lead singer Ronnie Radke was involved in an altercation in Las Vegas that resulted in a friend fatally shooting 18-year-old Michael Cook in self-defense. While Radke did not shoot Cook, he was indicted on charges relating to owning brass knuckles that he took to the altercation. These charges, combined with Radke's past troubles with narcotics and rehab, led to five years probation. After he failed to report to his probation officer, he was arrested in June 2008, where his probation was revoked and he was mandated to serve his original sentence of two years in prison. At the time, Radke was the lead singer of post-hardcore band Escape the Fate, which, in 2006, released its debut album, Dying Is Your Latest Fashion. Following Radke's incarceration, he was ejected from the band and replaced by former Blessthefall lead singer Craig Mabbitt. Radke was released on December 12, 2010. Radke discussed his relationship with Escape the Fate members since his departure from the band, stating that they have tried to reconcile with Radke but he was uninterested in getting back on friendly terms with them claiming that they kicked him out and misinformed their fans about him. Radke stated in an interview,

"They make a whole album called This War Is Ours, and then they try to say, 'We didn't name that album after you, dude.' Which in fact, they did. I could be wrong; they could be talking about the war on terrorism or something. I don't know. But I just have a feeling that the record name was about me. They talk a lot of shit. It is always about forgive and forget, but there's some things that I would like to say. So I did. On the record."

During his time in prison, Radke formed a new band called From Behind These Walls. He officially began creating media with the band upon his release, but was later forced to change its name to Falling in Reverse due to copyright. In 2009, with Radke still in prison, he was able to launch a demo of his band, due to contacts with several musicians he had. The demo contains five songs, four of which were not put on the debut album The Drug in Me Is You. The original lineup consisted of Radke and bassist Nason Schoeffler, who helped find guitarist Jacky Vincent rhythm guitarist Derek Jones, and former The Bigger Lights drummer Ryan Seaman. Schoeffler quit the band in April 2011 and was replaced by Mika Horiuchi, formerly of the band Cellador, who also later departed from the band after issues with Radke.

=== The Drug in Me Is You and record deal (2010–2012) ===
In January 2011, the band began recording for the first time. The group announced on December 20 that it would go to Orlando, Florida to record a full-length debut album over a period of two months with a tentative release date of the first quarter of 2011. The band also confirmed that Radke's friend, Michael Baskette, who has worked on Blessthefall's album Witness and Radke on Escape the Fate's debut Dying Is Your Latest Fashion, would produce the album. It was soon confirmed that the band was signed with Epitaph Records, Radke's former label with Escape the Fate, and the band released its debut album in 2011. The album was soon titled The Drug in Me Is You and was slated for a July 26, 2011 release date, with pre-orders beginning on June 7. The eleven song track list was released soon after. With the help of Executive Producer Michael "Elvis" Baskette, mixing and tracking for the album concluded on April 2, 2011. The album spawned the singles "Raised by Wolves" and "The Drug in Me Is You". The band's first music video was released for "The Drug in Me Is You" on June 28, 2011, and was advertised by the New York Post the week before the album's release. The album was streamed via the band's website on July 15. The Drug in Me Is You was released in the United States on July 26, 2011 to mostly mixed reviews, but managed to sell 18,000 copies in its first week in the US charting at number 19 on the Billboard 200. A third single, "I'm Not a Vampire", was released a few months after the album's release on October 24 with an accompanying music video featuring Jeffree Star which features a satirical Celebrity Rehab theme, and reached over one million views in three days.

The songs for the debut album were all written by Radke during his imprisonment. Lead vocalist Ronnie Radke has often called the album a breakup record, but with a band and not a girl. Radke said that, "I would think all day, for days and days, [about] what people would want to hear. I would dissect my old album and read all the fan letters and the reasons why they loved my band and why they listened to it. And I wrote about that, but in different ways. I don't know why these kids love the tragedies that I write about. I guess they can relate to it."

To promote the album, the band announced the dates for its first live performances, which took place at the end of July following the album's release at certain locations in California, with one date scheduled in Texas on September 24, 2011. These shows were planned to be with supporting act Vampires Everywhere!. The July dates were postponed due to issues with guitarist Jacky Vincent's immigration visa, though the band voiced intentions to make these dates up. This meant that the band's first live performances would be at the Vans Warped Tour 2011 from August 10 to 14 for five shows on the Kia Kevin Says Stage throughout the western United States. The band played a few secret shows under the name "Goodbye Graceful" on August eighth and ninth in Anaheim and Los Angeles.

Following the release of the album and some Warped Tour 2011 appearances, the band announced its first headlining tour across the United States, with locations beginning in New Mexico, looping around the east coast, and concluding in Colorado. The tour took place from September to October 2011 with support acts Eyes Set to Kill and For All Those Sleeping. The band's first supporting tour was to be a ten-show tour in November 2011 with headliners Black Veil Brides and supporting acts Aiden and Drive-A, but was canceled after Black Veil Brides dropped out when their lead vocalist Andy Biersack broke his nose. Emmure replaced Falling in Reverse on the second half of the Take A Picture, It Lasts Longer Tour with We Came As Romans and the band played an exclusive show at KROQ on November 8 to make up for the canceled shows.

The bands started out its first headlining tour, The Drug in Me Is You Tour, in February 2012 with support from Skip the Foreplay and Oh, Sleeper. In January 2012, the band announced Mika Horiuchi's departure from the band, Falling in Reverse's frontman Ronnie Radke gave Altpress.com this exclusive statement regarding Horiuchi's departure from the band "Mika is not in the band and that's it. Nothing more to say right now but stay tuned kids, 2012 is our year." In January 2012, former I Am Ghost bassist Ron Ficarro began filling in as Falling in Reverse's The Drug in Me Is You Tour touring bassist due to the departure of former bassist Mika Horiuchi. Later on Ronnie announced on stage that Ron Ficarro was replacing Mika permanently. On February 6, 2012, former Escape the Fate member, Omar Espinosa made a guest appearance on stage performing "Situations" and "Not Good Enough for Truth In Cliché" (Although this could have been because Derek wasn't there). The band's third music video for its debut album's first single, "Raised by Wolves", was released on February 28, 2012.

In late August, Falling in Reverse announced a Fall/Winter headlining tour called "The Thug in Me is You Tour" with supporting acts Enter Shikari, I See Stars, Matt Toka and letlive.

=== Fashionably Late and Bury the Hatchet tour (2012–2014) ===
Vocalist Ronnie Radke had been hinting on Twitter that the group had been working on the band's second album, with tweets such as "You guys don't understand how many light years my next album is from the last one". He and bandmate Ron Ficarro tweeted pictures of them in the studio with Ryan Ogren working on some new music. Ronnie had said a little bit about the new album to Marshal Music News. He said that,

"The last record was so vengeful and bitter and spiteful – so everyone is wondering what I'm gonna sing about next. And I'm just not quite ready to let people know. I'm sorry. When people hear the new stuff though I promise you they will lose their mind. It's light years ahead of my last album. We're demoing new songs right now, as we speak, and I'm telling you, people are seriously gonna lose their mind."

During the band's performance at Dirt Fest 2012 in Birch Run Michigan, Radke announced to the crowd that it would be the group's last show before returning to the studio for the band's second album. Ronnie also said in an interview that the band would be in the studio late 2012 with demos already and hoping for an early 2013 release. In issue number 1442 of Kerrang! Magazine, Ronnie Radke announced in an interview that "The record's finished! That's what we did after the Warped Tour. We just didn't tell anybody!" He also said "[it will be released] early next year [summer 2013]!"

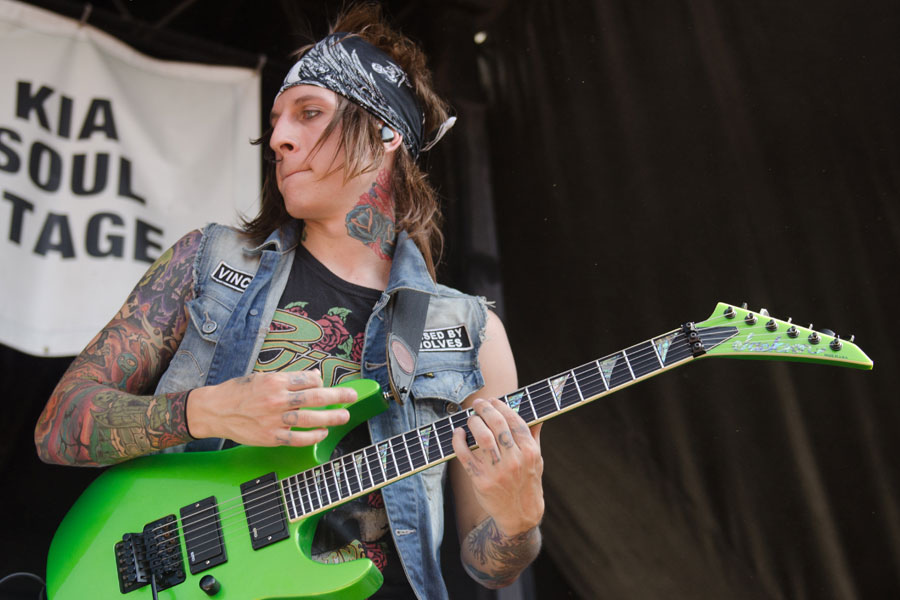
Jacky Vincent in 2012

On May 7 the band released the first single and music video, "Alone", from the second album, titled, Fashionably Late. The cover, merchandise, and a June 18, 2013 release date was revealed on May 7 as well.

To promote the album, Falling in Reverse would be on tour from May to July 2013, including the Vans Warped Tour 2013. On May 13 Falling in Reverse announced on Twitter the band had cancelled tour dates due to lead singer Radke was expecting the birth of his first child with his fiancé Crissy Henderson. Falling in Reverse officially stated on Facebook

"Our apologies but Falling in Reverse has to cancel the rest of the dates scheduled in May. Ronnie will not be able to appear as his girlfriend is about to give birth to their first child and he needs to be by her side. Thanks for your understanding. See you soon."

The band also canceled the dates to play Warped Tour. The tour released the following statement regarding the band's decision "Falling in Reverse are withdrawing from performing on this summer's Warped Tour. Lead singer Ronnie Radke's fiancé is pregnant with their first child who is due shortly.

On May 21, the title track, "Fashionably Late" was released as the second single. Later, on May 30, the song, "Born to Lead" was streamed through YouTube. The entire album was uploaded to Epitaph Records' YouTube channel on June 12, allowing fans to listen to the album before the official release date.

Following the cancellation of dates for the band's tour and Warped Tour, Falling in Reverse celebrated the release of Fashionably Late with a special performance at the Roxy in West Hollywood, California, on June 18, 2013. The set of one hour was broadcast online and presented by Hot Topic.

On October 28, 2013, Falling in Reverse, along with Ronnie's former band Escape the Fate, announced that they would be touring together, with Falling in Reverse headlining, on the Bury The Hatchet Tour. The bands posted a video through Alternative Press with Ronnie and Escape the Fate singer Craig Mabbit being interviewed about the tour, stating that the tour came about due to the groups' acceptances of each other. During the tour, Ronnie made appearances on stage with Escape the Fate, singing the singles from Escape the Fate debut album Dying Is Your Latest Fashion ("Situations" and "Not Good Enough for Truth in Cliché").

In March 2014, Radke announced that the band had begun recording its third album. On May 12, 2014, it was announced by Alternative Press that Falling in Reverse had parted ways with bassist Ron Ficarro, reporting that former Escape the Fate bassist Max Green (who announced his departure from Escape the Fate just 3 days before on May 9, six months after rejoining Escape the Fate) would be his replacement. Ronnie is quoted as saying

"Ron was probably the best bass player I've ever played with, but at this moment in time I feel it is best to part ways with him. I respect him and wish nothing but the best for him. Max quitting Escape The Fate was like a godsend. It was a no brainer to have him join. I've known him half my life and this will be a great new chapter to start. "

=== Just Like You and departure of Jacky Vincent (2014–2016) ===
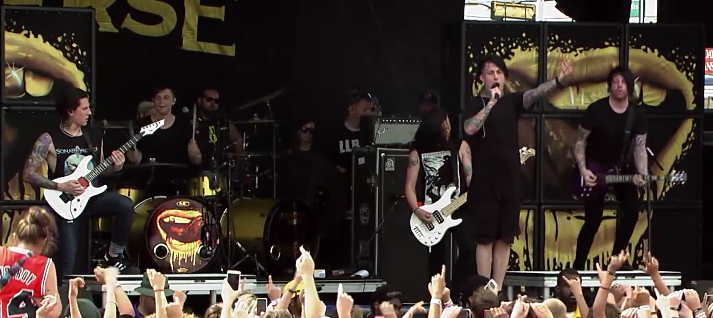
Falling in Reverse in 2014

In an interview with MTV, Radke stated that the next album would be nothing like the single Alone from Fashionably Late as it has no raps throughout the album; he stated that it is heavier and will contain more screams, moving his passion for rapping into his solo career. Radke explained in another interview that the third album will be more like a "sequel" to the Escape the Fate album Dying Is Your Latest Fashion and is aimed to be nostalgic to people who were fans of the band since then.

In August it was announced that the band will be supporting Black Veil Brides on their headline tour across America throughout October and November dubbed "The Black Mass" and will also be supported by Set It Off and Drama Club. On October 6, 2014, a month before the Black Mass tour started, it was announced that Max Green had left the band due to personal issues unrelated to the band. The departure was amicable.

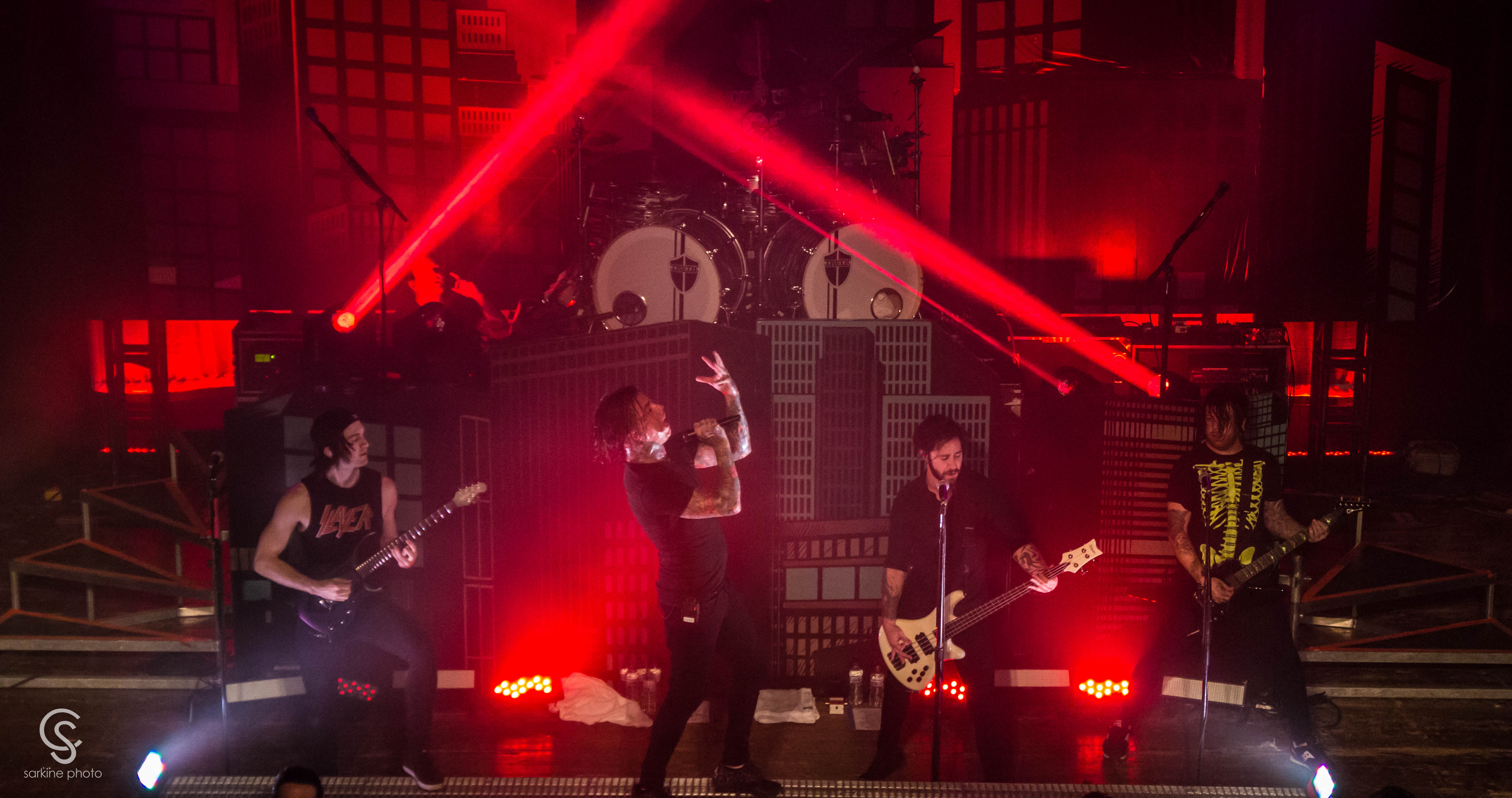
Falling in Reverse in 2015

In February 2015, touring bassist Jonathan Wolfe was replaced by the official new member, and former Black Tide bassist, Zakk Sandler.

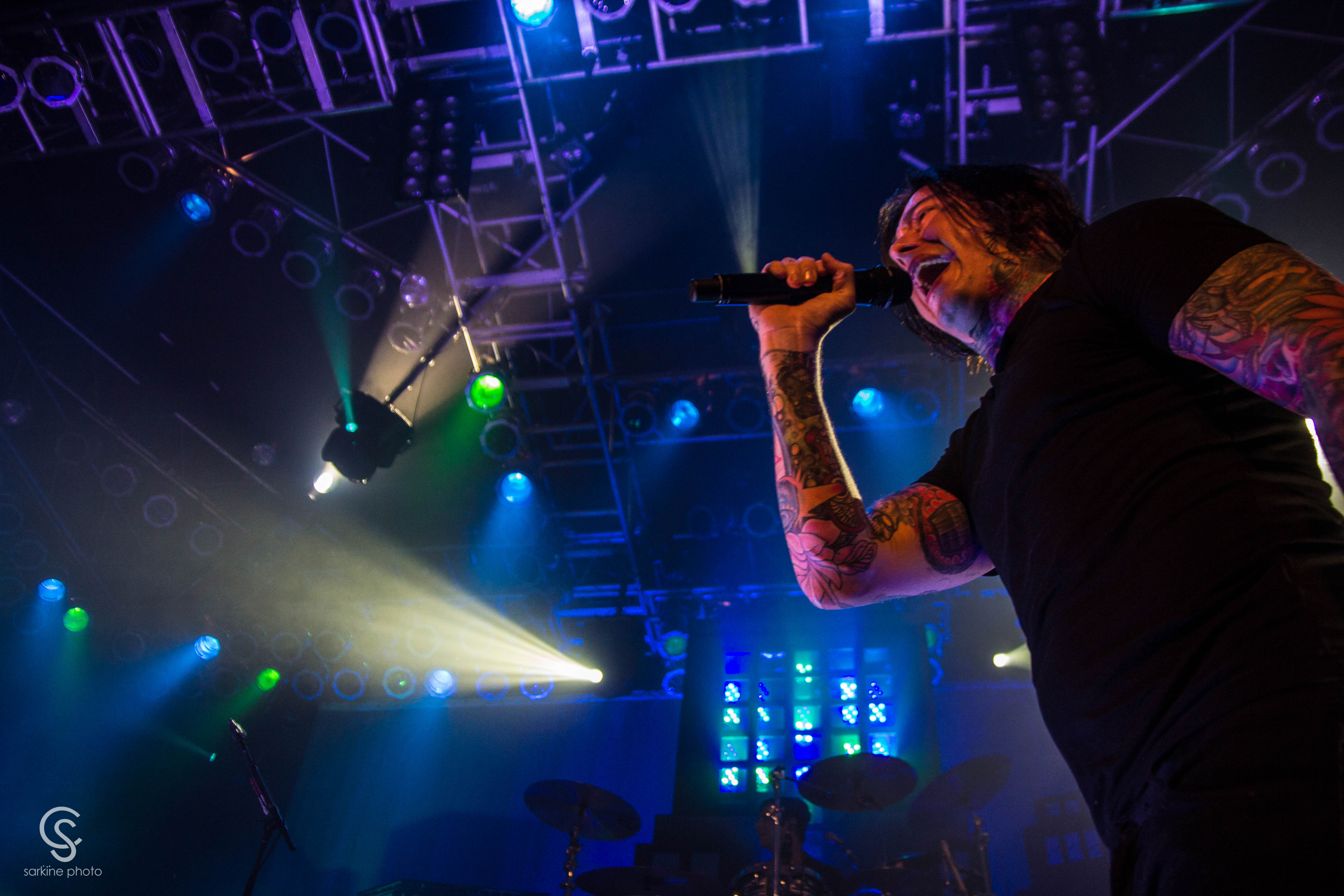
Falling in Reverse at the House of Blues during the Super Villains Tour in 2015.

On March 16, 2015, Falling in Reverse announced a US tour called Ronnie Radke's Three-Ring Circus. The tour had three acts; a performance by opening band Ghost Town, then Falling in Reverse performing the entire Dying Is Your Latest Fashion album from Radke's days in Escape the Fate, followed by Falling in Reverse performing original songs. The tour lasted from April 24 to June 6.

On October 30, 2015, lead guitarist Jacky Vincent left the band on good terms before the band's fall tour with Attila, Metro Station and Assuming We Survive to focus on his solo career. On November 4, 2015, Christian Thompson confirmed himself as the new lead guitarist of the band. The video for the single Chemical Prisoner was released on January 27, 2016. The single performed moderately well on UK rock radio.

=== Coming Home and departure of Ryan Seaman (2016–2018) ===
On January 6, 2016, the band members announced that they had begun work on their next album stating that it would be "It's a huge left turn. It sounds like nothing we’ve ever done. Every song is very vibey, There's more feeling in it instead of a lot of metal.", further stating that "We’re challenging ourselves now more than we ever have in the weirdest ways possible because you would think writing the craziest solo or riffs would be the challenging part. But the challenging part is trying to stick to a theme and not go all over the place like we would normally do."

In January 2017, Radke began performing guitar for the band. On January 20, 2017, the band announced their next album Coming Home. On March 21, the band released the third single from the album "Broken" and was released on Daniel P. Carter's show on BBC Radio 1. Coming Home was released on April 7, 2017. Around the time of its release, it was rumoured that drummer Ryan Seaman parted ways with the band after he began releasing music as the drummer of I Dont Know How but They Found Me. This was confirmed when the band performed on May 8 without Seaman and Chris Kamrada playing drums as a touring member. The band announced that they would be at the Chicago Air Open 2017. The band announced their tour to promote the album in the United States, the tour would be called "Coming Home to Madness Tour" and would last from September to October 2017 along with All That Remains. Later they announced their tour of Europe along with The Word Alive and Dead Girls Academy.

=== Non-album singles and death of Derek Jones (2018–2022) ===
On February 23, 2018, the band released a song called "Losing My Mind". On March 12, 2018, while on tour lead guitarist Christian Thompson tore his rotator cuff, posting on his Instagram account that he would not be continuing on tour with the band whilst he underwent medical treatment. On April 16, 2018, Thompson officially announced via Instagram that he left the band.

On June 26, 2018, the band released "Losing My Life" along with a music video as a continuation of where the music video for "Losing My Mind" ended and featured a new line-up for the band, consisting of Tyler Burgess on bass, Max Georgiev as lead guitarist, drummer Brandon "Rage" Richter, and Zakk Sandler on keyboards and rhythm guitar. The band also announced that they will be performing selected dates at the final year of the annual Vans Warped Tour with the new line up. Shortly after the Warped Tour the band announced an acoustic tour called The Roast of Ronnie Radke. Richter silently left the band shortly before the tour. In the middle of the tour, the band canceled the tour due to a personal family matter.

On April 8, 2019, a new music video for the song "Drugs" was released. Sandler did not appear in the video. The video features Christian "CC" Coma playing drums and guest vocals from Slipknot and Stone Sour frontman Corey Taylor. Radke spoke on Twitter about Sandler saying: "We all love Zakk, one of my favorite people ever but he wants to focus on home life with his family and business he runs at the moment, it does not mean he will not be touring with us next tour", confirming that he is still a member of the band, although after several shows it was never known if he would return to the band, fans asked Sandler if he would continue in the band but he never said anything for what he can assume he left the band. Sandler later confirmed his departure. The band announced their headliner tour called Episode III with support bands such as Ice Nine Kills, From Ashes to New and New Years Day. Black Veil Brides drummer, CC, also announced that he would participate in the tour. The band played at the Self Help Fest 2019. The band announced their main tour Episode IV with supporting acts of Crown the Empire and rapper Tom MacDonald, but weeks before the tour began the band decided to cancel it due to family problems with guitarist Derek Jones. The band announced that they would play at the Good Things Festival in Australia.

On November 20, 2019, a new single titled "Popular Monster" was released, depicting Radke exploring his demons and eventually transforming into a werewolf. On December 17, 2019, the band's debut album The Drug in Me Is You was certified gold record by the RIAA, to celebrate that the album won gold the band organized a tour called The Drug In Me Is Gold Tour with supporting acts like Escape the Fate and The Word Alive. They also announced that they would play all the songs on the album. The band announced that they will be supporting a tour with Asking Alexandria called Like House On Fire World Tour along with Wage War and Hyro the Hero. The tour was postponed due to the COVID-19 pandemic. On February 13, 2020, the band released the single "The Drug In Me Is Reimagined", which is the piano version of the single "The Drug In Me Is You". Regarding the single, Radke said he wanted to give the fans something special: "This song was not made with the hope of gaining new fans — this was made specifically for the fans that have been here from the beginning. I wanted to strip down the music to show you how raw the lyrics actually are. So you can feel the song in a completely different way."

On April 21, 2020, Radke announced via Twitter that Derek Jones had died. His cause of death was revealed later in Radke's book "I Can Explain" as subdural hematoma. On July 14, 2020, the band released the song "Carry On", the song was planned to be included in the Coming Home album but in the end it was not included. Months earlier, Ronnie showed the song on his Twitch channel.

On October 18, 2020, Thompson announced via Instagram that he was returning to the band.

Sometime before the shows, Tyler Burgess and Johnny Mele left the band, with Wes Horton III taking over permanently for bass and backing vocals and Luke Holland as a touring drummer. The band announced that they would return to the stage after a year and a half due to the COVID-19 Pandemic. The band announced their participation in "Welcome to Rockville Festival 2021" with bands like Metallica, Lynyrd Skynyrd, Mudvayne, Anthrax, among others. The band also announced their participation in Rocklahoma 2021, along with bands like Slipknot, Rob Zombie, Limp Bizkit, Chevelle, Halestorm, Anthrax and more.

=== Neon Zombie EP and Popular Monster (2022–present) ===
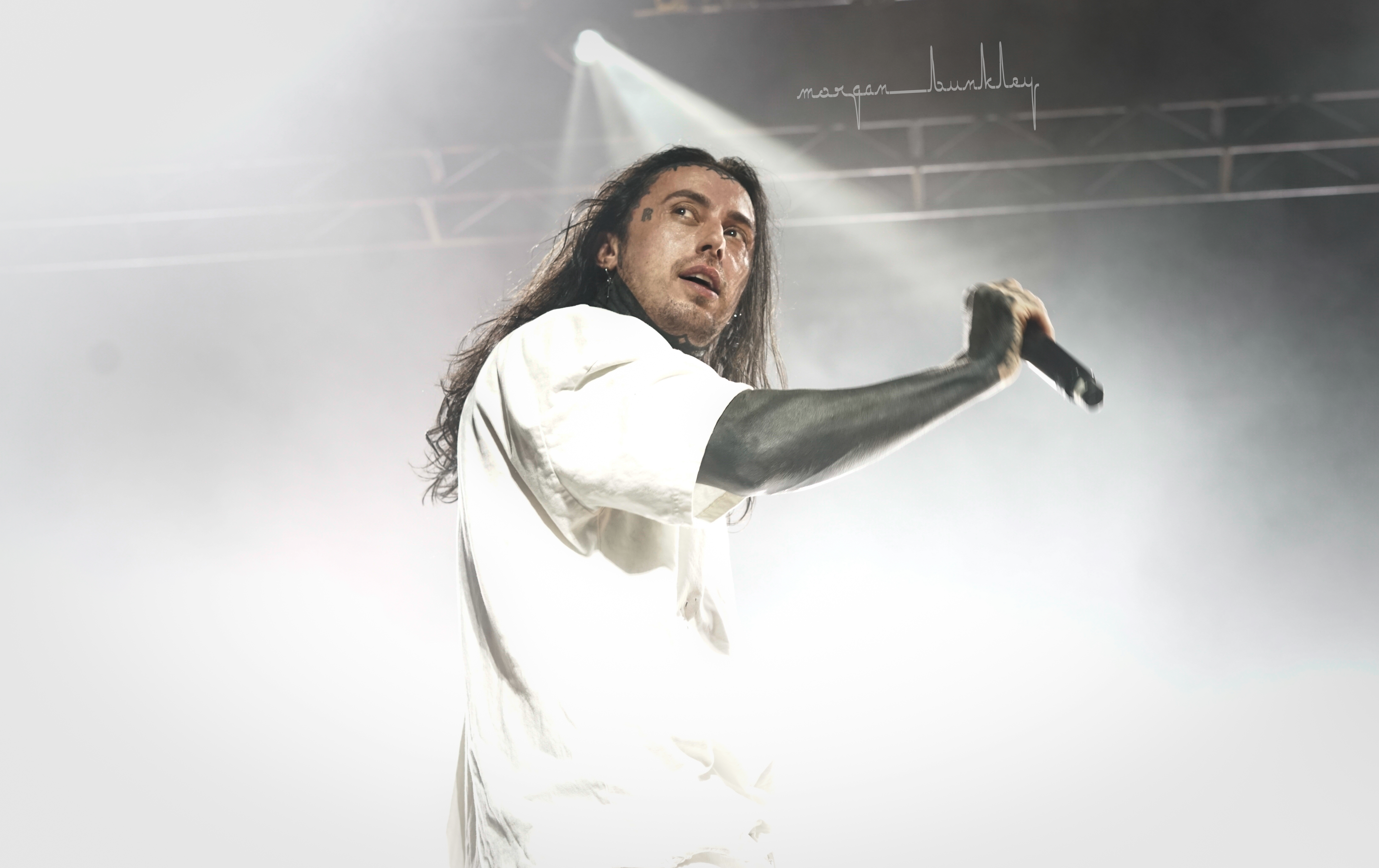
Frontman Ronnie Radke in 2022

On January 5, 2022, the band released the single "Zombified" via live stream which was initially the first single from their upcoming Neon Zombie EP. "Zombified" was used by professional wrestler and Radke's former partner Saraya as her entrance music during her time in All Elite Wrestling. Previously the band had announced their Live From The Unknown tour in the United States accompanied by the bands Wage War and Hawthorne Heights and the American singer and rapper Jeris Johnson. The band announced that they will perform at the 2022 "Inkcarceration Festival" on Saturday, July 16 as part of the headlining bands. They also announced more performances like their "Aftershock Festival 2022" performance. The band also announced the "Rockzilla Summer Tour" for the summer alongside Papa Roach, Hollywood Undead and Bad Wolves.

On May 28, 2022, the band released the single "Voices in My Head". The video reintroduced Tyler Burgess having returned to the band as a bass player. The band was announced to perform at WILL Rock Fest 2022 in Illinois but had to cancel their performance as the band had their laptops stolen, however the band was able to perform at subsequent music festivals including a performance for over 20,000 people. The band announced a mini tour alongside Escape the Fate and Fame On Fire in December. On January 31, 2023, the band released the single "Watch the World Burn", which became the first single produced by the band to rank on the Billboard Hot 100 chart. On June 26, 2023, the band released a cover of Papa Roach's "Last Resort".

On May 7, 2024, the band released single "Ronald", featuring Alex Terrible of Slaughter to Prevail and rapper Tech N9ne. On the same day they announced their fifth studio album Popular Monster, which was originally due to be released on July 26, 2024, before being pushed to August 16, 2024, and the Popular MonsTOUR II: World Domination with their collaborator Tech N9ne, Black Veil Brides, Dance Gavin Dance, Jeris Johnson and Nathan James.

On June 6, 2024, the band released single, "All My Life", featuring country rap singer Jelly Roll. A music video for the track "Prequel" was released on August 16, 2024, coinciding with the album release.

The band's December 2024 UK tour was canceled because Radke was denied entry into the country over his prison sentence.

On May 20, 2025, the band released the single, "God Is a Weapon" featuring Marilyn Manson. It was followed by "All My Women" featuring Hardy, which was released on August 8. On September 14, 2026, the band released the single, "Joseph", featuring Corey Taylor of Slipknot and Serj Tankian of System of a Down.

== Musical style and lyrics ==
Falling in Reverse has been categorized as post-hardcore, metalcore, pop-punk, rap metal, alternative metal, emo, electronica, alternative rock, hard rock, and glam metal. John D. Buchanan of AllMusic referred to them simply as a "core" band.

Falling in Reverse's sound has at times also been described as emo with pop-stylized choruses and a blend between pop and metalcore. Frontman Ronnie Radke voiced his opinion on these styles in a tweet, in which he said: "It's so much easier to write a fucking metalcore song, than sit down and write a fucking hit single that breaks the Billboard Hot 100 charts. [I'm] so tired of these clowns acting like making metal is some crazy ass impossible concept that only a few know how to do, here's your chord profession 0000-000-000-1-000-000-000-1 congratulations. You just played the open chord for 14 fucking albums."

The band's second album, Fashionably Late, included hip hop and electronic elements with the addition of rapping. Falling in Reverse's recent singles are stripped down, orchestral piano ballad remakes of previously released songs, "The Drug in Me Is You" and "I'm Not a Vampire", re-dubbed "The Drug in Me Is Reimagined" and "I'm Not a Vampire (Revamped)", respectively.

Radke commented that "in the same songs it sounds like Norma Jean or Underoath with Katy Perry choruses." According to Radke some of the band's lyrical tones are, "arrogant, [it's something] like rappers do mostly." This is because Radke has cited Eminem, Beastie Boys and Lordz of Brooklyn as two of his major influences, so much so that he even included a beat made by Eminem and Dr. Dre during a breakdown on the track "Sink or Swim".

The band has explored topics such as anger, critics, addiction, abuse, sexual intercourse and interpersonal relationships. The lyrical content of the band's music is inspired mainly by vocalist Radke's personal experiences, which include his mother, the corruption of Las Vegas, and his incarceration/release from prison due to multiple run-ins with the law involving narcotics and battery charges related to the death of Michael Cook. No songs by the band to date concern love because Radke stated that, "...I'm not going to lie ... and try to write songs on how much I love somebody. I do have love, but there will be a lot of songs about just what I've been through." Several songs focused on his departure from Escape the Fate after the group kicked him out and replaced him with former Blessthefall singer Craig Mabbitt, with songs by the band that directly attacked both Mabbitt and Escape the Fate's bassist Max Green.

== Band members ==
Current

- Ronnie Radke – lead vocals (2008–present), keyboards (2008–2018, 2019–present), rhythm guitar (2017–2018)
- Christian Thompson – lead guitar, backing vocals (2015–2018, 2024–present), rhythm guitar (2020–2024)
- Luke Holland – drums, percussion (2021–present)
- Marc Okubo – rhythm guitar (2024–present)
- Daniel "DL" Laskiewicz – bass, backing vocals (2025–present)

== Discography ==
Studio albums

- The Drug in Me Is You (2011)
- Fashionably Late (2013)
- Just Like You (2015)
- Coming Home (2017)
- Popular Monster (2024)

== Awards and accolades ==
Year	Nominated work or individual	Award	Result	Place	Ref
2011	Falling in Reverse	Alternative Press: Band of the Year Award	Won	3rd	
2011	"I'm Not a Vampire"	Loudwire Magazine's Cagematch Hall of Fame Award	Won	—	
2011	"I'm Not a Vampire"	Revolver Magazine's The 10 Best Music Videos of 2011	Won	9th	
2011	"The Drug in Me Is You"	Revolver Magazine's The 5 Best Songs of 2011	Won	5th	
2012	Ryan Seaman	Alternative Press: Drummer of the Year Award	Won	2nd	
2012	Jacky Vincent	Alternative Press: Guitarist of the Year Award	Won	1st	
2012	Ronnie Radke	Alternative Press: Vocalist of the Year Award	Won	2nd	
2012	"The Drug in Me Is You"	Kerrang! Awards 2012: Best Single	Nominated	—	
2012	Falling in Reverse	Kerrang! Awards 2012: Best International Newcomer	Won	—	
2012	Ronnie Radke	Kerrang! Awards 2012: Villain of the Year	Nominated	—	
2013	Ronnie Radke	Alternative Press: Best APTV Video	Won	1st	
2013	Jacky Vincent	Alternative Press: Guitarist of the Year Award	Won	3rd	
2014	Jacky Vincent	Alternative Press Music Awards: Best Guitarist	Nominated	—	
2014	Ryan Seaman	Alternative Press Music Awards: Best Drummer	Nominated	—	
2014	"Alone"	Alternative Press Music Awards: Song of the Year	Nominated	—	
2014	"Bad Girls Club"	Kerrang! Awards 2014: Best Video	Nominated	—	
2015	Jacky Vincent	Alternative Press Music Awards: Best Guitarist	Nominated	—	
2016	"Just Like You"	Alternative Press Music Awards: Song of the Year	Nominated	—	
2017	"Falling in Reverse"	Alternative Press Music Awards: Best Live Band	Won	—	
2020	"Popular Monster"	Octane Sirius XM: Top 30 Octane Big 'Uns Countdown Songs	Won	1st	
2022	"Zombified"	Richmond International Film Festival: Best of Festival, Music Video	Won	—	
2022	"Zombified"	Octane Sirius XM: Top 37 Octane "Big 'Uns of the Year"	Won	7th	
2022	"Voices in My Head"	Octane Sirius XM: Top 37 Octane "Big 'Uns of the Year"	Won	1st	
2023	"Watch the World Burn"	Berlin Music Video Awards: Best Director	Nominated		
2024	Popular Monster	Billboard Music Awards: Top Hard Rock Albums	Nominated	–	
2024	"All My Life"	Billboard Music Awards: Top Hard Rock Songs	Won	–	
2024	"Ronald"	Billboard Music Awards: Top Hard Rock Songs	Nominated	–	
2025	"All My Life"	iHeartRadio Music Awards: Rock Song of the Year	Nominated	–	
2026	"Bad Guy"	iHeartRadio Music Awards: Rock Song of the Year	Nominated	–	
"—" denotes a nomination that did not place or places were not relevant in the award.
