= God Is a Weapon =

2025 single by Falling in Reverse and Marilyn Manson

Single by Falling in Reverse and Marilyn Manson
- Released: May 20, 2025
- Genre: Industrial metal; post-hardcore
- Length: 3:35
- Label: Epitaph
- Songwriters: Ronnie Radke; Cody Quistad; Tyler Smyth; Marilyn Manson
- Producers: Smyth; Radke; Charles Massabo (vocal producer)

Falling in Reverse singles chronology
"Prequel" (2024)	"God Is a Weapon" (2025)	"All My Women" (2025)

Marilyn Manson singles chronology
"In the Air Tonight" (2025)	"God Is a Weapon" (2025)	"Exit Wound" (2026)

Music video
- "God Is a Weapon" on YouTube

"God Is a Weapon" is a song by American rock band Falling in Reverse featuring American rock musician Marilyn Manson. The power ballad was released on May 20, 2025 by Epitaph Records. It was released as a standalone single, and was issued the same day Falling In Reverse announced a North American arena tour, titled the "God Is a Weapon Tour".

== Background and composition ==
A collaboration between Falling in Reverse vocalist Ronnie Radke and Marilyn Manson's eponymous vocalist was first teased after Radke was photographed at Manson's birthday party in January 2025. Radke indicated a collaboration was forthcoming when he shared a photograph on social media of him and Manson later that month. The song is a collaboration between Falling in Reverse and Manson. It contains vocals from Manson, and was written by Radke and Manson, alongside Wage War's Cody Quistad and Tyler Smyth of DangerKids.

"God Is a Weapon" was described by Neon Music as "industrial meets post-hardcore with sharp metallic edges," while Revolver proclaimed the song a "massive power ballad revolving around the line 'If God is a woman/Then God is a weapon.'" The two vocalists each sing lead on a verse, with Loudwire calling the song a "slow-burner with an ethereal feel that gets much heavier during the second chorus."

== Release and promotion ==
The song was released as a digital download, on May 20, 2025, the same date Falling in Reverse announced a North American arena tour, titled the "God Is a Weapon Tour". The tour features support from Hollywood Undead, Point North, Slaughter to Prevail, Sleep Theory, Tech N9ne, and Wage War. In response to criticism levied against Falling in Reverse on social media for working with Marilyn Manson and several of the bands opening on the tour, Radke issued a statement, thanking long-time fans for not being "punk ass, pussy ass bitches that whine and cry over who bands tour with and who bands work with." He described the social media users who were critical as being "fucking crazy, fucking delusional, online all the time." The tour begins on August 10 and ends on September 26.

== Music video ==
The song's music video was directed by Jensen Noen, who had previously directed videos for In This Moment and Motionless in White. The video stars Dana Dentata, who provided backing vocals on the title track to Marilyn Manson's 2017 album Heaven Upside Down.

== Commercial performance ==
The song debuted at number 67 on the UK Singles Downloads Chart and at number 70 on the UK Singles Sales Chart. The following week, the song peaked at 58 on the UK Singles Downloads Chart, and at number 61 on the UK Singles Sales Chart, which resulted in the song debuting at number 32 on the UK Rock & Metal Singles Chart. The song was also successful in the United States, peaking at number 24 on Billboard's Digital Song Sales, and number 26 on Hot Rock & Alternative Songs.

== Credits and personnel ==
Credits adapted from Tidal.

- Marilyn Manson – vocals and composition
- Charles Massabo – vocal production
- Ronnie Radke – vocals, composition and production
- Tyler Smyth – composition, engineering, production, mixing and mastering
- Cody Quistad – composition

== Charts ==
=== Weekly charts ===
Weekly chart performance for "God Is a Weapon"
Chart (2025)	Peak position
New Zealand Hot Singles (RMNZ)	15
Russia Streaming (TopHit)	67
UK Rock & Metal (Official Charts)	32
UK Singles Downloads (Official Charts)	58
UK Singles Sales (OCC)	61
US Digital Song Sales (Billboard)	24
US Hot Rock & Alternative Songs (Billboard)	26

=== Year-end charts ===
Year-end chart performance for "God Is a Weapon"
Chart (2025)	Position
Russia Streaming (TopHit)	148
US Hot Rock & Alternative Songs (Billboard)	61
