= Dying Is Your Latest Fashion =

Studio album by Escape the Fate
- Released: September 26, 2006
- Studios: Studio Barbarosa in Bavon, Virginia
- Genres: Post-hardcore; emo
- Length: 43:25
- Label: Epitaph
- Producers: Ryan Bake, Michael Baskette

Escape the Fate chronology
There's No Sympathy for the Dead (2006)	Dying Is Your Latest Fashion (2006)	This War Is Ours (2008)

Singles from Dying Is Your Latest Fashion
- 1. "There's No Sympathy for the Dead" Released: June 27, 2006; 2. "Not Good Enough for Truth in Cliché" Released: September 26, 2006; 3. "Situations" Released: November 20, 2007

Professional ratings
Review scores
Source	Rating
AbsolutePunk	50%
AllMusic	3/5 stars

Dying Is Your Latest Fashion is the first full-length album by the American rock band Escape the Fate, released on September 26, 2006, through Epitaph Records. It contains nine new songs and two songs taken from the preceding EP There's No Sympathy for the Dead. "Not Good Enough for Truth in Cliché" and "Situations" were released as singles, with music videos being made for both. This is the band’s only album to feature their original lead vocalist Ronnie Radke, who was fired from the band in 2008 after being arrested for parole violations.

== Music and lyrics ==
The album's styles have been described as post-hardcore and emo, drawing comparisons to the Used, My Chemical Romance and From First to Last. The track "The Guillotine" incorporates vocals that switch off between screaming and clean vocals. The song also incorporates shred guitar. The album's lyrical tones have been described as "love and loss through standard-issue blood-soaked imagery of guillotines, corpses, red lipstick, and darkness". Themes explored include addiction and self-destructive behavior.

== Promotion and release ==
Escape the Fate released the song "Not Good Enough for Truth in Cliché" as the first single and later released the song "Situations" as the second single on November 20, 2007, on iTunes, which included "Situations", its video, and the B-side "Makeup" which was previously only available on the Japanese version of Dying Is Your Latest Fashion.

"There's No Sympathy for the Dead" and "The Guillotine" were first released in the band's There's No Sympathy for the Dead EP.

"The Webs We Weave" was intended to be third single from the album, but was cancelled due to Ronnie Radke's departure.

"Reverse This Curse" was never released as a single but appeared in the soundtrack of Tony Hawk's Downhill Jam and on the Warped Tour 2007 Tour Compilation album.

Following the release of the album, Radke was put on probation for narcotics charges and later violated probation when he was involved in an altercation resulting in the death of 18-year-old Michael Cook. Radke plead guilty to battery charges and was sent to prison for two years, leading Escape the Fate to hire Craig Mabbitt as their temporary lead singer. Mabbit would later become the permanent lead singer and be featured in the band's subsequent studio albums.

In celebration of the album's 10th anniversary, Falling in Reverse played every song from the album during their tour "Ronnie Radke's Three Ring Circus" in 2015.

== Commercial performance ==
Dying Is Your Latest Fashion sold 4,100 copies in its first week, which according to Robert Ortiz was the fastest-selling album for a new artist on Epitaph. As of 2011, the album has sold 168,000 copies. The album was certified gold by the RIAA on July 29, 2025.

== Track listing ==
All tracks are written by Escape the Fate, except track 8 by Escape the Fate and Mike Booth.

No.	Title	Length
1.	"The Webs We Weave"	2:54
2.	"When I Go Out, I Want to Go Out on a Chariot of Fire"	4:01
3.	"Situations"	3:08
4.	"The Guillotine"	4:32
5.	"Reverse This Curse"	3:41
6.	"Cellar Door"	4:36
7.	"There's No Sympathy for the Dead"	5:25
8.	"My Apocalypse"	4:43
9.	"Friends and Alibis"	4:10
10.	"Not Good Enough for Truth in Cliché"	3:50
11.	"The Day I Left the Womb"	2:25
Total length:		43:25

Japanese bonus track
No.	Title	Length
12.	"Make Up" (titled "Look Your Best")	3:28

== Personnel ==
Dying Is Your Latest Fashion album personnel as listed on AllMusic.

Escape the Fate

- Ronnie Radke – lead vocals
- Max Green – bass
- Monte Money – guitar
- Omar Espinosa – guitar
- Robert Ortiz – drums

Production

- Ryan Baker – producer
- Michael Baskette – producer, mixing, audio production
- Marlene Guidara – photography
- Dave Holdredge – engineer, mixing
- Jef Moll – digital editing
- Nick Pritchard – art direction, design
- Amanda Wieme – artwork model

Additional musicians

- Michael Baskette – keyboards
- Karen Schielke – programming
- Jeff Moll – programming
- Dave Holdredge – cello

== Chart positions ==
Chart performance for Dying Is Your Latest Fashion (2006)
Chart (2006)	Peak position
US Heatseekers Albums (Billboard)	12
US Independent Albums (Billboard)	19

Chart performance for Dying Is Your Latest Fashion (2022)
Chart (2022)	Peak position
Australian Albums (ARIA)	99

== Certifications ==
Region	Certification	Certified units/sales
United States (RIAA)	Gold	500,000^{‡}
^{‡} Sales+streaming figures based on certification alone.

== Usage in media ==
"Reverse This Curse" is included in the soundtrack of Tony Hawk's Downhill Jam.
