= There's No Sympathy for the Dead =

Extended play by Escape the Fate

EP by Escape the Fate
- Released: May 23, 2006
- Recorded: Studio Barbarosa in Bavon, Virginia
- Genres: Emo, screamo, metalcore
- Length: 20:50
- Label: Epitaph
- Producer: Michael Baskette

Escape the Fate chronology
Escape the Fate (2005)	There's No Sympathy for the Dead (2006)	Dying Is Your Latest Fashion (2006)

Singles from There's No Sympathy for the Dead
- 1. "There's No Sympathy for the Dead" Released: June 27, 2006

Professional ratings
Review scores
Source	Rating
AllMusic	2.5/5 stars
CD Universe	4.7/5 stars
Punknews.org	2/5 stars
Ultimate Guitar	8.8/10 stars

There's No Sympathy for the Dead is the debut EP by American rock band Escape the Fate, released in 2006. It is the band's debut release after signing with Epitaph Records. Two songs from the EP titled "There's No Sympathy for the Dead" and "The Guillotine" would later be featured in the band's debut studio album Dying Is Your Latest Fashion.

== Musical style ==
The EP's styles have been described as screamo, emo and melodic metalcore. Matt Whelihan of Punknews.org described the sound as "metal-influenced screamo" and compared the album's guitarwork to Avenged Sevenfold, while likening the album's hooks to the "arena-screamo" of Hawthorne Heights and Underoath. He also described Escape the Fate as "Atreyu with a Drive-Thru Records singer".

== Track listing ==
All tracks are written by Escape the Fate.

No.	Title	Length
1.	"Dragging Dead Bodies in Blue Bags Up Really Long Hills"	3:38
2.	"There's No Sympathy for the Dead"	5:26
3.	"The Ransom"	3:50
4.	"As You're Falling Down"	3:24
5.	"The Guillotine"	4:32
Total length:		20:50

== Personnel ==
Escape the Fate

- Ronnie Radke – lead vocals
- Bryan "Monte" Money – lead guitar, backing vocals
- Omar Espinosa – rhythm guitar, backing vocals
- Max Green – bass, backing vocals
- Robert Ortiz – drums
- Carson Allen – keyboards, backing vocals

Additional musicians

- Karen Schielke – programming
- Jeff Moll – programming
- Dave Holdredge – cello

Production

- Michael "Elvis" Baskette – production, mixing
- Josh Whelan – production
- Lynn Lauer – engineering, mixing
- Karen Schielke – engineering

== Usage in media ==
"As You're Falling Down" is in the soundtrack of Arena Football: Road to Glory.
