= Monte Money =

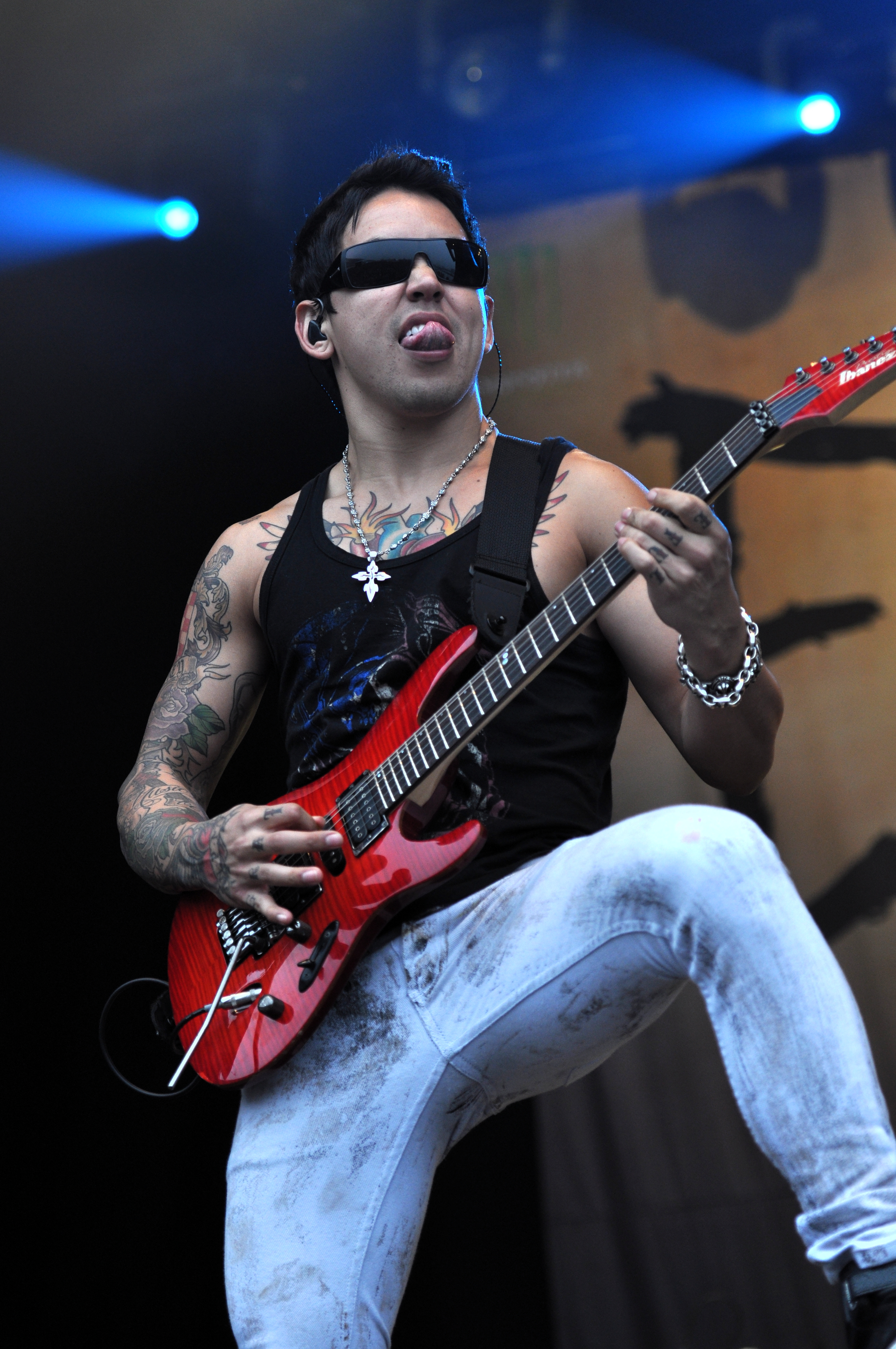
- Monte Money in 2013

Background information
- Born: Bryan Money Jr. October 27, 1986 (age 40); Las Vegas, Nevada, U.S.
- Genres: Alternative rock; hard rock; post-hardcore; metalcore; heavy metal
- Occupations: Musician, singer, songwriter
- Instruments: Vocals, guitar, bass guitar, drums, keyboards, synthesizer
- Years active: 2004–present
- Member of: Beyond Unbroken
- Formerly of: Escape the Fate
- Children: 1

Bryan Monte Money (born October 27, 1986) is an American guitarist and vocalist from Las Vegas, Nevada. He is the former lead guitarist, backing vocalist, and co-founding member of American rock band Escape the Fate, and is the current lead singer and guitarist for Beyond Unbroken.

== Career ==
=== Escape the Fate (2004–2013) ===
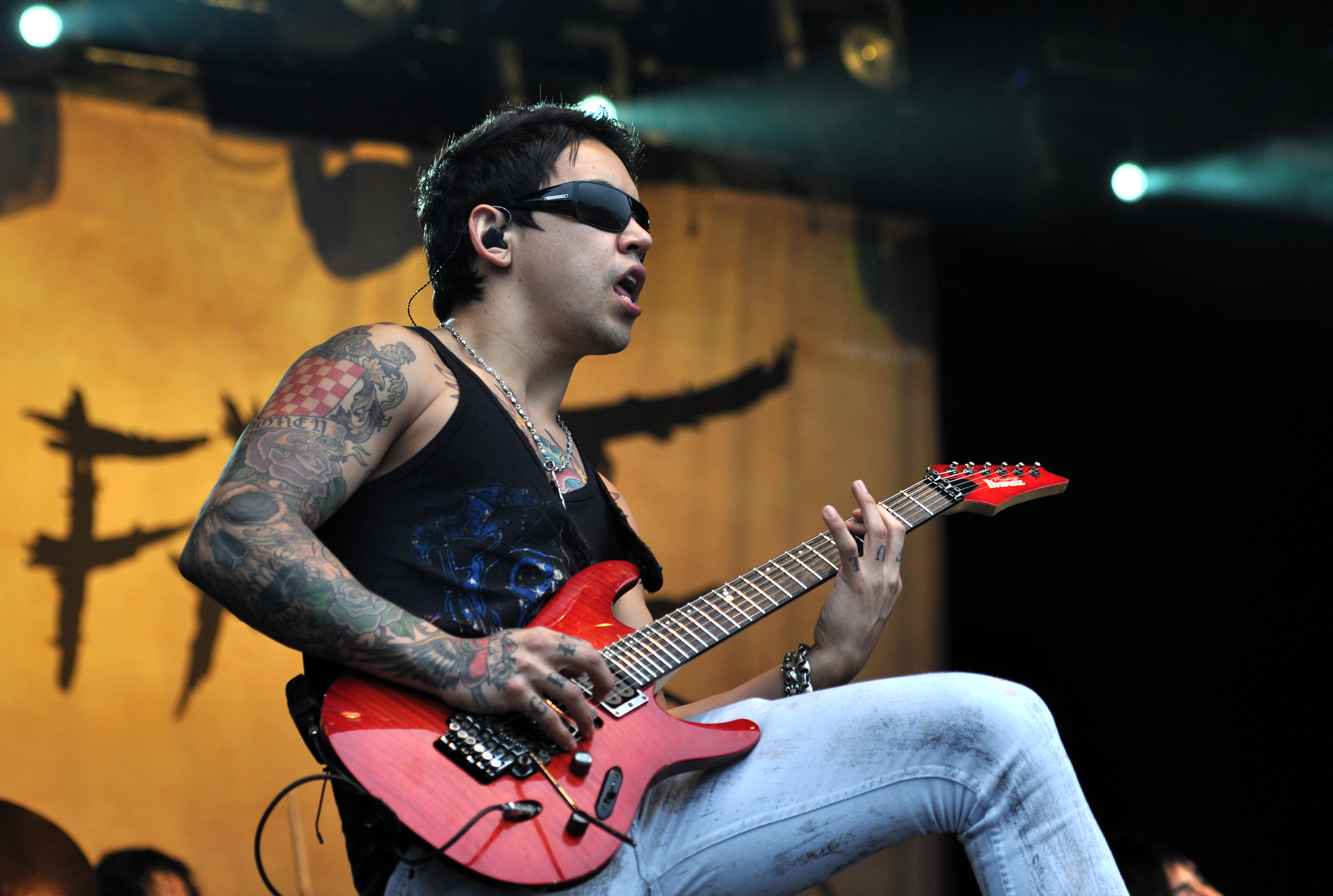
Monte Money live at Rock Am Ring in, 2013

Monte Money was the lead guitarist and co-founding member of Escape the Fate. Money released four albums with the band from the formation of the band, until his departure.

On September 16, 2013, Escape the Fate issued a statement from their Facebook page stating that Monte and his brother (Michael Money) had refused to go on the "Wrong Side of Heaven" tour with Five Finger Death Punch, and that they would be replacing them for the tour. Monte and Michael's departure prompted further lineup changes in the band with TJ Bell moving from bass to rhythm guitar, and former bassist and founding member Max Green would be return to the band for the tour. It was later announced in an Alternative Press video featuring lead singer Craig Mabbitt that Max Green would be returning to bass permanently, and Kevin Gruft would become the new lead guitarist.

Monte later issued a statement, "Over the past few weeks, I have become aware of the mis-truths being told by Craig Mabbitt over Twitter, Facebook, and various entertainment sites about my role with Escape the Fate. As ETF fans know, I spent many years of my life completely devoted to the band, and never worked harder at anything to achieve its success." He later mentioned the band's advisors have said that Escape the Fate is bankrupt.

=== Beyond Unbroken (2013–present) ===
After departing from Escape the Fate, Monte and his brother Michael started a solo project called Money Brothers. Monte stated that, "After a great decade in the band and working with the guys, I just felt like I wanted to start a new journey and explore a new musical path. I will always love what we've created and all of the crazy fun times the guys and I had". Their first single titled "Break Free" was released in October 2013 and their second single titled "Clarity (Behind the Curtain)" was released in February 2014.

Monte revealed a name change from the solo project Money Brothers to a new band called Beyond Unbroken.

On October 30, 2015, their new single titled "Under Your Skin" was released.

On February 22, 2016, the single "Don't Wake the Dead" was released. On March 30, 2016, the band released their first music video for the single "Losing My Mind" debuting on Alternative Press.

On August 29, 2017, over a year after the release of "Losing My Mind", the band released a new single entitled "Overdose", accompanied by an animated video. On September 1, 2017, the band's debut EP "Don't Wake the Dead" was released.

On February 7, 2020, the band released two singles titled "Enemy" and "In My Head". On April 3, 2020, the band's debut album "Running Out of Time" was released.

== Gear ==
- Ibanez S5470F Prestige (seen in Picture Perfect, You're Insane, and This War Is Ours music videos)
- Gibson Les Paul Standard (black, stock pickups) (seen in Not Good Enough For Cliche, The Flood, and Something music videos)
- Gibson Les Paul Custom (black, stock pickups) (Used by his brother, Michael Money, in Ungrateful music video)
- Dean Razorback V (Black) (seen in Situations music video)
- Ibanez Prestige RGD seven string (drop A) (Floyd Rose) (seen in Ungrateful, City of Sin, and Issues music videos)
- Peavey Wolfgang
- Ibanez Halberd (black with Ibanez Edge bridge) (seen in Gorgeous Nightmare)

== Discography ==
Solo

- "Break Free (Remastered)" (Single, 2026)
- "Sharp of the Blade" (Single, 2026)
- "Let Me Be the Enemy" (Single, 2026)
- "They're All Dead" (Single, 2026)
- "Ride Till I Die" (Single, 2026)

with Escape the Fate

- Escape the Fate (EP) (2005)
- There's No Sympathy for the Dead (EP) (2006)
- Dying Is Your Latest Fashion (2006)
- Situations (EP) (2007)
- This War Is Ours (2008)
- Escape the Fate (2010)
- Ungrateful (2013)

with Money Brothers

- "Break Free" (Single, 2013)
- "Clarity (Behind the Curtain)" (Single, 2014)

with Beyond Unbroken

- Don't Wake the Dead (EP) (2017)
- Running Out of Time (2020)
- Destruction (2024)

Collaborations

- "On Top of the World" by The Dead Rabbitts (Edge of Reality (EP), 2012)
- "Offline" and "Lost in Space" by Paul Bartolome (Gravity, 2018)
- "Devils In the Details" by Paul Bartolome (Screaming Through the Radio, 2020)
- "Break the Cycle" by Andromida (Lost Voice (EP), 2023)
