= Escape the Fate =

American rock band

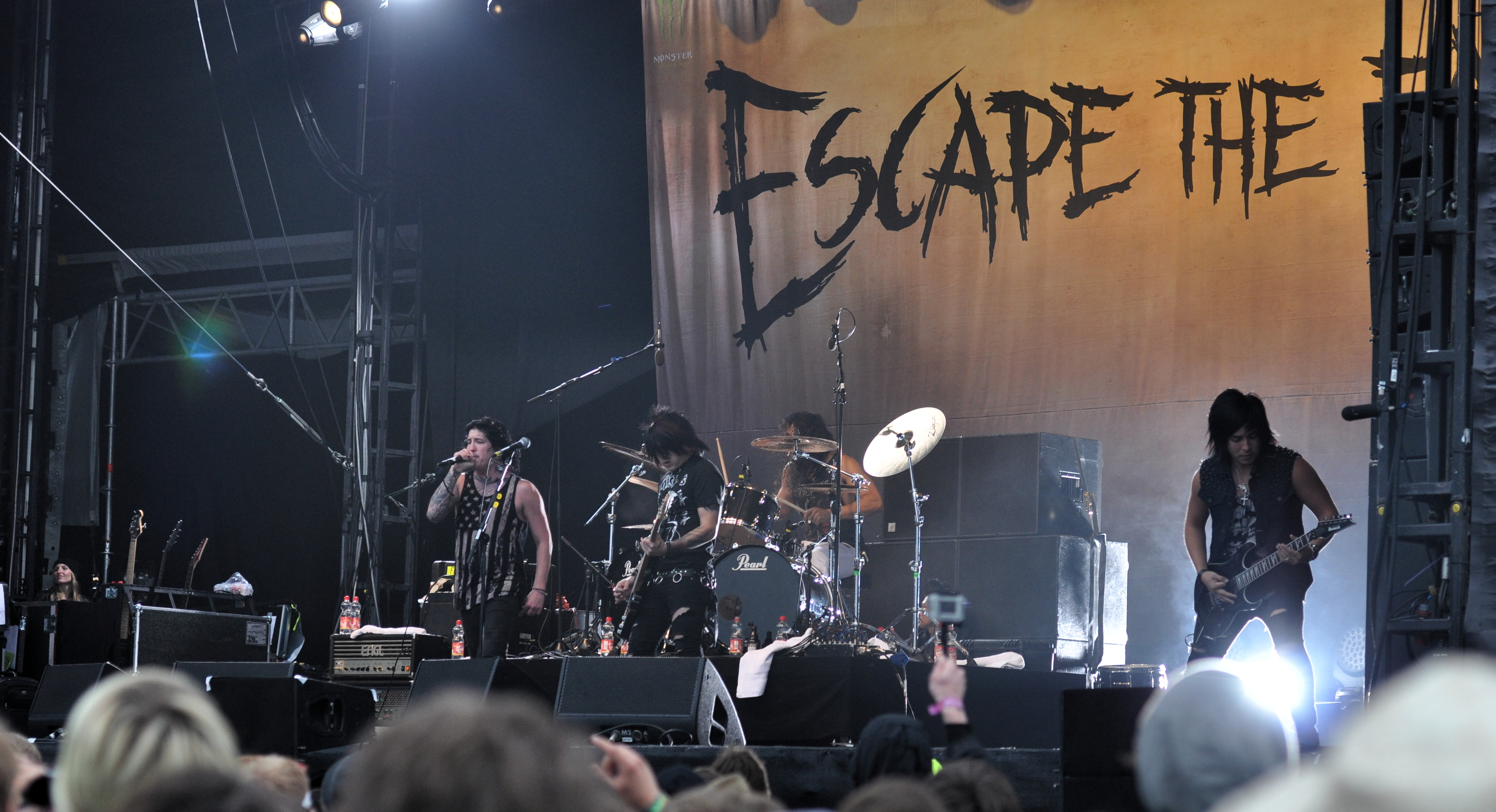
- Escape the Fate performing at Rock am Ring 2013

Background information
- Origin: Las Vegas, Nevada, U.S.
- Genres: Post-hardcore; metalcore; screamo; emo
- Works: Escape the Fate discography
- Years active: 2004–present
- Labels: Big Noise; Eleven Seven; Universal; DGC; Interscope; Polydor; Epitaph
- Spinoffs: LoveHateHero; Falling in Reverse; Dead Rabbitts; Beyond Unbroken
- Members: Robert Ortiz; Craig Mabbitt; Erik Jensen; Matti Hoffman
- Past members: Carson Allen; Omar Espinosa; Ronnie Radke; Monte Money; Michael Money; Max Green; Kevin "Thrasher" Gruft; Thomas "TJ" Bell
- Website: escapethefate.com
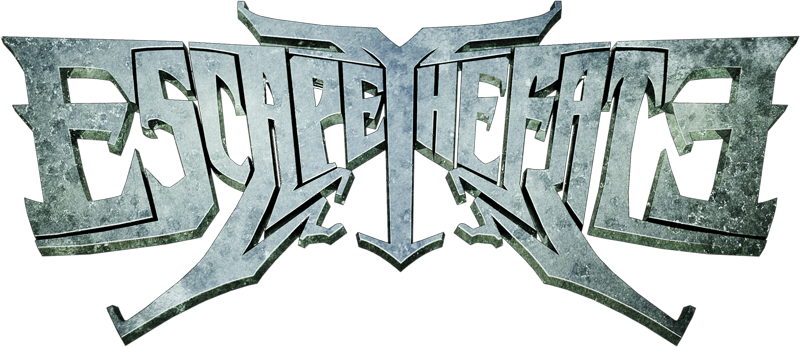

Escape the Fate is an American rock band from Las Vegas formed in 2004. Originally from Pahrump, Nevada, the group currently consists of drummer Robert Ortiz, lead vocalist Craig Mabbitt, and guitarists Matti Hoffman, Erik Jensen. Ortiz is the only founding member remaining in the band.

The band released their debut album Dying Is Your Latest Fashion in 2006, fronted by founding lead singer Ronnie Radke. After Radke was sentenced to prison for his involvement in a 2006 killing, he was fired and replaced with Craig Mabbitt formerly of the band Blessthefall. Escape the Fate's second album This War Is Ours, their first with Mabbitt, was released in 2008 and debuted at No. 35 on the Billboard 200, selling 13,000 copies in the first week.

Their third album, Escape the Fate, came out in 2010 and reached No. 25 on the Billboard 200, their highest placement. In 2013, their fourth album Ungrateful was released, including "One for the Money", their highest-charting song on the U.S. Mainstream Rock charts.

Signed to John Feldmann's Big Noise label, the band's seventh album Chemical Warfare was released in 2021, and their eighth and most recent album Out of the Shadows was released in 2023.

== History ==
=== Debut album and departure of vocalist Ronnie Radke (2004–2007) ===
Before forming Escape the Fate, founding vocalist Ronnie Radke, lead guitarist Bryan Monte Money, bassist Max Green, drummer Robert Ortiz, and rhythm guitarist Omar Espinosa were in multiple bands all together. Later, in 2004, Monte Money created Escape the Fate with Max Green and Ronnie Radke, then inviting Robert Ortiz, Omar Espinosa and Carson Allen.

In September 2005, Escape the Fate won a local radio contest judged by My Chemical Romance. The gig awarded them the opportunity to open a show on the band's headlining tour with Alkaline Trio and Reggie and the Full Effect. As a result of their show on the tour and their self-released EP demo, this subsequently led to Escape the Fate's record deal with Epitaph. Following their record deal, the band released their debut EP titled There's No Sympathy for the Dead in May 2006, which included two songs that were later on their full-length album. The EP was produced by Michael Baskette and helped earn the band attention from record labels and fans alike.

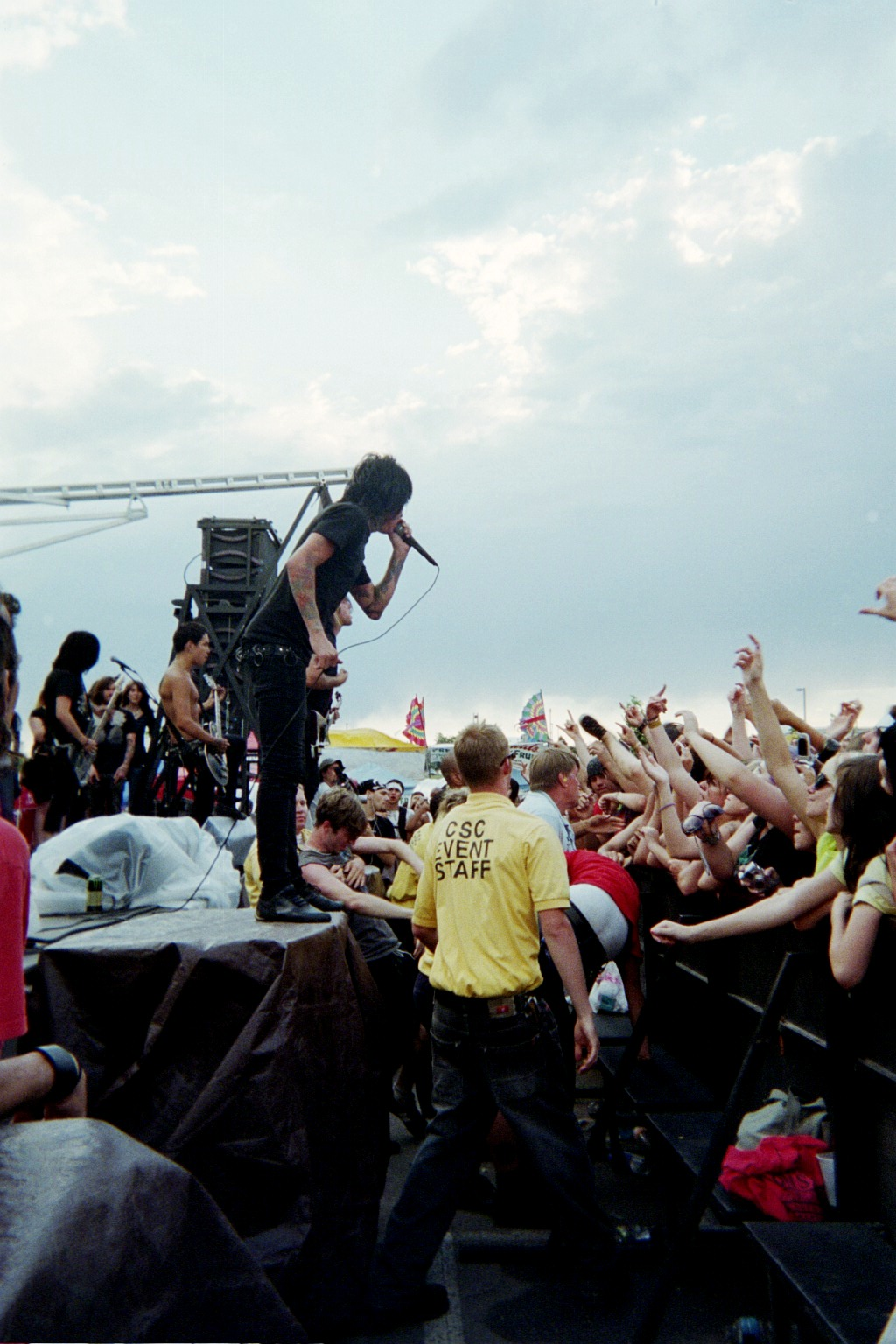
Ronnie Radke performing live with the band in 2007

Later in September 2006, the band released their first full-length album, Dying Is Your Latest Fashion, which charted moderately on Billboard's Heatseeker and Top Independent charts. On November 20, 2007, they released the Situations EP, it was also the last extended play that Ronnie Radke and Omar Espinosa made with the band.

On November 6, 2007, rhythm guitarist Omar Espinosa left the band due to personal issues and started a band called Perfect Like Me (after leaving The Black and White City). Later, Ronnie Radke was involved in an altercation in Las Vegas that resulted in the fatal shooting of 18-year-old Michael Cook. While Radke did not shoot Cook, he was indicted on battery charges, while the man who shot Cook claimed self-defense. These charges against Radke, combined with Ronnie's past troubles with narcotics and rehab, led to a sentence of five years probation. Radke failed to report to his probation officer and was arrested in June 2008, where he was sentenced to two years in prison. Radke was officially fired from Escape the Fate in mid-2008.

=== Arrival of Craig Mabbitt (2008–2010) ===
The band turned to Craig Mabbitt, who was searching for a new band after leaving Blessthefall. Mabbitt had played with Escape the Fate on the Black on Black Tour, while with Blessthefall. After several trial shows he became the official new singer and they entered the studio to record their second full-length album, This War Is Ours. The album was released on October 21, 2008. It was the first Escape the Fate release to feature Craig Mabbitt as the lead vocalist. On October 1, 2008, the band released "This War Is Ours (The Guillotine II)" for download. Copies of the album were made available to buy on their tour with Chiodos and Silverstein, even before the album's official release date. The official video for "Something" was released to MTV on January 12, 2009. The video for the album's third single "10 Miles Wide" was released June 9, 2009. "This War Is Ours (The Guillotine II)" is the fourth single off the album. The video was shot in Santa Ana, California on January 9, 2010. The video was released along with the deluxe edition of the album on April 27, 2010.

The album debuted at No. 35 on the Billboard 200, selling 13,000 copies in the first week. Before the tour for This War Is Ours, the band had never completed a full tour. The band later went on the This War Is Ours tour with Attack Attack!, Burn Halo, William Control, and Black Tide. The band then joined Hollywood Undead and Atreyu on their 2008 tour and toured Europe during December.

In 2010, Epitaph Records announced the re-release of the This War Is Ours album in deluxe CD/DVD edition with a bonus disc with many different features not seen before. The CD included two new never before heard songs, later identified to be "Bad Blood" and "Behind the Mask", an acoustic version of "Harder Than You Know", and an unreleased remix of "This War Is Ours (The Guillotine II)" called "This War Is Mine", remixed by the Shawn Crahan. It also came with a DVD that featured the new music video to "This War Is Ours (The Guillotine II)", as well as "Something", "The Flood", and "10 Miles Wide", as well as a world tour documentary and a behind the music feature. It released April 27, 2010.

Escape the Fate spent the rest of 2010 touring Australia on the Soundwave Festival and then Extreme Thing in the US.

=== Self-titled album, and departure of Max Green (2010–2012) ===
Escape the Fate began writing a third record in early 2010, which eventually became Escape the Fate, which was released in November 2010. For the album, the band left Epitaph and signed to major label Interscope and had the record produced by Don Gilmore. Max Green commented on the album, saying, "This record is the cure for the modern day music epidemic, We are wiping the slate clean and re-writing rock music as you know it." The album spawned four singles: "Massacre", "Issues", "City of Sin", and "Gorgeous Nightmare".

The band had been working on the album since the release of This War Is Ours in 2008. Being able to completely form the writing and recording process with the current lineup for the first time, the band felt that the album would be a great representation for the band. This is due to the fact that when Mabbitt first joined the band, he felt very rushed to write a record and fit into an already established band. In addition, the debut on a major label also led to the band choosing to self-title the album. Lyrically, the album is heavier and darker than previous efforts, according to Mabbitt. In an interview, he explained the choice of direction for the album in that they were, "figuring out what we enjoy playing live, what we enjoy listening to on our record". Mabbitt feels that the past two albums have been working up to Escape the Fate and that this direction will continue with future releases. For writing, Craig Mabbitt expressed that he believes it is more important to focus on what the band enjoys doing rather than copying other bands for success. "[We] definitely could have been like, 'Oh, let's throw another minute-long solo, let's do a chugga-chug here, let's scream over this, and let's sound like every other band and put the same song on the record ten times so that we have a one song, ten different track album.'... we just like to be very diverse..." On working with producer Don Gilmore, the band said that he helped them "find themselves" and continue to push different parts of the song until they formed a record they were satisfied with. Mabbitt also praised Gilmore for his ability to perfect the album without affecting their music. Commenting on the album, Mabbitt feels that "This record has the heaviest song the band has ever written, it has the softest ballad the band has ever written, it has the craziest solo Monte has ever written. The whole record just has everything in it."

For inspiration, Craig Mabbitt said that he drew experiences from many things, stating, "I wanted to write about every emotion that you can get from life, everything that kind of happens, every kind of story I've heard that really upset me." The track "Lost in Darkness" tells the story about one of Mabbitt's friends who was dragged out of her home and raped at gunpoint. Mabbitt stated that, "[She] was screaming for help and nobody helped her at all. Everybody just turned the other cheek. That was something that really struck me, and I see that happening a lot, just people not wanting to lend a helping hand to people when somebody is hurting... That's definitely where I went with that song." The second track, "Massacre", is about Mabbitt's past addictions and the things he did to overcome them. The ballad track "World Around Me" takes a broader view and was written about life in general. "[World Around Me is] about relationships with my ex and my child, everything accumulated into one song." The closing track, "The Aftermath (G3)", is the third song under the title of "The Guillotine" for Escape the Fate. The original Guillotine was sung by Ronnie Radke for Dying Is Your Latest Fashion and was about the video game series Halo. When Mabbitt joined, a song entitled "This War Is Ours (The Guillotine Part II)" was included on This War Is Ours and was also about Halo. However, the second Guillotine was written as well to relate to real-life soldiers in battle. For the self-titled album, Mabbitt wrote a third Guillotine track but did not want to base it off of Halo again. Instead, he wrote a more personal track about his father who was in the military when Mabbitt was a child. "[The] chorus, 'Now I'm coming home,' is an ode to my Dad and an ode to all the soldiers out there who are fighting a war for us and waiting to come home to their families." As a whole, Mabbitt feels that, "every track has a completely different underlying story to it".

Vocally, Mabbitt experimented for the self-titled album. On both tracks "Lost in Darkness" and "Liars and Monsters", a track that appears on the Deluxe Edition of the album, he sang at the lowest pitch he has done yet for a track. On the track "Zombie Dance", Mabbitt described the recording process and that he recorded five layers of vocal harmony for the final mix in addition to little sound effects. He explained it was difficult to achieve the high harmonies and right pitches right for all of the tracks. Another difficulty he experienced while recording was boosting the endings of songs for an epic feels. Despite this, Craig stated he enjoyed experimenting and that he "can't wait to keep on going back into the studio and experimenting on a ton of different things."

Rather than have eleven tracks for the regular version of the album, the band wanted to include both "Liars and Monsters" and "The Final Blow" from the deluxe edition on the album. The decision to put them as bonus tracks were encouraged to keep the length and tracks on the album to a manageable size. Mabbitt jokingly stated that the band recorded so much material, almost two albums worth, that he "just want[ed] to record everything and just release a 20 track album." There were at least six or seven tracks recorded that did not make the cut for the album. Two ballads and about five heavier songs were cut because the band had to decide "Which one is the strongest one? Which one do we have most vocals to? What's going to fit in the diversity of the record?" This was to give the fans variety rather than having a straight, one-genre record. On this, Mabbitt commented, "We could have thrown those songs on there and not put "World Around Me" or "Gorgeous Nightmare" or "Zombie Dance" or "Issues" or anything like that. It would have been more like a straightforward record. That's not what we like to do. We like to have a lot of that diversity in our sound." Another track, entitled "Dream" was fully recorded and mixed for the final cut of the album. Before finalizing, however, Monte Money decided to rerecord the guitar part with a lower tune to change the sound of the song. After rerecording, the band agreed they liked the original version better but the deadline for the record did not allow them to finish the song in time so they are going to keep it for a later release.

In an interview during Warped Tour 2009, bassist Max Green stated that the album will feature a song co-written by Mick Mars of Mötley Crüe, who approached Escape the Fate to collaborate on some songs, but later was revealed that they decided against putting the song on the album and saving for a future release. Max Green also confirmed through Formspring that there will be a song co-written by guitarist John 5 of Rob Zombie, later seen to be "Liars And Monsters".

On April 23, vocalist Craig Mabbitt stated via Twitter, "off to vegas today to finish out last minute badass demos with monte, then off to bamboozle, then studio time", giving the notion that the band will begin recording their studio album directly after The Bamboozle, and release it mid/late Summer 2010. Soon after, Mabbitt stated through his Twitter account that the band had a few more songs to record, and that the new album will be coming sooner than expected. He has also hinted towards there being a "Guillotine III: The Aftermath" track on the album, which was later confirmed as true.

During early recording, Max Green was questioned on Formspring about the band possibly changing record labels. Max responded by saying that he will reveal all of that at a later time. This would make the record the first to be released without Epitaph Records. On July 26, Escape The Fate confirmed that the new record will be released through major record label, DGC/Interscope Records. Craig Mabbitt stated that the band had no issues with Epitaph but the appeal to bring their music to a wider audience led to their signing with Interscope. The band was initially worried about switching but were pleased that neither the new label or the new producer wanted to change or control the band. "Interscope was hopping on board with us, instead of us hopping on board with Interscope." In the same press release, they have listed Don Gilmore as the album's producer, who has worked with bands such as Linkin Park, Bullet for My Valentine, and Hollywood Undead. A November 2 release date was also confirmed. Speaking about the album, Max Green commented, "This record is the cure for the modern day music epidemic, We are wiping the slate clean and re-writing rock music as you know it."

Starting July 24, 2010, they set off on tour for South and Central America, the country's toured are Brazil, Argentina, Colombia, Chile, Colombia and Venezuela. Escape the Fate were set to take on a United States, Canada, and Europe tour prior to release of the album, with Bullet for My Valentine, Drive A and Black Tide, but later forfeited their spot due to Max Green admitting to rehab.

In May, Escape the Fate joined the second half of the Raid The Nation tour headlined by Papa Roach with the absence of Max Green on bass. With no statement by the band on his replacement, it was later recognized by many as TJ Bell, who was at the time the current rhythm guitarist for the band Motionless in White. In later interviews with the band after Green's departure, it was clear his absence from the tour was due to his addiction with drugs. Bell would go on to fill in for Green on many subsequent tours before replacing Green permanently in 2012.

On January 11, 2011, the band performed live in "Tues Show" (Fuel.tv) the songs "Issues" and "Gorgeous Nightmare" with the special collaboration of Thrasher (of Lovehatehero). On August 19, 2011, the band announced via Facebook that Monte Money would be taking a break from touring but will still be in the band. Thrasher, who had worked with the band in the past, substituted for Monte. It was also announced that Max Green returned to the band after taking a break through the first half of 2011 to recover from his addiction to drugs through rehab. "I'm feeling great and am glad to be back with my band. Escape The Fate is my life. This is where I belong," he said. After they played a couple of shows on the 2011 Uproar Festival, Green, again, left the band and Zakk Sandler, from Black Tide (who was also playing Uproar), filled in for him. TJ Bell, currently bass guitarist of Get Scared once again filled in for Green in early 2012 on the band's UK tour with Funeral for a Friend, who had previously filled in for Green on their tour with Papa Roach.

In mid-December 2011, the band re-entered the studio to work on the production of their fourth album. Initially, the album was planned to be produced in full by John Feldmann and was scheduled for release some time in 2012.

Mabbitt commented that since they are recording their fourth album with John Feldmann again, who they worked with on their second album, This War Is Ours, the style of the upcoming album would be similar to This War Is Ours but would also have elements of their Escape the Fate album added. He also announced a tour, later revealed to be the This World is Ours Tour in South America with the metalcore band Attack Attack! as well as supporting acts The Word Alive and Mest. The tour would later be continued in the United States and Canada. He revealed on February 7 that Escape the Fate was working with Fall Out Boy's lead singer Patrick Stump. It was later revealed that they had made the song "Painting" together, which would be on the upcoming Escape the Fate album and actually titled "Picture Perfect".

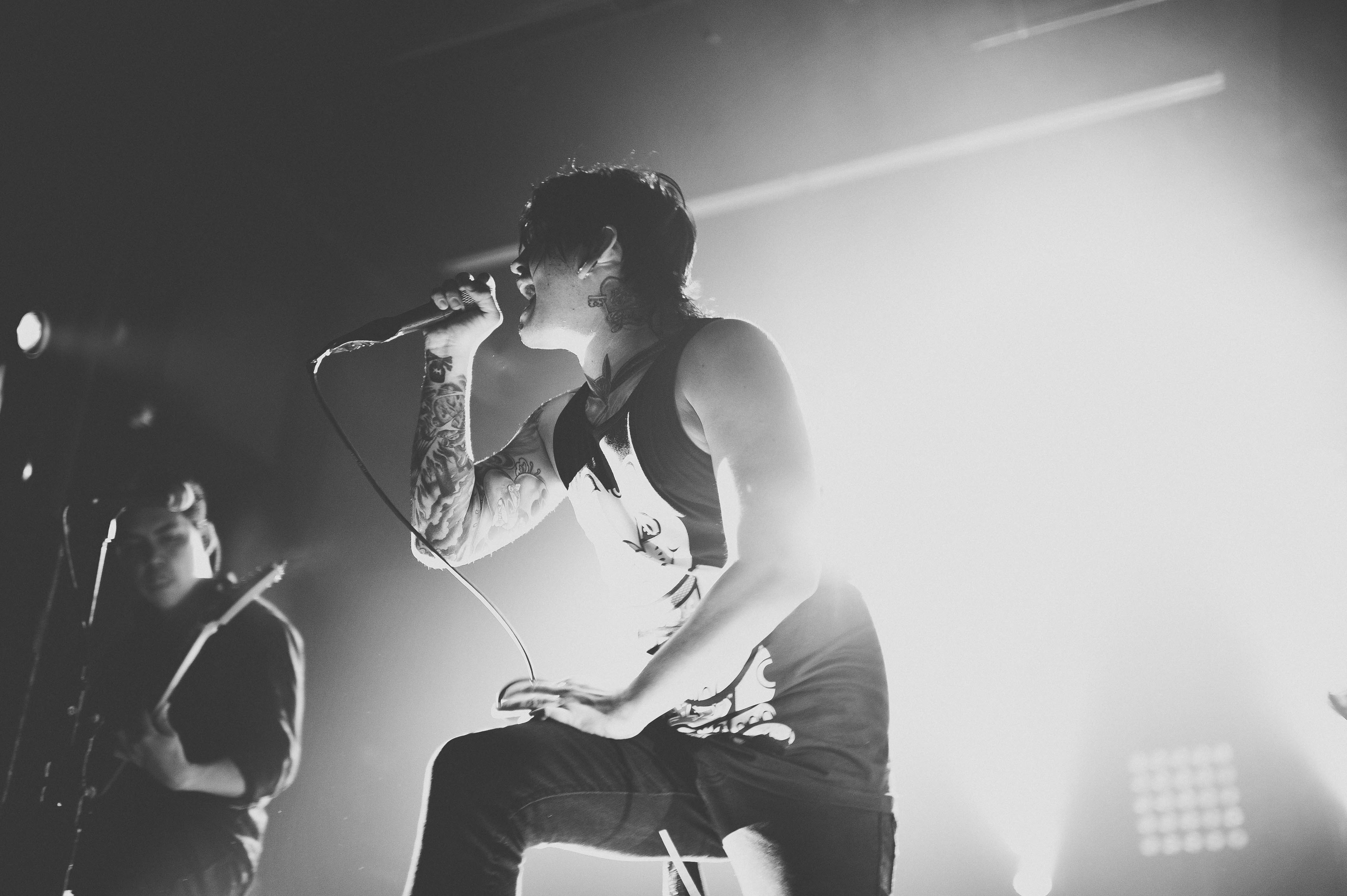
Escape The Fate live in 2012

On March 4, 2012, Green stated on his Twitter account that he was no longer playing in Escape the Fate. He did not give any specific reasons for his departure, but summarized that it was mainly due to personal and musical differences. He later announced that although he was no longer part of the band, he was still continuing to make music. Mabbitt hinted in an interview with Alternative Press that Max Green's departure was due to drugs. Despite the sudden departure, Green and Escape the Fate remained on good terms, to the point where Green even attended a recent show by the band in Los Angeles. Green joined the band The Natural Born Killers and released their first song "Last Day".

The band announced that their South American tour with Attack Attack! would be delayed until June because of Attack Attack! member Andrew Wetzel being diagnosed with pneumonia.

In the aforementioned interview with Alternative Press, the band officially announced that touring members TJ Bell and Michael Money would join the band as official members. Mabbitt commented that Money would have already been an official member, but certain (and now former) members of the band refused to let him in. "When the band became a four-piece we still wanted rhythm so he was never officially given a spot in the band [because] some other members that aren't in the band anymore didn't want him to be," he said. "It got to the point where we were on a tour and he was playing behind the stage, then we got to Warped Tour and he was restricted to this little box and I'm sure it had some effect on Monte as well, [his brother] being in a band but not being an official part of it, so to see them happy and see that camaraderie, it's nice. We'll be stronger moving forward." Along with this, the band also revealed a possible September 2012 release date for their fourth studio album, and the band would be playing a new track from the album on the This World Is Ours tour, later to be revealed as "Live Fast, Die Beautiful".

=== Recent works (2013–2022) ===
Robert Ortiz announced in an interview that the band was in the process of switching record labels, explaining that Interscope had too much creative control over the band and the band was unhappy with it. On December 17, 2012, the band released a short clip of an upcoming track titled "Ungrateful", along with the official statement regarding joining Eleven Seven Music. Mabbitt commented on joining the label, "We are excited to be working with Allen and all the people at Eleven Seven Music and having Monster partner with us in 2013! We are stoked to get shit rolling again and we are thankful for all our fans that have stuck with us during this down time. We hope everyone is ready to go hard with us in 2013." Eleven Seven Music EVP Joe McFadden added, "We are extremely excited to have signed ESCAPE THE FATE. We've been watching them for some time now and we look forward to working with them as they define the future of rock and roll."

The band headlined a free show in Hollywood, California, on January 6, 2013, to continue promoting the album.

On March 18, the next single, "You're Insane", was also made available for those who pre-ordered the album, and on April 1 the music video was released as well.

On September 16, 2013, the band issued a statement from their Facebook page stating that Monte and his brother had refused to go on the Wrong Side of Heaven tour with Five Finger Death Punch, and that they would be replacing them for the tour. Along with this it was announced that TJ Bell would be moving from his position as bass guitarist to rhythm guitar and the former bass guitarist and original member Max Green would be returning to the band for the tour. It was later announced in an Alternative Press video with lead singer Craig Mabbitt that Green would be returning to bass guitar permanently, as would Kevin Gruft as the new lead guitarist.

On May 9, 2014, Green announced his second departure from the band, citing lack of fulfillment and passion as reasons. On May 12, 2014, it was announced that Green had joined the former lead singer Ronnie Radke's current band, Falling in Reverse, which he also left only months after joining.

The band announced that recording for their fifth studio album would begin on May 10, 2015. On August 15, 2015, info on the band's upcoming album leaked online before the official announcement which was originally supposed to be made on August 18. On August 18, 2015, the band released the first single from their new album titled "Just a Memory". The album will be called Hate Me was released on October 30, 2015.

In 2016, they covered the My Chemical Romance song, "Dead!", for a Rock Sound tribute album.

On November 3, 2017, the band released the first single, "Empire", from their new album, I Am Human, which was set to be released on February 16, 2018, but later postponed to March 30, 2018. The band's single "Broken Heart" from I Am Human was later released, and as of July 2018, had peaked at number 16 on the Billboard Mainstream Rock Songs chart.

On August 28, 2020, the band released "Walk On" as a single, and it is also included in the Sno Babies soundtrack. On October 16, 2020, the band released their second single "Invincible" featuring American violinist Lindsey Stirling. On October 23, 2020. the band released the single "Christmas Song". This song was included on Christmas With Better Noise Music, a Christmas compilation album by Better Noise Music. On January 8, 2021, the band released "Not My Problem" featuring Travis Barker as the third single to their seventh studio album, Chemical Warfare, which was released on April 16, 2021.

On April 21, 2021, the band announced they plan to release Chemical Warfare: B-Sides on June 12, 2021.

=== Out of the Shadows and departure of Gruft (2022–2026) ===
Shortly before a show in mid-September 2021, Kevin Gruft was absent from the band with Matti Hoffman taking his place as the lead guitarist. The band later removed Gruft from list of band members on their social media pages and added The Dead Rabbitts lead guitarist Erik Jensen as permanent bassist.

In December 2022 the band announced that they would be joining the lineup of the "Blue Ridge Rock Festival 2023". A new photo of the band was revealed without Gruft, and the band has yet to release an official statement regarding Kevin Gruft's departure.

On January 27, 2023, the band released their single titled "H8 My Self". Two months later, on March 31, 2023, another single called "Low" was released, followed by "Cheers to Goodbye" featuring Spencer Charnas from the band Ice Nine Kills on June 30.

Alongside a US tour, they shared their eighth studio album would be called Out of the Shadows and released September 1, 2023, their first album to be released under Big Noise Records. Their headlining tour in support of the record, entitled the Out of the Shadows Tour, took place between August 31 and October 7, with openers D.R.U.G.S, Point Up North, Stitched Up Heart, and Garzi. They are also slated to perform at the So What Fest in Dallas, Texas, on September 7, as well as Hellfest in France.

In February 2026, the band was announced as part of the lineup for the Louder Than Life music festival in Louisville, scheduled to take place in September.

=== The Last Goodbye (2026-present) ===
On October 2, 2026, Escape the Fate released The Last Goodbye. In an interview with Valentino Petrarca, vocalist Craig Mabbitt said the band wanted to take their time with this album, and have no featured guests.

== Musical style and influences ==
Their music has been described by critics as metalcore, post-hardcore, emo, and screamo. The band's influences include: Marilyn Manson, Guns N' Roses, Judas Priest, Megadeth, Iron Maiden, Mötley Crüe, A Static Lullaby, The Used, Cannibal Corpse, Danzig, Thursday, Avenged Sevenfold, Linkin Park, Korn, Eminem, Metallica, Blink-182, Journey, Buckcherry, My Chemical Romance, Underoath, System of a Down, DragonForce, Michael Jackson, Queen, Van Halen, Dio, Led Zeppelin and Aerosmith.

Craig Mabbitt has said that he draws inspiration from almost all genres. He said in an interview, "These days, a good song is a good song, and are always influences, whether it be old or new".

Ortiz stated that there is a great variety in the band's influences from classic metal bands such as Metallica and Iron Maiden to the newer bands that they have toured with, and also movie scores as well as Top 40 pop and rock songs.

== Band members ==
Current

- Robert Ortiz – drums, backing vocals (2004–present)
- Craig Mabbitt – lead vocals (2008–present)
- Erik Jensen – rhythm guitar, backing vocals (2025–present), bass, backing vocals (2021–2025; touring 2017–2021; studio only 2025–present)
- Matti Hoffman – lead guitar (2021–present)

== Discography ==
Studio albums

- Dying Is Your Latest Fashion (2006)
- This War Is Ours (2008)
- Escape the Fate (2010)
- Ungrateful (2013)
- Hate Me (2015)
- I Am Human (2018)
- Chemical Warfare (2021)
- Out of the Shadows (2023)
- The Last Goodbye (2026)
