= Ronnie Radke =

American musician (born 1983)

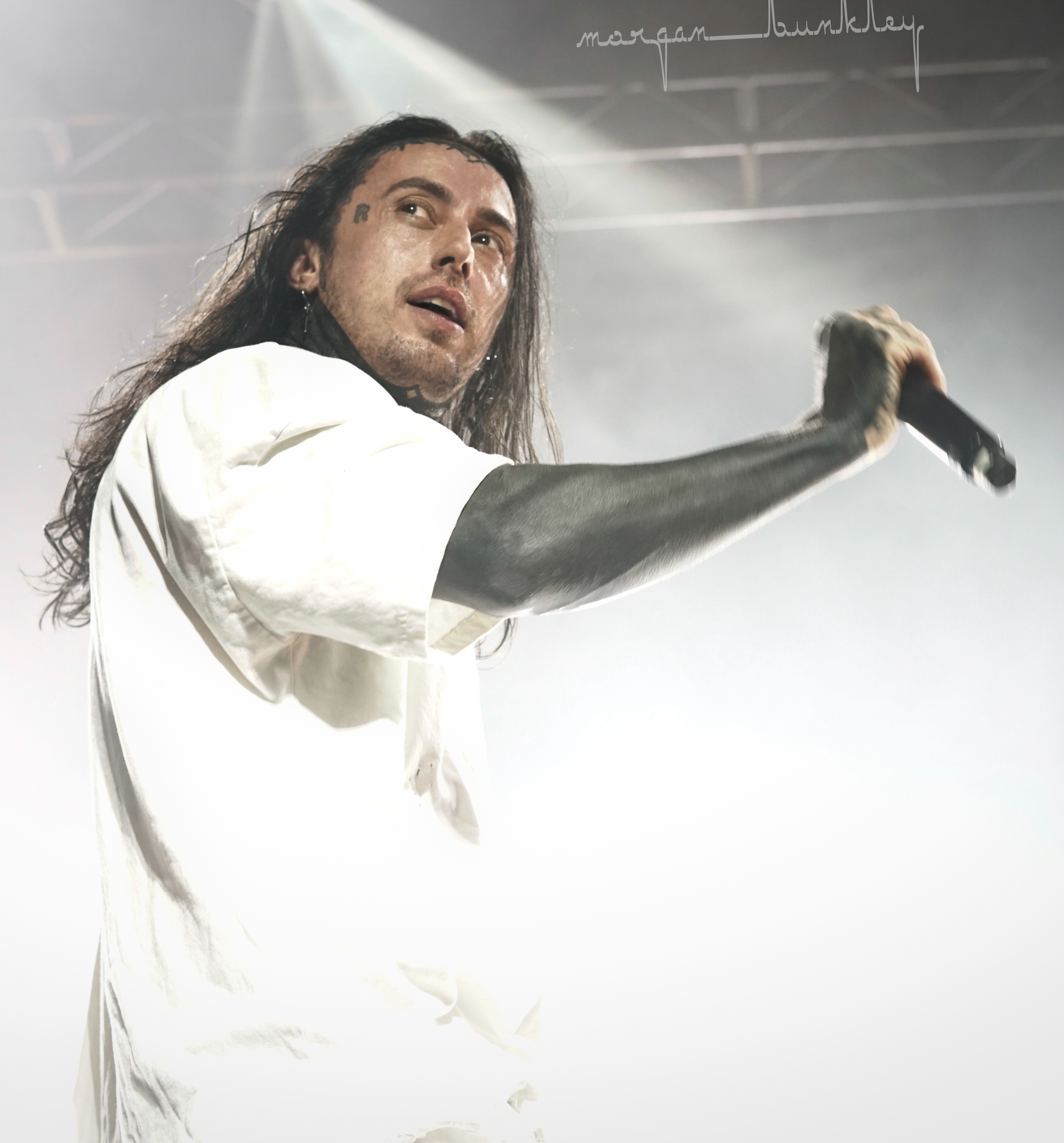
- Radke performing with Falling in Reverse during Rockzilla in 2022
- Born: Ronald Joseph Radke; December 15, 1983 (age 42); Las Vegas, Nevada, U.S.
- Occupations: Singer; musician; songwriter; rapper
- Years active: 1998–2008; 2010–present
- Partner: Saraya Bevis (2018–2024)
- Children: 1
- Musical career
- Genres: Post-hardcore; metalcore; pop-punk; rap metal; alternative metal; hard rock; electronicore; emo; hip-hop
- Instruments: Vocals; keyboards
- Member of: Falling in Reverse
- Formerly of: Escape the Fate
- Website: fallinginreverse.com

Ronald Joseph Radke (/ˈrædki/; born December 15, 1983) is an American singer, rapper, musician, and songwriter who is the frontman of rock band Falling in Reverse and former frontman of post-hardcore band Escape the Fate. He rose to popularity with Escape the Fate but was kicked out in 2008 after being sentenced to prison for violating probation. While in prison, Radke started a new band called From Behind These Walls, which later changed its name to Falling in Reverse. The band began recording upon his release from prison in December 2010.

As a solo musician, Radke released a rap mixtape, Watch Me, in 2014, which included collaborations with Deuce, b.LaY, Tyler Carter, Sy Ari da Kid, Jacoby Shaddix, Danny Worsnop, Andy Biersack, and Craig Mabbitt.

Radke's vocal style incorporates rapping, screaming and clean vocals.

== Early life ==
Ronald Joseph Radke was born on December 15, 1983, in St. Rose Hospital, in Las Vegas, Nevada, one of three children born to Russell Radke, the others being his brothers, Anthony James Radke (1980–2013) and Matthew Radke. Radke's mother was a drug addict and was absent for much of his childhood. In a 2018 interview with Rock Sound, he reflected that growing up without a mother figure led to difficulties in respecting women during his youth and early adulthood, and said that becoming a father helped him gain a new sense of respect and emotional maturity. He later forgave his mother and posted a picture of the two of them on Instagram after a Falling in Reverse show in 2014.

== Career ==
=== Escape the Fate (2004–2008) ===
In high school, Radke and Max Green were close friends. In 2004, Bryan Money, looking for a vocalist, contacted Max, who referred him to Radke. Bryan agreed and began auditions for a drummer. Robert Ortiz was selected, and Escape the Fate was formed. A few weeks later, Omar Espinosa, who at the time was the guitarist for Lovehatehero, joined as rhythm guitarist. The band began to play in the post-hardcore scene in Las Vegas. During that time Carson Allen joined as keyboardist. The band recorded the demo Escape the Fate EP. They signed in early 2006 with Epitaph Records after winning a radio contest judged by My Chemical Romance, which launched their career.

In May 2006, recording for the EP There's No Sympathy for the Dead began, as well as some songs from the debut album, Dying Is Your Latest Fashion. Both were produced by Radke's friend Michael "Elvis" Baskette.

Radke was later kicked out of Escape the Fate in 2008 after he was sentenced to two and a half years in prison for violating a probation given to him for owning brass knuckles. Radke had multiple previous brushes with the law due to prior narcotics offenses. He was replaced with former Blessthefall singer Craig Mabbitt.

During Radke's incarceration, a feud grew between Radke and Mabbitt. Escape the Fate insulted Radke during live performances, and Radke responded with vulgar posts on social media. When Mabbitt began dating Radke's ex-girlfriend, who had starred in an earlier Escape the Fate music video, Radke asked Mabbitt, "How does my dick taste??" on Myspace. In response to a heckler during an Escape the Fate show at 2009's Warped Tour, Mabbitt yelled, "You miss the old singer? He's locked up in Nevada. Go suck his fucking cock."

By October 28, 2013, Radke and Mabbit had made up and are now on good terms. Signifying an end to the hostilities, Escape the Fate and Falling in Reverse co-headlined the "Bury the Hatchet" tour in 2014.

=== Falling in Reverse (2008–present) ===
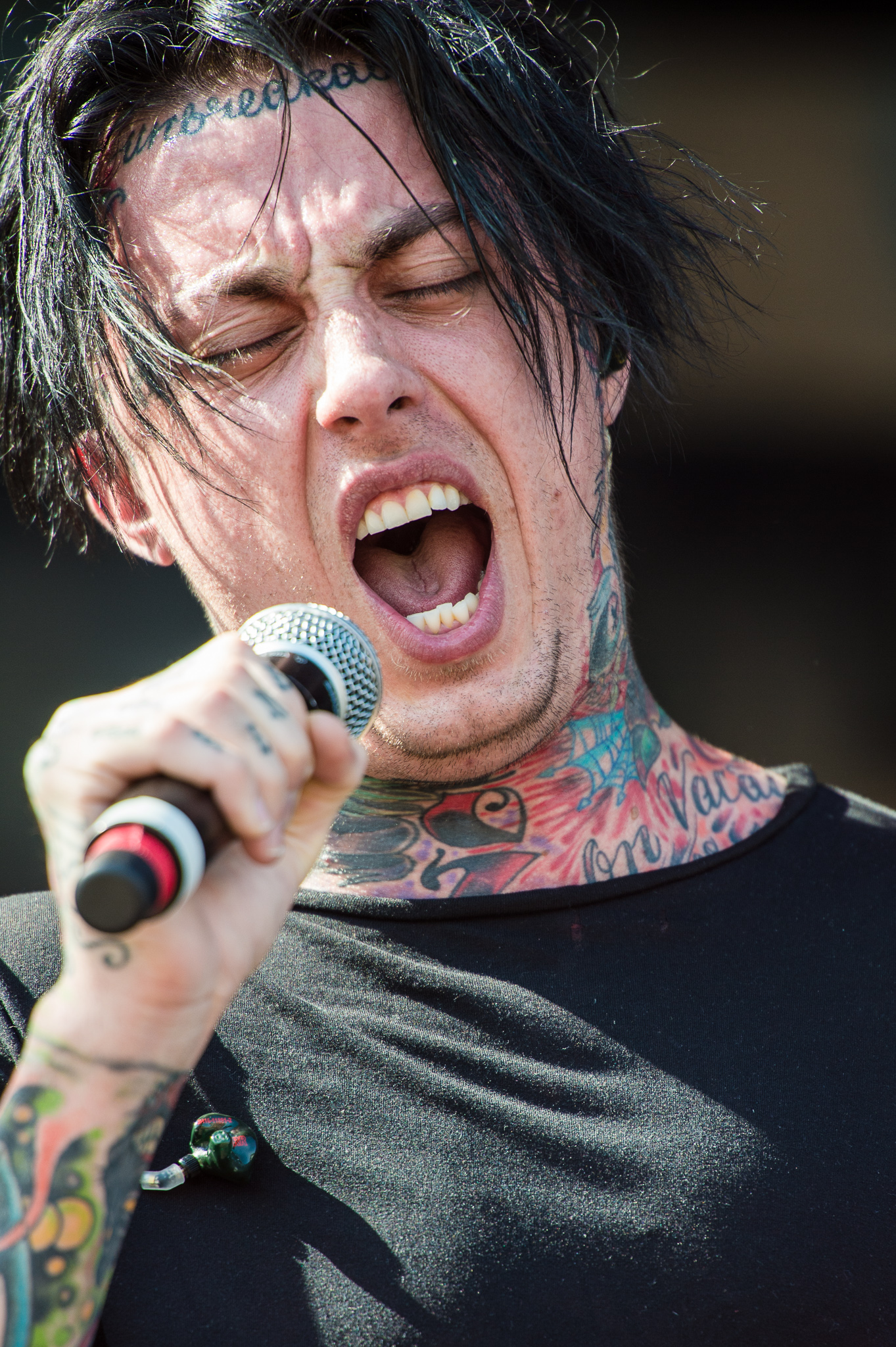
Radke with Falling in Reverse at Rock im Park 2014

While serving his sentence at High Desert State Prison, Radke wrote the first material for his upcoming band, which he described as "Norma Jean or Underoath with Katy Perry choruses." With the help of Nason Schoeffler, Radke formed Falling in Reverse, originally named From Behind these Walls. Upon his release from prison in December 2010, Radke returned to recording. Falling In Reverse released their first single "Raised by Wolves" in 2010, followed by the album The Drug in Me Is You which was released on July 26, 2011, through Epitaph Records.

Falling in Reverse's first two albums reached the top 20 in the United States, and all four have charted in the top 40. The band's song "Popular Monster" became a No. 1 hit on Billboard's Mainstream Rock chart in 2020, their first chart-topper.

=== Solo and Watch Me (2013–present) ===
On May 31, 2013, Radke launched his YouTube channel and released a solo song, "Fair-Weather Fans". The song is described as "a song Ronnie made dedicated to all the people who didn't believe in him." On June 1, he released a second song, called "What Up Earth?".

In part 3 of his interview with Alternative Press, Radke stated that he is creating a rap mixtape, produced by Charles Massabo (Kallaghan Records) that will feature some well known rap artists, the mixtape will be released in December 2013 for free. The first single off that mixtape, "Blacklist", which features b.LaY, was released on July 5, 2013, on YouTube.

A diss track titled "I Wash Cars" (also featuring b.LaY), which attacks Sumerian Records and its founder Ash Avildsen, Lorenzo "The Main Event" Antonucci, and electronicore band I See Stars, was leaked online. Ash and Lorenzo released a diss track in reply to "I Wash Cars" titled "When Ronnie Met Sally" attacking Radke. The feud between the two groups has since been resolved, and Radke is now on good terms with I See Stars, Sumerian Records, and Antonucci.

In an interview with Loudwire, he has stated that he is in the process of making a rap mixtape, which according to Radke would include an artist on every song. He has also stated that the mixtape may be released for around Christmas. On Christmas Day, he revealed a website through which subscribers received a new song, "Destiny", from the mixtape, now titled Watch Me. The track-list was also revealed but some songs did not contain feature other artists like he originally claimed. As of 2021, three songs from the mixtape have not seen official release.

In mid-2022, Radke made headlines from publications such as Loudwire when he and Papa Roach frontman Jacoby Shaddix slapped each other with tortillas while participating in the purported "Tortilla Slap Challenge".

== Personal life ==
Radke has one daughter from his relationship with model Crissy Henderson. At one point, he was engaged to Henderson, but their relationship ended in 2013 due to infidelity on his part.

Radke's older brother, Anthony, died from a traffic collision in 2013.

In late 2018, Radke began a relationship with wrestler Saraya Bevis. They broke up in late 2024.

In December 2022, Radke released a memoir, I Can Explain, written with journalist Ryan J. Downey. Radke said, "I named it that 'cause it's really funny to me 'cause I've gotten in so much trouble and have a bad reputation."

In December 2024, Radke was denied entry into the United Kingdom because of his prison sentence, forcing Falling in Reverse to cancel and postpone a scheduled UK tour.

== Legal issues ==
=== Involvement in killing and prison sentence ===
On May 6, 2006, at approximately 2:30PM, Radke met with Marcel Colquitt in Las Vegas, Nevada at the north end of Decatur Boulevard near Shadow Ridge High School to fight. Each man brought additional men to support them in the fight. During the fight, 22-year-old Chase Rader, a man who had accompanied Radke, shot 18-year-old Michael Allen Cook, killing him, as well as wounding another man, Colquitt's brother. Rader was arrested for and charged with murder but the district attorney declined to prosecute him, despite his confession, as it was determined Rader acted in self-defense.

Radke pleaded guilty to battery with substantial bodily harm and to owning and bringing brass knuckles to the brawl (illegal in Nevada); subsequently, he was placed on probation for five years and ordered to pay $92,372 in restitution to Ceda Freeman, Cook's mother. After Radke violated the terms of his probation, he was sentenced to serve two and a half years in prison.

Because of his prison sentence, Escape the Fate fired Radke. Craig Mabbitt, formerly of the band Blessthefall, replaced the imprisoned Radke.

=== Domestic violence arrest ===
On May 1, 2012, Radke was accused of striking his then-girlfriend, Sally Watts, and was subsequently arrested in Glendale, California, on August 6, 2012, after he had failed to make an appearance at any of the scheduled court hearings. He was officially charged with a misdemeanor count of corporal injury and misdemeanor false imprisonment by the Los Angeles County Sheriff's Department. He was released on $30,000 bail. On May 14, 2014, Radke pleaded no contest to disturbance of the peace.

=== Six Flags assault arrest ===
On September 29, 2012, Radke was performing as part of Falling in Reverse for FestEVIL, a metal festival for Six Flags Great Adventure's Fright Fest event, when he threw three microphone stands into the audience at the close of a performance, injuring a 16-year-old girl, who was taken to the hospital, and a 24-year-old man, who was treated at the scene. Radke was charged with simple assault and aggravated assault and released on $25,000 bail. Radke publicly apologized for his actions, saying that his actions were not in anger and that he had not intended to hurt anyone. Six Flags subsequently decided to ban hard rock and heavy metal bands from performing at the park in the future.

In the years following, he has since claimed that he never apologized for the incident and does not plan to because it "helped [his] persona", stating "I'll fucking do it again."

=== Rape allegation and defamation lawsuit ===
On June 10, 2015, it was reported that Radke had been publicly accused of sexual assault by a 25-year-old woman. The accuser alleged that Radke had sexually assaulted her after Falling in Reverse's performance at the Murray Theater on June 3, 2015. Though it was determined that Radke had contact with the woman, police found no evidence that Radke or his entourage had assaulted the woman. Radke subsequently filed a lawsuit for defamation.

=== Anthony Fantano defamation lawsuit ===
In August 2024, Radke filed a defamation lawsuit against online music critic Anthony Fantano. In the lawsuit, Radke accused Fantano of defaming him in a video titled "This Guy Sucks", as well as a since-deleted tweet where Monuments' frontman Andy Cizek referred to Radke as the "Bill Cosby of alt music". The case was later dismissed under the anti-SLAPP statute in Fantano's favor with Radke ordered to pay Fantano's legal fees.

== Discography ==
=== With Escape the Fate ===
Studio albums

- Dying Is Your Latest Fashion (2006)

Extended plays

- There's No Sympathy for the Dead (2006)
- Situations (2007)

Demos

- Escape the Fate (2005)

=== With Falling in Reverse ===
Studio albums

- The Drug in Me Is You (2011)
- Fashionably Late (2013)
- Just Like You (2015)
- Coming Home (2017)
- Popular Monster (2024)

=== Solo career ===
Mixtapes

- Watch Me (2014; partially released)

==== Singles ====
Year	Song	Album
2013	"Fair-Weather Fans"	Non-album single
2013	"What Up Earth?"	Non-album single
2013	"I Wash Cars" (featuring b.LaY)	Non-album single
2013	"Blacklist" (featuring b.LaY)	Non-album single
2014	"Destiny"	Watch Me
2014	"Stupid Boy"	Watch Me
2014	"Never the Same"	Watch Me
2014	"Already Dead"	Watch Me
2014	"Devil"	Watch Me
2014	"Asshole" (featuring Andy Biersack)	Watch Me
2014	"Who Can Stop Us?" (featuring Deuce and b.LaY)	Watch Me
2014	"Armor" (featuring Tyler Carter and Sy Ari Da Kid)	Watch Me
2015	"Brother" (featuring Danny Worsnop)	Watch Me

==== Collaborations ====
Year	Title	Contribution	Artist
2012	"Nobody Likes Me"	Vocals	Deuce
2013	"Thank You"	Vocals	A Smile from the Trenches
2013	The Life You've Chosen	Production/Songwriter/Vocals	Survive This!
2013	"For You"	Songwriter	Get Scared
2014	"Days Go By"	Vocals	b.LaY
2015	"No Way Out"	Songwriter	Now and On Earth
2015	"Getting Over You"	Vocals	Metro Station
2018	Alchemy	Production/Songwriter	Dead Girls Academy
2025	"Imdead"	Vocals	Slaughter to Prevail

== Accolades ==
Year	Nominated work	Award	Result	Ref
2011	Ronnie Radke	Revolver Magazine's 100 Greatest Living Rock Stars	Won	
2012	Ronnie Radke	Kerrang's 50 Greatest Rock Stars in the World Today	Won	
2012	Ronnie Radke	Kerrang! Awards Hero of the Year	Nominated	
2012	Ronnie Radke	Alternative Press's Vocalist of the Year	Nominated	
2013	Ronnie Radke	Alternative Press: Best Video APTV	Won	
2015	"Getting Over You" with Metro Station	Best Collaboration — Kerrang! Music Awards	Won	
