= This War Is Ours =

Studio album by Escape the Fate
- Released: October 21, 2008
- Recorded: 2007–2008
- Genres: Post-hardcore; hard rock; pop screamo
- Length: 40:07
- Label: Epitaph
- Producer: John Feldmann

Escape the Fate chronology
Dying Is Your Latest Fashion (2006)	This War Is Ours (2008)	Escape the Fate (2010)

Singles from This War Is Ours
- 1. "The Flood" Released: September 16, 2008; 2. "Something" Released: January 12, 2009; 3. "10 Miles Wide" Released: June 9, 2009; 4. "This War Is Ours (The Guillotine II)" Released: January 9, 2010

Deluxe edition

This War Is Ours is the second album by American rock band Escape the Fate. It is the first Escape the Fate album to feature former Blessthefall singer Craig Mabbitt on vocals. The album received mixed reviews from critics. It was produced by John Feldmann, and released on October 21, 2008, through Epitaph Records.

Some of Mabbitt's vocal melodies draw influence from R&B. There is also screaming on the album, drawing influence from hardcore punk. New Noise Magazine considers the album's style post-hardcore.

The album debuted at No. 35 on the Billboard 200, selling 13,000 copies in the first week of its release.

== Promotion ==
Starting on September 2, 2008, fans of Escape the Fate went to a special page on Buzznet to help unlock "the first track" off of This War Is Ours. Once the page had 50,000 viewers at the same time, the new song was then released to play and download for free. In order for a user's "page view" to be considered a contribution to the counter, the page had to remain open and active. Other sites could be used through different tabs or new windows, as long as the Buzznet page stayed open. Because this was a difficult task, fans were asked to "tell everyone [they] know to come to [the] page" in an attempt to reach 50,000 views as fast as possible. About 30 hours after the project started, the new song titled "The Flood" was unlocked and was also available for free download to anyone (whether they participated or not).

On October 1, 2008, the band released "This War Is Ours (The Guillotine II)" the (sequel to "The Guillotine" from the band's previous studio album, Dying Is Your Latest Fashion) for download. It served as the album's fourth single, with a music video being shot in Santa Ana, California, in January 2010.

== Reception ==
This War Is Ours received positive reviews from critics. Tom Forget of AllMusic gave the album three and a half stars.

== Deluxe special edition ==
In an interview with Max and Craig, they stated that they would re-release This War Is Ours with a bonus disc with many different features not seen before.

The CD includes two new songs, "Bad Blood" and "Behind the Mask", an acoustic version of "Harder Than You Know", and a remix called "This War Is Mine" by Shawn Crahan of Slipknot. It also comes with a DVD that features the music videos to "The Flood", "Something", "10 Miles Wide", and "This War Is Ours (The Guillotine II)". It also comes with a world tour documentary and a behind the music feature. The deluxe edition was released on April 27, 2010.

There is a typo in the insert booklet for "This War Is Ours (The Guillotine II)". The lyrics, albeit correct, for "10 Miles Wide" are listed.

For the "10 Miles Wide" video on the DVD, any time a curse word is said that word is censored. However, the official video for "10 Miles Wide" on Epitaph Records' YouTube channel is not censored. Behind the Music and the European Tour (featured on the DVD) also do not censor curse words.

== Track listing ==
All songs written by Escape the Fate and John Feldmann except where noted.

No.	Title	Writer(s)	Length
1.	"We Won't Back Down"		3:30
2.	"On to the Next One"		3:08
3.	"Ashley"		3:27
4.	"Something"		3:38
5.	"The Flood"		3:33
6.	"Let It Go"		3:29
7.	"You Are So Beautiful"		2:47
8.	"This War Is Ours (The Guillotine II)"		4:26
9.	"10 Miles Wide" (featuring Josh Todd)	Escape the Fate and Josh Todd	2:47
10.	"Harder Than You Know"	Escape the Fate, John Feldmann, and Josh Todd	4:20
11.	"It's Just Me"		4:56
Total length:			40:07

Deluxe version
No.	Title	Writer(s)	Length
12.	"Bad Blood"	Escape the Fate	4:17
13.	"Behind the Mask"	Escape the Fate	3:15
14.	"Harder Than You Know" (acoustic version)	Escape the Fate, John Feldmann, and Josh Todd	4:19
15.	"This War Is Mine" (Shawn "Clown" Crahan Remix)		5:42

Deluxe version bonus DVD
No.	Title	Length
1.	"The Flood" (music video)	3:49
2.	"Something" (music video)	3:40
3.	"10 Miles Wide" (music video)	3:15
4.	"This War Is Ours (The Guillotine II)" (music video)	5:31
5.	"Escape the Fate "Behind the Music"" (Video)	15:11
6.	"European Tour Documentary" (Video)	25:29

== Personnel ==
This War Is Ours album personnel as listed on AllMusic.

Escape the Fate

- Craig Mabbitt – vocals
- Monte Money – guitar, gang vocals
- Max Green – bass, gang vocals
- Robert Ortiz – drums, gang vocals

Production

- John Feldmann – production, engineer, mixing
- Brett Allen – credits director
- Matt Appleton – engineer
- Casey Howard – art direction, illustrations
- Kyle Moorman – engineer
- David Neely – credits director
- John Nicholson – drum technician
- Joey Simmrin – management
- Adam Topol – credits director

Additional musicians

- Josh Todd – co-lead vocals on "10 Miles Wide", backing vocals on "Harder Than You Know", composer
- Shawn "Clown" Crahan – remixer on "This War Is Ours"
- Matt Appleton – keyboards, synthesizers, horn, ukulele, charango, vocals
- John Feldmann – keyboards, percussion, programming, composer, vocals
- Kyle Moorman – kalimba, vocals
- Jess Neilson – flute
- Julian Feldmann – vocals
- Benji Madden – vocals

== Chart positions ==
Chart (2008)	Peak position
Australian Albums (ARIA)	33
US Billboard 200	35
US Top Rock Albums	12
US Top Digital Albums	35
US Top Independent Albums	2
US Top Catalog Albums (2010)	34
US Top Alternative Albums	8

== Release history ==
=== CD ===
Region	Date	Label
In stores	October 21, 2008	Epitaph

=== Deluxe special edition ===
Region	Date	Label
Via pre-order USA	April 23, 2010	Epitaph
Via pre-order	April 24, 2010	Epitaph
In stores	April 27, 2010	Epitaph
