= Max Green (musician) =

American musician

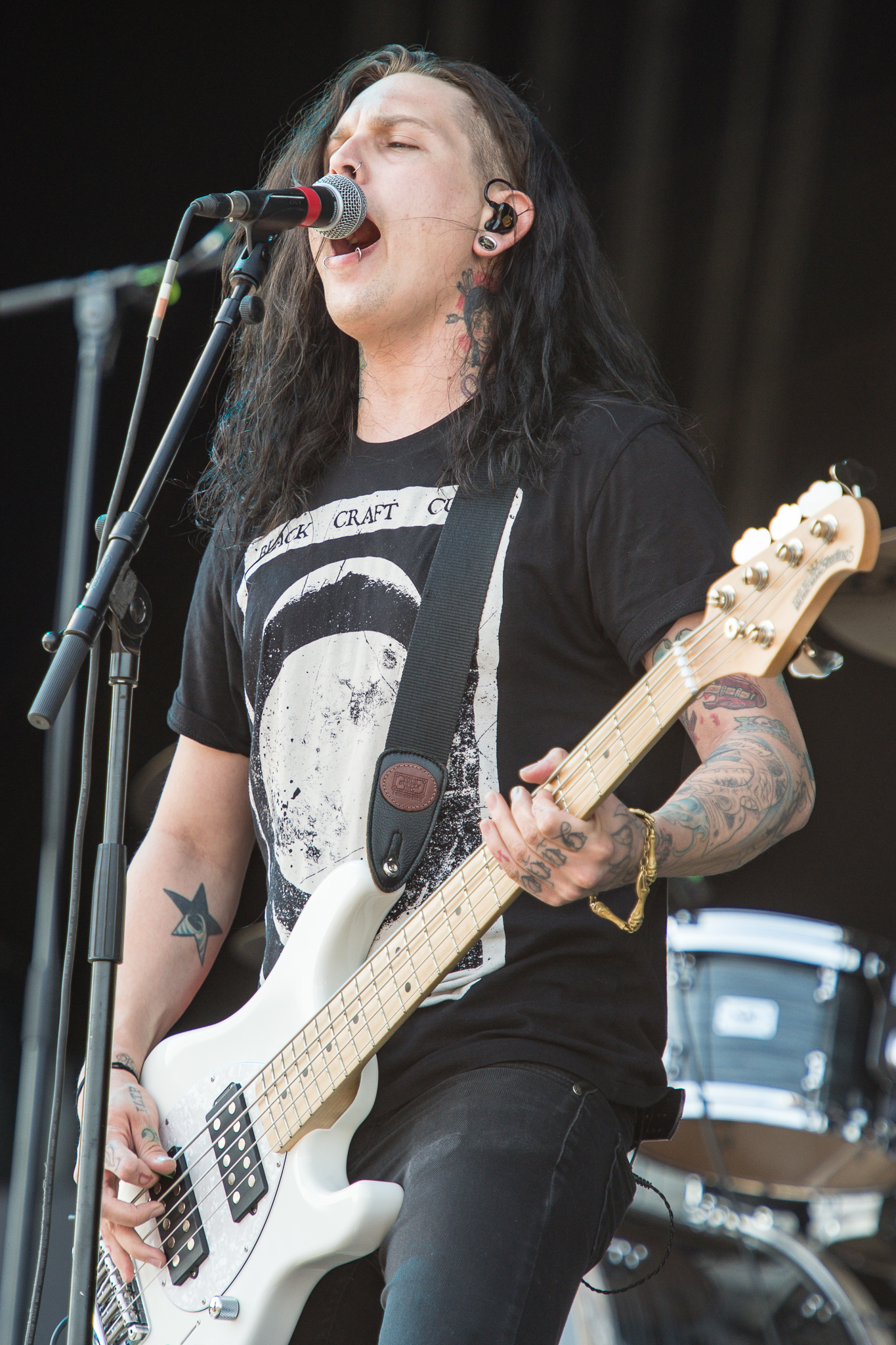
- Max Green, Rock im Park 2014

Background information
- Also known as: Max the Ripper, Violent New Max
- Born: Maxwell Scott Green; December 15, 1984 (age 41); Cincinnati, Ohio, U.S.
- Genres: Post-hardcore; metalcore; alternative rock; hard rock; alternative metal; emo
- Occupations: Musician
- Instruments: Bass; vocals; guitar
- Years active: 2000–present
- Formerly of: Escape the Fate; The Natural Born Killers; Falling in Reverse; Violent New Breed

Maxwell Scott Green (born December 15, 1984), is an American musician who is the former bassist/backing vocalist and one of the founders of Escape the Fate, the former rhythm guitarist and vocalist for The Natural Born Killers, and former bassist/backing vocalist for Falling in Reverse. He was the bassist/backing vocalist for his own band, Violent New Breed, from 2013 to 2023.

== Early life ==
Green was born in Cincinnati, Ohio, and moved to Pahrump, Nevada, when he was in 4th grade. After living there for three years, he moved to Las Vegas, Nevada.

Green has played guitar since his childhood and dreamed of becoming a professional musician. During his teenage years, Green began playing the bass guitar, inspired by the albums Progress, Resignation and ... And the Battle Begun by the band RX Bandits. He borrowed many ideas for his music from Spencer Chamberlain's (singer of Underoath) screamed vocal technique. As a teenager, Green participated in several bands as a bassist. After meeting fellow musician Ronnie Radke in high school, the two formed the band True Story, which later formed into the first-lineup Escape the Fate.

== Career ==
Green is best known for his work in Escape the Fate. He left the band and joined Falling in Reverse which he also left only months after joining. He is now the founder of a band called Violent New Breed.

=== Escape the Fate (2002–2012) ===
Green formed Escape the Fate with Ronnie Radke and Monte Money in mid-2002. After joining the post-hardcore music scene in Las Vegas, the band managed to win a contest to open up for My Chemical Romance which led to the band signing with Epitaph Records and recorded their first album, Dying Is Your Latest Fashion, which was released in September 2006. Following the arrest of Ronnie Radke, the band replaced Radke with Craig Mabbitt from Blessthefall, and released their second album, This War Is Ours. After many international tours, the band had garnered popularity worldwide, and signed with major label Interscope Records. made their major label debut with their third album, titled Escape the Fate, in November 2010.

In November 2010, Green overdosed on heroin, and was removed from Escape the Fate. This resulted in the band being forced to cancel their tours in Europe with Bullet for My Valentine. Soon after the cancellation of these tours, it was widely rumored that Green had left the band. Green later returned to the band.

On March 4, 2012, Max Green stated on his Twitter account that he was no longer playing in Escape the Fate due to personal and musical differences. Mabbitt hinted in an interview with Alternative Press that Green's departure was due to drugs. TJ Bell, former rhythm guitarist of Motionless in White, replaced Green in the position of bassist.

=== The Natural Born Killers (2012–2013) ===
After his departure from Escape the Fate, Green joined as rhythm guitarist and vocalist of the band The Natural Born Killers with Clayton Ryan as lead vocalist (formerly with A Smile from the Trenches), Brent Ashley as bassist (formerly with Wayne Static's solo band), Philip Kross as lead guitarist (formerly with Vampires Everywhere!) and Farahn Gaiter as drummer (formerly with In The Name Of). The band played their first show on May 6, 2012, in Hollywood.

On October 6, 2012. the band released their debut EP "Oblivion" and after Max Green left in late 2012, the band disbanded.

=== Returning to Escape the Fate (2013–2014) ===
On July 10, 2013, Green reunited with Escape the Fate for a one-off show playing This War Is Ours. In July of that year, Green announced during an interview to Alternative Press that he had been sober for 58 days and that the "old Max is back".

It was announced on September 16, 2013, that Green would be returning to bass for Escape the Fate's tour with Five Finger Death Punch; Green was brought back when the band's guitarist, Monte Money, had refused to go on tour.

On October 28, 2013, Craig Mabbitt announced in an interview with Ronnie Radke that Green was officially back in Escape the Fate, with Max joining as the bassist/backing vocalist, TJ Bell moving to rhythm guitarist, and Kevin Thrasher joining as the lead guitarist.

On May 9, 2014, Green announced his second departure from the band, citing lack of fulfillment and passion as reasons.

=== Falling in Reverse (2014) ===
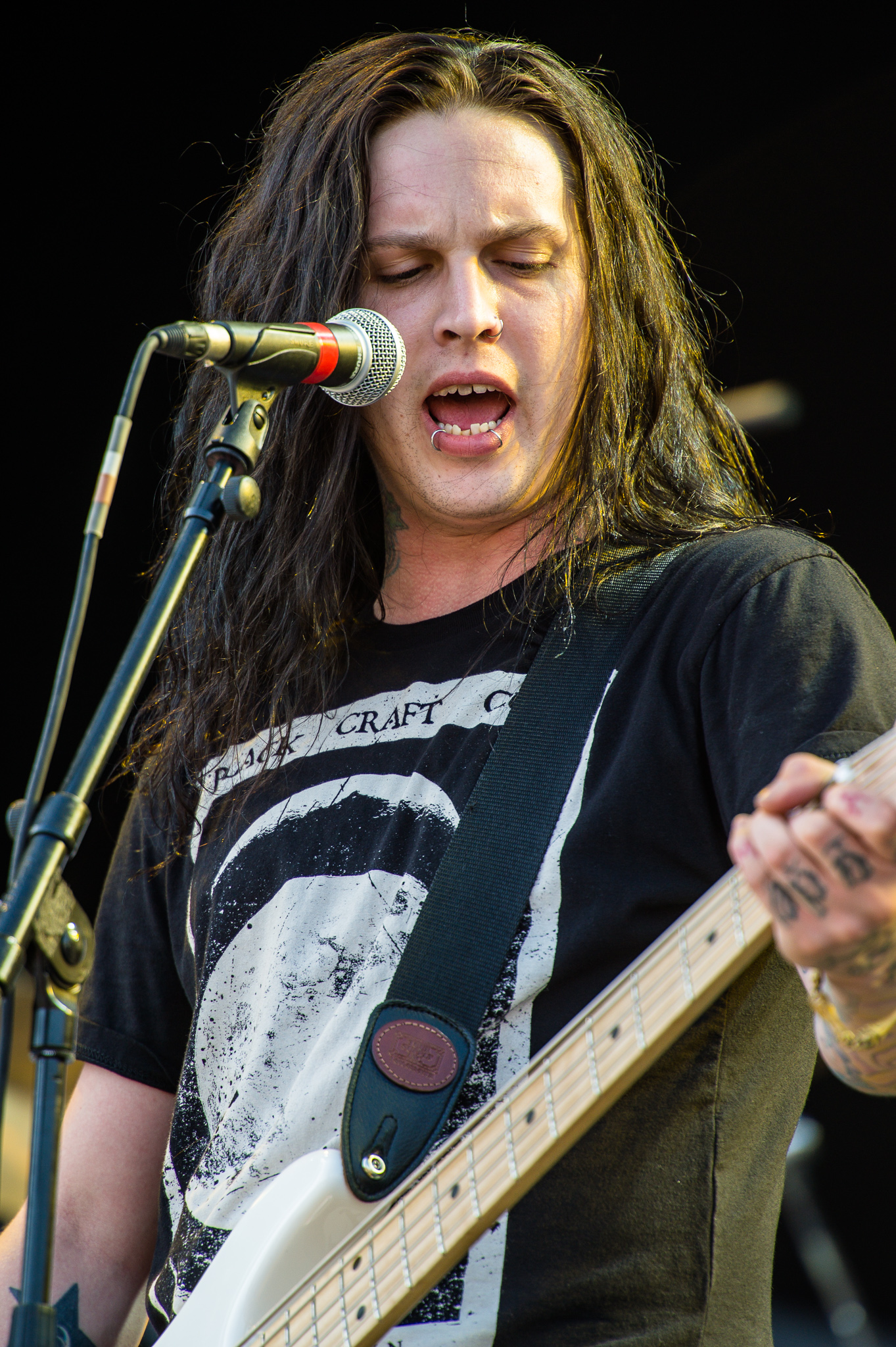
Max Green performing live with Falling in Reverse at Rock am Park in 2014

On May 12, 2014, it was announced that Green had joined Ronnie Radke's band, Falling in Reverse. Along with Green's arrival, Falling in Reverse bassist Ron Ficarro exited the band.

“Ron was probably the best bass player I've ever played with,” says Ronnie Radke, “but at this moment in time I feel it is best to part ways with him. I respect him and wish nothing but the best for him. Max quitting Escape the Fate was like a godsend. It was a no brainer to have him join. I've known him half my life and this will be a great new chapter to start."

Green adds: “Reuniting with longtime friend Ronnie Radke in his band Falling in Reverse feels nothing but right at this time in my life. I look forward to playing shows and creating memories together again with him and his amazing band of bros.”

On June 11, 2014, the band covered the Green Day song, "She's A Rebel", for a Kerrang! tribute album.

On October 6, 2014, a month before the Black Mass tour with Black Veil Brides started, it was announced that Green had left the band due to personal issues unrelated to the band. The departure was amicable.

=== Violent New Breed (2013–2023) ===
In 2013 before rejoining Escape the Fate, Max formed a band called Violent New Breed and released 2 demo tracks titled "Here We Are" and "Freight Train".

After parting ways with Escape the Fate and a short stint with Falling in Reverse in 2014, Green began Violent New Breed the following year. Shortly after its launch, he gave a preview of the new project with several demos including "Only the Strong Survive", "Casket Dream" and "Devil’s Deal".

In 2016, Violent New Breed set out on their first tour as well as issuing their debut six-song self-titled EP with Green as vocalist and rhythm guitarist, Mikey Alfero as lead guitarist, Brent Ashley as bassist and Glenn Crain as drummer.

After a period of time off, the group announced this May that they would be returning with an entirely new lineup. Green as bassist/backing vocalist, Sean Russell as vocalist/lead guitarist, Shawn McGhee as rhythm guitarist and Charlie Nicholson as Drummer.

The band marked their comeback by recruiting Light the Torch vocalist Howard Jones for “Bury Me” their first single off Bad Reputation.

Following second single “Before I Fall” in August, they're now sharing a third, “Worth It.” The new track mixes emotion-tinged melodic vocals with face-melting riffs, striking the perfect balance. That balance was also felt in the studio, with Green revealing the production solidified his excitement in his new lineup.

Days ahead of their premiere album release and the first collection of work with their new lineup, the band are now sharing “Crazy" video The track opens with muted riffs before blasting into high-energy instrumentation with gritty vocals.

The band's full-length, "Bad Reputation", released on October 25, 2019, via SBG Records.

In late 2019, the lead singer left the band, leaving the band in a hiatus. In December 2021, the band posted on their Instagram a completely new line up, with Max still playing bass.

On November 3, 2023, Violent New Breed announced they had broken up over creative differences.

== Career as manager and producer ==
Green was a judge at a local battle of the bands held at University Theatre in Las Vegas, Nevada, where the Seventh Plague was competing. He began managing them; he later managed the bands Witness the Forecast, and Secrets Kept in Suicide. In 2013 he produced the band The Culprit. In 2015 Green managed the band With Full Force.

== Discography ==
with Escape the Fate

- Escape the Fate (EP) (2005)
- There's No Sympathy for the Dead (EP) (2006)
- Dying Is Your Latest Fashion (2006)
- Situations (EP) (2007)
- This War Is Ours (2008)
- Escape the Fate (2010)

with The Natural Born Killers

- Oblivion (EP) (2012)

with Violent New Breed

- Violent New Breed (EP) (2016)
- Bad Reputation (2019)
- Bloody Lip Season (Single, 2022)
- Sanctuary (Single, 2022)
- Ruination (Single, 2022)

Collaborations

- "Abandoned" by Saving Shemiah (Under Fire - EP, 2017)
- "They're All Dead" by Monte Money (Single, 2026)
