= Alternative Press Music Awards =

Former American annual music awards show

- Awarded for: Music achievement
- Location: Cleveland, Ohio
- Country: United States
- Presented by: Alternative Press
- First award: 2014
- Final award: 2017
- Website: altpress.com/apmas

The Alternative Press Music Awards was an annual music awards show in the United States, founded by the music magazine Alternative Press.

== History ==
On April 24, 2014, Alternative Press announced they were organizing an award show to be held on July 21, 2014, at the Rock and Roll Hall of Fame and Museum in Cleveland. Mark Hoppus, bassist and vocalist of the pop-punk band Blink-182, hosted the event's debut. The first show was aired live on AXS TV and Idobi Radio nationwide and featured live performances by Fall Out Boy, Joan Jett & the Blackhearts, the Misfits, A Day to Remember, All Time Low, Falling in Reverse with Tyler Carter and Coolio, Asking Alexandria, Sleeping with Sirens, Twenty One Pilots and Brendon Urie of Panic! at the Disco. 15 categories were awarded, with 12 of them given away by the readers through online voting. The inaugural ceremony was attended by 6,000 people, with Fall Out Boy winning Artist of the Year.

In 2015, the awards ceremony was moved to Cleveland's Quicken Loans Arena. It featured hosts Alex Gaskarth and Jack Barakat of All Time Low and performances by Rob Zombie, Motionless in White, New Found Glory with Hayley Williams of Paramore, Panic! at the Disco and headliners Weezer.

Due to the Republican National Convention, the 2016 APMAs were moved to Value City Arena in Columbus, Ohio. The show included performances by Judas Priest vocalist Rob Halford collaborating with Babymetal, Third Eye Blind with Mayday Parade and the Maine, Black Veil Brides frontman Andy Biersack with Mikey Way, John Feldmann and Quinn Allman, Machine Gun Kelly, Of Mice & Men, Papa Roach, Good Charlotte and headliners A Day to Remember.

The fourth annual show was hosted by Andy Biersack of Black Veil Brides.

== List of winners ==
=== 2014 ===
Best Vocalist (Presented by Victory Records)	Best Live Band (Presented by Vans Warped Tour)
Brendon Urie (Panic! at the Disco); Andy Biersack (Black Veil Brides); Vic Fuentes (Pierce the Veil); Kellin Quinn (Sleeping With Sirens); Hayley Williams (Paramore)	Pierce the Veil; A Day to Remember; All Time Low; Asking Alexandria; Fall Out Boy; Twenty One Pilots
Breakthrough Band (Presented by Beats Music)	Best Bassist (Presented by Dyin 2 Live)
Crown the Empire; The Color Morale; Issues; Letlive; The Story So Far; Twenty One Pilots	Jaime Preciado (Pierce the Veil); Jeremy Davis (Paramore); Zack Merrick (All Time Low); Ryan Neff (Miss May I); Devin "Ghost" Sola (Motionless in White); Pete Wentz (Fall Out Boy)
Best International Band (Presented by Zepeda Brothers Productions)	Artist Philanthropic Award (Presented by Sub City/Take Action)
Bring Me the Horizon; Asking Alexandria; Crossfaith; Parkway Drive; Silverstein; Frank Turner	All Time Low (Skate4Cancer); Memphis May Fire (peta2); Modern Baseball (1BlueString); Pierce the Veil (Keep A Breast); Rise Against (Shirts For A Cure); The Used (Living The Dream)
Best Guitarist (Presented by Gibson)	Best Drummer (Presented by DW Drums)
Phil Manansala (Of Mice & Men); JB Brubaker (August Burns Red); Synyster Gates (Avenged Sevenfold); Jack O'Shea (Bayside); Chris Rubey (The Devil Wears Prada); Jacky Vincent (Falling In Reverse)	Mike Fuentes (Pierce the Veil); Jess Bowen (The Summer Set); Josh Dun (Twenty One Pilots); Matt Greiner (August Burns Red); Luke Holland (The Word Alive); Ryan Seaman (Falling In Reverse)
Most Dedicated Fans (Presented by Fearless Records)	Song Of The Year (Presented by Epitaph Records)
Black Veil Brides; All Time Low; Avenged Sevenfold; Mayday Parade; My Chemical Romance; Pierce the Veil	All Time Low with Vic Fuentes of Pierce the Veil - "A Love Like War"; Bring Me the Horizon - "Shadow Moses"; Fall Out Boy - "My Songs Know What You Did in the Dark (Light Em Up)"; Falling In Reverse - "Alone"; Paramore - "Still Into You"; Sleeping With Sirens with MGK - "Alone"
Album Of The Year (Presented by Journeys)	Artist Of The Year (Presented by Monster Energy)
Bring Me the Horizon - Sempiternal; A Day To Remember - Common Courtesy; Avenged Sevenfold - Hail To The King; Black Veil Brides - Wretched and Divine: The Story of the Wild Ones; Fall Out Boy - Save Rock and Roll; Paramore - Paramore; Sleeping With Sirens - Feel; Touché Amoré - Is Survived By; Twenty One Pilots - Vessel; The Wonder Years - The Greatest Generation	Fall Out Boy; A Day To Remember; Avenged Sevenfold; Black Veil Brides; Bring Me the Horizon; Of Mice & Men; Panic! At The Disco; Paramore; Pierce the Veil; Sleeping With Sirens
Guitar Legend Award (Presented by Rock and Roll Hall of Fame)	Vanguard Award (Presented by AXS TV)
Slash	Billy Corgan
Icon Award (Presented by Blackstar Amplification)
Joan Jett

=== 2015 ===
Best Vocalist	Best Live Band (Presented by Macbeth)
Hayley Williams (Paramore); Tyler Carter (Issues); Vic Fuentes (Pierce the Veil); Lynn Gunn (PVRIS); Adam Lazzara (Taking Back Sunday); Jeremy McKinnon (A Day To Remember)	A Day To Remember; Letlive; Panic! At The Disco; Paramore; Twenty One Pilots; The Wonder Years
Breakthrough Band (Presented by Splat!)	Best Bassist (Presented by Razor & Tie Records)
PVRIS; Beartooth; Echosmith; Modern Baseball; Neck Deep; This Wild Life	Zack Merrick (All Time Low); Kyle Fasel (Real Friends); Jeph Howard (The Used); Ryan Jay Johnson (Letlive); Devin "Ghost" Sola (Motionless in White); Dallon Weekes (Panic! At The Disco)
Best International Band	Artist Philanthropic Award (Presented by Sub City/Take Action)
The 1975; The Amity Affliction; Marmozets; New Politics; Northlane; Crossfaith	Taking Back Sunday (American Cancer Society); Andrew McMahon in the Wilderness (Dear Jack Foundation); Bayside (The Human Rights Campaign); Koji (Doctors Without Borders); Jake Luhrs (August Burns Red) (HeartSupport); Simple Plan (The Simple Plan Foundation)
Best Guitarist	Best Drummer (Presented by DW Drums)
Tony Perry (Pierce the Veil); Arun Bali (Saves The Day); Jordan Buckley (Every Time I Die); Kevin Skaff (A Day To Remember); Will Swan (Dance Gavin Dance); Jacky Vincent (Falling In Reverse)	Rian Dawson (All Time Low); Cyrus Bolooki (New Found Glory); Jake Garland (Memphis May Fire); Adam Gray (Texas in July); Matt Greiner (August Burns Red); Luke Holland (The Word Alive)
Best Underground Band (Presented by Sumerian Records)	Most Dedicated Fans (Presented by Fearless Records)
Being As An Ocean; The Hotelier; Knuckle Puck; Major League; State Champs; Tigers Jaw	Hustlers (All Time Low); The Runaways (Crown The Empire); Overcast Kids (Fall Out Boy); Creatures (Motionless in White); Parafamily (Paramore); Skeleton Clique (Twenty One Pilots)
Song Of The Year (Presented by Epitaph Records)	Album Of The Year (Presented by Journeys)
Sleeping With Sirens - "Kick Me"; Beartooth - "Beaten In Lips"; Motionless in White - "Reincarnate"; Real Friends - "I Don't Love You Anymore"; Set It Off - "Why Worry"; PVRIS - "My House"	Black Veil Brides - Black Veil Brides; Beartooth - Disgusting; Circa Survive - Descensus; Every Time I Die - From Parts Unknown; Frnkiero andthe cellabration - Stomachaches; Gerard Way - Hesitant Alien; Issues - Issues; La Dispute - Rooms of the House; Linkin Park - The Hunting Party; Real Friends - Maybe This Place Is the Same and We're Just Changing
Artist Of The Year (Presented by Monster Energy)	Best Music Video (Presented by Journeys)
Issues; Against Me!; Black Veil Brides; Crown The Empire; Motionless in White; New Found Glory; Of Mice & Men; Slipknot; Taking Back Sunday; Weezer	Bring Me the Horizon - "Drown"; A Day To Remember - "End Of Me"; Fall Out Boy - "Centuries"; Modern Baseball - "Your Graduation"; PVRIS - "St. Patrick"; Set It Off - "Why Worry"
Best Fandom (Presented by Tumblr)	Icon Award (Presented by Artery Recordings)
5 Seconds of Summer	X
Vanguard Award (Presented by Equal Vision/MerchNow)
Rob Zombie

=== 2016 ===
Best Vocalist (Presented by SharpTone Records)	Best Guitarist (Presented by Paul Reed Smith Guitars)
Patrick Stump (Fall Out Boy); Alex Gaskarth (All Time Low); Caleb Shomo (Beartooth); Lzzy Hale (Halestorm); Kellin Quinn (Sleeping With Sirens); Corey Taylor (Slipknot)	Jack Fowler (Sleeping With Sirens); Kevin Skaff (A Day To Remember); JB Brubaker (August Burns Red); Kellen McGregor (Memphis May Fire); Chad Gilbert (New Found Glory); Misha Mansoor (Periphery)
Best Bassist (Presented by Razor & Tie Records)	Best Drummer (Presented by DW Drums)
Skyler Acord (Issues); Ralph Sica (Being As An Ocean); Ryan Neff (Miss May I); Matthew Taylor (Motion City Soundtrack); Ahren Stringer (The Amity Affliction); Kelen Capener (The Story So Far)	Christian Coma (Black Veil Brides); Loniel Robinson (Letlive); Jerod Boyd (Miss May I); Dani Washington (Neck Deep); Maxx Danziger (Set It Off); Aaron Gillespie (Underoath)
Best International Band (Presented by Joey Sturgis Tones)	Best Music Video (Presented by Journeys)
You Me At Six; As It Is; Babymetal; Marianas Trench; One OK Rock; Parkway Drive	Panic! At The Disco - "Emperor's New Clothes"; All Time Low - "Something's Gotta Give"; August Burns Red - "Identity"; State Champs - "If I'm Lucky"; The Wonder Years - "Cardinals"; Twenty One Pilots - "Stressed Out"
Song Of The Year (Presented by Epitaph Records)	Best Live Band (Presented by Audio-Technica)
Panic! At The Disco - "Hallelujah"; Falling In Reverse - "Just Like You"; Never Shout Never - "Hey! We Ok"; Of Mice & Men - "Would You Still Be There"; Pierce the Veil - "The Divine Zero"; State Champs - "Secrets"	Neck Deep; Attila; Beartooth; Issues; Motionless in White; Slipknot
Artist Philanthropic Award (Presented by Hopeless Records/Sub City)	Most Dedicated Fanbase (Presented by Fearless Records)
Jake Luhrs (August Burns Red) (HeartSupport); Andrew McMahon in the Wilderness (Dear Jack Foundation); The Used (Living The Dream); The Wonder Years (Puppies Behind Bars/After-School All-Stars/The Herren Project/Futures Without Violence); This Wild Life (National Breast Cancer Foundation (United States)); You Me At Six (Passport: Back To The Bars/The Ghost Inside U.K. Fundraiser/PETA)	The Ghost Inside; Issues; Mayday Parade; New Years Day; PVRIS; The Maine
Breakthrough Band (Presented by Fueled By Ramen/Roadrunner Records)	Best Underground Band (Presented by Entertainment One Music)
State Champs; I Prevail; Knuckle Puck; Neck Deep; New Years Day; Set It Off	Too Close to Touch; Cane Hill; Creeper; Moose Blood; ROAM; Tiny Moving Parts
Album Of The Year (Presented by Journeys)	Artist Of The Year (Presented by Monster Energy)
Twenty One Pilots - Blurryface; All Time Low - Future Hearts; August Burns Red - Found in Far Away Places; Bring Me the Horizon - That's the Spirit; Knuckle Puck - Copacetic; The Maine - American Candy; Marilyn Manson - The Pale Emperor; Neck Deep - Life's Not Out to Get You; Sleeping With Sirens - Madness; State Champs - Around the World and Back	Twenty One Pilots; All Time Low; Beartooth; PVRIS; Fall Out Boy; Motionless in White; Panic! At The Disco; Real Friends; Sleeping With Sirens; Slipknot
Vans "Off The Wall" Award (Presented by Vans)	Icon Award (Presented by Equal Vision/MerchNow)
Yellowcard	Marilyn Manson
Classic Album Award (Presented by Eleven Seven Music)
Good Charlotte - The Young and the Hopeless

=== 2017 ===
Best Vocalist	Best Guitarist (Presented by Paul Reed Smith Guitars)
Lynn Gunn (PVRIS); Ben Barlow (Neck Deep); Cody Carson (Set It Off); Derek DiScanio (State Champs); John O'Callaghan (The Maine); Keith Buckley (Every Time I Die)	Jordan Buckley (Every Time I Die); Ben Weinman (The Dillinger Escape Plan); Claudio Sanchez (Coheed and Cambria); Reba Meyers (Code Orange); Steve Menoian (I Prevail); Teppei Teranishi (Thrice)
Best Drummer (Presented by Guitar Center/Remo/SJC Drums)	Best Bassist
Frank Zummo (Sum 41); Arejay Hale (Halestorm); Aric Improta (Night Verses); Dean Butterworth (Good Charlotte); Matt Mingus (Dance Gavin Dance); JP "Rook" Cappelletty (Machine Gun Kelly)	Fieldy Arvizu (Korn); Alex Dean (Architects); Chris Hinkley (I the Mighty); Fat Mike (NOFX); Ryan Scott Graham (State Champs); Sergio Vega (Deftones)
Best Hard Rock Artist (Presented by Metal Blade Records/Blacklight Media)	Best New Artist Music Video (Presented by Journeys)
The Pretty Reckless; Bullet For My Valentine; Halestorm; Highly Suspect; In This Moment; Korn	With Confidence - "Voldemort"; K.Flay - "Blood in the Cut"; PUP - "Sleep in the Heat"; SWMRS - "Palm Trees"; Tiny Moving Parts - "Common Cold"; Watsky - "Don't Be Nice"
Best Music Video (Presented by Journeys)	Best Underground Band
State Champs - "Losing Myself"; Highly Suspect - "Bloodfeather"; I See Stars - "Calm Snow"; Korn - "Insane"; Memphis May Fire feat. Jacoby Shaddix - "This Light I Hold"; Sum 41 - "Fake My Own Death"	Silent Planet; Broadside; Knocked Loose; Movements; Palaye Royale; With Confidence
Best Breakthrough Band (Presented by SharpTone Records)	Most Dedicated Fanbase (Presented by Fearless Records)
Waterparks; Avatar; Creeper; Ice Nine Kills; Moose Blood; One OK Rock	Twenty One Pilots; Melanie Martinez; Motionless in White; Paramore; PVRIS; Sleeping With Sirens
Song Of The Year (Presented by Epitaph Records)	Best Live Band
Andy Black - "We Don't Have to Dance"; A Day To Remember - "Paranoia"; Pierce the Veil - "Circles"; Machine Gun Kelly - "Alpha Omega"; Real Friends - "Mess"; Waterparks - "Stupid For You"	Falling In Reverse; Beartooth; Dance Gavin Dance; In This Moment; Issues; NOFX
Album Of The Year (Presented by Journeys)	Artist Of The Year
Pierce the Veil - Misadventures; Andy Black - The Shadow Side; Tonight Alive - Limitless; Architects - All Our Gods Have Abandoned Us; Attila - Chaos; Beartooth - Aggressive; Every Time I Die - Low Teens; I Prevail - Lifelines; Moose Blood - Blush; Waterparks - Double Dare	Panic! At The Disco; A Day To Remember; Blink-182; Fall Out Boy; Good Charlotte; Green Day; Machine Gun Kelly; Pierce the Veil; Sum 41; The Pretty Reckless
