= Fashionably Late =

Fashionably Late may refer to:

- Fashionably Late (EP), a 2025 EP by XO
- Fashionably Late (Falling in Reverse album), 2013
  - Fashionably Late (song)
- Fashionably Late (The Slickee Boys album), 1988
- Fashionably Late (Honor Society album), 2009
- Fashionably Late (Linda Thompson album), 2002
- FASH-ionably Late, a 2014 collaboration EP by Fashawn and The Alchemist

== See also ==
- Fashionably Late with Stacy London, a late-night talk and variety show hosted by Stacy London
- Fashionably Late with Rachel Zoe, an American fashion-themed talk show hosted by Rachel Zoe
