= Just like You =

Just like You may refer to:

== Albums ==
- Just Like You (Allison Iraheta album) or the title song, 2009
- Just Like You (Crystal Shawanda album) or the title song, 2012
- Just Like You (Falling in Reverse album) or the title song (see below), 2015
- Just like You (Keb' Mo' album) or the title song, 1996
- Just like You (Keyshia Cole album) or the title song, 2007
- Just Like You, by Sacha, 2014
- Just like You, an EP by Poster Children, 1994

== Songs ==
- "Just Like You" (Falling in Reverse song), 2015
- "Just Like You" (Louis Tomlinson song), 2017
- "Just Like You" (Three Days Grace song), 2004
- "Just Like You", by Chromatics from Dear Tommy, unreleased (2015)
- "Just Like You", by Fergie from Double Dutchess, 2017
- "Just Like You", by Fred Wesley and the Horny Horns from Say Blow by Blow Backwards, 1979
- "Just Like You", by George Canyon from What I Do, 2008
- "Just Like You", by Hannah Montana from the Hannah Montana film soundtrack, 2006
- "Just Like You", by Ian Brown from My Way, 2009
- "Just Like You", by Jessica Mauboy from Hilda, 2019
- "Just Like You", by Jojo Mason, 2025
- "Just Like You", by Joyner Lucas from 508-507-2209, 2017
- "Just Like You", by Lecrae from Rehab, 2010
- "Just Like You", by Michelle Williams from Journey to Freedom, 2014
- "Just Like You", by Ministry from Twitch, 1986
- "Just Like You", by NF from Clouds (The Mixtape), 2021
- "Just Like You", by Robbie Nevil from Day 1, 1991
- "Just Like You", by Roxy Music from Stranded, 1973
- "Just Like You", by Solange Knowles from Solo Star, 2002
