= God, If You Are Above... =

2014 single by Falling in Reverse

Single by Falling in Reverse

from the album Just Like You
- Released: December 15, 2014
- Genre: Post-hardcore
- Length: 3:37
- Label: Epitaph
- Songwriters: Ronald Radke; Charles Massabo; Jack Vincent; Michael Baskette
- Producer: Michael "Elvis" Baskette

Falling in Reverse singles chronology
"Bad Girls Club" (2013)	"God, If You Are Above..." (2014)	"Guillotine IV (The Final Chapter)" (2015)

"God, If You Are Above..." is the first single from Falling in Reverse's third album Just Like You. It was released on December 15, 2014.

== Background ==
The song was released on the same day of Ronnie Radke's birthday. The lyrics talk about Ronnie who begins to question God with his fear that the whole world will disappear one day, before wondering that if he does, he will have lived his life the way he should.

== Personnel ==
Falling in Reverse

- Ronnie Radke – lead vocals
- Jacky Vincent – lead guitar, backing vocals
- Derek Jones – rhythm guitar, backing vocals
- Ryan Seaman – drums, percussion, backing vocals

Additional

- Charles Kallaghan Massabo – bass

== Charts ==
Chart (2014–2015)	Peak position
US Hot Rock & Alternative Songs (Billboard)	45
US Mainstream Rock (Billboard)	28
