= The Drug in Me Is You (song) =

2011 single by Falling in Reverse

Single by Falling in Reverse

from the album The Drug in Me Is You
- Released: June 28, 2011
- Length: 3:39
- Label: Epitaph
- Songwriters: Ronald Radke; Michael 'Elvis' Baskette; David Holdredge
- Producer: Michael Baskette

Falling in Reverse singles chronology
"Raised by Wolves" (2011)	"The Drug in Me Is You" (2011)	"I'm Not a Vampire" (2011)

Music video
- "The Drug in Me Is You" on YouTube

"The Drug in Me Is You" is the second single from American rock band Falling in Reverse's debut studio album The Drug in Me Is You, which was released on June 28, 2011. The music video for the song had over 100 million views/streams on YouTube and Spotify.

An orchestral version entitled "The Drug in Me Is Reimagined" composed specially for Radke by pianist and composer Sean Rooney was released on February 13, 2020, to commemorate The Drug in Me Is You being certified gold by the Recording Industry Association of America (RIAA).

== Background ==
"The Drug in Me Is" was written and composed by Ronnie Radke. On June 21, 2011, a 33-second preview of the song was released, and the full song was released three days later. The music video released on June 28 shows Ronnie Radke leaving the room with a woman caressing him, to which he is later approached by two female police officers that take him to jail and court.

== Accolades ==
Year	Award	Result	Place	Ref
2011	Revolver Magazine's The 5 Best Songs of 2011	Won	5th	
2012	Kerrang! Awards 2012: Best Single	Nominated	—	

== Personnel ==
Credits adapted from Tidal.

=== Original version ===
Falling in Reverse

- Ronnie Radke — lead vocals
- Jacky Vincent — lead guitar
- Derek Jones — rhythm guitar, backing vocals
- Mika Horiuchi — bass, backing vocals (only appears in credits and music video)
- Ryan Seaman — drums, percussion, backing vocals (only appears in credits and music video)
- Nason Schoeffler — bass, backing vocals (uncredited performance)
- Scott Gee — drums, percussion, backing vocals (uncredited performance)

Additional personnel

- Michael "Elvis" Baskette — producer, songwriting
- Dave Holdredge — mixing, engineer, songwriting

=== Reimagined ===
Falling in Reverse

- Ronnie Radke — lead vocals, producer
- Max Georgiev — guitars
- Tyler Burgess — bass
- Johnny Mele — drums, percussion

Additional personnel

- Tyler Smyth — producer
- Sean Rooney — piano, composition

== Certifications ==
Region	Certification	Certified units/sales
United Kingdom (BPI)	Silver	200,000^{‡}
New Zealand (RMNZ)	Gold	15,000^{‡}
^{‡} Sales+streaming figures based on certification alone.

== Reimagined version ==
"The Drug in Me Is Reimagined"

Single by Falling in Reverse
- Released: February 13, 2020
- Length: 5:41
- Label: Epitaph
- Songwriters: Ronald Radke; Michael Elvis Baskette; Dave Holdredge
- Producers: Tyler Smyth; Ronnie Radke

Falling in Reverse singles chronology
"Popular Monster" (2019)	"The Drug in Me Is Reimagined" (2020)	"Carry On" (2020)

Music video
- "The Drug in Me Is Reimagined" on YouTube

"The Drug in Me Is Reimagined" is the orchestral rock version of "The Drug in Me Is You", released on February 13, 2020, to commemorate The Drug in Me Is You being certified gold by RIAA. The music video, directed by Jensen Noen, shows Ronnie Radke playing the piano, featuring an orchestra of cellos.

=== Charts ===
Chart (2020)	Peak position
Hungary (Single Top 40)	32
US Hot Rock & Alternative Songs (Billboard)	29
