= Don't Panic (All Time Low album) =

Studio album by All Time Low
- Released: October 8, 2012
- Recorded: April–May 2012
- Genres: Pop-punk; emo pop
- Length: 40:57
- Label: Hopeless
- Producers: Mike Green; Alex Gaskarth

All Time Low chronology
Dirty Work (2011)	Don't Panic (2012)	Future Hearts (2015)

Singles from Don't Panic
- 1. "For Baltimore" Released: August 28, 2012; 2. "Somewhere in Neverland" Released: September 17, 2012; 3. "Backseat Serenade" Released: July 2, 2013; 4. "A Love Like War" Released: September 2, 2013

Don't Panic is the fifth studio album by American rock band All Time Low. After signing with major label Interscope Records in November 2009, the band worked on their fourth album Dirty Work. It was delayed a number of times until its eventual release in June 2011. During that time, the people at the label that had signed the band were fired or replaced. By the end of the year, vocalist/guitarist Alex Gaskarth said Dirty Work was "kind of dead in the water", prompting the band to work on their next album shortly afterwards. After completing a week of pre-production in April 2012, the band started recording Don't Panic with Mike Green, in Los Angeles, California and finished in May. The album features appearances from Cassadee Pope of Hey Monday, Anthony Raneri of Bayside and Jason Vena of Acceptance.

The band toyed with the concept of self-releasing the album, before having discussions with various record labels. After signing with independent label Hopeless Records, "The Reckless and the Brave" was released as a promotional single. In August, Don't Panic was announced for release in October and the band performed at the Reading and Leeds Festivals in the UK. "For Baltimore" and "Somewhere in Neverland" were released as singles in August and September, respectively. Don't Panic was released on October 8. In October and November, the band went on The Rockshow at the End of the World Tour across the US. During the tour, a music video for "For Baltimore". In early 2013, the band went on a co-headlining North America tour with Yellowcard, before embarking on a UK tour. It was followed by appearances at Soundwave festival in Australia. A music video for "Somewhere in Neverland" premiered on MTV in mid-March.

Throughout April and May 2013, the band went on a co-headlining North America tour with Pierce the Veil. Also in May, a music video was released for "Backseat Serenade", and the band headlined Slam Dunk festival in the UK. In September, Don't Panic was reissued under the title Don't Panic: It's Longer Now!. The reissue featured four new songs, namely "A Love Like War" which featured Vic Fuentes of Pierce the Veil, as well as acoustic versions of other songs. "A Love Like War" was released as a single, as well as a music video for the song, in September. The band then supported A Day to Remember on their tour of the US in September and October. In March 2014, the band went on a UK tour, which was followed by a US tour, dubbed A Love Like Tour, until May. A music video for "The Irony of Choking on a Lifesaver" was released on May 14, which consists of footage from their preceding UK tour.

== Background ==
In November 2009, All Time Low announced they had signed to major label Interscope Records. Close to the end of the recording process for Dirty Work, vocalist/guitarist Alex Gaskarth said the album would be released in January 2011. However, in that month Gaskarth said the album would be released sometime between January and March. In February, Gaskarth said the album would not be released in March due to "restructuring" of Interscope Records and a number of records have been pushed back, including Dirty Work. He followed this up by saying that "a bunch of people got fired. We just wanted to make sure we didn't get caught up in that shit storm essentially". Drummer Rian Dawson said people were "either replaced or fired or let go or reassigned and none of the people that kind of believed in us and said 'we can do this together' were still there." The band released eventually Dirty Work in June. Towards the end of the year, the band parted ways with Interscope Records. Gaskarth said Dirty Work was "kind of dead in the water". According to Dawson, the group said "look, this isn't the same label we signed with, you don't really have much interest in our band, let's just split ways. ... And they were like, alright! And it was truly that easy."

Gaskarth said "I don't fault the folks at Interscope for any of this. ... Unfortunately we got lost in the mess of big business and higher-ups making deals. ... We asked to be released from our contract, and they understood why." Following the departure from Interscope Records, the band held a meeting about what they would do next. Shortly afterwards, the band began working on their next album. In mid-October, Gaskarth revealed that the band were in the process of demoing new material. In early November, Gaskarth said the band have been working on music while on tour. He mentioned that he was "really excited about the direction of the new music and where everything might be going" and that they might continue writing into December. On December 1, AbsolutePunk reported that the band were working with Mike Green. It was also reported that Cassadee Pope of Hey Monday was recording harmonies for one of the band's demos. In January and February, the band went on a tour of the UK. After returning home, Gaskarth "realised that I just had so much to say" and subsequently wrote nine songs. He also said he plans to write a further 10 or 11 songs prior to entering a studio.

== Recording ==
On March 8, the band said they were in a studio. On March 12, Gaskarth posted that they were working with Patrick Stump of Fall Out Boy. On April 19, Dawson said the group had completed seven days of pre-production, as well as stating that he recorded drums in a 10–11 hour span. The band were recording in Los Angeles with Green, who had previously produced a number of songs on Dirty Work. In addition, Gaskarth co-produced the sessions. The band self-funded the sessions with the aim of earning their money back later on. According to Gaskarth, Green "made a lot of exceptions by giving us a break financially by making the record first" and would follow it up whenever the band signed to a record label. Gaskarth said deciding to work with Green again was "a no-brainer" since he "felt the most natural" as well as "complements us as a band. He feels like a fifth member. Like, he pulls everything together."

With Nothing Personal (2009) and Dirty Work, the band worked with several producers, which made the albums come across as "a little bit inconsistent", according to Gaskarth. Working solely with Green for this album "felt like it was the best way to get a solid, clear vision and a concise sound throughout the whole record." He went on to say they wanted to "make this album ourselves, and for us and the fans, with no outside opinions diluting or influencing the vision." According to Gaskarth, the only outside person to visit the studio was the band's manager, "because that’s an opinion we really value, as that dude’s been with us from the get go. It was much more organic." Kyle Black acted as assistant engineer while Dawson provided additional engineering. Courtney Ballard, Will McCoy and Jeff Sontag did editing. On May 10, Gaskarth said the band was close to completing their next album. On May 16, the band revealed they had finished recording, having tracked 15 songs in total. The album was mixed by Neal Avron and mastered by Ted Jensen at Sterling Sound.

== Composition ==
=== Overview ===
Discussing the album's title, Gaskarth said "we were in a very transitional period when we made this record, so it’s kind of a reminder to ourselves to just get through it and press on." Gaskarth explained that with Don't Panic "a big part of the process was finding what made our band special on each of our past records. This time around, rather than taking influence from anything we were listening to at the time ... the goal was to make an album that we felt reflected the best aspects of our previous releases." Gaskarth called this "more of an introverted take on writing music". Gaskarth said there was a "big focus" in writing material that was "really open and relatable ... to people in a lot of different walks of life, and a lot of different stages of their lives."

Gaskarth said the band did not realize what the album's theme was until halfway into the album. Gaskarth said "a good chunk" of the album dealt with the band's time with Interscope Records and, "the other ... more important theme" of the album was "self discovery and confidence. It's about being sure that you're not sure, and being OK with that". In addition, Gaskarth said their experience with Interscope Records "catapulted us into this new mind-set... We were refocused to redefine All Time Low pretty heavily. It was almost like closing one book and starting another of where the band came from." Unlike Nothing Personal and Dirty Work where a lot of the material was co-written with various people, all of the songs on Don't Panic were written by Gaskarth with additional writing by Green. Gaskarth said that this approach "felt like it was the right time for us to flex our own muscle, and to show people what we’re capable of on our own."

=== Songs ===
According to Gaskarth, "The Reckless and the Brave" details "the day we decided to take a shot at signing to a major label for the first time, dropping everything, going on tour and opting out of going to college—taking that beaten path, I guess." "A Love Like War", alongside "Oh, Calamity!", was written in two days. When Barakat heard "A Love Like War" he felt the track was missing something. Dawson thought the track would sound good with back-and-forth vocals. It was suggested that Vic Fuentes of Pierce the Veil should feature on the track. Fuentes was sent a demo and subsequently tracked his vocals at his home studio. Barakat said that when he heard Fuentes' vocals on the track he "lost my shit. I thought it was the perfect collaboration."

Cassadee Pope of Hey Monday sings harmony on the choruses of "Backseat Serenade" and "So Long Soldier". Gaskarth considers "Somewhere in Neverland" a throwback to the time of the second album, So Wrong, It's Right (2007). Anthony Raneri of Bayside sings harmony throughout "So Long Soldier". "Outlines" was co-written with Stump and featured Jason Vena of Acceptance. Gaskarth said Vena's "part is a little more involved but that's just because his vocals lent themselves so well to that part in the song." "So Long, and Thanks for All the Booze" was written as a "big fuck you to some of the people from our past", according to Gaskarth. The album's sound has been described as pop punk and emo pop.

== Release ==
According to Gaskarth, the band toyed with the idea of self-releasing the album, "but one of the limitations that comes along with that is just not having a team there to work the music." He said the band take care of the performance aspect and "shouldn't have to worry about where it's being sold and how it's being marketed." They prefer to have control over the marketing, but would rather let another entity handle it. The band subsequently contacted a number of record labels to see who would be interested in signing them. Gaskarth said this was "a good situation" as it allowed them to "sit back and mull over a decision and make the decision that was absolutely, 100 percent what’s best for us." He went on to say that some bands need to make compromises when they're young, "as was the case [with] Interscope [Records] ... because that’s the only way you’ll get it done." However, the band were now "in [a] unique position where we were able to ask for exactly what we wanted and see who was willing to give [us] that." The group subsequently had discussions with a lot of people and labels. On May 28, the band posted an image on their website, which read "The Reckless and the Brave", alongside a countdown that was set to end on June 1. On June 1, a song with the name "The Reckless and the Brave" was made available for streaming and for free download.

The band were approached by independent label Hopeless Records, who had previously released the band's So Wrong, It's Right (2007) and Nothing Personal albums, with a "forward-thinking deal" that provided a "very equal-opportunity and beneficial situation for everyone". The band performed some shows with Green Day and Angels & Airwaves in Europe in June. From mid-June to early August, the band performed on the main stage at Warped Tour. A lyric video for "The Reckless and the Brave" was released on June 22. The band announced they had signed with Hopeless Records on July 3. In addition, they band revealed that their next album would be released in the fall. On that same day, "The Reckless and the Brave" was released as a single. On July 19, Barakat revealed that the album was mixed, mastered and had its track listing finalized. On August 9, Don't Panic was announced for release in October. Later that month, the band performed a few shows in the UK prior to their appearance at the Reading and Leeds Festivals. "For Baltimore" was premiered via Alternative Press on August 24. The track was released as a single on August 28. On the same day, a trailer for the album was posted online, and the album's track listing and artwork was revealed.

The artwork was designed by Brett Jubinville, who had previously created art designs for the band's tours. For the artwork, the group had a "end of the world" concept in mind, which they wanted to come across as unique and stand out. Gaskarth said Jubinville "killed it! He came up with all the ways the world could end happening at once." He also said it was a nod to the 2012 phenomenon. A lyric video was posted online for "For Baltimore" on the same day. On September 13, another trailer for the album was posted online. Further promotional videos were posted on September 16 and 17. Also on September 17, "Somewhere in Neverland" was released as a single. A day later, a lyric video was posted online for the song. This was followed by even more promotional videos between September 19 and 24. On September 27, "Outlines" was made available for streaming. On October 2, the album was made available for streaming on YouTube with accompanying lyrics, as well as animated visuals. The band then went on the Triptacular, a three-day event where the band performed in Tokyo, London and New York City between October 7 and October 9. Don't Panic was released on October 8. In October and November, the band went on The Rockshow at the End of the World Tour in the US, alongside the Summer Set, the Downtown Fiction, Hit the Lights and the Early November. During the tour, the band did in-store signings, as well as acoustic performances.

On October 18, a music video was released for "For Baltimore". In January 2013, the band went on a co-headlining North America tour with Yellowcard. In February, the band went on a tour of the UK with support from Lower Than Atlantis and the Summer Set. In February and March, the band performed at Soundwave festival in Australia. Alongside the festival, the band performed sideshows with Polar Bear Club and Chunk! No, Captain Chunk!. On March 19, a music video for "Somewhere in Neverland" was premiered by MTV. According to David Greenwald of MTV, the video "captures the band flying a hot-air balloon into space and through a magic cave, where they attempt to eat dinner with giant-size silverware." Later in March, the band went on a tour of Singapore and Japan. In April and May, the band went on the Spring Fever tour, a co-headlining North America tour with Pierce the Veil, with support from Mayday Parade and You Me at Six. On May 9, a music video was released for "Backseat Serenade", directed by Jeremy Rall. According to Rock Sound, the video features "arcades, dressing up and dogs". A behind-the-scenes video was posted online the following day. In late May, the band headlined the Slam Dunk festival in Leeds, Hatfield and Wolverhampton, followed by a support slot for Green Day in London on June 1. In August and September, the band went on a tour of Australia.

On August 30, it was announced that Don't Panic would be reissued later in the year under the name Don't Panic: It's Longer Now!. It included "A Love Like War" as well as three new songs and acoustic versions of other songs. "A Love Like War" was released as a single on September 2. In addition, a music video was released for the song. A clip of the track "Oh, Calamity!" was posted online on September 9. In September and October, the band supported A Day to Remember on the House Party tour in the US. In between dates on the tour, the band played a few headlining shows with The Wonder Years. Don't Panic: It's Longer Now! was made available for streaming on September 26, before being released on September 30, initially limited to 15,000 physical copies on CD. On October 5, a behind-the-scenes video of the band filming the "A Love Like War" video was posted online. In March 2014, the band went on a tour of the UK. From late March to early May, the band went on the A Love Like Tour in the US, with support from Man Overboard and Handguns. On May 14, a music video was released for "The Irony of Choking on a Lifesaver". It features footage of the band's show in London from earlier in the year.

== Reception ==
Professional ratings
Aggregate scores
Source	Rating
Metacritic	74/100
Review scores
Source	Rating
AbsolutePunk	90%
AllMusic	3.5/5 stars
Alter the Press!	4.5/5 stars
Alternative Press	4/5 stars
The Baltimore Sun	2/4 stars
FasterLouder	Mixed
Gigwise	Favorable
idobi	5/5 stars
Rock Sound	8/10

The album received positive reviews (with a Metacritic scoring of 74, indicating generally favorable reviews), with critics praising Gaskarth's song writing and the album's sound as a whole.

=== Commercial performance and accolades ===
Billboard reported that Don't Panic was projected to sell around 40,000 copies in the first week. The album eventually debuted at number 6 on the Billboard 200 with 48,000 copies in first week sales, making it the band's third top 10 debut in a row. The album also charted on a number of Billboard charts: number 1 on the Independent Albums chart, number 2 on the Tastemaker Albums chart, number 3 on the Alternative Albums chart, number 4 on the Top Rock Albums chart, and number 7 on the Digital Albums chart. In addition, the album reached number 9 in the UK, number 13 in Australia, number 18 in Canada, number 25 in Ireland, number 34 in the Netherlands, number 43 in Sweden, number 55 in Japan and number 65 in Belgium.

Don't Panic: It's Longer Now! charted at number 19 on the Billboard 200 with 13,505 first week copies sold. It charted on two other Billboard charts: number 1 on the Independent Albums chart, number 7 on both the Alternative Albums and Top Rock Albums charts, number 11 on the Digital Albums chart and number 14 on the Vinyl Albums chart. It also charted at number 56 in the UK. It has sold 170,000 copies in the United States as of April 2015. "For Baltimore" reached number 136 in the UK. "Somewhere in Neverland" reached number 111 in the UK. "Backseat Serenade" reached number 70 in Belgium. "A Love Like War" peaked at number 23 on the US Billboard Bubbling Under Hot 100 and number 17 on the Hot Rock Songs, number 56 in the UK and number 90 in Belgium.

Don't Panic was certified Silver by the BPI in January 2016. The RIAA certified "A Love Like War" Gold in October 2016. "A Love Like War" won the Song of the Year award at the 2014 Alternative Press Music Awards. The music video for "A Love Like War" was nominated for Best Video, and the song for Best Single, at the Kerrang! Awards.

== Track listing ==
All songs written by Alex Gaskarth, additional writing by Mike Green, and additional writing on "Outlines" by Patrick Stump.

No.	Title	Length
1.	"The Reckless and the Brave"	3:19
2.	"Backseat Serenade"	3:21
3.	"If These Sheets Were States"	3:19
4.	"Somewhere in Neverland"	3:45
5.	"So Long Soldier"	2:49
6.	"The Irony of Choking on a Lifesaver"	3:36
7.	"To Live and Let Go"	3:43
8.	"Outlines"	3:35
9.	"Thanks to You"	3:34
10.	"For Baltimore"	3:09
11.	"Paint You Wings"	3:40
12.	"So Long, and Thanks for All the Booze"	3:09
Total length:		40:58

Don't Panic: It's Longer Now! track listing
No.	Title	Length
1.	"The Reckless and the Brave"	3:19
2.	"A Love Like War" (featuring Vic Fuentes of Pierce the Veil)	3:33
3.	"Backseat Serenade"	3:21
4.	"Me Without You (All I Ever Wanted)"	3:33
5.	"If These Sheets Were States"	3:19
6.	"Somewhere in Neverland"	3:45
7.	"So Long Soldier"	2:49
8.	"Canals"	3:22
9.	"The Irony of Choking on a Lifesaver"	3:36
10.	"To Live and Let Go"	3:43
11.	"Outlines"	3:35
12.	"Thanks to You"	3:34
13.	"For Baltimore"	3:09
14.	"Paint You Wings"	3:40
15.	"So Long, and Thanks for All the Booze"	3:09
16.	"Oh, Calamity!"	3:46
17.	"For Baltimore" (acoustic)	3:29
18.	"Somewhere in Neverland" (acoustic)	3:40
19.	"The Reckless and the Brave" (acoustic)	3:37
20.	"Backseat Serenade" (acoustic)	3:14
Total length:		69:13

== Personnel ==
Personnel per digital booklet, except where noted.

All Time Low

- Alex Gaskarth – rhythm guitar, lead vocals
- Jack Barakat – lead guitar, backing vocals
- Zack Merrick – bass guitar, backing vocals
- Rian Dawson – drums, percussion

Additional musicians

- Cassadee Pope – additional vocals on "Backseat Serenade" and "So Long Soldier"
- Anthony Raneri – additional vocals on "So Long Soldier"
- Jason Vena – additional vocals on "Outlines"
- Vic Fuentes – guest vocals on "A Love Like War"
- Sean Mackin – violin on "Somewhere In Neverland" (acoustic) and "The Reckless and the Brave" (acoustic)

Production

- Mike Green – producer, recording
- Alex Gaskarth – co-producer
- Neal Avron – mixing
- Ted Jensen – mastering
- Kyle Black – assistant engineer
- Courtney Ballard, Will McCoy, Jeff Sontag – editing
- Rian Dawson – additional engineering
- Brett Jubinville – art direction, design

== Charts and certifications ==
=== Peak positions (original) ===
Chart (2012)	Peak position
Australian Albums (ARIA)	13
Austrian Albums (Ö3 Austria Top 40)	75
Belgian Albums (Ultratop Flanders)	65
Canadian Albums (Billboard)	18
Dutch Albums (Album Top 100)	34
Irish Albums (IRMA)	25
Japanese Albums (Oricon)	55
Scottish Albums (OCC)	7
Swedish Albums(Sverigetopplistan)	43
UK Albums (OCC)	9
UK Rock & Metal Albums (OCC)	2
US Billboard 200	6
US Billboard Alternative Albums	3
US Billboard Digital Albums	7
US Billboard Independent Albums	1
US Billboard Tastemaker Albums	2
US Billboard Top Rock Albums	4

=== Peak positions (reissue) ===
Chart (2013)	Peak position
US Billboard 200	19
US Billboard Alternative Albums	7
US Billboard Digital Albums	11
US Billboard Independent Albums	1
US Billboard Top Rock Albums	7
UK Albums Chart	56
Chart (2016)	Peak position
US Billboard Vinyl Albums	14

=== Certifications ===
Region	Certification	Certified units/sales
United Kingdom (BPI)	Silver	60,000^{‡}
^{‡} Sales+streaming figures based on certification alone.

== Release history ==
Country	Date	Format	Label
United Kingdom	October 8, 2012	Digital download, CD	Hopeless
Worldwide	October 9, 2012	Digital download	Hopeless
United States	October 9, 2012	Digital download, CD	Hopeless
Canada	October 9, 2012	Digital download, CD	Hopeless
Japan	October 9, 2012	Digital download	Hopeless
Japan	October 10, 2012	CD	Hopeless
Australia	October 9, 2012	Digital download	Hopeless
Australia	October 12, 2012	CD	Hopeless
