= I'm Not a Vampire =

2011 single by Falling in Reverse

Single by Falling in Reverse

from the album The Drug in Me Is You
- Released: October 24, 2011
- Label: Epitaph
- Songwriters: Ronald Radke; Michael 'Elvis' Baskette; David Holdredge
- Producer: Michael Baskette

Falling in Reverse singles chronology
| "The Drug in Me Is You" (2011) | "I'm Not a Vampire" (2011) | "Good Girls Bad Guys" (2011) |

Music video
- "I'm Not a Vampire" on YouTube

"I'm Not a Vampire" is the third single from the debut album, The Drug in Me Is You, of the band Falling in Reverse. Like other songs on the album, Ronnie Radke wrote the song while incarcerated for parole violation, before the formation of Falling in Reverse.

== Music video ==
The music video was released on October 24, 2011, and parodied Celebrity Rehab with Dr. Drew, with Ronnie Radke checking himself into the fictionalized rehab while performing the song. Some of the figures parodied in the video included socialite and heiress Paris Hilton, drummer Tommy Lee, and fictional supernatural serial killer Jason Voorhees. Additionally, internet personality Jeffree Star appeared as an extra, sporting pink hair and large hoop earrings, visible at the 2:25 mark of the video.

== Critical reception ==
Professional ratings
Review scores
| Source | Rating |
|---|---|
| Freakin' Awesome Network | 9/10 stars |
| Loudwire | 4/5 stars |

About "I'm Not a Vampire", Loudwire said "On the track, frontman Ronnie Radke belts out an appealing chorus that will burrow in your head and linger there as he sings, 'I'm insane / Well, I can feel it in my bones / Coursing through my veins / When did I become so cold? / For goodness sake / Where is my self-control? / If home is where my heart is / Then my heart has lost all hope.' The song is complete with heavy guitar riffs and a serious guitar solo, plus soaring synthesizers along with crushingly upbeat drum patterns. Radke's hasty deliverance of witty lyrics makes this song a treat, as well [...] One of the best and humorous parts of the song is when Radke cleverly sings 'Hi, my name is Ronnie / I'm an addict / Daddy should’ve never raised me on Black Sabbath.'"

== Revamped version ==
"I'm Not a Vampire (Revamped)"

Single by Falling in Reverse
- Released: February 12, 2021
- Recorded: 2020
- Genre: Symphonic rock; post-hardcore
- Length: 6:17
- Label: Epitaph
- Songwriters: Ronald Radke; Michael Elvis Baskette; Dave Holdredge; Sean Rooney
- Producers: Tyler Smyth; Ronnie Radke

Falling in Reverse singles chronology
| "Carry On" (2020) | "I'm Not a Vampire (Revamped)" (2021) | "Zombified" (2022) |

Music video
- "I'm Not a Vampire (Revamped)" on YouTube

On February 12, 2021, a "revamped" version accompanied by a cinematic music video, directed by Jensen Noen and featuring Ronnie Radke as a vampire and AEW wrestler Saraya Bevis (better known as former WWE star Paige), which was released. It features a full orchestra, choir and piano, and at the end of the music video, it features a tribute to guitarist Derek Jones. The new arrangement was composed by Irish composer Sean Rooney (The Drug in Me Is Reimagined). A full live chorus and various instruments were recorded in studio to further enhance the epic feel of the song. The track was produced by Tyler Smyth.

=== Charts ===
Chart performance for "I'm Not a Vampire (Revamped)"
| Chart (2021) | Peak position |
|---|---|
| US Hot Hard Rock Songs (Billboard) | 3 |

== Personnel ==
Credits adapted from Tidal and YouTube.

Falling in Reverse

- Ronnie Radke – lead vocals, songwriting, composer
- Jacky Vincent – lead guitar, backing vocals
- Derek Jones – rhythm guitar, backing vocals
- Nason Schoeffler – bass, backing vocals (uncredited performance)
- Scott Gee – drums, percussion, backing vocals (uncredited performance)
- Mika Horiuchi – bass, backing vocals (only appears in credits and music video)
- Ryan Seaman – drums, percussion, backing vocals (only appears in credits and music video)

Additional personnel

- Michael 'Elvis' Baskette – producer, songwriting, composer
- David Holdredge – mixing, engineer, songwriting, composer

=== Revamped personnel ===
Falling in Reverse

- Ronnie Radke – lead vocals, producer, programming

Additional personnel

- Tyler Smyth – producer
- Tony Maserati – mixing
- Sean Rooney – piano, composition
- Russell Jackson – additional vocals producer
- Michael "Elvis" Baskette – songwriting
- Dave Holdredge – songwriting

Additional musicians

- Sean Rooney – piano
- Chase Matthews – choir vocals
- Christopher Aaron – choir vocals
- Donna Taylor – choir vocals
- George Steeves – choir vocals
- Jackie Simley – choir vocals
- Jacob Lusk – choir vocals
- Kelly Jones – choir vocals
- Kym Foley – choir vocals
- Leah Williams – choir vocals
- Marcellina Hawthorne – choir vocals
- Mike Sandberg – choir vocals
- Mikel Cole – choir vocals
- Neeyah Lynn Rose – choir vocals
- Phillip Hunter – choir vocals
- Russell Jackson – choir vocals
- Sire James – choir vocals
- Terry Marcheta Nicholson – choir vocals
- Ronee Martin – choir vocals
- Vickie Dove – choir vocals
- Zuri – choir vocals

== Certifications ==
| Region | Certification | Certified units/sales |
|---|---|---|
| United Kingdom (BPI) | Silver | 200,000^{‡} |
^{‡} Sales+streaming figures based on certification alone.

== Awards ==
| Year | Award | Result | Place | Ref |
|---|---|---|---|---|
| 2011 | Loudwire Magazine's Cagematch Hall of Fame Award | Won | — | |
| 2011 | Revolver Magazine's The 10 Best Music Videos of 2011 | Won | 9th | |

== Release history ==
| Region | Date | Label | Format | Ref |
|---|---|---|---|---|
| Europe | June 25, 2011 | Epitaph | Digital | |
| United Kingdom | June 25, 2011 | Epitaph | Digital | |
