= The Reckless and the Brave =

Promotional single by All Time Low

from the album Don't Panic
- Released: June 1, 2012
- Length: 3:19
- Label: Hopeless
- Songwriter(s): Jack Barakat; Rian Dawson; Alex Gaskarth; Mike Green; Zack Merrick
- Producer(s): Alex Gaskarth; Mike Green

"The Reckless and the Brave" is a song by American rock band All Time Low from their fifth studio album Don't Panic. A lyric video was published on YouTube on June 30, 2012. It was released on June 1, 2012 through Hopeless Records as the album's lead single.
