= The Drug in Me Is You =

Studio album by Falling in Reverse
- Released: July 26, 2011
- Recorded: December 2010 – February 2011
- Studios: Paint It Black, Orlando, Florida
- Genres: Post-hardcore; emo; pop-punk; metalcore; glam metal; hard rock
- Length: 45:53
- Label: Epitaph
- Producer: Michael Baskette

Falling in Reverse chronology
The Drug in Me Is You (2011)	Fashionably Late (2013)

Singles from The Drug in Me Is You
- 1. "Raised by Wolves" Released: June 1, 2011; 2. "The Drug in Me Is You" Released: June 28, 2011; 3. "I'm Not a Vampire" Released: October 24, 2011; 4. "Good Girls, Bad Guys" Released: December 3, 2011; 5. "Pick Up the Phone" Released: December 10, 2011

The Drug in Me Is You is the debut studio album by American rock band Falling in Reverse. Production for the album took place following lead singer Ronnie Radke's departure from Escape the Fate in 2008. Recording took place in December 2010 and lasted until February 2011 at Paint it Black Studios in Orlando, Florida. Michael Baskette, who worked with Radke on Escape the Fate's Dying Is Your Latest Fashion, returned as the executive producer for the album, alongside former bandmate Omar Espinosa and others as additional composers and production aids in the studio. The Drug in Me Is You was released on July 25, 2011, in Europe and Japan, and on July 26, 2011, in the United States.

The album charted at number 19 on the US Billboard 200, selling 18,000 copies in its first week in the United States. It also charted internationally on the national album charts in Australia, Canada and the United Kingdom. By December 2019, the album was certified gold by the Recording Industry Association of America (RIAA). Upon release, The Drug in Me Is You received generally favorable reviews. Critics consistently noted the contrast between hardcore music and pop music on the tracks, but to mixed reception. Overall, the lyrics were viewed as being cliché while Radke's singing and return to making music were noted. In addition, critics focused on the bitter relationship between Radke and his former band, Escape the Fate, in which reviewers noticed the choice to attack the band in many of the album's tracks. The Drug in Me Is You was chosen by the Guitar World magazine as the album number 21 among the top 50 albums of 2011.

It is the only album that features founding bassist Nason Schoeffler and drummer Scott Gee.

== Background ==
In 2006, Ronnie Radke was involved in an altercation in Las Vegas that resulted in the fatal shooting of 18-year-old Michael Cook, eventually leading to Radke's two-year imprisonment for parole violation. Following his incarceration and forced departure from his old band, Escape the Fate, Radke formed Falling in Reverse with the help of longtime friend Nason Schoeffler, who found band members and visited Radke while he was in prison. However, Radke was unable to work with the band prior to his release on December 12, 2010. After going through a few bassists and drummers, the band prepared to record their full-length debut album. After the album finished production, bassist and founding member Nason Schoeffler and drummer Scott Gee left the band, making the album their only release with the band. Former Aiden, I Am Ghost, and The Bigger Lights drummer Ryan Seaman replaced Scott Gee and former Cellador member Mika Horiuchi took over bass for Schoeffler.

Originally conceived as a double album, the band's debut was originally going to contain one disc of post-hardcore and another with pop-punk. This was eventually scrapped in favor for a single album, soon confirmed to be titled The Drug in Me Is You. The band also confirmed that Radke's friend, Michael Baskette, who had previously worked on Blessthefall's album Witness and Escape the Fate's debut Dying Is Your Latest Fashion (which was also with Radke), would produce the album. Radke announced that the album would be released in 2011 by Epitaph Records, Radke's former label with Escape the Fate. The album was slated for a July 26, 2011 release date, with pre-orders scheduled for June 7.

== Recording and production ==
In December 2010, the band began composing songs together for the first time. They announced on December 20 that they would go to Orlando, Florida to record a full-length debut album over a period of two months with a tentative release date of the first quarter of 2011. The eleven song track list was released soon after. With the help of Executive Producer Michael "Elvis" Baskette, mixing and tracking for the album concluded on April 2, 2011. Speaking about working with Baskette as producer, Radke said, "The dude’s a genius, he really is. I don’t know if he’s under the radar or anything, but the guy knows what he’s doing. He’s a vocalist guy. That’s why me and him get along so well."

The Drug in Me Is You has been described as post-hardcore and pop punk. The songs also included synths, pop-choruses, and other sounds. Radke commented on the inclusion of different genres in songs, comparing different parts of the same song to the sounds of Norma Jean, Underoath, and Katy Perry. Lyrically, according to Radke, some of the songs on the album had tones of being arrogant, comparing the attitude to that commonly found in rap music. This is because Radke has cited Eminem as one of his major influences, so much so that he even included a beat made by Eminem and Dr. Dre during a breakdown on the track "Sink or Swim". In an interview, Radke's experiences were compared to Eminem's, noting that, "[Eminem] is someone who has been knocked down and knocked down, and he’s gotten back up again. Time and time again. And he’s triumphed." While the album itself was written during Radke's time in prison, he does not consider it a "Jailhouse record", though some songs that did not make the album do address a prison theme.

The lyrics for the album were all written by Radke during his imprisonment. He has often called the album a breakup record, but with a band and not a girl. Radke said that, "I would think all day, for days and days, [about] what people would want to hear. I would dissect my old album and read all the fan letters and the reasons why they loved my band and why they listened to it. And I wrote about that, but in different ways. I don’t know why these kids love the tragedies that I write about. I guess they can relate to it." Also on the writing process, Radke said that his lyrics were much more evolved than his past works and that he felt this was a high-point for the post-hardcore genre, owing success to being incarcerated and writing lyrics for two years with no other musical influences. The title, The Drug in Me Is You, came from Radke's experiences concerning his previous self-destructive behavior, which Radke explained that, "We named it that because ... It's me, looking in the mirror, saying, 'I am my own worst [enemy]. I do the worst damage to myself — more than anybody else can to do me.'"

Some things explored in the album were Radke's personal experiences, which include his mother, the corruption of Las Vegas, and his incarceration in prison due to multiple run-ins with the law involving narcotics and battery charges related to the death of Michael Cook. Radke stated that he chose not to write any songs about love because, "...I'm not going to lie ... and try to write songs on how much I love somebody. I do have love, but there will be a lot of songs about just what I’ve been through." Several songs focused on his departure from Escape the Fate after they kicked him out and replaced him with former Blessthefall singer Craig Mabbitt, with songs on the album that directly attacked both Mabbitt and Escape the Fate bassist Max Green. Prior to the album's release, Radke discussed what he intended to say about Escape the Fate on certain tracks, stating in an interview that he believed that the band's first album without Radke, This War Is Ours, was named after the conflict over Mabbitt taking over Radke's position in Escape the Fate. The band has since claimed it was not written about Radke, but he did not believe them.

== Singles and promotion ==
To promote the album, the band announced the dates for their first live performances, which would take place at the end of July following their debut album's release at certain locations in California, with one date scheduled in Texas on September 24, 2011. These shows were planned to be with supporting act Vampires Everywhere. However, the July dates were postponed due to issues with guitarist Jacky Vincent's immigration visa, though the band voiced intentions to make these dates up. This meant that the band's first live performances would be at the Vans Warped Tour 2011 from August 10 to 14 for five shows on the Advent Clothing Stage throughout the western United States. However, the band played a few secret shows under the name "Goodbye Graceful" on August eighth and ninth in Anaheim and Los Angeles. Following the release of the album and some Warped Tour 2011 appearances, the band announced their first headlining tour across the United States, with locations beginning in New Mexico, looping around the east coast, and concluding in Colorado. The tour will begin on September 18 and end on October 11, 2011, with support acts Eyes Set to Kill and For All Those Sleeping. The band's first supporting tour was to be a ten-show tour in November 2011 with headliners Black Veil Brides and supporting acts Aiden and Drive-A, but was canceled after Black Veil Brides dropped out when their lead vocalist Andy Biersack broke his nose. Emmure replaced Falling in Reverse on the second half of the Take A Picture, It Lasts Longer Tour with We Came as Romans and the band played an exclusive show at KROQ on November 8 to make up for the canceled shows.

The first single for the album, as well the band's first single overall, "Raised by Wolves", was released on June 10, 2011, to iTunes, though it had leaked a few weeks earlier on May 29. The track was featured on the iTunes Music Store as the "single of the week", and was available as a free download for that week. On June 21, the band released a 33-second preview of their second single, the eponymous track "The Drug in Me Is You". The full single was released three days later. The band's first music video was released for the track on June 28, and was advertised by The New York Post the week before the album's release. The album was streamed in its entirety by the band on their official website on July 15. The Drug in Me Is You was released commercially in the United States on July 26, 2011, and was promoted alongside other albums released that week including: Wu-Tang Clan's Legendary Weapons, Katherine Jenkins' From the Heart, All Shall Perish's This is Where It Ends, and others. The album's third single, "I'm Not a Vampire", was released on October 24 with an accompanying music video which features a satirical Celebrity Rehab theme, featuring Jeffree Star. On June 18, they released their fourth single, "Good Girls, Bad Guys" with an accompanying music video. Their fifth single, "Pick Up the Phone" was released on October 15, 2012, along with an iPhone 5 giveaway.

In celebration of the album becoming certified gold by the Recording Industry Association of America (RIAA), pre-order for the vinyl edition of the album was announced, which features two previously unreleased songs titled "You're Something Else" and "I'm Not a Hero". The vinyl edition was released on January 17, 2020. A reimagined version of the song, "The Drug in Me Is You", was also released on February 13, 2020, in celebration of the album's gold certification and as a gift to fans of Falling in Reverse.

In celebration of the album's 10th anniversary, Falling in Reverse released new The Drug in Me Is You merch for sale on their official website starting July 26, 2021.

== Composition ==
Musically, The Drug in Me Is You has been described as post-hardcore, emo, pop-punk, metalcore, glam metal, and hard rock.

== Critical reception ==
Professional ratings
Aggregate scores
Source	Rating
Metacritic	71/100
Review scores
Source	Rating
AllMusic	3/5 stars
Arts and Entertainment Playground	4/5 stars
Jam!	3.5/5 stars
Kill Your Stereo	2/5 stars
Live Music Insider	1/5 stars
PopMatters	5/10
Rock Sound	8/10 stars
The Weekender	3/5 stars

According to the review aggregator Metacritic, The Drug in Me Is You received "generally favorable reviews" based on a weighted average score of 71 out of 100 from 4 critic scores.

Alison Kopki of The Aquarian Weekly called the album, a "fun listen and decent starting-off point", and it "lets Radke get some things off his chest". The track-by-track breakdown noted the songs having "fast guitars, heavy drums and shred guitar solos". Kenneth E. Oquist of Arts and Entertainment Playground gave the album a four out of a possible five score overall. Oquist noted the mix of pop and hardcore, stating, "Hardcore and pop crashed together to become hardcore pop... Much like Nine Inch Nails created the genre industrial rock, Falling in Reverse has created a unique sound..." He gave a track-by-track review of the album, particularly emphasizing "Raised by Wolves", "I'm Not a Vampire", and "Caught Like a Fly". Things pointed out included: Michael Baskette's production, the band's instrumentation, and Radke's melodies. The writer noted the repeated attacks at Escape the Fate but disliked the album's lyrical quality. The resulting score was an 8.9 out of 10 possible, with the tracks "I'm Not a Vampire", "Good Girls Bad Guys", "Pick Up the Phone", all pop tracks, being pointed out as particularly good. A Weekender correspondent noted that the album includes: "Aggressive rock... metal and electronica into this collective mix of mayhem and definitely keeps listeners wondering what will come next." Different parts of songs were complimented, such as the "immense hooks... catchy choruses... [and] vicious breakdowns", as well as Radke's lyrics being called "witty and poetic". The correspondent's review further states, "Radke has managed to imprint his dramatic personality into every aspect of 'The Drug In Me Is You.'"

Conversely, AllMusic contributor Gregory Heaney gave the album an overall score of three out of a possible five, noting that the lyrics "feel more genuinely personal than his earlier work", and that "there's a real sense of urgent catharsis at work". He concludes, "[The] combination of a tight, talented band and a tortured frontman doesn't necessarily make Falling in Reverse a revelatory band, but it does make The Drug in Me Is You a very solid album." Molly Walter of The University Leader felt the album was an attempt to recreate Escape the Fate prior to Radke's departure and noted that "he fell short big time", calling the album's music "out of date and overdone". Walter did comment on Radke's singing but felt the lyrical content was conceited, concluding the review saying, "Face it, Ronnie, you did not magically turn tragedy into melody. You’re just not king of the music scene." The Jam! gives 3.5/5 stars to The Drug in Me Is You and said, "In a world of poseurs, Ronnie Radke is the real deal. The lewd, crude and tattooed punk has survived jail, rehab and being turfed from Escape the Fate. Now he’s on the loose and up to no good with a new band — and a CD of post-hardcore anthems that render his foul-mouthed tales of sex, drugs and rock ’n’ roll with a mix of metalcore power and pop-punk melody. Lock up everything."

Metalholic said "'I'm back...' I can't think of a more appropriate way to flow into the second track 'Tragic Magic.' Ronnie Radke is most definitely back and he is not afraid to tell you so. This fairly slow tempo song obviously takes a few jabs at Radke's former band Escape the Fate, but overall is a solid melodic song. The third track 'The Drug in Me is You' was the second single and the band's first video and might I add a very entertaining video. 'The Drug in Me is You,' is a nicely constructed musical performance that is just flat out catchy. To me the song is about something most people can relate to, the battle you have with yourself, with your morality, with your demons. We all know that we can be our own worst enemy and the only person that you truly have to blame in many instances is yourself. 'Trying to consume, the drug in me is you and I'm so high on misery can't you see,' evokes the feeling that you are your own drug, the creator of your misery and if you need to point fingers at someone try looking in the mirror first. "If we are born to die and we all die to live, then what’s the point of living life if life just contradicts? Questions we all ask when we pick ourselves up off the floor and do the only thing we can do, try again. Life is what you make of it, if you have lost yourself, it is up to you to find your way again. I got all profound there for a second, it happens."

== Commercial performance ==
The Drug in Me Is You was speculated by news source Perez Hilton to sell anywhere from 17,000 to 20,000 copies in the United States during its first week of sales, placing it close behind predicted debuting chart toppers Eric Church (Chief), Kelly Rowland (Here I Am), and Joss Stone (LP1). The album ended up selling 18,120 copies in its first week in the United States, charting at number 19 on the Billboard 200. This almost exactly matched the first week sales of Escape the Fate (2010), the third album by Radke's former band, though Escape the Fate only charted at number 25, six spots lower than The Drug in Me Is You, despite equal sales. In its second week on sales, The Drug in Me is You dropped about 70% in the United States, selling 5,870 copies. This dropped the album 60 spots to number 79 on the Billboard 200, and brought total US sales for the album to around 24,000 copies.

On the Billboard charts, The Drug in Me Is You charted at number two on the Top Hard Rock Albums chart, number three on the Top Alternative Albums and Top Rock Albums charts, number four on the Top Independent Albums chart, and number 12 on the Top Digital Albums chart, for a total of six appearances on the US Billboard charts, including the Billboard 200. Internationally, the album charted in the United Kingdom, peaking at number 125 on the national chart, as well as number four and number 17 on the UK Top 40 Rock Albums and Top Indie Albums charts, respectively. The album also peaked at number 21 on the Australian National Charts, and number 60 on the national Canadian Albums Chart.

In December 2019, the album was certified gold by the Recording Industry Association of America (RIAA) for combined sales and album-equivalent units of over 500,000 units.

== Track listing ==
All tracks are written and composed by Ronnie Radke, Michael 'Elvis' Baskette and David Holdredge except where noted.

No.	Title	Writer(s)	Length
1.	"Raised by Wolves"	Radke, Baskette, Holdredge, Bryan Ross	3:25
2.	"Tragic Magic"		4:06
3.	"The Drug in Me Is You"		3:39
4.	"I'm Not a Vampire"		3:52
5.	"Good Girls, Bad Guys"		3:15
6.	"Pick Up the Phone"		4:38
7.	"Don't Mess with Ouija Boards"	Radke, Baskette, Holdredge, Ross, Omar Espinosa	4:56
8.	"Sink or Swim"		4:45
9.	"Caught Like a Fly"		4:37
10.	"Goodbye Graceful"	Radke, Baskette, Ross, Espinosa	4:48
11.	"The Westerner"		3:52
Total length:			45:53

Alternate digital download and vinyl version
No.	Title	Writer(s)	Length
10.	"Goodbye Graceful" (alternate mix)	Radke, Baskette, Ross, Espinosa	4:56
11.	"The Westerner"		3:52
Total length:			46:01

Vinyl bonus tracks
No.	Title	Length
12.	"You're Something Else"	3:33
13.	"I'm Not a Hero"	3:50
Total length:		53:16

== Personnel ==
Credits for The Drug in Me Is You adapted from AllMusic.

Musicians

Falling in Reverse

- Ronnie Radke – lead vocals
- Jacky Vincent – lead guitar
- Derek Jones – rhythm guitar
- Ryan Seaman – drums, percussion (credit only; does not perform on the album)
- Mika Horiuchi – bass guitar (credit only; does not perform on the album)
- Nason Schoeffler – bass guitar (uncredited performance)
- Scott Gee – drums, percussion (uncredited performance)

Additional musicians

- Michael 'Elvis' Baskette – additional writing, keyboards, strings, additional vocals
- Trace Cyrus – additional writing, guitars, additional vocals, keys, percussion
- David Holdredge – additional writing, keyboards, strings, additional vocals
- Jeff Moll – additional vocals
- Bryan Ross – additional writing, guitars, drums
- Kevin Thomas – assistant engineer
- Omar Espinosa – additional writing on "Don't Mess With Ouija Boards" and "Goodbye Graceful"

Production

- Michael 'Elvis' Baskette – executive producer, recording, mixing, mastering, programming
- David Holdredge – mixing, programming, engineering
- Jeff Moll – digital editing
- Nick Pritchard – artwork, design
- Devin Taylor – photography
- Matt Grayson – photography

== Charts ==
=== Weekly charts ===
Chart (2011)	Peak position
Australian Albums (ARIA)	21
Canadian Albums (Billboard)	60
UK Albums (OCC)	125
UK Rock & Metal Albums Chart	4
UK Top 40 Albums	11
UK Top 40 Indie Albums	17
US Billboard 200	19
US Independent Albums (Billboard)	4
US Top Alternative Albums (Billboard)	3
US Top Hard Rock Albums (Billboard)	2
US Top Rock Albums (Billboard)	3
US Top Vinyl Albums (Billboard)	9

=== Year-end charts ===
Chart (2011)	Position
US Top Hard Rock Albums (Billboard)	47

== Certifications ==
Region	Certification	Certified units/sales
United Kingdom (BPI)	Silver	60,000^{‡}
United States (RIAA)	Gold	500,000^{‡}
^{‡} Sales+streaming figures based on certification alone.

== Release history ==
Region	Date	Label	Format	Catalog	Ref
European Union	July 25, 2011	Epitaph Records	CD, Digital download	B00564WML0	
Japan	July 25, 2011	Epitaph Records	CD, Digital download	271472	
United States	July 26, 2011	Epitaph Records	CD, Digital download	87147	
