= Alone (Falling in Reverse song) =

2013 single by Falling in Reverse

Single by Falling in Reverse

from the album Fashionably Late
- Released: May 7, 2013
- Recorded: June 2012–2013
- Genre: Rapcore; rap metal; electronica; metalcore; post-hardcore
- Label: Epitaph
- Songwriter: Ronald Radke
- Producer: Michael Baskette

Falling in Reverse singles chronology
"Pick Up the Phone" (2012)	"Alone" (2013)	"Fashionably Late" (2013)

Music video
- "Alone" on YouTube

"Alone" is a song by American rock band Falling in Reverse. It served as the lead single for the band's second studio album Fashionably Late.

== Music video ==
The music video contains the band performing while girls dance around them with shots of Radke in an electric blue Stacy Adams suit walking down an airport runway with a Ferrari 458 Italia driving beside him.

== Critical reception ==
The song was described by Zoiks! Online as, "Blending big radio beats with moshpit inducing riffage, the track addresses Ronnie's critics head-on." In a press statement, Radke stated that "Alone" was, "... Everything I've ever wanted to say to all these Twitter followers that talk shit... [and] I wanted to let everyone that dedicates their lives to just one genre of music know why they are so unhappy."

== Personnel ==
- Ronnie Radke – lead vocals
- Jacky Vincent – lead guitar
- Derek Jones – rhythm guitar, backing vocals
- Ryan Seaman – drums, percussion, backing vocals
- Ron Ficarro – bass, backing vocals

== Charts ==
Chart (2013)	Peak position
UK Rock & Metal (OCC)	14
US Hot Rock & Alternative Songs (Billboard)	27

== Accolades ==
Year	Award	Result	Ref
2014	Alternative Press Music Awards: Song of the Year	Nominated	
