= Re-Stitch These Wounds =

2020 studio album by Black Veil Brides

Studio album by Black Veil Brides
- Released: July 31, 2020
- Recorded: 2019
- Studios: Jake Pitts' Studio, Los Angeles, California
- Genre: Melodic metalcore
- Length: 41:37
- Label: Sumerian
- Producer: Jake Pitts

Black Veil Brides chronology
Vale (2018)	Re-Stitch These Wounds (2020)	The Phantom Tomorrow (2021)

Singles from Re-Stitch These Wounds
- 1. "Sweet Blasphemy" Released: June 26, 2020; 2. "Perfect Weapon" Released: July 17, 2020

Re-Stitch These Wounds is a studio album by American rock band Black Veil Brides, released through Sumerian Records on July 31, 2020. It is a re-recorded version of the band's first album, We Stitch These Wounds, to commemorate its 10th anniversary. Intended to be a "companion piece" to the first album rather than a "replacement", the band stated they "hope fans can enjoy and see the musical evolution of the band in a unique way." This is their first full-length studio album to feature Lonny Eagleton as bassist.

== Track listing ==
No.	Title	Writer(s)	Length
1.	"The Outcasts (Reborn)"	Andrew Biersack	0:30
2.	"We Stitch These Wounds"	Biersack, Chris Stewart, Jake Pitts, Black Veil Brides	3:58
3.	"Beautiful Remains"	Biersack, Pitts, Jeremy Ferguson, Black Veil Brides	4:14
4.	"Children Surrender"	Biersack, Pitts, Ferguson, Black Veil Brides	3:12
5.	"Perfect Weapon"	Biersack, Pitts, Ferguson, Black Veil Brides	4:07
6.	"Knives and Pens"	Biersack, Stewart, Black Veil Brides	4:16
7.	"The Mortician's Daughter (Overture III)"	Biersack, Jeremy Ferguson	3:30
8.	"All Your Hate"	Biersack, Pitts, Black Veil Brides	3:10
9.	"Heaven's Calling"	Biersack, Pitts, Ferguson, Black Veil Brides	3:18
10.	"Never Give In"	Biersack, Pitts, Ferguson, Black Veil Brides	3:51
11.	"Sweet Blasphemy"	Biersack, Pitts, Ferguson, Black Veil Brides	3:56
12.	"Carolyn"	Biersack, Pitts, Black Veil Brides	4:29
Total length:			41:37

== Personnel ==
=== Black Veil Brides ===
- Andy Biersack – lead vocals, piano
- Jake Pitts – lead guitar
- Jeremy "Jinxx" Ferguson – rhythm guitar, string arrangement, violin, cello, backing vocals
- Lonny Eagleton – bass, backing vocals
- Christian "CC" Coma – drums, percussion

=== Production ===
- Jake Pitts – production, engineering, digital editing, additional production, mixing

=== Artwork ===
- Luca Solo Macello – cover illustration

== Charts ==
Chart performance for Re-Stitch These Wounds
Chart (2020)	Peak positions
Uk Rock & Metal Albums (OCC)	10
