= Andy Biersack =

American singer (born 1990)

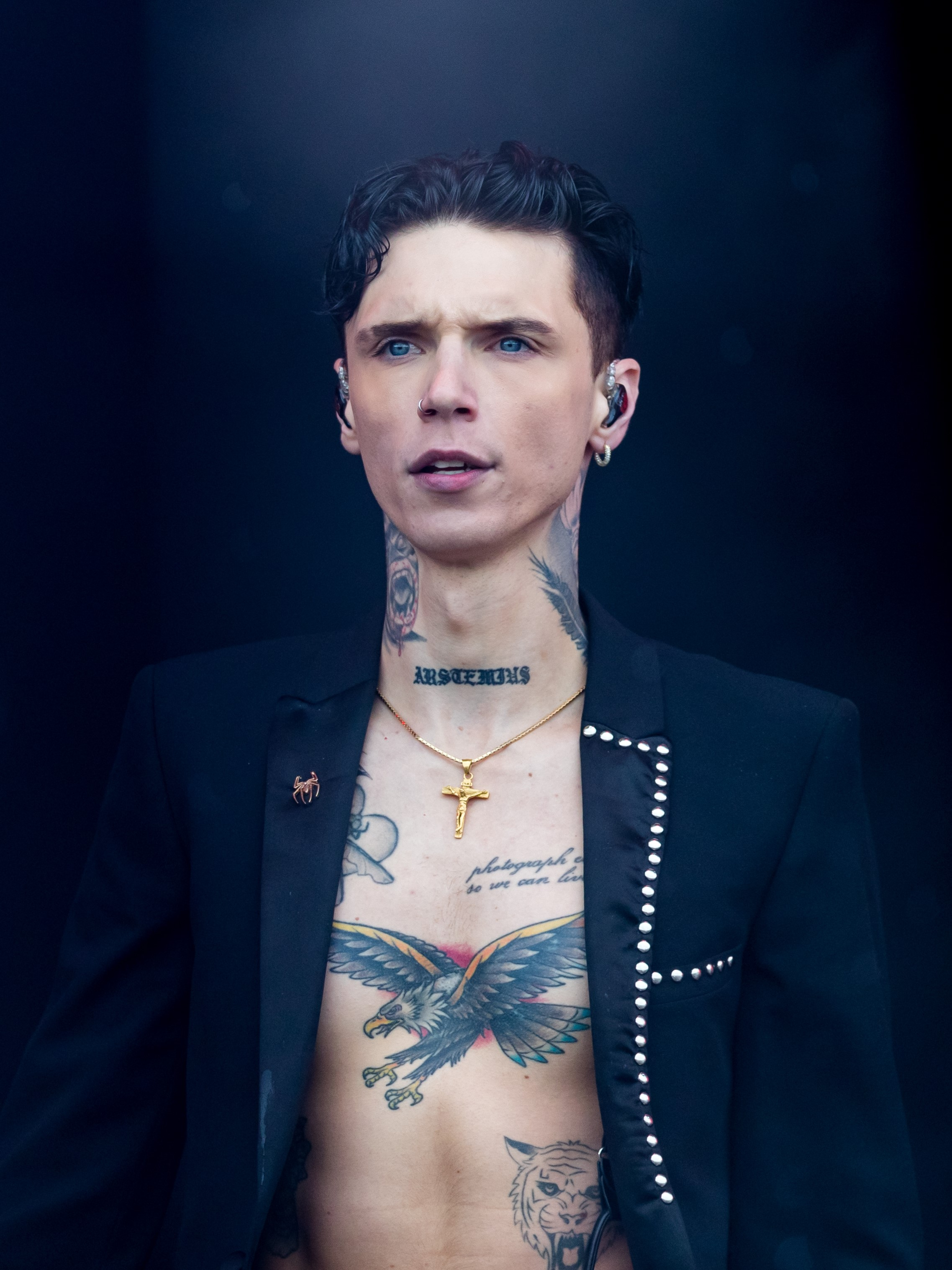
- Biersack in 2022

Background information
- Also known as: Andy Six; Andy Black
- Born: Andrew Dennis Biersack; December 26, 1990 (age 35); Cincinnati, Ohio, U.S.
- Genres: Glam metal; heavy metal; hard rock; post-hardcore; metalcore; alternative rock
- Occupations: Singer; musician; songwriter
- Instruments: Vocals; keyboards; synthesizers
- Years active: 2006–present
- Labels: Lava; Republic; Universal Republic; Standby
- Member of: Black Veil Brides

Andrew Dennis Biersack (born December 26, 1990), formerly known as Andy Six, is an American singer. He is the founder and lead vocalist of the rock band Black Veil Brides and is its only remaining original member. In 2014, he started a solo music project under the moniker Andy Black and released his debut album, The Shadow Side, in 2016.

== Early life and education ==
Biersack was born in Cincinnati, Ohio, to Chris and Amy Biersack.

For his early education, Biersack attended a Catholic elementary school, which he has spoken of in many interviews. Because of the way Biersack dressed and the music he listened to (i.e. Kiss, the Misfits, Avenged Sevenfold, the Damned, the Dropkick Murphys, etc.), he was the target of bullying at school. This bullying is reenacted in the "Knives and Pens" music video, performed by his band, Black Veil Brides.

For high school, Biersack attended Cincinnati's School for Creative and Performing Arts, and majored in drama and vocal music. Two days after he turned 18, he left school before graduating to move to Los Angeles in hopes of furthering his potential career.

== Career ==
=== Black Veil Brides ===
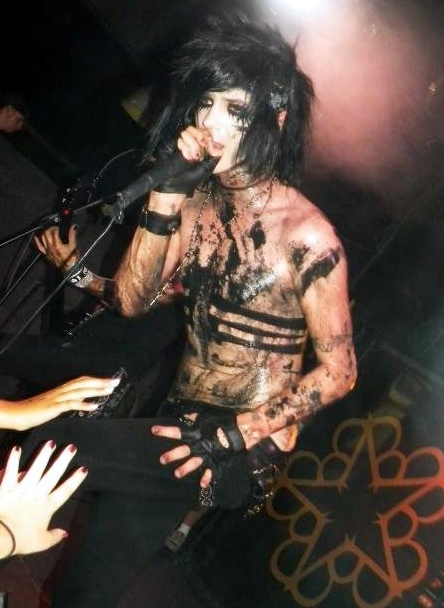
Biersack performing in 2011

At age 14, Andy Biersack and a few of his friends formed their first band, called "Biersack" (although they only played one show). This project eventually grew into what would later be known as Black Veil Brides.

In September 2009, Black Veil Brides signed with the independent label StandBy Records. The writing process for a tour and a record began immediately.

In 2009, they also released their first music video for "Knives and Pens", which to date has garnered over 200 million views. The band embarked on their first US tour, titled "On Leather Wings". Their debut album, We Stitch These Wounds, was released July 20, 2010 and sold over 13,000 copies in its first week, ranking at No. 36 on the Billboard Top 200 chart and No. 1 on the Billboard Independent chart. The band's second studio album, Set the World on Fire, was released on June 14, 2011, through Lava Music/Universal Republic Records.

The band's third album, Wretched and Divine: The Story of the Wild Ones, was released on January 8, 2013. Their fourth self-titled album was released on October 27, 2014. Their fifth album Vale was released January 12, 2018. In celebration of the 10th anniversary of their first album We Stitch These Wounds, a re-recording of the album titled Re-Stitch These Wounds was released on July 31, 2020, followed their sixth album The Phantom Tomorrow on October 29, 2021.

=== Andy Black ===
In May 2014, Biersack revealed to Kerrang! magazine that he had been working on new music outside Black Veil Brides under the moniker 'Andy Black'. He explained that his solo project will have a radically different sound compared to the band, and that he felt he couldn't create that sound within the band, thus deciding to take it on as a solo artist. Andy's inspiration for this project was his love for '80s synth and goth music. He will be working with former Black Veil Brides producer John Feldmann. Despite this project, he reassured his fans that this does not mean this is his primary focus, but rather more of a hobby or a side-project. On May 19, 2014, he premiered his first song, titled "They Don't Need to Understand", online with a music video via Hot Topic.

On March 17, 2016, Biersack announced the title of his first Andy Black album The Shadow Side, scheduled to be released on May 6, 2016. The lead single from the project, "We Don't Have to Dance" was released on March 18, 2016, with a music video for the song being released on March 21.

On February 15, 2019, Biersack announced his second album, The Ghost of Ohio, which was released on April 12, 2019. The album's lead single, "Westwood Road" was released the same day.

== Other media ==
After his move to Los Angeles, he took up acting for a short time. He had a small part in the AT&T commercial "Confetti", as well as a 30-second spot in the Montana Meth commercial "Jumped". Biersack guest stars in the Funny or Die web series Average Joe on YouTube. He also starred in the Black Veil Brides full-length feature film, Legion of the Black, which was released on January 6, 2013, to support the band's third album.

In February 2016, Biersack was cast to play the role of Johnny Faust in the independent supernatural thriller film American Satan alongside Asking Alexandria member Ben Bruce. The film, directed by Sumerian Records founder Ash Avildsen, was released on October 13, 2017.

Biersack authored the supernatural, historical fiction graphic novel Ghost of Ohio, in collaboration with Z2 Comics. The graphic novel was released on April 19, 2019, as a tie-in to the album The Ghost of Ohio.

Biersack wrote They Don't Need to Understand: Stories of Hope, Fear, Family, Life, and Never Giving In with longtime journalist Ryan J. Downey, which arrived in December 2020.

From 2020 to 2021, Biersack voiced Batman in a web-series adaptation of the DC Comics mini-series Dark Nights: Death Metal.

== Personal life ==
Biersack's stage name was "Andy Six" up until around 2011 when he decided that he preferred to be called by his birth name, Andy Biersack.

In an interview with Loudwire in 2012, Biersack said, "I'm not a religious person but I grew up in a religious family. I went to the funeral for my grandfather, a person that I love very much, and everyone is speaking about how he went to Heaven and how he's in Heaven. I always fight with that, because I would love nothing more to believe that my grandfather is in the clouds playing "Xbox 460" [sic] or whatever awesome stuff they have up in Heaven, but I can't."

Biersack is a fan of comic books, he has listed comics such as Batman: Knightfall, V for Vendetta, Batman: Hush, and Kingdom Come as favorites. Biersack is also a lifelong fan of the Cincinnati Bengals.

On October 30, 2016, Biersack was involved in a physical altercation with his wife, Juliet Simms, on a flight back to Los Angeles. According to the video testimony given by adult film actress Mary Carey, a witness to the incident, Simms forcibly struck Biersack in the face twice. Carey also stated Simms struck herself in the face with the airline handcuffs until her nose began to bleed, alleging that she was defending herself against Biersack. In a video recorded by another passenger, Simms accused Biersack of breaking her ribs. Witnesses on the plane state Biersack did not lay a hand on Simms. Following the incident, both released statements about the effects of alcohol and confirming that they did not separate after the incident.

=== Stage injuries ===
Biersack has suffered multiple injuries while performing with Black Veil Brides, most notably his fall from a 15-foot (4.6 m) pillar on June 18, 2011, in Hollywood. In an attempt to jump back onto the stage, he fell forward and hit his ribcage, knees and skull on the edge, which resulted in three ribs shattered, and one displaced. That particular injury caused Black Veil Brides to have to miss the first week of the Vans Warped Tour in 2011. On October 26, 2011, while on another tour in the UK, Biersack broke his nose on the drum riser while performing a gig in Luxembourg, resulting in more missed tour dates. However, two days later, he performed with Black Veil Brides in London.

In an interview with Revolver magazine in 2011, Biersack stated:

I never anticipated seeing 40. I smoke two packs a day and drink like a camel. I just don't really think about death. I know I'm gonna die one day, but if I can achieve all of my goals and live exactly the way I want to before then, I'll have no regrets when I die. I don't try to hurt myself like Iggy Pop or Marilyn Manson or anything – it's just the byproduct of the chaos of being on stage.

== Discography ==
Andy Biersack discography
- Studio albums: 8
- Singles: 2
- Collaborations: 1

=== As Andy Black ===
==== Studio albums ====
Title	Details	Peak chart positions	
Title	Details	US	AUS
The Shadow Side	Released: May 6, 2016; Label: Republic, Lava; Formats: Digital download, CD	22	23
The Ghost of Ohio	Released: April 12, 2019; Label: Republic, Lava; Formats: Digital download, CD	200	—

==== Singles ====
Song	Year	Peak chart positions	Album
Song	Year	US Rock	Album
"They Don't Need to Understand"	2014	—	Non-album single
"We Don't Have to Dance"	2016	23	The Shadow Side
"My Way"	2018	—	Non-album single
"—" denotes the single failed to chart or was not released.

===== As featured artist =====
Song	Year	Artist	Album
"Asshole"	2014	Ronnie Radke	Watch Me – Mixtape
"The End of Us"	2025	TX2	End of Us

==== Non-album tracks ====
Title	Year	Album
"21 Guns"	2016	Kerrang!'s Green Day American Superhits
"Beyond My Reach"	2017	Warped Tour's 2017 Compilation
"When We Were Young" (featuring Juliet Simms)	2017	Punk Goes Pop Vol. 7
"My Way"(Frank Sinatra cover)	2018	Non-album single

=== With Black Veil Brides ===
- We Stitch These Wounds (2010)
- Set the World on Fire (2011)
- Wretched and Divine: The Story of the Wild Ones (2013)
- Black Veil Brides (2014)
- Vale (2018)
- The Phantom Tomorrow (2021)
- Vindicate (2026)

== Filmography ==
=== Film ===
Title	Year	Role
American Satan	2017	Johnny Faust
Boogeyman	2026	Bruce

=== Television ===
Title	Year	Role
Paradise City	2021–present	Johnny Faust

=== Music videos ===
Song	Year	Album	Director	Views on YouTube
"They Don't Need to Understand"	2014	Non-album single	Patrick Fogarty	24.000.000
"We Don't Have to Dance"	2016	The Shadow Side	Patrick Fogarty	47.000.000
"Ribcage"	2016	The Shadow Side	Dan Sturgess	12.000.000
"My Way"	2018	Non-album single	Patrick Fogarty	1.500.000
"Westwood Road"	2019	The Ghost of Ohio	NYLA Projects	2.500.000
"Ghost of Ohio"	2019	The Ghost of Ohio	Patrick Fogarty	1.100.000

== Accolades ==
Year	Nominated work	Award	Result	Place
2011	Andy Biersack	Revolver Magazine's 100 Greatest Living Rock Stars 2011	Won	—
2012	Andy Biersack	Revolver Magazine's Golden God Awards: Best Vocalist 2012	Nominated	—
2012	Andy Biersack	Kerrang! Award for Hottest Male 2012	Nominated	—
2012	Andy Biersack	Kerrang!'s 50 Greatest Rock Stars in the World Today	Won	4th
2014	Andy Biersack	Kerrang! Award for Hottest Male 2014	Won	
2017	The Shadow Side	Alternative Press Music Awards Album of the Year	Nominated	
2017	“We Don't Have to Dance”	Alternative Press Music Awards Song of the Year	Won	
"—" denotes a nomination that did not place or places were not relevant in the award.
