= The Ghost of Ohio =

Studio album by Andy Black
- Released: April 12, 2019
- Genre: Rock
- Length: 40:09
- Label: Lava; Republic
- Producer: John Feldmann

Andy Black chronology
| The Shadow Side (2016) | The Ghost of Ohio (2019) |

Singles from The Ghost of Ohio
- 1. "Westwood Road" Released: February 15, 2019

The Ghost of Ohio is the second studio album by American singer Andy Black. It was released on April 12, 2019, on Lava and Republic Records.

The album was released on April 12, 2019, the same day as its lead single, "Westwood Road". Loudwire named it one of the 50 best rock albums of 2019.

== Track listing ==
| No. | Title | Length |
|---|---|---|
| 1. | "Introduction: Resurrection" | 2:28 |
| 2. | "The Promise" | 3:33 |
| 3. | "Westwood Road" | 3:02 |
| 4. | "Know One" | 2:40 |
| 5. | "Soul Like Me" | 3:28 |
| 6. | "The Wind & Spark" | 3:33 |
| 7. | "Ghost of Ohio" | 3:25 |
| 8. | "Heroes We Were" | 4:18 |
| 9. | "Feast or Famine" | 3:42 |
| 10. | "Heaven" | 3:41 |
| 11. | "The Martyr" | 2:47 |
| 12. | "Fire in My Mind" | 3:32 |
| Total length: | | 40:09 |

== Charts ==
| Chart (2019) | Peak position |
|---|---|
| US Billboard 200 | 200 |
| US Top Alternative Albums (Billboard) | 17 |
| US Top Rock Albums (Billboard) | 44 |
