= We Don't Have to Dance =

Single by Andy Black

from the album The Shadow Side
- Released: March 18, 2016
- Genre: Rock
- Length: 3:14
- Label: Lava; Republic
- Songwriters: Andy Biersack; John Feldmann; Patrick Stump; Quinn Allman; Zakk Cervini; Matt Pauling; Ricky Reed
- Producers: Ricky Reed; John Feldmann

Andy Black singles chronology
"They Don't Need to Understand" (2014)	"We Don't Have to Dance" (2016)	"Ribcage" (2016)

"We Don't Have to Dance" is a song by American singer Andy Black. It was released as the first single from his debut studio album, The Shadow Side, on March 18, 2016. The music video for the song directed by Patrick Fogarty was also released three days later. It charted on multiple Billboard charts, peaking number 23 on the Billboard Hot Rock Songs chart.

== Writing and composition ==
"We Don't Have to Dance" was produced by Ricky Reed and John Feldmann. The song is described as a "upbeat, dance-able" song and Black's "departure" from the musical style of Black Veil Brides. Black described the song as "poppier than his work with Black Veil Brides". The song's lyrics are about social anxiety, loathing social events and hatred of small talk. The song was written by Black and his team of writers in collaboration with Fall Out Boy vocalist Patrick Stump and former The Used guitarist Quinn Allman. On writing with Stump, Black said that it was "very simple in that we just sat and talked about things that we mutually hated for like a half an hour and then we just put them in a list and that is the lyrics to the song.”

== Release ==
On March 9, 2016, a 15-second teaser for "We Don't Have to Dance" was released. A week later, the title for Black's debut album was confirmed to be titled as The Shadow Side and would be released on May 6. The song was released as the first single to the album on March 18, alongside a music video released three days later. The song was the official theme song for WWE pay-per-view event Payback and is included in the video game WWE 2K17. At the 2017 Alternative Press Music Awards, it was named "Song of the Year".

== Music video ==
The music video of the song was released on March 21, 2016 and was directed by Patrick Fogarty. The video is in black and white and is described as "eerie" with "vintage horror film aesthetic".

== Chart performance ==
Chart (2016)	Peak position
Poland Airplay (ZPAV)	11
US Alternative Digital Songs (Billboard)	16
US Hot Rock Songs (Billboard)	23
US Rock Digital Songs (Billboard)	16
