= The Phantom Tomorrow =

Studio album by Black Veil Brides
- Released: October 29, 2021
- Recorded: 2020
- Genre: Hard rock
- Length: 41:15
- Label: Sumerian
- Producers: Erik Ron; Jake Pitts

Black Veil Brides chronology
Re-Stitch These Wounds (2020)	The Phantom Tomorrow (2021)	The Mourning (2022)

Singles from The Phantom Tomorrow
- 1. "Scarlet Cross" Released: November 13, 2020; 2. "Fields of Bone" Released: April 12, 2021; 3. "Crimson Skies" Released: June 3, 2021; 4. "Torch" Released: August 13, 2021; 5. "Born Again" Released: May 13, 2022

The Phantom Tomorrow is the sixth studio album by American rock band Black Veil Brides, released on October 29, 2021, through Sumerian Records. It is a rock opera concept album, similar to previous releases Wretched and Divine: The Story of the Wild Ones and Vale.

== Background ==
On August 2, 2020, following the live stream show which celebrated the re-recording of We Stitch These Wounds, Jeremy "Jinxx" Ferguson had confirmed that they are working on a new album during the COVID-19 pandemic, stating in an interview with Myglobalmind:

We have been writing up a storm. I can't talk too about what we envision for the next album, but we are revisiting the idea of another concept record like we did with Wretched and Divine. It would be fun to do another concept CD, but we'll see how things pan out. We have six solid songs written, and we are still writing. Once we do this show, we will head back into the studio to write some more. We have been doing it all ourselves. Jake will be producing it, and we are tracking vocals and guitars at his studio. I'm recording the strings at my studio. With COVID going on, we have all been quarantined and working at home, but when we do get together, it's just us and maybe our wives. When we are all in the same room bouncing ideas off each other, it's a never-ending flood of inspiration and ideas. I'm excited for fans to hear what we are coming up with.

On November 11, 2020, the band announced The Phantom Tomorrow in an interview with Kerrang!. The first single, "Scarlet Cross", was released November 13. On April 12, 2021, the second single, "Fields of Bone" was released along with the album artwork, track listing, and preorder details. It was soon followed up with "Crimson Skies", released with an animated lyric video on June 3. The fourth single, "Torch", was released with a music video on August 13. On May 13, 2022, the band released the music video to the song "Born Again".

== Track listing ==
The Phantom Tomorrow track listing
No.	Title	Writer(s)	Length
1.	"The Phantom Tomorrow (Introduction)"	Andy Black, Pitts, Jinxx	1:33
2.	"Scarlet Cross"	Black, Pitts, Erik Ron	3:37
3.	"Born Again"	Black, Pitts, Ron	3:39
4.	"Blackbird"	Black, Pitts, Jinxx, Erik Ron	3:21
5.	"Spectres (Interlude)"	Jinxx	1:12
6.	"Torch"	Black, Pitts, Jinxx, Ron	3:37
7.	"The Wicked One"	Black, Pitts, Jinxx, Ron	3:35
8.	"Shadows Rise"	Black, Pitts, Jinxx, Ron	4:56
9.	"Fields of Bone"	Black, Pitts, Jinxx, Ron	3:19
10.	"Crimson Skies"	Black, Pitts, Jinxx, Ron	4:09
11.	"Kill the Hero"	Black, Pitts, Jinxx, Christian 'CC' Coma, Ron, Blair Daly, Zac Maloy	3:28
12.	"Fall Eternal"	Black, Pitts, Jinxx, Ron	4:49
Total length:			41:15

== Personnel ==
Credits adapted from Discogs.

Black Veil Brides

- Andy Biersack – lead vocals
- Jake Pitts – lead guitar
- Jinxx – rhythm guitar, backing vocals
- Lonny Eagleton – bass, backing vocals
- Christian "CC" Coma – drums, percussion

Additional personnel

- Anthony Reeder – engineer
- Erik Ron – engineer, mixing, producer
- Ted Jensen – mastering

== Charts ==
Chart performance for The Phantom Tomorrow
Chart (2021)	Peak position
German Albums (Offizielle Top 100)	77
Scottish Albums (Official Charts)	43
UK Albums Sales (OCC)	28
UK Independent Albums (Official Charts)	8
UK Rock & Metal Albums (Official Charts)	6
US Billboard 200	176
