= The Shadow Side =

Studio album by Andy Black
- Released: May 6, 2016
- Recorded: 2015–2016
- Studios: Foxy Studios (Woodland Hills, California)
- Genres: Pop rock; pop-punk; alternative pop; synth-pop; synth-punk; alternative rock
- Length: 49:26
- Labels: Lava; Republic
- Producers: John Feldmann; Ricky Reed

Andy Black chronology
The Shadow Side (2016)	The Ghost of Ohio (2019)

Singles from The Shadow Side
- 1. "We Don't Have to Dance" Released: March 18, 2016

The Shadow Side is the debut solo album by Black Veil Brides frontman Andy Black. It was released on May 6, 2016, on Lava and Republic Records.

The album was produced by John Feldmann and marked a departure of Black's alternative metal musical style as the frontman of Black Veil Brides in exchange for more pop influences. It features guest performances from Quinn Allman, Rian Dawson, Ashton Irwin, Juliet Simms, Matt Skiba, and Gerard and Mikey Way.

== Background and production ==
Black Veil Brides frontman Andy Biersack debuted his solo pseudonym project under the name Andy Black with the song "They Don't Need to Understand" releasing in May 2014. Black began to record the album in August 2015 alongside producer John Feldmann. Throughout the recording process, Black often teased the upcoming album on social media with images of Black alongside well known rock musicians including Patrick Stump and Gerard Way.

In an interview with Kerrang!, Black commented on the musical style of the album.

"I think my intention for this was to go as far in the other direction as possible. Sonically, the goal was to really play with music and a lot of different stuff, to have a lot of odd instrumentation and to have a lot of programmed stuff, keyboards and more classic, almost pop-rock guitar."

While Black was recording the album, he also intended to record the next Black Veil Brides album, later resulting in writing about 45 songs for the solo project.

== Reception ==
Professional ratings
Aggregate scores
Source	Rating
Metacritic	83/100
Review scores
Source	Rating
Alternative Press	4/5 stars
Kerrang!	4/5
Paste	7.9/10
Rock Sound	8/10

The Shadow Side has received highly favorable reviews from music critics. It holds an average score of 83/100 on Metacritic, indicating "universal acclaim". Rock Sound described the album as being "full of bombastic alt-pop". Alternative Press writer Ryan Downey commented that Black "chases his dark muse against a cinematic backdrop of impressive pop 'n' roll on The Shadow Side", also writing that Black sounded "confidently in charge" despite the large number of collaborations with known rock artists on the album. At the 2017 Alternative Press Music Awards, The Shadow Side was nominated for "Album of the Year", and lead single "We Don't Have to Dance" was awarded "Song of the Year".

== Track listing ==
No.	Title	Writer(s)	Length
1.	"Homecoming King"	Zakk Cervini; Matt Pauling; Andy Biersack; John Feldmann; Simon Wilcox	4:56
2.	"We Don't Have to Dance"	Biersack; Feldmann; Patrick Stump; Quinn Allman; Cervini; Pauling; Ricky Reed	3:14
3.	"Ribcage"	Cervini; Pauling; Biersack; Feldmann; Allman; Wilcox	3:51
4.	"Stay Alive" (featuring Matt Skiba)	Cervini; Pauling; Biersack; Feldmann	4:08
5.	"Love Was Made to Break"	Cervini; Pauling; Biersack; Feldmann; Joel Madden; Benji Madden	3:25
6.	"Beautiful Pain"	Biersack; Feldmann; Cervini; Pauling	3:33
7.	"Put the Gun Down"	Cervini; Pauling; Biersack; Feldmann; Emily Warren	3:46
8.	"Drown Me Out"	Biersack; Feldmann; Bonnie McKee; Sarah Hudson; Ashton Irwin	2:52
9.	"Paint It Black"	Cervini; Pauling; Biersack; Feldmann; Scott Stevens	4:13
10.	"Break Your Halo"	Cervini; Pauling; Biersack; Feldmann; B. Madden	3:31
11.	"Louder Than Your Love"	Pauling; Cervini; Biersack; Feldmann; Gerard Way	3:31
12.	"Broken Pieces"	Biersack; J. Madden; B. Madden; Feldmann; Allman	3:36
13.	"The Void"	Cervini; Pauling; Biersack; Feldmann; McKee; Hudson	4:50
Total length:			49:26

== Personnel ==
Adapted from album booklet notes

Musicians

- Andy Black – primary artist
- John Feldmann – backing vocals; keyboards (tracks 1–3, 10 and 11); guitar (tracks 1 and 2)
- Zakk Cervini – guitar; keyboards (tracks 1–3, 5–8 and 10–13); bass guitar (tracks 1–4, 9 and 12)
- Matt Pauling – guitar; keyboards (tracks 1, 3, 5–8 and 10–13); bass guitar (tracks 1, 7 and 13)
- Peter "JR" Wasilewski – horn (tracks 1 and 13)
- Simon Wilcox – backing vocals (track 1)
- Juliet Simms – backing vocals (tracks 1, 3, 8 and 13)
- Ashton Irwin – drums (tracks 1–4, 6 and 12)
- Ricky Reed – guitar, programming, synthesizer (track 2)
- Mikey Way – bass guitar (tracks 2 and 11)
- Quinn Allman – guitar (tracks 2, 3 and 12); keyboards (track 12)
- Matt Skiba – guest vocals (track 4)
- Rian Dawson – drums (tracks 7–9 and 13)
- Dean Butterworth – drums (track 11)
- Gerard Way – backing vocals (track 11)

Production

- John Feldmann – production, additional mixing
- Ricky Reed – production (track 2)
- Zakk Cervini – mixing, engineering
- Matt Pauling – engineering
- Manny Marroquin – mixing (track 2)
- Ethan Shumaker – engineering (track 2)
- A&R – Ryan Silva

== Charts ==
Chart (2016)	Peak position
Australian Albums (ARIA)	23
Austrian Albums (Ö3 Austria)	62
Belgian Albums (Ultratop Flanders)	85
Belgian Albums (Ultratop Wallonia)	182
Canadian Albums (Billboard)	33
Italian Albums (FIMI)	99
New Zealand Albums (RMNZ)	33
Spanish Albums (Promusicae)	66
Swiss Albums (Schweizer Hitparade)	75
UK Albums (Official Charts)	16
US Billboard 200	22
