= Fashionably Late (song) =

2013 single by Falling in Reverse

Single by Falling in Reverse

from the album Fashionably Late
- Released: May 20, 2013
- Recorded: June 2012–2013
- Genre: Pop-punk; pop rock
- Label: Epitaph
- Songwriter: Ronald Radke
- Producer: Michael Baskette

Falling in Reverse singles chronology
| "Alone" (2013) | "Fashionably Late" (2013) | "Born to Lead" (2013) |

Music video
- "Fashionably Late" on YouTube

"Fashionably Late" is the second single from American rock band Falling in Reverse's second album, Fashionably Late.

== Background ==
"Fashionably Late", was released on May 21, 2013. The lyric video of the song had more than 200,000 views after the first day of release on YouTube.

The single "Fashionably Late" was in second place as the most viral song in world between May 20 to May 26. The single was also in the position 46 of the Billboard Rock Songs.

== Critical reception ==
Under the Gun said "Like most of the group’s catalog the song offers numerous tongue-in-cheek lyrics thrown together against a melody that’s too catchy for its own good. It’s the kind of well-structured song that gets stuck in your mind". Metalholic: "'Fashionably Late' is at the opposite end of the spectrum compared to 'Alone'. Where 'Alone' has rapping and is intense and angry 'Fashionably Late' is upbeat, completely easy-going and has a more pop rock vibe to it".

== Personnel ==
- Ronnie Radke – lead vocals
- Jacky Vincent – lead guitar
- Derek Jones – rhythm guitar, backing vocals
- Ryan Seaman – drums, percussion, backing vocals
- Ron Ficarro – bass, backing vocals

== Charts ==
| Chart (2013) | Peak position |
|---|---|
| US Hot Rock & Alternative Songs (Billboard) | 46 |
