= Star X Speed Story =

Studio album by Jacky Vincent
- Released: 2013
- Genre: Heavy metal, hard rock
- Length: 53:52
- Label: Shrapnel Records
- Producer: Mike Varney

Star X Speed Story is the debut solo album by guitarist Jacky Vincent. The album was released in 2013 through Shrapnel Records and consists of 13 songs. Additional instrumentation was provided by fellow (now former) Falling in Reverse members, Ryan Seaman (drums) and Ron Ficarro (bass).

== Track listing ==
All songs composed by Jacky Vincent.

No.	Title	Length
1.	"Maybe I Am a Wolf"	2:49
2.	"Venom Love"	3:25
3.	"Star X Speed (featuring Michael Angelo Batio)"	4:19
4.	"Without You"	4:05
5.	"Heaven Or Hell (featuring Paul Gilbert)"	5:02
6.	"Neo Concerto"	3:44
7.	"If You Were Mine"	4:59
8.	"Runaway Tryst"	3:47
9.	"The Tempest"	1:23
10.	"Fatal Envy"	3:47
11.	"Burning Tears (featuring Dario Lorina)"	3:59
12.	"Sidescroller"	6:02
13.	"I Can Never Go Home (Reprise)"	6:32
Total length:		49:33

== Musicians ==
=== Primary ===
- Jacky Vincent – Guitars, Composer, Keyboards, Producer
- Ryan Seaman – drums
- Ron Ficarro – bass

=== Additional ===
- Paul Gilbert - guitar (featured on song "Heaven Or Hell")
- Michael Angelo Batio - guitar (featured on song "Star X Speed")
- Dario Lorina - guitar (featured on song "Burning Tears")

=== Production ===
- Mike Varney - Executive Producer
- Kelly Cairns - Drum Editing
- Jason Constantine - Additional Production, Engineer, Mastering, Mixing
