= A Love Like War =

Single by All Time Low featuring Vic Fuentes

from the album Don't Panic: It's Longer Now!
- Released: September 2, 2013
- Genre: Pop punk • post-hardcore
- Length: 3:33
- Label: Hopeless
- Songwriters: Jack Barakat; Rian Dawson; Alex Gaskarth; Mike Green; Zack Merrick
- Producers: Alex Gaskarth; Mike Green

All Time Low singles chronology
"Backseat Serenade" (2013)	"A Love Like War" (2013)	"Something's Gotta Give" (2015)

Vic Fuentes singles chronology
"Somebody That I Used to Know" (2012)	"A Love Like War" (2013)	"Starving for Friends" (2014)

Music video
- "A Love Like War" on YouTube

"A Love Like War" is a song by American rock band All Time Low for the reissue of their fifth studio album Don't Panic: It's Longer Now! (2013). Written and produced by the band's lead vocalist/guitarist Alex Gaskarth and Mike Green, and featuring the input of Pierce the Veil's lead vocalist Vic Fuentes, the song was released through Hopeless Records on September 2, 2013.

== Music video ==
The music video for "A Love Like War" premiered on September 2, 2013. Directed by Drew Russ, the video features the band and Vic Fuentes in a movie theater watching a black and white film. The music video was nominated for Best Video at the Kerrang! Awards.

== Chart performance ==
"A Love Like War" debuted and peaked at number 17 on the Billboard Hot Rock Songs chart, fueled by its peak positions of 15 and 12 on the Rock Digital Songs and Alternative Digital Songs component charts, respectively.

Chart (2013)	Peak position
Belgium (Ultratip Bubbling Under Flanders)	90
UK Singles (Official Charts Company)	56
US Bubbling Under Hot 100 Singles (Billboard)	22
US Hot Rock Songs (Billboard)	17

== Certifications ==
Region	Certification	Certified units/sales
United States (RIAA)	Gold	500,000^{‡}
^{‡} Sales+streaming figures based on certification alone.
