= Passport: Back To The Bars =

Charity

Poster for Passport To The BRITS 2016

Poster for Passport: Back To The Bars 2015

Poster for Passport: Back To The Bars 2004

Passport: Back To The Bars/Passport: To BRITs Week is a charity fundraising project featuring internationally famous music artists performing intimate shows in small venues in the UK. It was originally conceived and created by music executive Stephen Budd and featured 20 shows across 6 venues around the UK in a week in March 2004. These shows generated significant sums of money for two UK registered charities War Child and Shelter.

The project was revived in 2015 and raised over £500,000 for War Child.

The Passport Back To The Bars team present their donation to War Child for the 2015 concert series

== The Project ==
The first edition featured shows by; The Cure, Amy Winehouse, Elbow, Pet Shop Boys, David Gray, The Darkness, Sugababes, Travis, Craig David, Katie Melua, Blazin Squad, Ash, Starsailor, Atomic Kitten, Badly Drawn Boy, Supergrass, Super Furry Animals, Lemar, Spiritualized and Divine Comedy during six nights of concerts held across the UK (Birmingham, Cardiff, Glasgow, Liverpool, London and York) during March 1–6, 2004 at the small 200-500 capacity venues belonging to the Barfly chain, (a part of Channelfly, now MAMA Group PLC).

The 2015 edition featured performances from Elbow, Duran Duran, You Me At Six, Bastille, The Vaccines and Ride. The week long series of events, in association with O2, London Evening Standard, XFM, NME and The Brit Awards raised over £500,000 for War Child and won the 'Best Use Of Events' awards at the National Fundraising Awards 2015.

The Passport...team pick up 'Best Use of Events' award at the 2015 National Fundraising Awards

The 2016 series was announced on 20 January 2016, was renamed Passport To BRITs Week and featured Coldplay, Jack Garratt, Bring Me the Horizon, Bloc Party, Frank Turner, Professor Green, Jamie xx, Above & Beyond, Lianne La Havas and Florence And The Machine

== Fund Raising Mechanism ==
It was the first time that charity concerts had employed a 'Text Message Lottery'; the public paid £1.50 to send a text to a premium rate number in order to get their ‘name in the hat’ to win a pair of entries to an individual artist’s show. The text numbers were promoted via the Daily Mirror and Trinity Mirror’s regional titles, via custom made adverts on MTV’s channels, online partner’s AOL Music site, the artists’ own websites and databases, Music Week, The Fly magazine and other media partners. In order to prevent touts and profiteering, there were no physical tickets issued. Entry winners were notified by text that they would only be able to gain entry by showing their passport at the door - hence the name of the project. Several pairs of ‘entries’ for each show were retained and auctioned online to the highest bidder via eBay. This auction also served as a publicity generator for the project as well as raising additional substantial sums.

The very small size of the shows meant that these were deemed as unmissable occasions for fans of the featured artists and also had no negative effect on ticket sales for the artist’s normal shows.

The text mechanism 'lottery' was subsequently adopted by the Live 8 concert in Hyde Park the following year.
