= Fashionably Late (Falling in Reverse album) =

Studio album by Falling in Reverse
- Released: June 18, 2013
- Recorded: June 2012–2013
- Genres: Post-hardcore; pop-punk; metalcore; electronic rock; rap rock
- Length: 48:33
- Label: Epitaph
- Producers: Michael Baskette; Ronnie Radke; Ryan Ogren

Falling in Reverse chronology
| The Drug in Me Is You (2011) | Fashionably Late (2013) | Just Like You (2015) |

Singles from Fashionably Late
- 1. "Alone" Released: May 7, 2013; 2. "Fashionably Late" Released: May 21, 2013; 3. "Born to Lead" Released: May 30, 2013; 4. "Bad Girls Club" Released: November 5, 2013; 5. "Keep Holding On" Released: January 15, 2014

Fashionably Late is the second studio album by American rock band Falling in Reverse. Production for the album took place following the release of their debut album, The Drug in Me Is You in 2011. It is the only album to feature bassist Ron Ficarro, who would later be replaced by Max Green. Fashionably Late was released on June 18, 2013.

The album was largely panned by music critics upon release.

== Background ==
The band went through late 2012 and early 2013 with no mention of the album at all. Finally, in issue number 1442 of Kerrang! magazine, Ronnie Radke announced in an interview that "The record's finished! That's what we did after the Warped Tour. We just didn't tell anybody!" He also said "[it will be released] early next year [summer 2013]!" On May 7, the band released the first single and music video, "Alone", from the album. The title, Fashionably Late, was officially announced along with the cover and a June 18, 2013 release date, with preorders for the album beginning the same day.

Radke spoke about the album and the addition of new sounds, including hip-hop and electronic elements, saying that, "My dad raised me on metal, but my first serious love was hip-hop," Ronnie explains. "When I heard Dr. Dre's The Chronic, that's when I fell in love. I didn't know what the hell they were talking about, the beats were intertwined, and it came inside of me and took me over. When we added hip-hop elements I was thinking, 'Should I do this? This sounds crazy! Are people going to like this?'" He also expressed satisfaction with the album over Falling in Reverse's debut album as well as his first album with Escape the Fate, stating, "...I've never been so proud of something. The final product... is the best work I've ever done."

== Singles and promotion ==
The first single from the album, "Alone", was released on May 7, 2013. The song features a mix of their previous metalcore sound with elements of rap and electronic music. Radke stated he was inspired by Dr. Dre and his album The Chronic, and plans to mix other songs on the album with similar sounds. The first single was described by Zoiks! Online as, "Blending big radio beats with moshpit inducing riffage, the track addresses Ronnie's critics head-on." In a press statement, Radke stated that "Alone" was, "... Everything I've ever wanted to say to all these Twitter followers that talk shit... [and] I wanted to let everyone that dedicates their lives to just one genre of music know why they are so unhappy." The music video, released the same day, portrayed Radke performing on an airport runway with a Ferrari driving beside him. The song was panned by critics and fans alike. Most discussed the new rap style and lyrics while others discussed the use of computer effects and auto-tune.

The second single, "Fashionably Late", was released on May 20, 2013. The song featured a sound reminiscent of the first Falling in Reverse album, The Drug in Me Is You, and received much more positive reviews than "Alone" from both critics and fans.

To promote the album, Falling in Reverse went on tour from May to July 2013, including the 2013 Vans Warped Tour. On May 13, Falling in Reverse announced on Twitter that the band had cancelled tour dates due to lead singer Radke expecting the birth of his first child with Crissy Henderson. Falling in Reverse officially stated on Facebook: "Our apologies but Falling in Reverse has to cancel the rest of the dates scheduled in May. Ronnie will not be able to appear, as his girlfriend is about to give birth to their first child and he needs to be by her side. Thanks for your understanding. See you soon." They also canceled the dates to play Warped Tour. The tour released the following statement regarding the band's decision: "Falling in Reverse are withdrawing from performing on this summer's Warped Tour. Lead singer Ronnie Radke's fiancé is pregnant with their first child who is due shortly. Radke has made the decision that it's important to be home with his newborn this summer. The band offers sincere apologies to all of their fans who purchased tickets."

On May 30, 2013, another song was released titled "Born to Lead".

Following the cancellation of dates for their tour and Warped Tour, Falling in Reverse celebrated the release of Fashionably Late with a special performance at the Roxy in West Hollywood, California, on June 18, 2013. The one hour set was broadcast online and presented by Hot Topic.

== Commercial performance ==
Despite a negative response to the album, it opened at number 17 on the Billboard 200, selling around 20,000 copies in its first week of release. This is slightly over a thousand more copies than their previous effort, The Drug in Me Is You, which sold 18,000 copies in its first week and charted just 2 spots lower than Fashionably Late, at #19. On the Billboard charts, Fashionably Late charted at number two on the Top Hard Rock Albums chart, number four on the Modern Rock Albums and Top Rock Albums charts, number three on the Top Independent Albums chart, and number 18 on the Top Digital Albums chart, for a total of six appearances on the US Billboard charts, including the Billboard 200. The album has sold 105,000 copies in the united States as of February 2015.

Internationally, the album charted in the United Kingdom, peaking at number 75 on the national chart, as well as number 6 on the UK Top 40 Rock Albums chart. The album also peaked at number 20 on the Australian ARIA Albums Chart.

== Critical reception ==
Professional ratings
Aggregate scores
| Source | Rating |
|---|---|
| Metacritic | 38/100 |
Review scores
| Source | Rating |
| AllMusic | 2/5 stars |
| God Is in the TV | 2/5 |
| Las Vegas Weekly | 2.5/5 stars |
| Tiny Mix Tapes | 1/5 stars |
| Ultimate Guitar | 5/10 |

According to the review aggregator Metacritic, Fashionably Late received "generally unfavorable reviews" based on a weighted average score of 38 out of 100 from 5 critic scores. The album was heavily panned by critics, and is widely regarded as the band's worst album. Some criticized the addition of rap into the album, stating that it did not fit, while others supported the new rap style. Others thought that the album was a mess, going from post-hardcore, to metalcore, to rap, to dubstep, to country. Other critics have expressed their distaste for the Nintendo-like sounds, repetitive sounds, song patterns, and use of sound effects across the album, as well as the addition of Auto-Tune.

Infectious Magazine wrote a positive review about the album, they said "Combing a motley mixture of metalcore, pop, rap, and dubstep, Falling in Reverse deserves an A in originality. Some songs like 'Born to Lead', 'Self Destruct Personality', and 'Fuck the Rest' are more true to classic form: screaming intros, shredding guitar solos, and a general 'rock and roll' attitude. They are catchy, with enough musical toughness to satisfy the alternative cravings." Las Vegas Weekly had mixed review about the album, they said "Fashionably Late, which augments the band's familiar metalcore-with-a-pop-heart with glitchy electronic flourishes, hip-hop swagger, country-influenced instrumentation and, on 'Keep Holding On', piano and strings. Some of these musical progressions work surprisingly well (and Radke is actually a decent rapper), but Fashionably Late's weaker moments—the bratty, misogynistic electro-pop chant 'Bad Girls Club', constant references to Twitter and the awkward video game metaphors and sound effects on 'Game Over'—are cringe-inducing." AllMusic said that "Falling in Reverse deserve credit for their musical versatility" and highlighted to the tracks "Rolling Stone", "Fashionably Late", "Born to Lead" and "Drifter".

== Track listing ==
All tracks are written by Ronnie Radke, except where noted.

Standard edition
| No. | Title | Writer(s) | Length |
|---|---|---|---|
| 1. | "Champion" | Radke, Derek Jones | 4:02 |
| 2. | "Bad Girls Club" | | 3:41 |
| 3. | "Rolling Stone" | Radke, Omar Espinosa | 3:53 |
| 4. | "Fashionably Late" | | 3:33 |
| 5. | "Alone" | | 4:39 |
| 6. | "Born to Lead" (featuring Rusty Cooley) | Radke, Ryan Seaman, Jacky Vincent | 5:19 |
| 7. | "It's Over When It's Over" | | 3:53 |
| 8. | "Game Over" | | 3:10 |
| 9. | "Self-Destruct Personality" | Radke, Jones | 4:16 |
| 10. | "Fuck the Rest" | | 4:24 |
| 11. | "Keep Holding On" | | 4:57 |
| 12. | "Drifter" | | 2:46 |
| Total length: | | | 48:33 |

Deluxe edition bonus tracks
| No. | Title | Length |
|---|---|---|
| 13. | "Where Have You Been" | 3:18 |
| 14. | "Goddamn" | 3:14 |
| 15. | "Rolling Stone" (Shy Kidx remix) | 4:40 |
| Total length: | | 59:45 |

Re-issue bonus tracks
| No. | Title | Length |
|---|---|---|
| 16. | "Gangsta's Paradise" (Coolio cover) | 3:54 |
| 17. | "She's a Rebel" (Green Day cover) | 2:20 |
| Total length: | | 65:19 |

== Personnel ==
Falling in Reverse

- Ronald Joseph Radke – vocals
- Jack Vincent – lead guitar
- Derek Jones – rhythm guitar
- Ryan Eric Seaman – drums
- Ron Ficarro – bass, backing vocals

Additional musicians

- Rusty Cooley - guitar solo on "Born To Lead"
- Omar David Espinosa - additional writing
- Maxwell Scott Green - bass guitar, backing vocals on "She's a Rebel"

Production

- Michael 'Elvis' Baskette – producer
- Ryan John Ogren – additional production, engineer, producer, programming, strings, synthesizer
- Chris Lord-Alge – mixing
- Pete Rutcho – mixing
- Ted Jensen – mastering

== Charts ==
| Chart (2013) | Peak position |
|---|---|
| Australian Albums (ARIA) | 20 |
| Scottish Albums (Official Charts) | 100 |
| UK Albums (Official Charts) | 75 |
| UK Rock & Metal Albums (Official Charts) | 6 |
| US Billboard 200 | 17 |
| US Independent Albums (Billboard) | 4 |
| US Top Alternative Albums (Billboard) | 3 |
| US Top Hard Rock Albums (Billboard) | 2 |
| US Top Rock Albums (Billboard) | 4 |

== Release history ==
| Region | Date | Label | Format | Catalog | Ref |
|---|---|---|---|---|---|
| Australia | June 14, 2013 | Epitaph Records | CD, digital | 8714092725421 | |
| Europe | June 17, 2013 | Epitaph Records | CD, digital | B00CPWR9J6 | |
| Japan | June 18, 2013 | Epitaph Records | CD, digital | 872742 | |
| United States | June 18, 2013 | Epitaph Records | CD, digital | 87254 | |
