= Just Like You (Falling in Reverse song) =

2015 single by Falling in Reverse

Single by Falling in Reverse

from the album Just Like You
- Released: January 24, 2015
- Label: Epitaph
- Songwriters: Ronald Joseph Radke; Michael 'Elvis' Baskette; Charles 'Kallaghan' Massabo
- Producer: Michael Baskette

Falling in Reverse singles chronology
"Sexy Drug" (2015)	"Just Like You" (2015)	"Chemical Prisoner" (2016)

Music video
- "Just Like You" on YouTube

"Just Like You" is the fifth single from American rock band Falling in Reverse's third album Just Like You. The song also featured a music video that currently has around 18 million views, the music video features Falling In Reverse performing on a parody of The Voice called The Choice and Ronnie dresses up as all the judges. Some other musicians make appearances in the video, including Asking Alexandria's Danny Worsnop, The Word Alive's Tyler Smith and rapper B.LAY.

== Personnel ==
Falling in Reverse

- Ronnie Radke – lead vocals
- Jacky Vincent – lead guitar
- Derek Jones – rhythm guitar, backing vocals
- Ryan Seaman – drums, percussion, backing vocals

Additional

- Charles Kallaghan Massabo – bass

== Accolades ==
Year	Award	Result	Place	Ref
2016	Alternative Press Music Awards: Song Of The Year	Nominated	—	
