= Just Like You (Falling in Reverse album) =

Studio album by Falling in Reverse
- Released: February 24, 2015
- Recorded: 2014–2015
- Genres: Post-hardcore; pop-punk; metalcore; screamo
- Length: 45:00
- Label: Epitaph
- Producers: Ronnie Radke; Michael Baskette; Charles Kallaghan Massabo

Falling in Reverse chronology
Fashionably Late (2013)	Just Like You (2015)	Coming Home (2017)

Singles from Just Like You
- 1. "God, If You Are Above..." Released: December 15, 2014; 2. "Guillotine IV (The Final Chapter)" Released: January 13, 2015; 3. "Stay Away" Released: February 15, 2015; 4. "Sexy Drug" Released: February 16, 2015; 5. "Just Like You" Released: February 24, 2015; 6. "Chemical Prisoner" Released: January 27, 2016

Just Like You is the third studio album by American rock band Falling in Reverse. The album had a full stream uploaded to Falling in Reverse's website on February 17, 2015, and was later officially released through Epitaph Records on February 24, 2015. It is the last album to feature lead guitarist Jacky Vincent who announced his departure in late 2015 and would be replaced by Christian Thompson. The album featured the return of the band's former sound after their previous album, Fashionably Late, had a mix of rock and rap. The album is the first to be recorded without an official bassist, with Charles Kallaghan Massabo playing bass on the record.

== Reception ==
Professional ratings
Aggregate scores
Source	Rating
Metacritic	72/100
Review scores
Source	Rating
Alternative Press	90/100
Kerrang!	3/5 stars
Punknews.org	0.5/5 stars
Revolver	4/5 stars
Sputnikmusic	3.3/5.0
Ultimate Guitar Archive	6.3 stars on a 10 point scale

According to the review aggregator Metacritic, Just Like You received "generally favorable reviews" based on a weighted average score of 72 out of 100 from 5 critic scores. Some critics labelled it as the band's best album, with others believing that it is Ronnie Radke's best work. The album was widely hyped up to be a "sequel" to Ronnie Radke's first album Dying Is Your Latest Fashion with Escape the Fate for featuring the return of Falling in Reverse's former sound and also containing two songs ("Guillotine IV (The Final Chapter)" and "My Apocalypse II") that serve as sequels to the original songs included in Dying Is Your Latest Fashion.

Alternative Press said that "Falling In Reverse have given fans the rare gift of an artist stepping back to the sound they originally fell in love with", giving the album a rating of 90/100. Revolver Magazine also gave it a review of 90/100, saying "Post-hardcore fans will certainly enjoy what is Falling in Reverse’s strongest record to date." Some other critics agreed, yet not as strongly; for example, Sputnikmusic said that the album has "the best Falling in Reverse songs" but with "a few exceptions", and gave it an average score of 66/100.

Despite general favorable reviews, there are some critics that did not give any sort of praise on the album. For instance, one critic from Punknews.org was straightforward in their review by saying "Seems like a deliberate maintenance to cash in on the Warped Tour crowd because there's no substance, nor any style, to this record, as has been the case for FIR for years now.", giving the album a very low score of 10/100.

The album was ranked number 50 on Rock Sound's list of top 50 releases for 2015.

== Track listing ==
All tracks are written by Ronnie Radke, Michael 'Elvis' Baskette and Charles 'Kallaghan' Massabo, except where noted.

Standard edition
No.	Title	Length
1.	"Chemical Prisoner"	4:20
2.	"God, If You Are Above..."	3:36
3.	"Sexy Drug"	3:14
4.	"Just Like You"	3:32
5.	"Guillotine IV (The Final Chapter)" (Radke, Massabo, Jacky Vincent)	3:35
6.	"Stay Away" (Radke, Baskette, Thomas Denny)	3:21
7.	"Wait and See" (Radke, Massabo)	4:38
8.	"The Bitter End"	4:03
9.	"My Heart's to Blame" (Radke, Massabo)	3:49
10.	"Get Me Out"	3:45
11.	"Die for You" (Radke, Massabo, Derek Jones)	3:44
12.	"Brother" (Radke, Ryan Ogren)	3:21
Total length:		45:00

Digital and Target deluxe edition
No.	Title	Length
13.	"My Apocalypse II"	3:45
14.	"Pray"	3:37
Total length:		52:22

== Personnel ==
"Just Like You" album personnel as listed on AllMusic

Falling in Reverse

- Ronnie Radke – lead vocals
- Jacky Vincent – lead guitar, backing vocals
- Derek Jones – rhythm guitar, backing vocals
- Ryan Seaman – drums, percussion

Additional personnel

- Michael "Elvis" Baskette – production, mixing, programming, guitar
- Max Green – bass guitar, vocals (uncredited, left during recording)
- Kris Giddens – assistant engineering
- Kevin Thomas – assistant engineering
- Jared Lucas – assistant engineering
- Ivan Wayman – assistant engineering
- Charles Kallaghan Massabo – bass, programming, synthesizer, additional production
- Brett Gurewitz – art direction
- Rowan Daly – cover photography and styling
- Felisha Tolentino – band photography
- Jason Link – album layout
- Marina Mendes – cover model

== Charts ==
=== Weekly charts ===
Chart (2015)	Peak position
Australian Albums (ARIA)	8
New Zealand Albums (RMNZ)	27
Scottish Albums (Official Charts)	55
UK Albums (Official Charts)	57
UK Rock & Metal Albums (Official Charts)	7
US Billboard 200	21
US Independent Albums (Billboard)	2
US Top Album Sales (Billboard)	14
US Top Alternative Albums (Billboard)	3
US Top Hard Rock Albums (Billboard)	2
US Top Rock Albums (Billboard)	4

=== Year-end charts ===
Chart (2015)	Position
US Top Hard Rock Albums (Billboard)	28
