= Jacky Vincent =

British guitarist

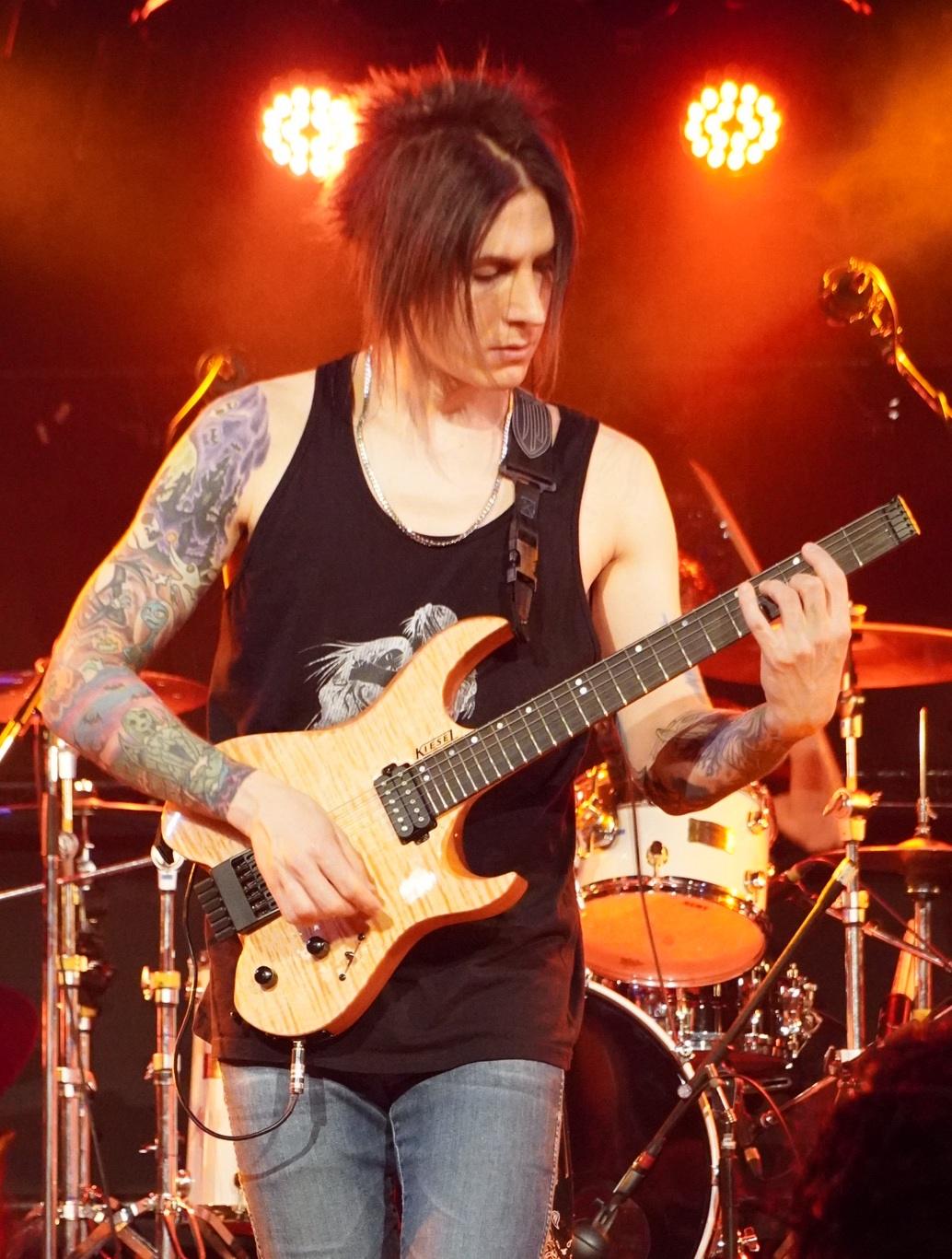
- Vincent in Tokyo, Japan in 2019

Background information
- Born: Jack Casey Vincent; 23 January 1989 (age 37); Portsmouth, England
- Genres: Post-hardcore; pop-punk; metalcore; power metal; hard rock; glam metal
- Occupation: Musician
- Instrument: Guitar
- Years active: 2008–present
- Formerly of: Falling in Reverse; Cry Venom
- Website: jackyvincentofficial.com

Jack Casey Vincent (born 23 January 1989) is a British guitarist. He was the lead guitarist of the American post-hardcore band Falling in Reverse from its formation in 2008 until his departure in 2015. After his departure, he founded power metal band Cry Venom. Since then, Vincent has concentrated on his solo career and teaching. He has two solo albums: Star X Speed Story, came third in the Guitar World 2013 readers poll for Best Shred album, and Life Imitating Art released in 2018. Vincent won the Alternative Press Guitarist of the Year award in 2012 and came third in the Guitar World "Best Shredder" readers pool awards in 2013.

== Career ==
=== Early years ===
Vincent was born on 23 January 1989 in Portsmouth, England. He played in several small English bands and had worked at a bakery before joining Falling in Reverse at the age of 19.

=== Falling in Reverse (2008–2015) ===
Vincent joined Falling in Reverse in 2008 as a founding member of the band. They released their debut album, The Drug in Me Is You, on 26 July 2011, which peaked at number 19 on the Billboard 200, selling 18,000 copies in its first week of sales. In December 2019 the album was certified Gold by the Recording Industry Association of America (RIAA) with 500,000 copies sold. Falling in Reverse's second studio album, Fashionably Late, was released on 18 June 2013, which peaked at number 17 on the Billboard 200. The band released their third studio album, Just Like You on 24 February 2015. On 30 October 2015, Vincent left the band on good terms to focus on his solo career.

=== Cry Venom (2016–present) ===
In 2016, Vincent formed a power metal band called Cry Venom with bassist Niko Gemini, keyboardist Colton Majors, lead vocalist Aleksey Smirnov and drummer Wyatt Cooper.

It is Vincent's first band since his departure from Falling in Reverse in 2015.

They released their debut album called Vanquish the Demon on 6 December 2016.

They embarked on a small club tour dubbed the "Vanquish the West Tour" in mid 2017.

The band was also the opening act for LoudPark in Japan, however, Wyatt Cooper was unable to attend. Because of this, former Falling in Reverse drummer Ryan Seaman reunited with Vincent for the show.

== Personal life ==
Vincent moved to the United States at the age of 20 and now lives in Las Vegas.

== Gear ==
=== Guitars ===
Jacky Vincent has previously used Jackson Guitars as his main instruments, and owns 1 Dinky and 2 Soloists. He later switched to playing and endorsing Dean Guitars, eventually developing his own signature model with the company. Vincent had two signature guitars with the brand. His first model was a 24 fret neck-thru superstrat in a solid purple finish with a Floyd Rose Special bridge and EMG pickups. His later signature model had the classic superstrat HSH configuration, with a bolt-on neck, in a solid black finish with purple hardware and a maple neck.

=== Dean Guitars Endorsee ===
Vincent demonstrated Dean guitars on their stand at the 2013 and 2014 NAMM show in Anaheim California and was a guest at several Dean Guitar owners' clinics at Deans factory in Florida, working with Dean guitar owners. As a result, Vincent gave a series of guitar clinics at Dean stores around China in 2016.

Vincent is currently endorsed by Kiesel Guitars and plays their Vader model that has been fitted with his favourite Di Marzio Evolution pick-ups. Being headless means that there is less weight to support so he can concentrate on his left hand technique and a Dimarzio John Petrucci strap gets the instrument high enough to play at speed standing up.

For effects he uses a Fractal Audio Axe FX 2 XL loaded into a Gator flight case and Pro Tools in his studio.

== Playing style ==
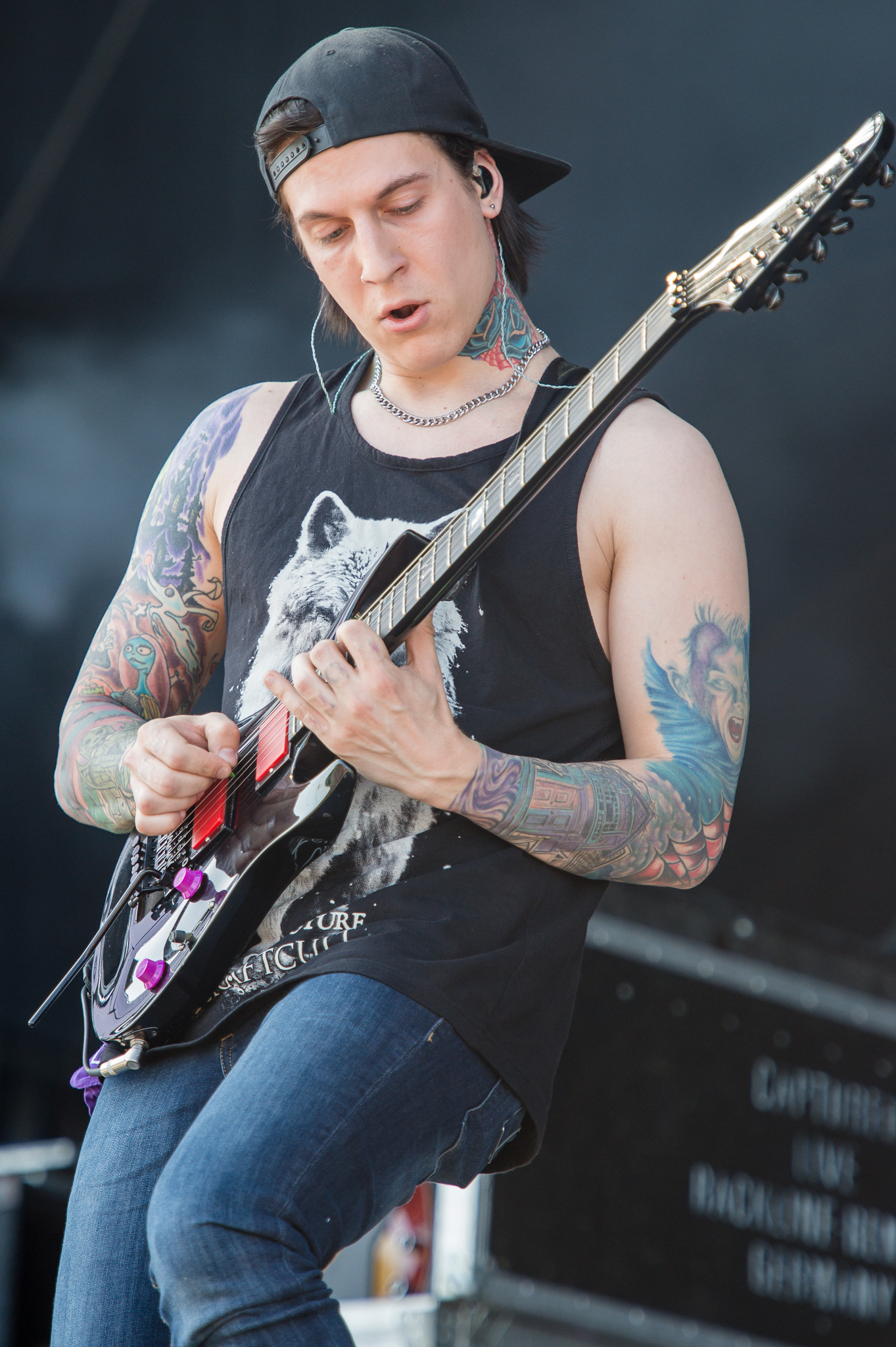
Vincent with Falling in Reverse in 2014

Vincent has stated the reason for doing so is to eliminate any extra hand and wrist movements, making his playing more efficient.

Vincent cited influences such as Paul Gilbert, Michael Angelo Batio, Vinnie Moore, Jason Becker, Shawn Lane, Allan Holdsworth, Brett Garsed, Frank Gambale, Guthrie Govan, Greg Howe, Joe Satriani, Steve Vai, Yngwie Malmsteen, Rusty Cooley, Andy Timmons, Scott Henderson, Derryl Gabel, and Rick Graham.

Vincent also stated that his biggest influences as a child were his father, brother, and bands like DragonForce, Sonata Arctica, Rhapsody of Fire, Galneryus, Heavenly, Dragonland, X Japan, and Angra. Vincent's brother and father taught him how to play the guitar, as explained in his Alternative Press Interview.

== Tours ==
- 2011 Falling in Reverse first headline tour of 24 US venues.
- 2012 Vans Warped Tour and The Thug in Me Is You Tour, Rock on the Range 2012.
- 2012 Falling in Reverse opened for Guns and Roses at the sold-out show in the Hollywood Palladium.
- 2013 Vans Warped Tour, Monster Energy Aftershock Music Festival, Epicenter Festival, Intimate and interactive tour. Latin America tour Argentina, Brazil, Mexico.
- 2014 with Falling in Reverse and Escape the Fate "Bury the Hatchet" tour.
- 2014 Vans Warped Tour, Alternative Press Music Awards 2014. Rock am Ring festival with Iron Maiden and Avenged Sevenfold in Germany, Black Mass tour.
- 2015 Falling in Reverse European Tour 12 dates taking in France, Belgium, Germany, Poland, Austria, Switzerland, Italy and Holland, Three Ring Circus in the US, Rock on the Range, Sonic Boom, Northern Invasion.
- 2015 Westfest festival New Zealand, Soundwave Festivals Australia.
- 2015 Palermo Club, Buenos Aires, Argentina.
- 2017 Loud Park festival. Cry Venom played the heavy metal festival held annually at Saitama Super Arena in Saitama City, Japan.
- Guitar Collective tour 2018 Vincent opened solo for Angel Vivaldi and Nita Strauss and then the show was closed with all three shredding together. A party trick was for Angel and Nita to blindfold Vincent while he continued to shred his solo.
- Tony Mc Alpine Tour 2019. This was sadly cancelled by Tony due to Illness just before Vincent was due to join and open the 20 shows for Tony.
- 2019 Solo shows in Japan to promote Life Imitating Art album.

== Teaching ==
Between tours, writing and product demonstrations, Vincent also teaches his unique style of speed playing on a one to one basis via Skype. Since 2013, he has been a regular contributor to Guitar World magazine by sharing his playing styles and has produced detailed videos complete with backing tracks, fretboard mapping and tablature. 2018 – Sweep Tapping Mechanics 2019 – Lethal Legato, Ultimate Speed Picking Extreme Shred Techniques. Advanced Tapping Phrases.

== Discography ==
Solo

- Star X Speed Story (2013)
- The Sound and the Story Fret 12 (2012)
- Life Imitating Art (2018)

Falling in Reverse

- The Drug in Me Is You (2011)
- Fashionably Late (2013)
- Just Like You (2015)

Cry Venom

- Vanquish the Demon (2016)

Collaborations

- "Death From Above" by Oh, Sleeper (The Titan, 2013)
- "You/Now (Venom)" by I Am WereWolf (Single, 2014)
- "Breaking Damnation" by Jason Richardson (I, 2016)
- "Gotta Catch 'Em All" by Tyler Carter (Single, 2016)
- "Faceless" by KasterTroy (Single, 2018)
- "Euphoria" by Syu (Vorvados, 2019)
- "Forza" by Mickey Lyxx (Single, 2021)
- "Over It" by Ali Slater (Lus!D EP, 2022)
- "Dracula X!" by Marc Hudson (Starbound Stories, 2023)

== Awards ==
Year	winner work	Award	Result	Ref
2012	Jacky Vincent	Alternative Press: Guitarist of the Year Award	Won	
2013	Jacky Vincent	Guitar World Magazine Shred Album of the Year	Third	
2013	Jacky Vincent	Guitar World Magazine Shred Guitarist of the Year	Third	
