= MØ discography =

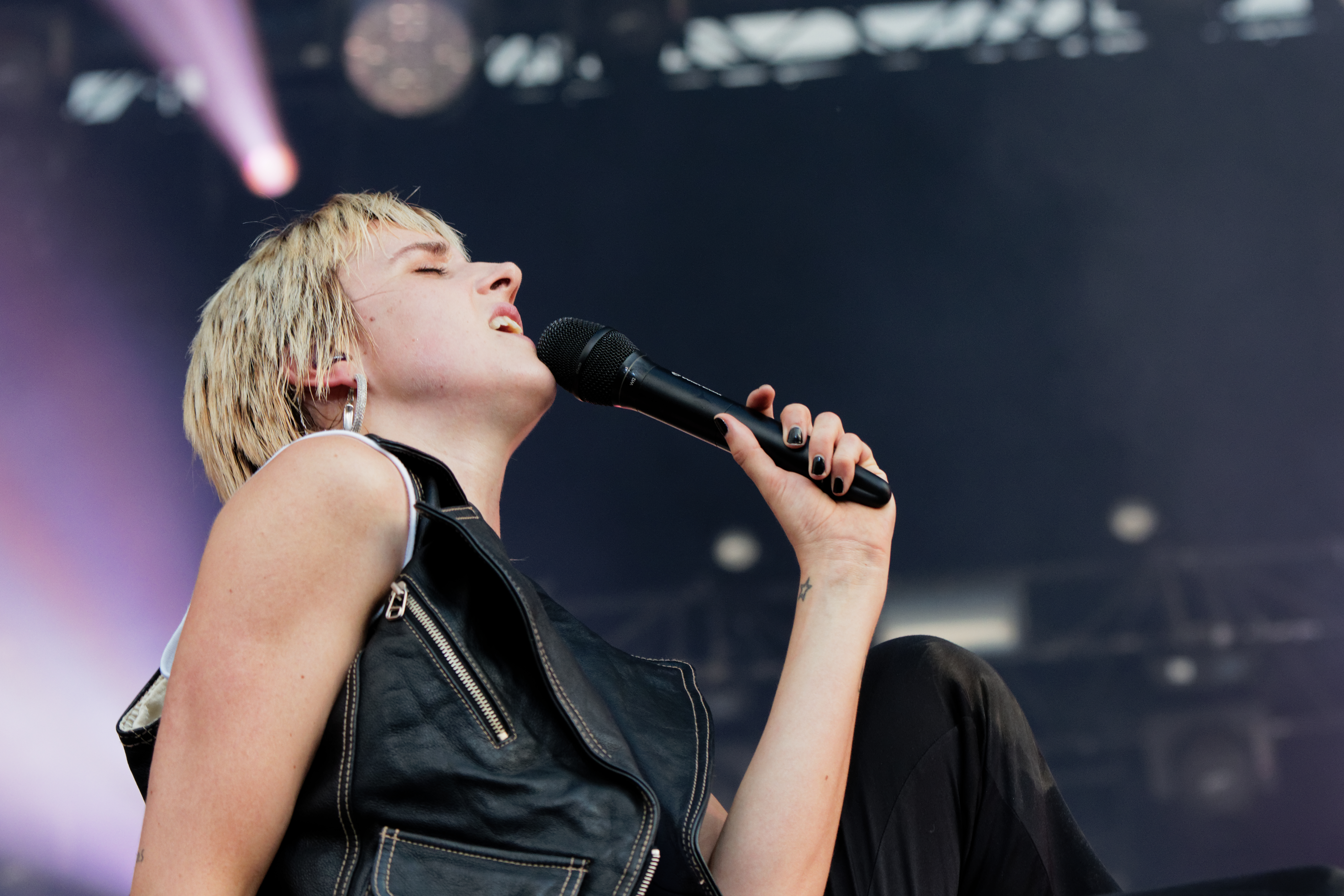
- MØ performing at the Vieilles Charrues Festival in 2018
- Studio albums: 4
- EPs: 3
- Singles: 32
- DJ mixes: 1

Danish singer and songwriter MØ has released four studio albums, three extended plays and twenty six singles, plus six as a featured artist.

On 14 January 2013 she released her debut single, "Glass". On 15 March 2013 she released "Pilgrim" with B-side "Maiden". It peaked at number eleven on the Danish Singles Chart. On 7 June 2013 she released the single "Waste of Time". MØ's first extended play, Bikini Daze was released on 18 October 2013; the track "XXX 88" from the EP was officially released as a single on 20 October. The single "Don't Wanna Dance" debuted on BBC Radio 1 on 16 January 2014 as Zane Lowe's Hottest Record. MØ's debut studio album, No Mythologies to Follow was released on 7 March 2014. In 2014, MØ was featured on Australian rapper Iggy Azalea's song "Beg for It", which was released as the lead single from Azalea's reissue album, Reclassified. MØ co-wrote and provided vocals for Major Lazer song "Lean On" with DJ Snake, which was released in March 2015. On 1 October 2015 it was announced that the first single from MØ's then-upcoming second studio album, "Kamikaze", produced by Diplo would be released on 15 October 2015. On 14 October the single made its world premiere on a BBC Radio segment hosted by Annie Mac before the studio version was released the following day. "Kamikaze" has charted in Denmark, the United Kingdom, Australia and Belgium.

On 13 May 2016, "Final Song" the second single from MØ's second album was released and also made its world premiere on the same radio segment hosted by Annie Mac. The song was co-written with Swedish singer-songwriter Noonie Bao and British singer-songwriter MNEK. It became MØ's first top 40 hit as a lead artist in the United Kingdom, with the song reaching number 15 on the UK Singles Chart. Additionally, the song became a top 40 hit in more than 10 countries worldwide. On 22 July 2016 American group Major Lazer released the single "Cold Water" which features Canadian singer Justin Bieber and MØ. It is the fourth time MØ has worked with Major Lazer. In the United States the song debuted at number two on the Billboard Hot 100, becoming MØ's second top 10 single and highest-charting single in the United States. In the United Kingdom the song debuted at number one on the UK Singles Chart. The song became MØ's first number-one single and she is only the fourth Danish act to reach number one in the UK. Additionally, it is the first time two Danish acts have reached number one in the same year (with the other being Lukas Graham's "7 Years").

== Albums ==
=== Studio albums ===
List of studio albums, with selected chart positions and certifications
Title	Details	Peak chart positions								Certifications
Title	Details	DEN	BEL (FL)	BEL (WA)	FRA	IRE	NLD	UK	US Heat	Certifications
No Mythologies to Follow	Released: 7 March 2014; Label: Chess Club, RCA Victor; Formats: CD, LP, digital download, streaming	2	107	83	161	76	—	58	11	IFPI DEN: Platinum
Forever Neverland	Released: 19 October 2018; Label: Chess Club, RCA Victor, Columbia; Formats: CD, LP, digital download, streaming	1	191	158	—	—	167	—	—	IFPI DEN: Gold
Motordrome	Released: 28 January 2022; Label: Sony UK; Formats: LP, digital download, streaming	9	—	—	—	—	—	—	—	
Plæygirl	Released: 16 May 2025; Label: RCA, Sony UK; Formats: CD, LP, digital download, streaming	—	—	—	—	—	—	—	—	
"—" denotes a recording that did not chart or was not released in that territory.

=== Remix albums ===
Title	Details
Walshy Fire Presents: MMMMØ – The Mix	Released: 1 November 2019; Label: RCA; Format: Digital download, streaming

== Extended plays ==
List of EPs, with selected chart positions
Title	Details	Peak chart positions	
Title	Details	DEN	US Heat
Bikini Daze	Released: 18 October 2013; Label: Chess Club, RCA Victor; Format: LP, digital download, streaming	—	11
When I Was Young	Released: 26 October 2017; Label: Chess Club, RCA Victor; Format: Digital download, streaming	8	—
Plæygirl Remix EP	Released: 22 August 2025; Label: Sony UK; Format: Digital download, streaming	—	—

== Singles ==
=== As lead artist ===
List of singles as lead artist, with selected chart positions and certifications, showing year released and album name
Title	Year	Peak chart positions										Certifications	Album/EP
Title	Year	DEN	AUS	BEL (FL)	CAN	FRA	GER	NOR	NZ	SWE	UK	Certifications	Album/EP
"Glass"	2013	—	—	—	—	—	—	—	—	—	—		No Mythologies to Follow
"Pilgrim"	2013	11	—	—	—	—	—	—	—	—	—	IFPI DEN: Platinum	No Mythologies to Follow
"Waste of Time"	2013	—	—	—	—	—	—	—	—	—	—		No Mythologies to Follow
"XXX 88" (featuring Diplo)	2013	—	—	— (Note: "XXX 88" did not enter the Ultratop 50, but peaked at number 42 on the Flemish Ultratip chart.)	—	—	—	—	—	—	—		Bikini Daze & No Mythologies to Follow
"Don't Wanna Dance"	2014	25	—	— (Note: "Don't Wanna Dance" did not enter the Ultratop 50, but peaked at number 59 on the Flemish Ultratip chart.)	—	—	—	—	—	—	—	IFPI DEN: Gold	No Mythologies to Follow
"Say You'll Be There"	2014	—	—	—	—	—	—	—	—	—	170		No Mythologies to Follow
"Walk This Way"	2014	33	—	—	—	—	—	—	—	—	—		No Mythologies to Follow
"Kamikaze"	2015	16	91	30	—	—	—	—	—	—	183	IFPI DEN: Platinum; RMNZ: Gold	Forever Neverland (Note: "Kamikaze", "Final Song" and "Nights with You" only appeared on the Japanese edition of Forever Neverland.)
"Final Song"	2016	4	12	37	64	42	16	9	20	42	14	IFPI DEN: 2× Platinum; ARIA: 2× Platinum; BPI: Platinum; BVMI: Platinum; GLF: Platinum; RMNZ: 2× Platinum; SNEP: Gold; RIAA: Platinum	Forever Neverland
"Drum"	2016	21	—	—	—	—	—	—	— (Note: "Drum" did not enter the NZ Top 40 Singles Chart, but peaked at number eight on the NZ Heatseeker Singles Chart.)	—	119		Non-album singles
"Don't Leave" (with Snakehips)	2017	11	11	— (Note: "Don't Leave" did not enter the Ultratop 50, but peaked at number 1 on the Flemish Ultratip chart.)	52	71	84	20	16	78	27	IFPI DEN: Gold; ARIA: 2× Platinum; BPI: Gold; RMNZ: 2× Platinum; RIAA: Platinum	Non-album singles
"Nights with You"	2017	21	73	—	—	—	—	—	— (Note: "Nights with You" did not enter the NZ Top 40 Singles Chart, but peaked at number four on the NZ Heatseeker Singles Chart.)	97	—	IFPI DEN: Platinum; ARIA: Gold; RIAA: Gold; RMNZ: Gold	Forever Neverland
"When I Was Young"	2017	37	—	—	—	—	—	—	— (Note: "When I Was Young" did not enter the NZ Top 40 Singles Chart, but peaked at number eight on the NZ Heatseeker Singles Chart.)	—	—		When I Was Young
"Nostalgia"	2018	—	—	—	—	—	—	—	—	—	—		Forever Neverland
"Sun in Our Eyes" (with Diplo)	2018	36	—	— (Note: "Sun in Our Eyes" did not enter the Ultratop 50, but peaked at number 17 on the Flemish Ultratip chart.)	—	—	—	—	— (Note: "Sun in Our Eyes" did not enter the NZ Top 40 Singles Chart, but peaked at number 32 on the NZ Hot Singles Chart.)	—	—	IFPI DEN: Gold; ARIA: Gold	Forever Neverland
"Way Down"	2018	—	—	—	—	—	—	—	—	—	—		Forever Neverland
"Imaginary Friend"	2018	—	—	—	—	—	—	—	—	—	—		Forever Neverland
"Blur" (solo or featuring Foster the People) (Note: The solo version of "Blur" is included as a track on Forever Neverland, while the version featuring Foster the People is a stand-alone single.)	2018	—	—	—	—	—	—	—	—	—	—		Forever Neverland
"Bullet with Butterfly Wings"	2019	—	—	—	—	—	—	—	—	—	—		Non-album singles
"On & On"	2019	—	—	—	—	—	—	—	— (Note: "On & On" did not enter the NZ Top 40 Singles Chart, but peaked at number 40 on the NZ Hot Singles Chart.)	—	—		Non-album singles
"Live to Survive"	2021	—	—	—	—	—	—	—	—	—	—	IFPI DEN: Gold	Motordrome (Note: "True Romance" and "Spaceman" are only included on the Dødsdrom edition of Motordrome)
"Kindness"	2021	—	—	—	—	—	—	—	—	—	—		Motordrome
"Brad Pitt"	2021	—	—	—	—	—	—	—	—	—	—		Motordrome
"Goosebumps"	2021	—	—	—	—	—	—	—	—	—	—		Motordrome
"New Moon" (solo or remix featuring Rebecca Black) (Note: The solo version of "New Moon" is included as an album track on Motordrome, while the remix featuring Rebecca Black is a stand-alone single.)	2022	—	—	—	—	—	—	—	—	—	—		Motordrome
"True Romance"	2022	—	—	—	—	—	—	—	—	—	—		Motordrome
"Spaceman"	2022	—	—	—	—	—	—	—	—	—	—		Motordrome
"Fake Chanel"	2024	—	—	—	—	—	—	—	—	—	—		No Mythologies to Follow (Note: "Fake Chanel" is only included on the 10th Anniversary edition of No Mythologies to Follow.)
"Who Said"	2024	—	—	—	—	—	—	—	—	—	—		Plæygirl
"Sweet" (featuring Biig Piig)	2025	—	—	—	—	—	—	—	—	—	—		Plæygirl
"Keep Møving"	2025	—	—	—	—	—	—	—	—	—	—		Plæygirl
"Lose Yourself"	2025	—	—	—	—	—	—	—	—	—	—		Plæygirl
"Heartbreak"	2025	—	—	—	—	—	—	—	—	—	—		Plæygirl
"Hunnybån"	2026	—	—	—	—	—	—	—	—	—	—		Non-album singles
"Fine Curls"	2026	—	—	—	—	—	—	—	—	—	—		Non-album singles
"—" denotes a recording that did not chart or was not released in that territory.

=== As featured artist ===
List of singles as featured artist, with selected chart positions and certifications, showing year released and album name
Title	Year	Peak chart positions										Certifications	Album
Title	Year	DEN	AUS	BEL (FL)	CAN	FRA	GER	IRE	NZ	UK	US	Certifications	Album
"One More" (Elliphant featuring MØ)	2014	—	—	— (Note: "One More" did not enter the Ultratop 50, but peaked at number 56 on the Flemish Ultratip chart.)	—	—	—	—	—	—	—		Living Life Golden
"Beg for It" (Iggy Azalea featuring MØ)	2014	—	29	— (Note: "Beg for It" did not enter the Ultratop 50, but peaked at number nine on the Flemish Ultratip chart.)	44	—	—	—	—	111	27	RIAA: Platinum	Reclassified
"Lean On" (Major Lazer and DJ Snake featuring MØ)	2015	1	1	2	3	2	4	1	1	2	4	IFPI DEN: Platinum; ARIA: 10× Platinum; BEA: 2× Platinum; BPI: 4× Platinum; BVMI: 2× Platinum; MC: 2× Platinum; RIAA: 4× Platinum; RMNZ: 4× Platinum; SNEP: Diamond	Peace Is the Mission
"Lost" (Major Lazer featuring MØ)	2015	—	—	—	—	—	—	—	—	—	—		Peace Is the Mission
"Cold Water" (Major Lazer featuring Justin Bieber and MØ)	2016	2	1	4	1	2	2	1	1	1	2	IFPI DEN: 3× Platinum; ARIA: 4× Platinum; BEA: 2× Platinum; BPI: 3× Platinum; BVMI: Platinum; MC: 2× Platinum; RIAA: 4× Platinum; RMNZ: Platinum; SNEP: Platinum	Major Lazer Essentials
"9 (After Coachella)" (Cashmere Cat featuring MØ and Sophie)	2017	—	—	—	—	—	—	—	—	—	—		9
"Get It Right" (Diplo featuring MØ)	2017	—	77	— (Note: "Get It Right" did not enter the Ultratop 50, but peaked at number 21 on the Flemish Ultratip chart.)	76	—	—	—	—	—	—	RMNZ: Platinum	Major Lazer Presents: Give Me Future
"We Are..." (Noah Cyrus featuring MØ)	2018	—	—	—	—	—	—	—	—	—	—		Non-album singles
"Stay Open" (Diplo featuring MØ)	2018	—	—	—	—	—	—	—	—	—	—		Non-album singles
"Your Lovin'" (Steel Banglez featuring MØ and Yxng Bane)	2018	—	—	—	—	—	—	—	—	47	—	BPI: Gold	Non-album singles
"—" denotes a recording that did not chart or was not released in that territory.

=== Promotional singles ===
List of promotional singles, showing year released and album name
Title	Year	Album
"Wake Me Up"	2024	Plæygirl

== Other charted songs ==
Title	Year	Peak chart positions	Album
Title	Year	NZ Heat.	Album
"3AM (Pull Up)" (Charli XCX featuring MØ)	2017	9	Number 1 Angel

== Songwriting credits ==
Title	Year	Artist(s)	Album	Songwriter co-credits
"All My Love"	2014	Major Lazer featuring Ariana Grande	The Hunger Games: Mockingjay, Part 1	Ella Yelich-O'Connor, Ariana Grande-Butera, Thomas Pentz, Boaz de Jong, Philip Meckseper
"Burning Bridges"	2016	Patrice	Life's Blood	Thomas Pentz, Maxime Picard, Clément Picard
"Fighting for the Gospel"	2020	Goss featuring Sema Judith	Group Therapy	Mads Damsgaard Kristiansen
"Lay Your Head on Me"	2020	Major Lazer featuring Marcus Mumford	Music is the Weapon	Thomas Pentz, Marcus Mumford, Henry Agincourt Allen, Jasper Helderman, Bas van Daalen
"Country Boy"	2020	Goss	Group Therapy	Mads Damsgaard Kristiansen, Mads Koch Kjærgaard
"On Mine"	2020	Diplo featuring Noah Cyrus	Diplo Presents Thomas Wesley, Chapter 1: Snake Oil	Thomas Pentz, Henry Agincourt Allen, Julia Michaels, Maximilian Jaeger
"Everybody's Going"	2020	Goss	Group Therapy	Mads Damsgaard Kristiansen, Tobias Laust Hansen, Jakob Torp Littauer
"If The House Is Gonna Burn"	2021	Soleima	Powerslide (Deluxe)	Sarah Mariegaard, Nick Labajewska Madsen
"Lovers in the Night"	2021	Seori	Non-album single	Madison Love, Albin Nedler, Kristoffer Fogelmark
"Witch Hunt"	2022	Alice Glass	Prey//IV	Alice Glass, Jupiter Keyes
"Never Been Yours"	2024	Benny Benassi & Oaks	Non-album single	Benny Benassi, Caroline Ailin, Giancarlo Constantin, Noonie Bao, Sylvester Sivertsen, Linus Wiklund

== Guest appearances ==
Title	Year	Other artist(s)	Album
"Dear Boy"	2013	Avicii	True
"You're Still a Mystery"	2015	Jack Antonoff	Terrible Thrills, Vol. 2
"Diamonds"	2017	Eloq	Non-album song
"3AM (Pull Up)"	2017	Charli XCX	Number 1 Angel
"Porsche"	2017	Charli XCX	Pop 2
"Let's Get Married"	2017	Bleachers	Gone Now
"Dance for Me"	2018	Alma	Heavy Rules Mixtape
"Never Fall in Love"	2018	Bleachers	Love, Simon
"There's Just So Much a Heart Can Take"	2018	Goss	Homeland Security
"Theme Song (I'm Far Away)"	2019	None	Moominvalley (Official Soundtrack)
"Northern Lights"	2019	Goss	Moominvalley (Official Soundtrack)
"Running Wild"	2019	Vasco	Tender Luv
"Reckless"	2022	Gryffin	Alive
"Saturn Return"	2022	Jada	Elements (Deluxe)
"Attack of the Ghost Riders"	2023	The Raveonettes	The Raveonettes Presents: Rip It Off
"Æteren"	2025	Artigeardit, Vera	Æteren
"2 LØVE"	2025	Frost Children	Sister

== Music videos ==
Title	Year	Director
"Glass"	2013	Casper Balslev
"Let the Youth Go Mad" (Broke featuring MØ)	2013	Ian Isak Ploug Ochoa
"Pilgrim" (MS MR Remix)	2013	Esben Weile Kjær
"Waste of Time"	2013	Anders Malmberg
"XXX 88" (featuring Diplo)	2013	Tim Erem
"Don't Wanna Dance"	2014	Georgia Hudson
"Walk This Way"	2014	Emilie Rafael
"One More" (Elliphant featuring MØ)	2014	Tim Erem
"New Year's Eve"	2014	Anne Sofie Skaaring
"Lean On" (Major Lazer and DJ Snake featuring MØ)	2015	Tim Erem
"Kamikaze"	2015	Truman & Cooper
"Final Song"	2016	Tomas Whitmore
"Drum"	2016	Georgia Hudson
"Don't Leave" (Snakehips and MØ)	2017	Malia James
"When I Was Young"	2017	J.A.C.K
"Get It Right" (Diplo featuring MØ)	2018	Brantley Gutierrez
"Nostalgia"	2018	Jonas Bang
"Sun In Our Eyes" (with Diplo)	2018	David Helman
"Imaginary Friend"	2018	MØ, Jonas Bang
"Blur" (featuring Foster the People)	2018	Lauren Sick
"I Want You"	2019	Emma Rosenzweig
"Beautiful Wreck"	2019	Emma Rosenzweig
"Red Wine" (featuring Empress Of)	2019	Emma Rosenzweig
"Live to Survive"	2021	Joanna Nordahl
"Kindness"	2021	Florian Joahn
"Brad Pitt"	2021	Fryd Frydendahl
"Goosebumps"	2021	Rob Sinclair, Lewis Knaggs
"New Moon"	2022	Fa & Fon
"True Romance"	2022	Casper Balslev
"Reckless" (Gryffin and MØ)	2022	Daniel Chaney
"Spaceman"	2022	Fa & Fon
