= Drug (disambiguation) =

A drug is any chemical substance other than a food or device that affects the function of living things.

Drug(s) or D.R.U.G.S. may also refer to:

== Places ==
- Drug or Durg, a city in India
- Drug Island, Alaska, U.S.
- Drug Dome

== Arts, entertainment and media ==
=== Music ===
==== Groups and production teams ====
- DRUGS, a funk musical group founded by Michael "Clip" Payne
- D.R.U.G.S., or Directing Reality Undermining Governed Systems, a production team founded by rapper Ty Dolla Sign
- Destroy Rebuild Until God Shows, an American post-hardcore band previously known as D.R.U.G.S.

==== Albums and mixtapes ====
- D.R.U.G.S. (album), 2011 album by Destroy Rebuild Until God Shows
- D.R.U.G.S. (Death and Reincarnation Under God's Supervision), 2012 mixtape by Flatbush Zombies

==== Songs ====
- "Drug", a 2011 song by White Denim from D
- "Drugs", 1979 song by Talking Heads from Fear of Music
- "D.R.U.G.S.", 2000 song by Phife Dawg from Ventilation: Da LP
- "D.R.U.G.S.", 2000 song by Fiend from Can I Burn?
- "D.R.U.G.S.", 2009 song by Dead and Divine from The Machines We Are
- "D.R.U.G.S.", 2009 song by The Raveonettes from In and Out of Control
- "D.R.U.G.S.", 2011 song by Iggy Azalea
- "D.R.U.G.S.", 2016 song by Ab-Soul from Do What Thou Wilt.
- "Drugs", 2017 song by Charli XCX from Number 1 Angel
- Drugs (Ammonia song), 1995
- Drugs (Falling in Reverse song), 2019

=== Other arts, entertainment, and media ===
- Drûg, a term for a member of the Drúedain, a Middle-earth race in the fiction of J. R. R. Tolkien
- Drugs (journal), a peer-reviewed medical journal
- "Drugs" (Brass Eye), a 1997 television episode
- "Drugs" (Not Going Out), a 2011 television episode

== Grapes ==
- Graciano, or Drug, a wine grape

== See also ==
- Antiretroviral drug
- Antiviral drug
- Approved drug, drug approval by the Food and Drug Administration in the United States
- Drug abuse
- Drug liberalization
- Hard and soft drugs
- Illegal drug trade
- Inverse benefit law
- List of drugs
- Misuse of Drugs Act 1971, the United Kingdom act under which substances defined as drugs are listed and controlled
- Performance-enhancing drug
- Pharmaceutical drug
- Psychoactive drug, chemical substance used to alter behavior and perception for many differing reasons
- Recreational drug use
