= Blur (MØ song) =

Single by MØ

from the album Forever Neverland
- Released: 15 October 2018
- Genre: Electro-pop; dance
- Length: 3:02
- Label: Chess Club; RCA Victor
- Songwriters: Karen Marie Ørsted; Ajay Bhattacharyya; Kristoffer Fogelmark; Albin Nedler; Mark Foster
- Producers: Kristoffer Fogelmark; Albin Nedler; Stint; Monkey Business

MØ singles chronology
"Imaginary Friend" (2018)	"Blur" (2018)	"Bullet with Butterfly Wings" (2019)

Foster the People singles chronology
"Worst Nites" (2018)	"Blur" (Remix) (2018)	"Style" (2019)

Music video
- "Blur" (feat. Foster the People) on YouTube

Lyric video
- "Blur" on YouTube

"Blur" is a song by Danish singer and songwriter MØ. It was released on 15 October 2018 as the fourth and final single from her second studio album, Forever Neverland (2018).

== Background ==
In the lead-up to the release of her second studio album Forever Neverland, MØ released "Blur" on 15 October 2018, adding to the anticipation surrounding the album. She explained that she wrote the song during a session in Stockholm at the end of 2016, while feeling exhausted and jet-lagged from months of touring and travelling between Europe and Los Angeles. According to MØ, the writing process felt therapeutic, and the song came to reflect feelings of being lost both personally and creatively, particularly during her time in Los Angeles. She further elaborated that the song, for her, was about feeling creatively and artistically adrift in what she described as "the city of all great opportunities". Prior to "Blur", MØ had previewed Forever Neverland with the singles "Sun in Our Eyes", a collaboration with Diplo, "Way Down", and the Illangelo-produced "Imaginary Friend".

Since the end of October, a remixed version of "Blur" featuring Foster the People frontman Mark Foster received airplay on radio stations. MØ later previewed the remix and an accompanying music video via social media. The preview tweet included a photo of MØ riding shotgun with Foster behind the wheel, both dressed in dark-colored outfits. Both the remix and the music video were released on Friday, 30 November 2018. In the updated version of the track, MØ retains her original opening verse and chorus, while Foster performs the second verse, followed by a duet on the final full chorus; the outro remains unchanged. Another remix version of "Blur" by Felix Cartal was released on 11 January 2019.

== Composition ==
Sony Music described "Blur" as an introspective and personal track with a playful approach to songwriting and production that is characteristically MØ. Billboard noted that the song features a catchy chorus of MØ's distorted vocals, followed by a rhythmic beat drop, embodying the kind of electro-pop dance hit she is known for. The lyrics reflect a desire to break free from a life where she has taken the backseat and lost control.

== Promotion ==
MØ performed "Blur" on The Tonight Show Starring Jimmy Fallon as part of the promotion for Forever Neverland. During the performance, she and her band played in front of a large moon backdrop illuminated by red light, visually reflecting the song's opening lyric, "Under the bad, bad moon tonight / Baby you should trust me".

== Charts ==
Chart performance for "Blur"
Chart (2018)	Peak position
Belgium (Ultratip Bubbling Under Flanders)	21
Canada Rock (Billboard)	36
Denmark Airplay (Hitlisten)	13
US Alternative Airplay (Billboard)	35

== Release history ==
Release dates and formats for "Blur"
Region	Date	Version	Format	Label	Ref.
Various	15 October 2018	Original	Digital download; streaming	Sony UK	
Italy	19 October 2018	Original	Airplay	Sony UK	
Various	30 November 2018	featuring Foster the People	Digital download; streaming	Sony UK	
Various	11 January 2019	Felix Cartal remix	Digital download; streaming	Sony UK	
