= When I Was Young (EP) =

EP by MØ
- Released: 26 October 2017
- Length: 20:07
- Label: Sony
- Producer: MØ; Kristoffer Fogelmark; FTSE; Grant William Russell Harris; Mantra; Albin Neder; Fridolin Nordsø; Vera; Vasco

MØ chronology
No Mythologies to Follow (2014)	When I Was Young (2017)	Forever Neverland (2018)

Singles from When I Was Young
- 1. "When I Was Young" Released: 26 October 2017

When I Was Young is the second extended play (EP) by Danish singer-songwriter MØ, released on 26 October 2017 by Sony Music. The EP was produced by MØ alongside Kristoffer Fogelmark, FTSE, Grant William Russell Harris, Mantra, Albin Neder, Fridolin Nordsø, Vera, and Vasco.

== Background ==
In the lead-up to its release, MØ shared teasers for When I Was Young, clarifying that its title track is unrelated to the similarly titled song by The Killers. She described the process of making the EP as a return to the creative basics of music-making, including assembling lyrics, song titles, and artwork. The six-track collection marks her first solo extended project since the release of her debut album No Mythologies to Follow (2014). During the years between, MØ released several solo singles—including "Nights with You", "Final Song", "Drum", and "Kamikaze"—and collaborated with various artists.

== Tour ==
MØ has embarked on the When I Was Young Tour. The tour ran from 4 November to 26 November 2017, mostly in Asia. Shows in Australia were part of Sia's tour.

== Track listing ==
Credits were adapted from Tidal.

No.	Title	Writer(s)	Producer(s)	Length
1.	"Roots"	Karen Ørsted; Nick Madsen; Hasse Møller; Adam Ashtiani	MØ; Vasco	3:31
2.	"When I Was Young"	Ørsted; Ronni Vindahl; Daniel Mizhrahi; James Allan; Kristoffer Fogelmark; Albin Nedler; Grant Harris	Fogelmark; Nedler; Harris; Mantra	3:39
3.	"Turn My Heart to Stone"	Ørsted; Mads Kjaergaard; Malthe Beck; William Asingh	Vera	3:07
4.	"Linking with You"	Ørsted; Rob Tailor; Kenzie May; Sam Manville; Nick Madsen; Asingh	Vera; Vasco; FTSE	3:23
5.	"BB"	Ørsted; Madsen; Asingh	Vera; Vasco	3:22
6.	"Run Away"	Ørsted; Madsen; Fridolin Nordsø	MØ; Vasco; Nordsø	3:05
Total length:				20:07

== Charts ==
Chart performance for When I Was Young
Chart (2017)	Peak position
Danish Albums (Hitlisten)	8
