= Drugs (Falling in Reverse song) =

Single by Falling in Reverse featuring Corey Taylor
- Released: April 8, 2019
- Length: 3:51
- Label: Epitaph
- Songwriters: Ronald Joseph Radke; Charles Kallaghan Massabo; Cody Quistad
- Producers: Tyler Smyth; Ronnie Radke

Falling in Reverse singles chronology
"Losing My Life" (2018)	"Drugs" (2019)	"Popular Monster" (2019)

Corey Taylor singles chronology
"London Calling" (2013)	"Drugs" (2019)	"Black Eyes Blue" (2020)

Music video
- "Drugs" on YouTube

"Drugs" is a song by American rock band Falling in Reverse featuring American singer and composer Corey Taylor. It was released on April 8, 2019, through Epitaph Records. This is the band's third single without an album being announced, and is the culmination of the saga featuring the songs "Losing My Mind" and "Losing My Life". The song was produced by DangerKids vocalist Tyler Smyth and vocalist Ronnie Radke. The song also features Black Veil Brides drummer Christian "CC" Coma.

== Promotion and release ==
In March 2019, the members of the band uploaded what would be the cover of the then-upcoming single on their social networks. On April 8, 2019, the new single "Drugs" came out, a collaboration with Corey Taylor, lead vocalist of Slipknot and Stone Sour. In addition, Black Veil Brides drummer Christan "CC" Coma contributed to the song.

This song marks the departure of keyboardist and guitarist Zakk Sandler, as he was not seen in the music video. The band announced the "Episode III Tour" as the headlining band, alongside bands such as Ice Nine Kills, New Year's Day and From Ashes to New, as well as CC's participation in the tour.

== Composition and lyrics ==
Corey Taylor's part is the heaviest part of the song, since his singing with gutturals sounds more like his voice in songs by Slipknot rather than ones by Stone Sour.

== Music video ==
The music video for the song was directed by Ethan Lader, the video shows Ronnie Radke continuing the battle against his other self. However, this time he fights against the Ronnie who was the protagonist of the music video for "Losing My Life", the video again has the participation of his daughter Willow Radke. The music video has more than 30 million views on YouTube.

== Track listing ==
The track listing provided from a version of the single only released on Spotify.

No.	Title	Writer(s)	Length
1.	"Drugs"	Ronnie Radke; Charles Massabo; Cody Quistad	3:51
2.	"Losing My Mind"	Radke; Tyler Smyth; Cody Stewart	4:18
3.	"Losing My Life"	Radke; Smyth; Stewart	5:00
Total length:			13:09

== Personnel ==
Falling in Reverse

- Ronnie Radke – vocals, keyboards, composer, producer
- Derek Jones – rhythm guitar, backing vocals
- Max Georgiev – lead guitar, backing vocals
- Tyler Burgess – bass guitar, backing vocals

Additional musicians

- Corey Taylor – vocals
- Christian "CC" Coma – drums
- Tyler Smyth – producer, keyboards, synth, drum pad
- Charles Kallaghan Massabo – composer, engineer, beat
- Cody Quistad – composer, guitar

== Charts ==
Chart performance for "Drugs"
Chart (2019–2022)	Peak position
Germany Rock Airplay (Official German Charts)	1
US Hot Hard Rock Songs (Billboard)	21
US Hard Rock Digital Song Sales (Billboard)	21
