= Nights with You =

Single by MØ

from the album Forever Neverland (Japanese edition)
- Released: 21 April 2017
- Recorded: 2017
- Genre: Pop; dance
- Length: 3:17
- Label: Sony
- Songwriters: Benjamin Levin; Magnus August Høiberg; Karen Marie Ørsted; Ryan Tedder; Sophie Xeon
- Producers: Sophie; Benny Blanco; Cashmere Cat

MØ singles chronology
"9 (After Coachella)" (2017)	"Nights with You" (2017)	"Get It Right" (2017)

Music video
- Nights with You on YouTube

"Nights with You" is a song by Danish singer and songwriter MØ. It was released on 21 April 2017 via Sony Music for her second studio album, Forever Neverland, but was only included on the Japanese release of the album. The song premiered on MistaJam's BBC Radio 1 show.

== Music video ==
The music video was released on 22 May 2017 and filmed in Plovdiv and Buzludzha, Bulgaria. According to MØ, "'Nights With You' was written for my best and oldest friend, and the song is a celebration of our friendship and of my love for her, [...] I obviously wanted the video to be about friendship but I wanted it to communicate this in a wide and universal way. I wanted it to be a reflection on unity in both bright times and in dark — about standing together strong and shining the light across borders and generations."

== Track listing ==
Digital download / streaming
No.	Title	Length
1.	"Nights with You"	3:17

== Personnel ==
Adapted from Tidal.

- MØ – composer, vocalist
- Benny Blanco, Cashmere Cat, Sophie – composer, producer, keyboard, programmer
- Ryan Tedder – composer
- Serban Ghenea – mixing engineer
- John Davies – mastering engineer
- John Hanes, David Schwerkolt – engineer
- Andrew Luftman, Seif Hussain, Sarah Shelton – coordinator

== Charts ==
Chart performance for "Nights with You"
Chart (2017)	Peak position
Australia (ARIA)	73
Czech Republic Singles Digital (ČNS IFPI)	60
Denmark (Hitlisten)	21
Ireland (IRMA)	96
Netherlands (Single Tip)	3
Sweden (Sverigetopplistan)	97

== Certifications ==
Certifications for "Nights with You"
Region	Certification	Certified units/sales
Australia (ARIA)	Gold	35,000^{‡}
Denmark (IFPI Danmark)	Platinum	90,000^{‡}
New Zealand (RMNZ)	Gold	15,000^{‡}
United States (RIAA)	Gold	500,000^{‡}
^{‡} Sales+streaming figures based on certification alone.

== Release history ==
Release dates and formats for "Nights with You"
Region	Date	Format	Label	Ref.
Various	21 April 2017	Digital download; streaming	Sony	
