= Imaginary Friend (MØ song) =

Single by MØ

from the album Forever Neverland
- Released: 21 September 2018
- Genre: Electropop
- Length: 3:48
- Label: Chess Club; RCA Victor
- Songwriter(s): Karen Marie Ørsted; Carlo Montagnese; Billy Walsh; Noonie Bao
- Producer(s): Carlo "Illangelo" Montagnese

MØ singles chronology
"Way Down" (2018)	"Imaginary Friend" (2018)	"Blur" (2018)

Music video
- "Imaginary Friend" on YouTube

"Imaginary Friend" is a song by Danish singer and songwriter MØ. It was released on 7 September 2018 as the third single from her second studio album, Forever Neverland (2018).

== Background ==
"Imaginary Friend" was released as a single in the lead-up to MØ's second studio album, Forever Neverland. The track followed earlier releases including "Way Down", "Nostalgia", and the Diplo collaboration "Sun in Our Eyes". Its accompanying visuals, co-directed by Jonas Bang and MØ, were issued shortly before the album's release.

== Composition ==
According to Consequence, "Imaginary Friend" is a swaying electropop track that incorporates sensual elements. The outlet highlighted the song's lyrics, describing them as delivered in a tempting, incantatory style. Cool Hunting described the track, produced by Illangelo, as evidence of MØ's ability to craft distinctive dance music, noting her voice functions almost like an instrument. The review also pointed out the presence of harp, a ticking clock, and rhythmic bass in the production.
