= Forever Neverland =

Studio album by MØ
- Released: 19 October 2018
- Recorded: 2015–2018
- Genre: Pop
- Length: 44:48
- Labels: Chess Club; RCA Victor; Columbia
- Producers: Benny Blanco; Boaz van de Beatz; Cashmere Cat; DalePlay; Diplo; Frank Dukes; James Flannigan; Kristoffer Fodgelmark; John Hill; King Henry; Illangelo; Jr Blender; MantraBeats; Kurtis McKenzie; MNEK; Albin Nedler; Sophie; StarGate; Stint; What So Not

MØ chronology
When I Was Young (2017)	Forever Neverland (2018)	Motordrome (2022)

Singles from Forever Neverland
- 1. "Sun in Our Eyes" Released: 12 July 2018; 2. "Way Down" Released: 7 September 2018; 3. "Imaginary Friend" Released: 21 September 2018; 4. "Blur" Released: 15 October 2018

Forever Neverland is the second studio album by Danish singer and songwriter MØ. It was released on 19 October 2018 via Chess Club Records, RCA Victor, and Columbia Records. Her first studio album in 4 years since her debut studio album No Mythologies to Follow (2014), the album was preceded by four singles: "Sun in Our Eyes" with Diplo, "Way Down", "Imaginary Friend" and "Blur". It also features collaborations with Charli XCX, What So Not, Two Feet and Empress Of.

Forever Neverland received generally favorable reviews from critics, who praised its bold pop production, introspective themes, and MØ's effort to define her artistic identity beyond her previous collaborations. Some reviewers found the production occasionally oversaturated, though others highlighted its consistency and personal tone. The album debuted at number one on the Danish Albums Chart and appeared on several year-end best album lists.

== Background ==
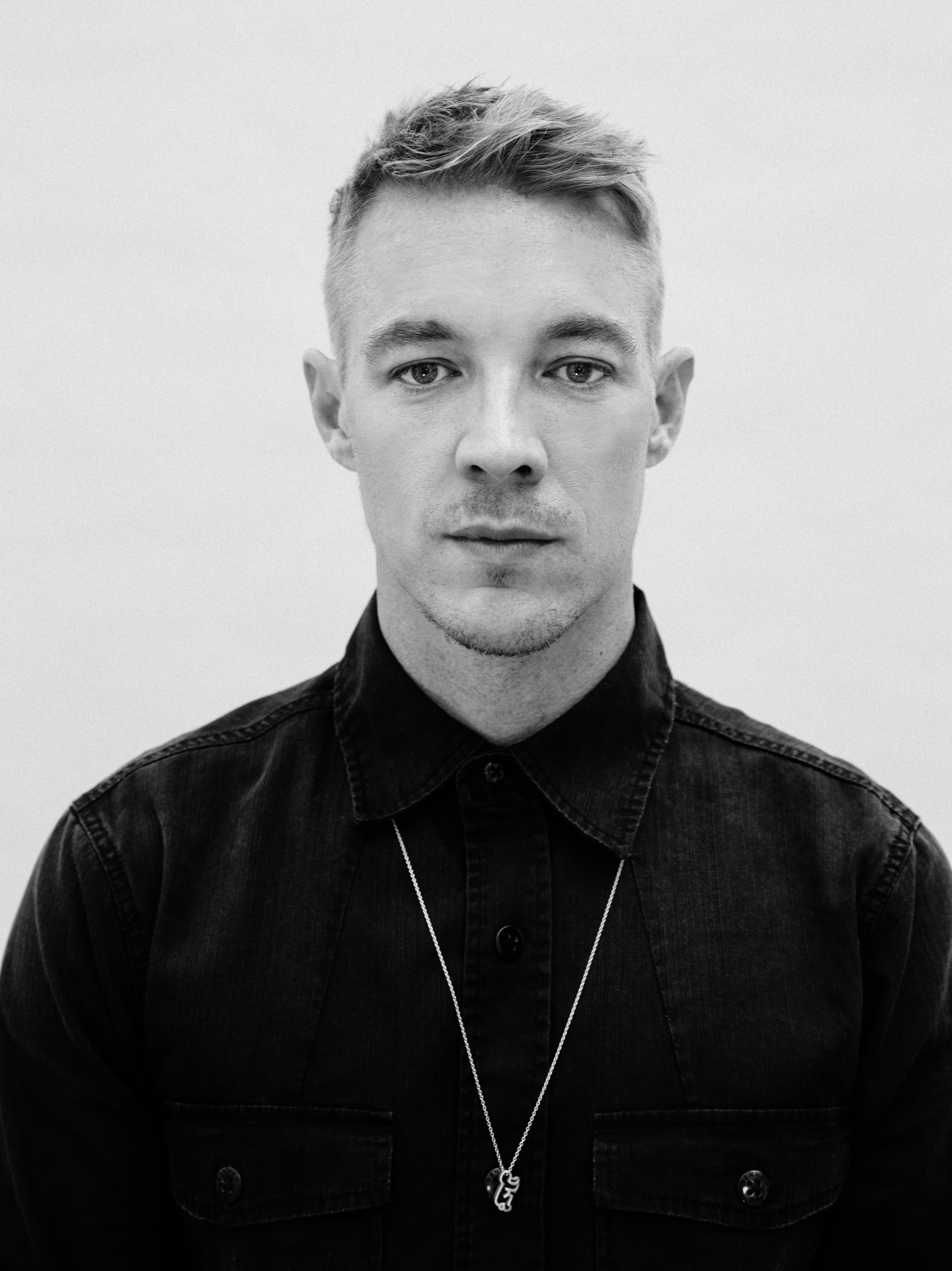
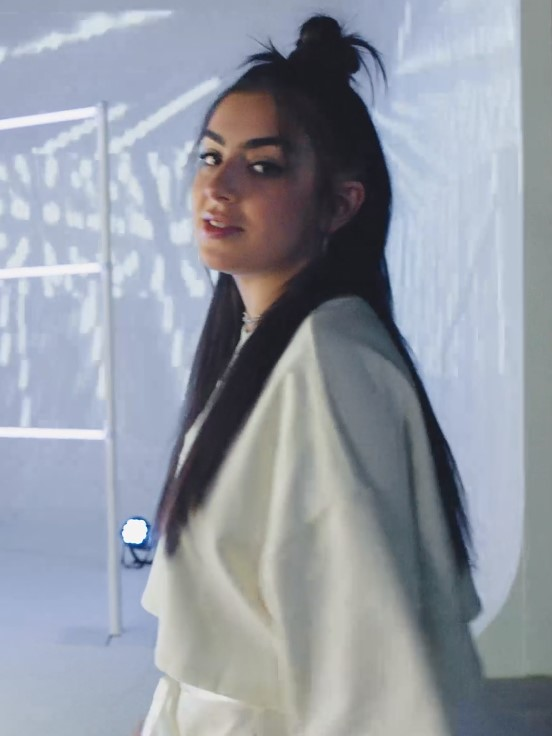
MØ collaborated with several artists including Diplo (left) and Charli XCX (right) in Forever Neverland.

A year after the release of MØ's debut album, No Mythologies to Follow (2014), MØ announced that she is working on her new album. On 15 October 2015, MØ released her single "Kamikaze" and it has reached the top 40 in Belgium and Denmark. On 13 May 2016, she released "Final Song", originally intended for her second album. "Final Song" reached the top 5 in Denmark, and the top 20 in Australia, Norway, and the United Kingdom. Later she worked with Sophie, Benny Blanco and Cashmere Cat on "Nights with You", the planned fourth single of the album, which premiered on MistaJam's BBC Radio 1. It was released on 21 April 2017. On 1 January 2018, MØ explained in an interview how her life has been changed after gaining international recognition for her collaboration with Major Lazer and DJ Snake on "Lean On".

Later she once again collaborated with Major Lazer for "Cold Water", also featuring Canadian singer Justin Bieber. She said in a press release that creating her EP When I Was Young was a nostalgic process that reminded her of the joy of songwriting and crafting a creative universe. She acknowledged that the new tracks might differ from what listeners expected after her collaborations with Major Lazer, but considered that contrast a positive aspect. She explained that after the success of "Lean On" and "Cold Water", she wanted to release personal songs before continuing work on her long-developing second album.

The 17-track Forever Neverland sees MØ collaborating with both past and new artists, including Diplo, Charli XCX, Empress Of, Two Feet, and What So Not. In a press statement, MØ said that she enjoyed working with Diplo because their collaborations always felt creative and free, and she was consistently pleased with the results. During the album's production, MØ said she often listened to other female solo artists for inspiration, including Tove Lo, Lana Del Rey, Santigold, and Tove Styrke. She cited as influential in shaping the sound and direction of Forever Neverland.

== Composition ==
Forever Neverland is a pop album brimming with thick beats and tropical electronics, with reviews describing it as a blend of energetic and emotive pop, combining pulsating Scandipop with uplifting Balearic influences. Writing for Dork, a reviewer described Forever Neverland as a "sublime pop album", highlighting that "skipping vacuous notions of perfection to present herself as the real deal" was perhaps its most subversive and interesting quality. Tracks like "Way Down" and "Nostalgia" feature tribal percussion and MØ's raw vocal style, creating lively and intense songs. "Blur" stands out for its combination of a guitar melody reminiscent of the Pixies and dynamic electronic production, while "Sun in Our Eyes" and the trip-hop influenced "Purple Like the Summer Rain" bring more melancholic tones. Although some tracks such as "Beautiful Wreck" and the EDM-inspired elements may feel formulaic or less engaging, the album maintains variety with moments like the Charli XCX collaboration on "If It's Over" and the reggae-influenced "Red Wine". Some tracks, such as the R&B-inspired "I Want You," received more mixed responses, being seen as less distinctive.

Compared to the more concise When I Was Young EP, Forever Neverland reflects a broad spectrum of recent pop trends combined with dense, detailed production. However, this density sometimes overshadows a distinct personality or voice, with lyrics that can feel somewhat generic and production that leans heavily on loudness and repeated climaxes. MØ has noted that nostalgia is a key theme throughout the album, inspired by reflecting on her past experiences during a period of extensive touring away from home. This retrospective perspective shaped much of her songwriting on the record.

== Title ==
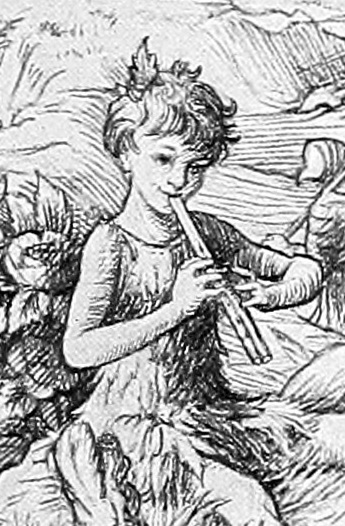
The title Forever Neverland was inspired by the story of Peter Pan.

The album's title, Forever Neverland, was inspired by the story of Peter Pan and reflects themes of escapism and the tension between fantasy and reality. Nylon described it as symbolic of the darker side of refusing to grow up and face responsibility, noting that MØ uses the title ironically to emphasize that Neverland is "not a good place to be". In doing so, she highlights both the temptation of retreating into a comforting illusion and the danger of denying reality.

== Release and promotion ==
On 12 July 2018, MØ teased her second album with the release of her new single "Sun in Our Eyes". On 7 September, she revealed the album's cover and that the album would be released on 19 October 2018, through Chess Club Records, RCA Victor, and Columbia Records. It was also revealed that the other previous singles, "Kamikaze", "Final Song" and "Nights with You", would only be available in the Japanese edition.

=== Singles ===
On 28 March 2018, MØ released the single "Nostalgia" for streaming and digital download. MØ released the official vertical music video on 3 May 2018 via YouTube.

On 12 July 2018, "Sun in Our Eyes" was released as the album's lead single. It peaked at number 17 on the Flemish Ultratop chart and at number 29 on New Zealand's Hot 40 Singles. Music video for "Sun in Our Eyes" was released on 8 August 2018. On 7 September 2018, "Way Down" was released as the album's second single, alongside the album's track listing. On 21 September 2018, "Imaginary Friend" was released as the album's third single. The official music video was released on the same day. "Blur" was released on 15 October 2018 as the album's fourth single.

=== Tour ===
MØ announced the Forever Neverland World Tour in support of the album, which began with a show in Hamburg on 9 November 2018. The North American leg started on 15 January 2019, in Washington, D.C., and concluded on 9 February in San Francisco, California. The tour launched with support from Abra, while Mykki Blanco joined as the supporting act for the West Coast leg.

== Critical reception ==
Forever Neverland ratings
Aggregate scores
Source	Rating
AnyDecentMusic?	6.9/10
Metacritic	69/100
Review scores
Source	Rating
AllMusic	3/5 stars
Clash	8/10
Consequence	C+
DIY	4/5 stars
The Independent	3/5 stars
The Line of Best Fit	8.5/10
NME	4/5 stars
The Guardian	2/5 stars
Pitchfork	6.0/10
The Skinny	5/5 stars

At Metacritic, which assigns a weighted average score out of 100 to reviews from mainstream critics, the album received an average score of 69, based on 13 reviews, indicating "generally favorable reviews".

Jamie MacMillan of Dork gave Forever Neverland a 5 out of 5 rating, praising its emotional vulnerability and describing it as "painfully honest at times", noting that MØ shows no hesitation in leaving herself emotionally exposed. Harriet Willis of The Skinny praised the album as a work that establishes MØ as a distinctive artist in her own right, rather than simply a frequent collaborator. Malvika Padin of Clash described the album as "fascinating" and engaging throughout, though she found tracks like "Beautiful Wreck" comparatively bland beside its bolder moments. Will Richards of DIY noted that while the album lacks the scale of "Lean On", MØ is beginning to forge a distinct identity by confidently following her own path. The Times described the album as one that could compete for the title of best pop record of the year alongside Sway by Tove Styrke and Camila Cabello's solo debut, reaffirming MØ's status as a leading pop innovator.

Writing for Pitchfork, Dani Blum summarised that most of the tracks on Forever Neverland are too "oversaturated and exhausting" with only occasional moments of "real shimmer". Neil Z. Yeung of AllMusic gave the album 3 out of 5 stars, noting that while it offers some catchy moments, it largely fits the typical sound of 2010s alt-pop. Emily Mackay of The Guardian described MØ's second album as containing some standout tracks, such as "Way Down" and "Blur", but ultimately considered it "too damp a squib" to fully establish her as a solo artist.

Sam Van Pykeren of Mother Jones named it the 6th best album of 2018. Mike Wass of Idolator placed it at number 8 on the "25 Best Albums of 2018" list. Billboard included it on the "20 Best Album Covers of 2018" list.

== Track listing ==
Forever Neverland – standard edition
No.	Title	Writer(s)	Producer(s)	Length
1.	"Intro (Purple Like the Summer Rain)"	Karen Marie Ørsted; Ajay Bhattacharya; Adam Feeney; Kurtis Mckenzie; Michael "Scribz" Riley	Stint; Frank Dukes; McKenzie	0:45
2.	"Way Down"	Ørsted; Bhattacharya; Cara Salimando; Alexandra Shungudzo Govere; Letter Mbulu; Caiphus Semenya	Stint	3:08
3.	"I Want You"	Ørsted; Bhattacharya; Sarah Aarons	Stint	3:16
4.	"Blur"	Ørsted; Bhattacharya; Kristoffer "Bonn" Fogelmark; Albin Nedler	Stint; Fogelmark; Nedler	3:04
5.	"Nostalgia"	Ørsted; Bhattacharya; Jonathan Hill; McKenzie; Riley; Cass Lowe	Stint; McKenzie	3:46
6.	"Sun in Our Eyes" (with Diplo)	Ørsted; Thomas Wesley Pentz; Hill; Henry Allen; Ilsey Juber	Diplo; Hill; King Henry	3:37
7.	"Mercy" (featuring What So Not and Two Feet)	Ørsted; Christopher Emerson; James Flannigan; Jaramaye Daniels; Georgia Overton	What So Not; Flannigan; Two Feet^{[c]}	3:41
8.	"If It's Over" (featuring Charli XCX)	Ørsted; Mikkel Eriksen; Tor Hermansen; Charlotte Aitchison; Ross Birchard; Ori Kaplan; Jocelyn Donald	StarGate; Tim Blacksmith^{[d]}; DannyD^{[d]}	3:39
9.	"West Hollywood" (Interlude)	Ørsted; Bhattacharya	Stint	1:07
10.	"Beautiful Wreck"	Ørsted; Bhattacharya; Fogelmark; Nedler; Madison Love	Stint; Fogelmark; Nedler	3:49
11.	"Red Wine" (featuring Empress Of)	Ørsted; Bhattacharya; Daniel "MantraBeats" Mizrahi; Lorely Rodriguez; Jesus Ferrera	Stint; MantraBeats; DalePlay	3:22
12.	"Imaginary Friend"	Ørsted; Carlos Montagnese; William Walsh; Jonnali Parmenius	Illangelo	3:47
13.	"Trying to Be Good"	Ørsted; Bhattacharya	Stint	3:46
14.	"Purple Like the Summer Rain"	Ørsted; Bhattacharya; Feeney; McKenzie; Riley	Stint; Dukes; McKenzie	4:01
Total length:				44:48

Forever Neverland – Japanese CD edition
No.	Title	Writer(s)	Producer(s)	Length
15.	"Final Song"	Ørsted; Parmenius; Uzoechi Emenike	MNEK	3:55
16.	"Kamikaze"	Ørsted; Pentz; Mads Damsgaard Kristiansen; Philip Meckseper; Boaz de Jong	Diplo; Jr Blender; Boaz van de Beatz	3:30
17.	"Nights with You"	Ørsted; Benjamin Levin; Magnus August Høiberg; Ryan Tedder; Sophie Xeon	Sophie; Benny Blanco; Cashmere Cat	3:17
Total length:				55:30

=== Notes ===
- ^{^[c]} signifies a vocal producer.
- ^{^[d]} signifies an executive producer.
- All album vocal production work was handled by Erik Eger, Andy Steinway, and Dillon Zachara, except where noted.

== Personnel ==
Credits were adapted from AllMusic.

- MØ – primary artist, composer
- Diplo – primary artist, producer
- Charli XCX – featured artist
- Empress Of – featured artist
- Two Feet – featured artist
- What So Not – featured artist, producer
- Adam Feeney – composer
- Ajay Bhattacharya – composer
- Albin Nedler – composer
- Alexandra Govere – composer
- Caiphus Semenya – composer
- Cara Salimando – composer
- Carlo "Illangelo" Montagnese – composer, mixing, producer
- Cass Lowe – composer
- Charlotte Aitchison – composer
- Chris Athens – mastering
- Chris Galland – mixing engineer
- Christopher Emerson – composer
- Clare Gillen – photography
- Collin Fletcher – artwork, design
- DalePlay – producer
- Frank Dukes – producer
- Fryd Frydendahl – photography
- Georgia Ku – composer
- Henry Allen – composer
- James Flannigan – composer, producer
- Jamie Snell – mixing
- Jaramye Daniels – composer
- Jesus Ferrera – composer
- Jocelyn Donald – composer
- John Hill – composer, producer
- King Henry – producer
- Kristoffer Fogelmark – composer
- Kurtis McKenzie – composer, producer
- Letta Mbulu – composer
- Lorely Rodriguez – composer
- Madison Love – composer
- Manny Marroquin – mixing
- Mantra – composer, producer
- Mike "Scribz" Riley – composer, producer
- Monkey Business – producer
- Noonie Bao – composer
- Ori Kaplan – composer
- Robin Florent – assistant
- Ross Birchard – composer
- Sarah Aarons – composer
- Scott Desmarais – assistant
- Stargate – producer
- Stint – executive producer, producer
- Thomas Wesley Pentz – composer
- Tor Erik Hermansen – composer
- William Walsh – composer

== Charts ==
Chart performance
Chart (2018)	Peak position
Belgian Albums (Ultratop Flanders)	191
Belgian Albums (Ultratop Wallonia)	158
Danish Albums (Hitlisten)	1
Dutch Albums (Album Top 100)	167
UK Album Downloads (Official Charts)	66

== Certifications ==
Certifications
Region	Certification	Certified units/sales
Denmark (IFPI Danmark)	Gold	10,000^{‡}
^{‡} Sales+streaming figures based on certification alone.

== Release history ==
Release dates and formats
Region	Date	Format	Version	Label	Ref.
Various	19 October 2018	Digital download; streaming	Original	Chess Club; RCA Victor; Columbia	
Europe	19 October 2018	12" vinyl	Original	Chess Club; RCA Victor; Columbia	
Europe	19 October 2018	CD	Original	Chess Club; RCA Victor; Columbia	
Japan	24 October 2018	CD	Japanese deluxe edition	Chess Club; RCA Victor; Columbia	
