= Losing My Life =

2018 single by Falling in Reverse

Single by Falling in Reverse
- Released: June 26, 2018
- Recorded: 2018
- Length: 5:00
- Label: Epitaph
- Songwriters: Ronald Joseph Radke; Cody Stewart; Tyler Smyth
- Producers: Tyler Smyth; Ronnie Radke

Falling in Reverse singles chronology
"Losing My Mind" (2018)	"Losing My Life" (2018)	"Drugs" (2019)

Music video
- "Losing My Life" on YouTube

"Losing My Life" is a song by American rock band Falling in Reverse. It was released on June 26, 2018, through Epitaph Records. The song is the continuation of the previous single "Losing My Mind". The song was re-released on April 8, 2019, as part of the Drugs EP. This is the last single to feature keyboardist, guitarist, and former bassist Zakk Sandler, and the only one to feature drummer Brandon "Rage" Richter.

== Promotion and release ==
Following the release of the single "Losing My Mind", the band was expected to announce their upcoming fifth studio album following the release of their fourth studio album Coming Home. However, after both singles were released, vocalist and bandleader Ronnie Radke announced that no albums would be released for a long time, and that they would only focus on releasing singles or EPs.

The single was announced days before it was released, the preview video showed some scenes where the music video was recorded and moat a grave that marked the year 2033. The single was then released, with its music video on YouTube reaching one million views in just one week. Vocalist Ronnie Radke spoke about the song:

"‘Losing My Life’ is the continuation of where ‘Losing My Mind’ ended. [It’s] the dichotomies and ironic parallels between self-reflection and the self-destructive nature that we as humans face on a daily basis in modern times."

The music video presents a new lineup in the band, bassist Zakk Sandler became the keyboardist and guitarist, Tyler Burgess was the new bassist who had already worked in the band as lead guitarist, replacing Christian Thompson on some tours. Additionally, the new members were Max Georgiev as lead guitarist, Georgiev had worked with bands like Escape the Fate, New Years Day, among others, and Brandon "Rage" Richter as the new drummer, Richter had previously worked with Motionless in White and A Skylit Drive.

== Composition and lyrics ==
"Losing My Life" is the continuation of "Losing My Mind", Ronnie Radke spoke about the lyrics of the song: "It be constant judgments from our peers, not being good enough, to not knowing who to trust, I’ve come to the realization that we are all the same at our core. Yet, ironically, we project our fears in the form of hate onto each other". Radke said: "Bouncing between dimensions, as the video portrays, there are two of me that are polar opposites of each other: one trying to prove to the world he is good enough, and the other trying to stop him from it. He ultimately kills his 'reflection' — the mirrored entity negating his progress by inter-dimensional time travel— only to find that the other version of 'him' he kills comes back to life, regenerating the feelings again. It's my analogy of the cyclical battle we all face on a day to day basis. However, this underlying message can be translated in many different ways. It's all in the eyes and ears of the beholder." Ronnie Radke's rap influences are reflected in this song. Like the previous single, this song continues the rap era in the band but this time with choruses and heavier riffs, including a bridge in the song accompanied by a breakdown that marks the return of the metalcore style and gutturals to the band.

== Music video ==
The music video was released the same day the single was released and was directed by Ethan Lader. In the music video it can be shown that Ronnie fights with his other person which seems to be the version of Ronnie that appears in the video for "Losing My Mind", it also shows us a part where Ronnie's daughter, Willow Radke, appears, who asks him why he went to prison. In other scenes an actress appears who represents Willow but in her adult version in the year 2033 trying to revive her father.

== Personnel ==
- Ronnie Radke – lead vocals, producer, engineer, composition
- Derek Jones – rhythm guitar, backing vocals
- Zakk Sandler – keyboards, synth, rhythm guitar, backing vocals, percussion
- Tyler Burgess – bass, backing vocals
- Max Georgiev – lead guitar, backing vocals
- Brandon "Rage" Richter – drums, percussion
- Tyler Smyth – producer
- Charles Kallaghan Massabo – engineer, co-producer, beat
