= Drug Island =

Island in Alaska, United States

Coordinates: 54°57′55″N 131°24′45″W

Drug Island is an island in Ketchikan Gateway Borough, Alaska, in the United States. Drug Island is about 200 feet (61 m) across.

Drug Island was named in 1920, but it is unclear why the name "Drug Island" was applied to this island.
