= 3AM (Pull Up) =

Promotional single by Charli XCX featuring MØ
- Released: 20 April, 2017
- Genre: Dancehall; synth-pop; tropical house; bubblegum pop
- Length: 3:59
- Label: Asylum; Atlantic
- Songwriters: Charlotte Aitchison; Karen Marie Ørsted; A. G. Cook; Finn Keane
- Producer: Easy FX

Lyric video
- "3 AM (Pull Up)" on YouTube

"3AM (Pull Up)" is a song recorded by British singer Charli XCX, written for her mixtape Number 1 Angel (2017). The song features Danish singer MØ. The song received positive reviews from critics, with some considering it a highlight of the mixtape.

== Composition ==
"3AM (Pull Up)" has been described as a bubbly synth-pop, tropical house and dancehall song. According to Pitchfork, the song's lyrical content contains an entire emotional arc. Rolling Stone observed that the lyrics described a "the throes of a so-bad-it's-good relationship." The single also shows Charli XCX resisting the guy she keeps "backsliding" to, and contemplating the feeling of being a "booty call."

== Release ==
"3AM (Pull Up)" was one of three songs (the others being "Lipgloss" and "Dreamer") that were shared preceding the release of Number 1 Angel.

== Critical reception ==
"3AM (Pull Up)" received positive reviews from music critics. Billboard called the song "an album highlight", giving praise to MØ's guest appearance on the song. NME called the song "hugely fun". Ahead of the release of her 2022 album Crash, Consequence of Sound ranked the song as Charli XCX's sixth best song.

== Chart performance ==
Despite not being released as a single, it reached #9 on the New Zealand Heatseekers chart.

Chart (2017)	Peak position
New Zealand Heatseekers (RMNZ)	9
