= Pop 2 (mixtape) =

Mixtape by Charli XCX
- Released: 15 December 2017
- Recorded: 13 May 2017; June 2017; September–November 2017
- Genres: Dance-pop; experimental pop; synth-pop; hyperpop; avant-garde
- Length: 40:26
- Label: Asylum
- Producers: A. G. Cook; EasyFun; Life Sim; King Henry; Lil Data; Sophie; Umru; Ö

Charli XCX chronology
Number 1 Angel (2017)	Pop 2 (2017)	Charli (2019)

Singles from Pop 2
- 1. "Out of My Head" Released: 8 December 2017

Pop 2 is the fourth mixtape by British singer Charli XCX, released on 15 December 2017 by Asylum Records. Executively produced by A. G. Cook of PC Music, sessions for the mixtape began several months before its release and featured a wide variety of guest contributions. The mixtape was backed by its only single "Out of My Head" featuring Alma and Tove Lo, released exactly one week before its release.

Pop 2 was acclaimed by critics upon its release; some reviewers went on to call it her best body of work yet. Its innovative blend of electronic music influences was generally praised by reviewers. In 2019, Pitchfork ranked the album 40th in its list of "The 200 Best Albums of the 2010s".

== Background ==
In December 2014, before the release of her sophomore album Sucker, Charli XCX revealed she was already planning her third studio album. She stated that it would be inspired by Japanese pop music and sound like "another planet up in the clouds" and "intensely weird and childlike". In July 2015, she shared in an interview that she had begun working on her third album with British producer Sophie in Los Angeles and described it as "the most pop thing, and the most electronic thing" she had ever done. BloodPop and Stargate were also confirmed to be involved in the album's production. In July and August 2015, Charli XCX co-headlined Charli and Jack Do America Tour, a US tour with Jack Antonoff, but on 21 August she announced that, for "personal reasons", a planned second leg of the tour would not go ahead.

"At the time I felt scared to talk about it. It felt like an invasion of my life, my personal space, my personal property. It was just really sad, and I was really hurt."

— Charli XCX talking about the leaking of her third album.

In October 2015, Charli XCX released the song "Vroom Vroom" on the Beats 1 radio show, then claiming it would be the first song released from her third studio album. On 26 February 2016, the Vroom Vroom EP was released, under Charli XCX's own imprint record label, Vroom Vroom Recordings. All songs on the EP were produced by Sophie. That July, it was announced that British producer A. G. Cook, founder of record label PC Music, had signed on as Charli XCX's creative director, and the following month, she announced in an interview with The Fader that her album was finished and would be released in 2017. When describing the project, Charli XCX stated the album would be split into two sides, half being "straight-up pop" and the other half being "club-orientated". In October 2016, the album was confirmed for a May 2017 release, and the lead single "After the Afterparty" was released.

Several new tracks were premiered live over the following months, including "Roll with Me", "No Angel", and "Bounce", however in February 2017, it was announced that the album was delayed and expected to be released that September instead. In lieu of the delayed album, she announced a new mixtape titled Number 1 Angel would be released in February, recorded within two weeks with Cook without permission from her record label, Atlantic; meanwhile, unreleased Charli XCX tracks began to leak on the internet. The mixtape was delayed until March due to label conflicts. In May 2017, the album was delayed again with an expected release date for spring 2018, and a second single, "Boys", was released along with a music video directed by Charli XCX herself, with additional direction from Sarah McColgan. The video, which featured cameos from a wide variety of male celebrities, including Joe Jonas and Wiz Khalifa, went viral, racking up almost 3 million views within a day. During August, more leaks from the album sessions appeared online, and the project was scrapped.

== Recording ==
Recording for Pop 2 began in September 2017, just two months before the mixtape was to be completed, with Charli XCX reaching out to producer and PC Music founder A. G. Cook to suggest they work on a new project following their previous mixtape Number 1 Angel (2017) appointing him as executive producer. Cook stated that "we wanted it to feel like a complete restart in terms of the image and style of it" in comparison to their previous project. The majority of recording took place in Alicia Keys' old New York studio, with other sessions occurring in London. Charli XCX extensively utilised Auto-Tune, which Cook experimented with and manipulated on particular tracks. She stated that "the mixtape is in this very free, fast, and experimental world. But it's also still intended to be pop. It's what I naturally gravitate towards."

Collaborations which appear on the record include Canadian singer Carly Rae Jepsen, Brazilian singer and drag queen Pabllo Vittar, Estonian rapper Tommy Cash, German pop singer Kim Petras and Korean-American hip hop artist Jay Park among others. Charli XCX stated that "this mixtape isn't necessarily about me – it's really about giving everybody their moment to own the song." The mixtape was to feature a contribution from rapper Lil Peep, which was shelved following his death in November. Charli XCX cited being signed to a major label and potential pressure from the public as reasons for Pop 2 being a mixtape.

A reworked version of "Track 10", titled "Blame It on Your Love" and featuring American singer and rapper Lizzo, was later released in May 2019 as the second single from her third studio album Charli.

== Singles ==
The first single from Pop 2, "Out of My Head" featuring Tove Lo and Alma was released on 8 December 2017 along the pre-order of the mixtape on digital platforms.

=== Promotional singles ===
The song "Unlock It" featuring Kim Petras and Jay Park was premiered on 11 December 2017 on radio program Beats 1, being named its release day's World Record. Another track, "I Got It" featuring Brooke Candy, Cupcakke and Pabllo Vittar, was released on 13 December 2017 as the final promotional single before the mixtape's official release. On 31 October 2019, "Porsche" featuring MØ was released as a promotional single.

== Critical reception ==
Professional ratings
Aggregate scores
Source	Rating
AnyDecentMusic?	7.7/10
Metacritic	84/100
Review scores
Source	Rating
Consequence of Sound	B+
Crack Magazine	8/10
Exclaim!	7/10
Financial Times	4/5 stars
The Guardian	4/5 stars
NME	4/5 stars
Pitchfork	8.4/10
Q	4/5 stars
Spectrum Culture	4/5 stars
Tiny Mix Tapes	4/5 marks

At review aggregate site Metacritic, Pop 2 has an average score of 84 out of 100, based on eight reviews, indicating "universal acclaim". Meaghan Garvey of Pitchfork, who gave the album an 8.4/10, called it "the best full-length work of both Charli and PC Music's respective careers," opining that "though Pop 2 sounds like the future, even more delightful is the way it hybridizes sounds from the past two decades of weirdo electronics." Ludovic Hunter-Tilney of the Financial Times wrote that Charli XCX "stands out as a paragon of progressiveness," adding that "on the majority of the tracks Charli and her producer Cook deploy their meta-pop tactics with a skilful sense of dramatic engagement." The Guardian's Alexis Petridis remarked that the mixtape did "an impressive job of convincing you that Charli XCX is infinitely better when freed from record company interference" and found Cook's production to be "adventurous" and infused with "wilful modernity".

In 2019, Pitchfork ranked the album 40th in its list of "The 200 Best Albums of the 2010s". In the album's entry, Hazel Cills considered it Charli XCX's "best full-length to date" and felt that throughout it, she "solidifies her mastery of the strange, wonderful new pop world she continues to build."

== Pop 2 Tour ==
Pop 2 Tour
Date	City	Country	Venue
15 March 2018	Los Angeles	United States	El Rey Theatre
18 March 2018	New York City	United States	Elsewhere
19 June 2018	London	United Kingdom	Village Underground
20 June 2018	Paris	France	La Maroquinerie
23 October 2018	Sydney	Australia	The Metro

In addition to the Pop 2 performances, Charli XCX additionally hosted and performed at numerous afterparties during Taylor Swift's Reputation Stadium Tour during this period, further promoting the mixtape and singles.

== Track listing ==
No.	Title	Writer(s)	Producer(s)	Length
1.	"Backseat" (featuring Carly Rae Jepsen)	Charlotte Aitchison; Alexander Guy Cook; Finn Keane; Jepsen	Cook; EasyFun	3:58
2.	"Out of My Head" (featuring Tove Lo and Alma)	Aitchison; Sophie Xeon; Cook; Tove Lo; Alma-Sofia Miettinen	Sophie; Cook	3:55
3.	"Lucky"	Aitchison; Cook; Ö	Cook; Ö	3:35
4.	"Tears" (featuring Caroline Polachek)	Aitchison; Cook; Polachek	Cook	4:13
5.	"I Got It" (featuring Brooke Candy, Cupcakke and Pabllo Vittar)	Aitchison; Cook; Elizabeth Harris; Jesse St. John Geller; Phabullo Rodrigues da Silva	Cook; umru	3:51
6.	"Femmebot" (featuring Dorian Electra and Mykki Blanco)	Cook; David Gamson; Keane; Fransisca Hall; Blanco	Cook; EasyFun; Gamson	3:38
7.	"Delicious" (featuring Tommy Cash)	Aitchison; Cook; Tomas Tammemets	Cook	4:32
8.	"Unlock It" (featuring Kim Petras and Jay Park)	Aitchison; Cook; Petras; Park	Cook; Life Sim	3:52
9.	"Porsche" (featuring MØ)	Aitchison; Cook; Henry Agincourt Allen; Cassia O'Reilly; Karen Ørsted	King Henry; Cook; EasyFun	3:26
10.	"Track 10"	Aitchison; Cook; Mikkel Eriksen; Tor Hermansen; Jonnali Parmenius; Alexandra Yatchenko	Cook; Lil Data; Life Sim	5:26
Total length:				40:26

Notes

- "Delicious" features a brief sample of Charli XCX's 2014 single "Boom Clap", with the song being depicted as a phone ringtone.
- "Unlock It" samples A. G. Cook's 2014 single "Beautiful". Following the resurgence of the song's popularity on TikTok, it was retitled "Unlock It (Lock It)" on streaming platforms in May 2021.
- A later vinyl release included all ten tracks of Pop 2 combined with the ten tracks of Number 1 Angel.

== Personnel ==
Musicians

- Charli XCX – lead vocals
- A. G. Cook – programming (all tracks), synthesizer (6), executive producer, engineer (3, 5–8)
- EasyFun – programming (1, 6, 9), synthesizer (6)
- Sophie – programming (2)
- Ö – backing vocals and programming (3)
- David Gamson – synthesizer and programming (6)
- Umru – programming (5)
- Caroline Polachek – backing vocals (7)
- Life Sim – synthesizer (8, 10)
- King Henry – programming (9)
- Lil Data – synthesizer (10)
- Noonie Bao – backing vocals (10)

Production

- Stuart Hawkes – mastering engineer
- Geoff Swan – mixer
- Noah Passovoy – engineer (2)
- Brendan Morawski – engineer (3, 4, 6–8)
- Stargate – vocal producers (10)

== Charts ==
Chart performance for Pop 2
Chart (2023-2026)	Peak position
Australian Vinyl Albums (ARIA)	8
Belgian Albums (Ultratop Wallonia)	169
German Albums (Offizielle Top 100)	78
Hungarian Albums (MAHASZ)	34
Scottish Albums (Official Charts)	6
