= MØ =

Danish singer (born 1988)

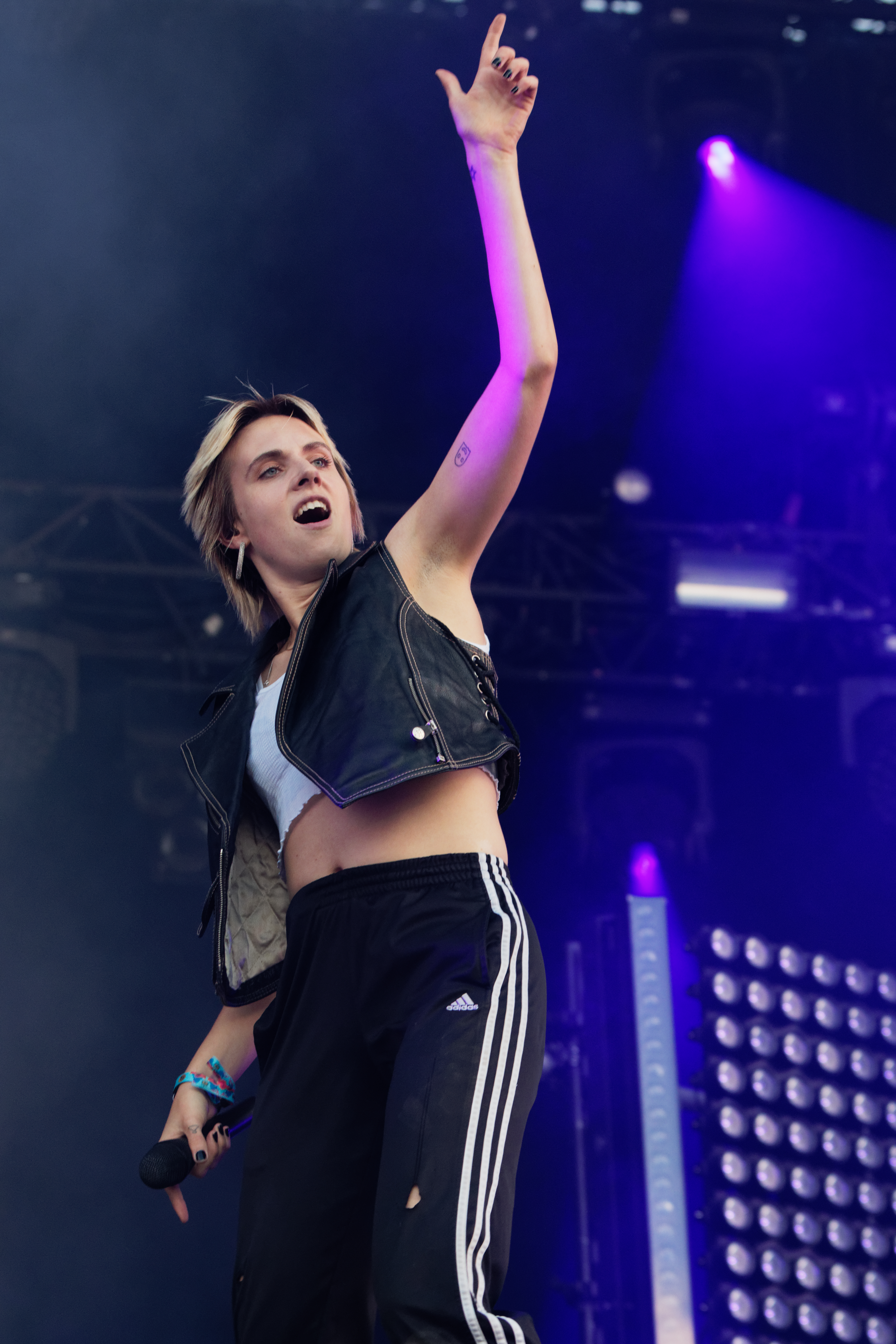
- MØ in 2018
- Born: Karen Marie Aagaard Ørsted Andersen; 13 August 1988 (age 38); Ubberud, Odense, Denmark
- Other name: Karen Ørsted
- Occupations: Singer; songwriter
- Years active: 2006–present
- Musical career
- Genres: Electronic; electropop; synth-pop; EDM; indie pop
- Instrument: Vocals
- Labels: Sony; Chess Club; RCA Victor; Columbia
- Formerly of: MOR
- Website: momomoyouth.com

Karen Marie Aagaard Ørsted Andersen (Danish pronunciation: [ˈkɑːɑn mɑˈʁiˀə ˈɔːˀkɒˀ ˈɶɐ̯steð ˈɑnɐsn̩]; born 13 August 1988), known professionally as MØ (pronounced [ˈmøˀ]) is a Danish singer and songwriter. She signed a recording contract with Sony Music in 2012 and released her debut extended play (EP), Bikini Daze (2013), and her debut studio album, No Mythologies to Follow (2014).

In 2014, MØ collaborated with Australian rapper Iggy Azalea on the single "Beg for It", which peaked at number 27 on the US Billboard Hot 100, earning MØ her first entry on the chart. The following year, she co-wrote and provided vocals for the Major Lazer and DJ Snake collaboration "Lean On", which became an international success, charting at number one in multiple countries, number two in the United Kingdom, and number four in the United States. In 2016, MØ was featured on Snakehips's single "Don't Leave", and another Major Lazer single "Cold Water" with Canadian singer Justin Bieber; the latter debuted at number one on the UK singles chart and number two on the Hot 100.

MØ earned her first commercially successful solo single with 2016's "Final Song", which reached the top 10 in Denmark and Norway and the top 15 in Australia and the United Kingdom. She has since released the EP When I Was Young (2017), and the studio albums Forever Neverland (2018), Motordrome (2022) and Plæygirl (2025).

== Life and career ==
=== Early life ===
Karen Marie Aagaard Ørsted Andersen was born in Ubberud, near Odense, and she grew up in Ejlstrup on the island of Funen, Denmark. Her father, Frans Ørsted, is a psychologist, and her mother, Mette Ørsted, is a teacher. She has an older brother, Kasper, who is a doctor.

MØ was seven when she became interested in music thanks to the Spice Girls. As a teenager, she became interested in punk music and anti-fascist movements, listening to Black Flag, Nirvana, The Smashing Pumpkins, Yeah Yeah Yeahs and especially Sonic Youth, saying she looked up to Kim Gordon as a "big hero and role model".

=== 2006–2012: Side projects and MORE ===
In 2006, MØ released an EP, The Edmunds, which was composed of three songs. She also released several other side projects during 2008–10, including A Piece of Music to Fuck to and The Rarities. MØ and her friend, Josefine Struckmann Pedersen, formed duo MOR in 2007. They released two EPs, Fisse I Dit Fjæs (Pussy in Your Face) and Vanvidstimer (Madness Hours), in 2009 and 2011, respectively. MOR disbanded on 7 September 2012, for personal reasons.

=== 2012–2015: No Mythologies to Follow and collaborations ===
In 2012, MØ began creating a cappella pop songs and collaborating with producer Ronni Vindahl. On 14 January 2013, MØ released her debut single, "Glass". On 15 March, she released "Pilgrim" with the B-side track, "Maiden". "Pilgrim" was recognised as P3s Uundgåelige (P3 Unavoidable), a label given to rising artists by Danish radio station DR P3, and it peaked at number eleven on the Danish Singles Chart. On 27 March, she performed live on television at the Danish P3 Guld Awards. On 7 June, she released the single "Waste of Time". On 18 August, it was confirmed through producer and DJ Avicii's manager Ash Pournouri that MØ had co-written and provided vocals on a track called "Dear Boy", which was later featured on Avicii's debut album, True. On 30 August, she released the single "XXX 88". MØ's debut extended play, Bikini Daze, was released on 18 October. In October, she supported AlunaGeorge on UK tour dates.

The single "Don't Wanna Dance" debuted on BBC Radio 1 on 16 January 2014 as Zane Lowe's Hottest Record. On 7 March, MØ's debut studio album, No Mythologies to Follow, was released. It received a Metascore of 77 out of 100 on the review aggregate site Metacritic, indicating "generally favorable" reviews. Music blog Pretty Much Amazing called the album "complex and euphoric", while The Guardian noted that "what MØ lacks in originality, she makes up for with warlike ardour". The record debuted at number 58 on the UK Albums Chart, selling 1,438 copies in its first week. MØ began touring in Europe and the United States in support of the album, ending in June. On 2 June, she made her US television debut on Jimmy Kimmel Live!, where she performed "Don't Wanna Dance" and "Pilgrim". "Walk This Way" was released on 16 June as a single from No Mythologies to Follow. On 23 June, MØ announced additional United States and Canadian tour dates beginning in September. In November, she won four awards at the Danish Music Awards: Danish Album of the Year, Danish Solo Artist of the Year, Danish Breakthrough Artist of the Year and Danish Music Video of the Year. In October, MØ was featured on Australian rapper Iggy Azalea's song "Beg for It", released as the lead single from Azalea's reissue album, Reclassified. They performed the song for the first time on Saturday Night Live on 25 October. MØ was also featured on Elliphant's "One More", which was officially released as a single on 22 September; the official music video was released a day later, 23 September. MØ also co-wrote the song "All My Love" by Major Lazer, featuring vocals from American singer and songwriter Ariana Grande.

She also co-wrote and provided vocals for another Major Lazer song, "Lean On" with DJ Snake, released in March 2015. It topped the charts globally in MØ's native Denmark, Australia, Finland, Iceland, and the Netherlands, while reaching the top five in several countries, including France, Germany, Sweden, the United Kingdom and the United States. According to the IFPI, "Lean On" was the fifth best-selling song of 2015 worldwide, and one of the best-selling singles of all time, with global sales of 13.1 million. Spotify named it as the most streamed song of all time, and has over one billion streams globally as of June 2017. The music video for "Lean On" premiered on 30 April 2015, and became a viral success with over 2.5 billion views on YouTube, making it the 32nd most viewed video on the site.

=== 2015–2017: When I Was Young EP, and more collaborations ===
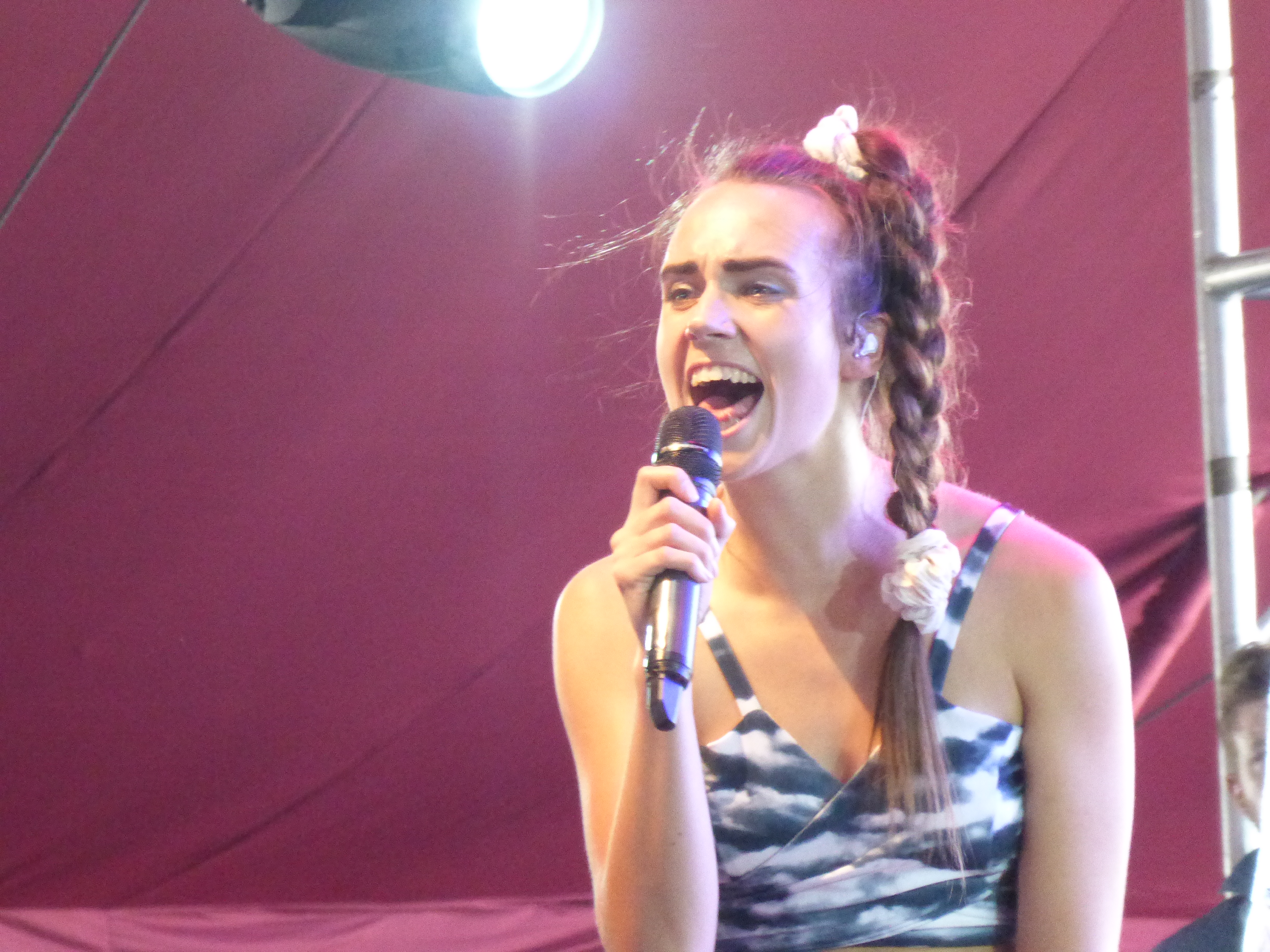
MØ performing at Coachella in 2015

On 1 October 2015, it was announced that the first single from MØ's upcoming second studio album, "Kamikaze", produced by Diplo, would be released on 15 October 2015. On 14 October, the single made its world premiere on a BBC Radio 1 segment hosted by Annie Mac before the studio version was released the following day. "Kamikaze" charted in Denmark, the United Kingdom, Australia and Belgium. On 13 May 2016, "Final Song", the second single from MØ's second album, was released and also made its world premiere on the same radio segment hosted by Mac. The song was co-written with Swedish singer Noonie Bao and English singer MNEK. It became MØ's first top 40 single as a lead artist in the United Kingdom, with the song reaching number 14 on the UK Singles Chart.

On 22 July, Major Lazer released the single "Cold Water" which features Canadian singer Justin Bieber and MØ. In the United States, "Cold Water" debuted at number two on the Billboard Hot 100, becoming MØ's second top 10 and her third top 40 single. It is also her highest-charting single in the United States, and she is the highest-charting Danish act along with Jørgen Ingmann ("Apache"). In the United Kingdom, "Cold Water" debuted at number one on the UK Singles Chart; it is the first time two Danish acts have reached number one in the same year, with the other being Lukas Graham's song, "7 Years".

On 17 September, MØ announced the release of her new track, titled "Drum"; it had made special appearances in previous concerts and shows. The song was produced by American producer Bloodpop also co-written by English singer Charli XCX, alongside Noonie Bao. In October, the song's official audio was released. On 6 January 2017, English electronic duo Snakehips premiered their new track, "Don't Leave", which features vocals from MØ. Its lyric video was released on the same day. On 10 March, she was featured on Charli XCX's "3AM (Pull Up)", taken from her mixtape, Number 1 Angel. MØ was also featured alongside Sophie on the song "9 (After Coachella)" by Cashmere Cat, the fifth single from his debut album, 9. "Nights with You", the third single from the singer's then-upcoming second studio album, was released on 21 April, after premiering on MistaJam's BBC Radio 1 show at the previous day.

On 26 October, MØ released her second extended play, titled When I Was Young, as a surprise release. It is composed of the songs that MØ wrote over the course of four years since the release of No Mythologies to Follow. On 30 October, she announced a co-headlining North American tour with Cashmere Cat, the Meøw Tour, in support of the EP; it took place from January to April 2018. In 2017, MØ co-wrote and provided vocals on Diplo's song "Get It Right", for the album Major Lazer Presents: Give Me Future. They both also performed the song on The Jimmy Fallon Show with an appearance from GoldLink. In December, MØ would go on to be featured on Charli XCX's second mixtape of 2017, Pop 2, on the second-to-last track, "Porsche."

=== 2018–2020: Forever Neverland, and more collaborations ===
In 2018, MØ collaborated with producer Jack Antonoff to provide vocals for the Love, Simon soundtrack with the song "Never Fall in Love". She also collaborated with Noah Cyrus on the song "We Are...", and was featured on Alma's Heavy Rules Mixtape with the song "Dance for Me". On 19 October 2018, Her second studio album, Forever Neverland was released by Columbia Records. The album was preceded by four singles: "Sun in Our Eyes" featuring Diplo, "Way Down", "Imaginary Friend", and "Blur". The album also features collaborations with Charli XCX, What So Not, Two Feet and Empress Of. It was revealed that other singles, "Kamikaze", "Final Song" and "Nights with You", would only be available on the Japanese edition of the album.

In 2019, MØ performed her single "Blur" on The Tonight Show Starring Jimmy Fallon. She co-wrote and provided vocals to "Theme Song (I'm Far Away)" for Moominvalley. She was the support act for Panic! at the Disco's tour across the United Kingdom. MØ performed at 2019's Glastonbury Festival and Roskilde Festival. In October 2019, she released her debut mixtape, MMMMØ - The Mix. MØ released her single "On & On" on 31 October 2019.

=== 2021–2023: Motordrome ===
MØ released "Live to Survive" on 28 May 2021, which serves as the lead single of her then upcoming third studio album. In July, she released "Kindness", announcing the album Motordrome and double singles "Brad Pitt" and "Goosebumps" in November.

On 28 January 2022, Motordrome was released via Sony Music UK, along with the fifth single, "New Moon". Same day, its music video appeared on MØ's YouTube channel. In late February, MØ went on tour to promote Motordrome across North America and Europe, opened for Imagine Dragons's tour Mercury World Tour in North America and played summer festivals in the Europe among others on Tinderbox, Mad Cool Festival and Way Out West Festival. On 17 June, MØ released "True Romance" as the first single from extended edition of Motordrome. She appeared in a Gryffin's song "Reckless" 12 days later. On 12 August, MØ released extended edition of the album, titled Motordrome - Dødsdrom Edition; a music video for "Spaceman" was released on MØ's YouTube channel same day. In November, MØ performed at Corona Capital on Mexico City as her last announced show that year.

On 11 August 2023, MØ released her next single "Attack of the Ghost Riders", a cover of the Raveonettes. On 20 September, MØ and Fryd Frydendahl published their book titled Racing – Circles of doubt, Squares of light.

=== 2024–present: 10th anniversary of No Mythologies to Follow and Plæygirl ===
On 23 January 2024, MØ announced that she was on the occasion of the 10th anniversary of No Mythologies to Follow and would release an extended version of the album. She also added new tour dates, third show in Copenhagen and fourth in London. On 26 January, a single titled "Fake Chanel", which was scrapped from No Mythologies to Follow, was released. It was co-written and produced by Vindahl. The single was later added to the tenth year anniversary edition of the album, which also includes three unreleased songs: "Bad Luck", "Anti Hero" and "Daydreams (Night Version)". On 15 and 16 March, MØ played a concert at Vega in Copenhagen to celebrate its 10th anniversary of the release.

In October, "Who Said" was released as the lead single from her fourth album; it was accompanied by an official visualiser, directed by Danish photographer Fryd Frydendahl. Its Ronni Vindahl edit and Sassy 009 remix were released on 22 November 2024. MØ released her cover of "Wake Me Up" by Avicii and Aloe Blacc on 6 December, as a homage to Avicii's legacy; it was also served with an accompanying visualiser. On 28 January 2025, she released her next single "Sweet", featuring Irish musician Biig Piig, announcing release of her fourth studio album Plæygirl, which would be released on 16 May. She unveiled three more singles from the album, "Keep Moving" (21 March 2025), "Lose Yourself" (2 May 2025) and "Heartbreak" (15 May 2025).

In 2026, MØ released a double single, "Hunnybån" and "Fine Curls". Prior to their release, she stated that she would temporarily step back from touring and live performances in order to prioritise her mental health and work on new music.

== Artistry ==
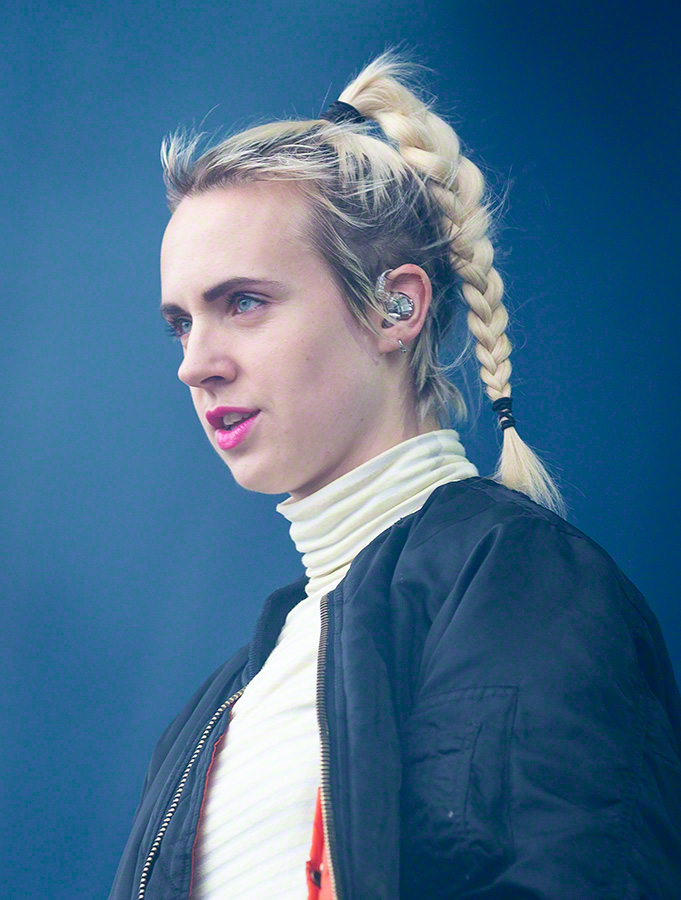
MØ in 2016

MØ said in an interview from Wonderland that her grandfather, Mogens Ørsted, who was an artist, would sign his initials on his paintings. Therefore, she decided to use the same initials for her stage name. The word "mø" means "maiden" or "virgin to life" in Danish. Her musical influences includes the Spice Girls, Sonic Youth, Kim Gordon, Björk, Thurston Moore, J Dilla, Dead Kennedys, Yeah Yeah Yeahs, Little Dragon, Santigold, Karen O, Bonobo, Patti Smith, Portishead, the Doors, the Smashing Pumpkins, the Clash, Wu-Tang Clan, and Major Lazer.

=== Musical style ===
MØ's music has been classified as electronic, electropop, synth-pop, and indie pop. She has been described as "electro music with guts". The Guardian described her music stating; "her music, muscular and melodic, is a hybrid of bouncy EDM drops and scandipop on steroids", while NME called her work a cross between Siouxsie Sioux and Janet Jackson. MØ has described her sound as "an organic yet dynamic mix of electro, indie-pop, soul and street vibes". She showcased different musical styles in her debut album, including indie pop, dream pop, dark pop, electronica and alternative R&B. Her second album, Forever Neverland, contains elements of tropical house, experimental, trip hop, alternative pop and dancehall, while her third album Motordrome features "electro-pop production". MØ's music has been compared to electropop artists like Grimes and Twin Shadow, and her vocals to those of Lana Del Rey.

== Discography ==
- No Mythologies to Follow (2014)
- Forever Neverland (2018)
- Motordrome (2022)
- Plæygirl (2025)

== Tours ==
=== Headlining ===
- Bikini Daze Tour (2013)
- No Mythologies to Follow Tour (2014)
- Fall Tour (2014)
- Untitled Tour (2016)
- When I Was Young Tour (2018)
- Forever Neverland World Tour (2018–2019)
- Motordrome World Tour: Chapter 1 (2022)
- No Mythologies to Follow 10th Anniversary Tour (2024)
- Plæygirl: Live (2025)

=== Co-headlining ===
- MØ and Cashmere Cat: The Meøw Tour (2017–2018)

=== Supporting ===
- AlunaGeorge – UK Tour (2013)
- Major Lazer – Free The Universe Tour (2013)
- Years & Years – Communion Tour (2016)
- Sia – Nostalgic for the Present Tour (2017)
- Panic! at the Disco – Pray for the Wicked Tour (2019)
- Imagine Dragons – Mercury Tour (2022)

== Awards and nominations ==
MØ awards and nominations
Awards and nominations
Award	Wins	Nominations
Årets Steppeulv Awards	3	3
Billboard Music Awards	1	1
Danish Music Awards	7	13
European Border Breakers Award	1	1
GAFFA-Prisen Awards	8	15
Gay Music Chart Awards	0	1
iHeartRadio Music Awards	0	1
International Dance Music Awards	1	2
MTV Europe Music Awards	0	4
MTV Video Music Awards	0	2
Nordic Music Prize	0	1
Rober Awards Music Poll	0	2
Sweden GAFFA Awards	0	1
UK Music Video Awards	0	1
WDM Radio Awards	0	2
Zulu Awards	1	1

Totals (Note: Certain award groups do not simply award one winner. They acknowledge several different recipients, have runners-up, and have third place. Since this is a specific recognition and is different from losing an award, runner-up mentions are considered wins in this award tally. For simplification and to avoid errors, each award in this list has been presumed to have had a prior nomination.)
- Wins: 24
- Nominations: 56

=== Årets Steppeulv Awards ===
Year	Category	Work	Outcome	Ref.
2014	Year Live Name	MØ	Won	
2015	Album of the Year	No Mythologies to Follow	Won	
2015	Composer of the Year	MØ (shared with Ronni Vindahl)	Won	

=== Billboard Music Awards ===
Year	Category	Work	Outcome	Ref.
2016	Top Dance/Electronic Song	"Lean On" (shared with Major Lazer and DJ Snake)	Won	

=== Danish Music Awards ===
Year	Category	Work	Outcome	Ref.
2014	New Danish Name	MØ	Won	
2014	Danish Soloist	MØ	Won	
2014	Danish Music Video	"Walk This Way"	Won	
2014	Danish Album	No Mythologies to Follow	Won	
2015	Danish Live	MØ	Nominated	
2016	Danish Songwriter	MØ	Nominated	
2016	Danish Hit	"Final Song"	Nominated	
2016	Danish Music Video	"Final Song"	Won	
2019	Danish Solo Artist	MØ	Nominated	
2019	Danish Songwriter	MØ	Won	
2019	Danish Album	Forever Neverland	Nominated	
2022	Danish Album	Motordrome	Nominated	
2022	Danish Songwriter	MØ	Won	
2024	Honorary Award (Ærespris)	MØ	Won	

=== Electronic Dance Music Awards ===
Year	Category	Work	Outcome	Ref.
2017	Single of the Year	"Cold Water"	Won	
2017	Best Extended Radio Edit	"Cold Water"	Nominated	
2017	Best Banger	"Cold Water" (Dark Intensity remix)	Nominated	
2017	Best Rise/Drop	"Cold Water" (Dark Intensity remix)	Nominated	
2017	Best Remix Collaboration	"Cold Water" (The Scene Kings, DJ Scene & Diggz remix)	Won	

=== European Border Breakers Awards ===
Year	Category	Work	Outcome	Ref.
2015	Emerging Artist	MØ	Won	

=== GAFFA-Prisen Awards ===
Year	Category	Work	Outcome	Ref.
2013	Best Danish Female Artist	MØ	Won	
2013	Best New Danish Artist	MØ	Won	
2014	Best Danish Album	No Mythologies to Follow	Won	
2014	Best Danish Female Artist	MØ	Won	
2014	Best Danish Hit	"Don't Wanna Dance"	Won	
2014	Best Danish Pop Album	No Mythologies to Follow	Won	
2015	Best International Hit	"Lean On" (shared with Major Lazer and DJ Snake)	Won	
2016	Best Danish Female Artist	MØ	Won	
2019	Best Danish Female Artist	MØ	Nominated	
2019	Best Danish Live Act	MØ	Nominated	
2019	Best Danish Album	Forever Neverland	Nominated	
2019	Best Danish Pop Album	Forever Neverland	Nominated	
2019	Best Danish Hit	"Blur"	Nominated	
2022	Best Danish Hit	"Live to Survive"	Nominated	
2022	Best Live Act	MØ	Nominated	

=== Gay Music Chart Awards ===
Year	Category	Work	Outcome	Ref.
2017	Best Danish Music Video	"Nights with You"	Nominated	

=== iHeartRadio Music Awards ===
Year	Category	Work	Outcome	Ref.
2017	Dance Song of the Year	"Cold Water" (shared with Major Lazer and Justin Bieber)	Nominated	

=== International Dance Music Awards ===
Year	Category	Work	Outcome	Ref.
2016	Best Commercial/Pop Dance Track	"Lean On"	Won	
2016	Best Featured Vocalist	"Lean On"	Nominated	

=== MTV Europe Music Awards ===
Year	Category	Work	Outcome	Ref.
2015	Best Song	"Lean On" (shared with Major Lazer and DJ Snake)	Nominated	
2016	Best Danish Act	MØ	Nominated	
2017	Best Danish Act	MØ	Nominated	
2022	Best Nordic Act	MØ	Nominated	

=== MTV Video Music Awards ===
Year	Category	Work	Outcome	Ref.
2016	Song of Summer	"Cold Water" (shared with Major Lazer and Justin Bieber)	Nominated	
2017	Best Dance	"Cold Water" (shared with Major Lazer and Justin Bieber)	Nominated	

=== mtvU Woodie Awards ===
Year	Category	Work	Outcome	Ref.
2017	Cover Woodie	"Love on the Brain"	Nominated	

=== Nordic Music Prize ===
Year	Category	Work	Outcome	Ref.
2014	Nordic Music Prize	No Mythologies to Follow	Nominated	

=== Rober Awards Music Poll ===
Year	Category	Work	Outcome	Ref.
2013	Best EP	Bikini Daze	Nominated	
2017	Floorfiller of the Year	"3AM (Pull Up)" (with Charli XCX)	Nominated	

=== Sweden GAFFA Awards ===
Year	Category	Work	Outcome	Ref.
2019	Best Foreign Solo Act	MØ	Nominated	

=== UK Music Video Awards ===
Year	Category	Work	Outcome	Ref.
2016	Best Pop Video — International	"Kamikaze"	Nominated	

=== WDM Radio Awards ===
Year	Category	Work	Outcome	Ref.
2017	Best Global Track	"Cold Water" (shared with Major Lazer and Justin Bieber)	Nominated	
2017	Best Electronic Vocalist	MØ	Nominated	

=== Zulu Awards ===
Year	Category	Work	Outcome	Ref.
2016	Best Female Artist	MØ	Won	
