= Losing My Mind (Falling in Reverse song) =

2018 single by Falling in Reverse

Single by Falling in Reverse
- Released: February 22, 2018
- Genre: Rap rock
- Length: 4:18
- Label: Epitaph
- Songwriters: Ronald Joseph Radke; Cody Stewart; Tyler Smyth
- Producers: Tyler Smyth; Ronnie Radke

Falling in Reverse singles chronology
"Fuck You And All Your Friends" (2017)	"Losing My Mind" (2018)	"Losing My Life" (2018)

Music video
- "Losing My Mind" on YouTube

"Losing My Mind" is a song by American rock band Falling in Reverse. It was released on February 22, 2018. In the US, the song was ranked at number 50 on the Billboard Hot Rock Songs chart. The song has more than 16 million views on Spotify.

== Promotion and release ==
The song was released in February 2018, almost a year after the release of their fourth studio album Coming Home. The band had no intention of recording an album, with vocalist Ronnie Radke later announcing in an interview with Forbes that "Losing My Mind" is the first song in its era to only release singles or perhaps an EP. Although it was not released for any album, the song was included on the Drugs EP, released only on Spotify.

== Composition and lyric ==
The song was written by vocalist Ronnie Radke, Cody Stewart and Tyler Smyth, and composed by Falling in Reverse. The song marks the return of the rap rock sound to the band, whose sound they had left in 2014 due to poor reviews for their second studio album Fashionably Late released in 2013. Radke spoke about the song in a statement:

“I pretty much do whatever I want when it comes to music and nothing is off limits to me, I spent my whole musical career trying to be different and make songs that people think shouldn’t go together… go together. Dying Is Your Latest Fashion was my first record and that’s a prime example — a bunch of different genres on one album. Nothing has changed since then. When people say, ‘You aren’t allowed to play that kind of music, you are this kind of music,’ it makes me want to do it even more.”

In this song Ronnie shows the listener a letter about how he was able to overcome his past problems such as his mother's abandonment, the bullying he suffered and did in his childhood and his drug problems including his problems. Ronnie uses some code words like saying he is a NASDAQ, The lyrics explain how Ronnie can be a rock star and a rapper at the same time and that no critic or his own fans could stop him from making the music he wants.

== Music video ==
The music video was directed by Ethan Lader who had already worked with the band on the videos "Superhero" and "Fuck You And All Your Friends". The music video is the start of a story for future music videos showing vocalist Ronnie Radke fighting with his other self. Some said that the music video has futuristic effects including on the music. The band did not have an official drummer so Michael Levine was involved as a drummer in the video, Levine was playing with the band on tour of Europe.

In May 2023, the music video has 25 million views on YouTube.

== Charts ==
Chart (2018)	Peak position
US Hot Rock & Alternative Songs (Billboard)	50
