= Drum (MØ song) =

Single by MØ
- Released: 7 October 2016
- Genre: Electro-pop
- Length: 3:07
- Label: Sony
- Songwriters: Karen Ørsted; Charlotte Aitchison; Jonnali Parmenius; Michael Tucker
- Producer: BloodPop

MØ singles chronology
| "Cold Water" (2016) | "Drum" (2016) | "Don't Leave" (2017) |

Music video
- "Drum" on YouTube

"Drum" is a song by Danish singer and songwriter MØ. It was released as a single on 7 October 2016. The song was written alongside BloodPop, Charli XCX and Noonie Bao, whilst production was handled by BloodPop. The official audio was released onto YouTube on its release date, which showed a motional, but blurred, MØ along with cameos from Noonie Bao, Charli XCX and BloodPop.

== Background ==
Following a series of high-profile collaborations—including Major Lazer's chart-topping singles "Lean On" and "Cold Water"—MØ returned on October 7 with the release of "Drum". Co-written by MØ, Charli XCX, Noonie Bao, and producer BloodPop, the track addresses the theme of breaking free from unfulfilling relationships in pursuit of personal growth. MØ described the song as being about the difficult but necessary process of letting go, whether it involves a partner, a friend, or even oneself, in order to move forward and discover one's own path.

== Composition ==
According to The Times, "Drum" is a percussion-driven electro-pop track that places MØ alongside fellow Scandinavian artists such as Zara Larsson and Tove Lo, who are known for their consistently catchy hooks. The publication described the chorus—"Dance to the beat of your drum / to the beat of your heart"—as simple but appealing. The Times also noted that the song combines rhythmic production with an accessible melodic structure, capturing MØ's signature blend of pop and electronic elements.

== Music video ==
The music video for the song was released to YouTube on 17 November 2016. The accompanying was also shot and directed by Georgia Hudson, who previously directed the music video for "Don't Wanna Dance", from MØ's debut album No Mythologies to Follow (2014).

== Live performances ==
On 17 November 2016, the song was performed live for BBC Radio 1's Live Lounge.

== Charts ==
Chart performance for "Drum"
| Chart (2016) | Peak position |
|---|---|
| Belgium (Ultratip Bubbling Under Wallonia) | 42 |
| Denmark (Tracklisten) | 21 |
| New Zealand Heatseeker Singles (Recorded Music NZ) | 8 |
| Sweden Heatseeker (Sverigetopplistan) | 2 |
| Scottish Singles Sales (Official Charts) | 75 |
