= Don't Leave (Snakehips and MØ song) =

Single by Snakehips and MØ
- Released: 6 January 2017
- Recorded: 2016
- Genre: EDM-pop
- Length: 3:34
- Label: Sony
- Songwriter(s): Oliver Dickenson; James David; Joe Janiak; Cass Lowe; Negin Djafari; Rachel Keen; Cory Enemy; Karen Marie Ørsted
- Producer(s): Snakehips; Joe Janiak; Cass Lowe; Cory Enemy; Shaun Barrett; Alex Raymond

Snakehips singles chronology
"Burn Break Crash" (2016)	"Don't Leave" (2017)	"How U Feel" (2017)

MØ singles chronology
"Drum" (2016)	"Don't Leave" (2017)	"9 (After Coachella)" (2017)

Music video
- "Don't Leave" on YouTube

"Don't Leave" is a song by British duo Snakehips and Danish singer MØ. It was released on 6 January 2017 through Sony Music. The song was co-written by Joe Janiak, Negin Djafari, Rachel Keen (better known by her stage name Raye), and co-produced by Snakehips, Joe Janiak, and Cass Lowe, who also co-wrote AlunaGeorge's 2016 song "I Remember". "Don't Leave" was accompanied by a lyric video upon its release.

== Music video ==
The official music video for the song was released through Snakehips YouTube account on 19 January 2017, and it was directed by Malia James. The music video features sequences of MØ alongside Italian model Francesco Cuizza.

== Charts ==
=== Weekly charts ===
"Don't Leave" weekly chart performance
Chart (2017)	Peak position
Australia (ARIA)	11
Austria (Ö3 Austria Top 40)	62
Belgium (Ultratip Bubbling Under Flanders)	1
Belgium (Ultratip Bubbling Under Wallonia)	9
Canada (Canadian Hot 100)	52
Czech Republic (Rádio – Top 100)	20
Czech Republic (Singles Digitál Top 100)	60
Denmark (Tracklisten)	11
France (SNEP)	139
Germany (GfK)	84
Ireland (IRMA)	23
Italy (FIMI)	80
Netherlands (Single Top 100)	67
New Zealand (Recorded Music NZ)	16
Norway (VG-lista)	20
Portugal (AFP)	68
Scotland (OCC)	18
Slovakia (Rádio Top 100)	49
Slovakia (Singles Digitál Top 100)	40
Sweden (Sverigetopplistan)	78
Switzerland (Schweizer Hitparade)	78
UK Singles (OCC)	27

=== Year-end charts ===
"Don't Leave" year-end chart performance
Chart (2017)	Position
Australia (ARIA)	57
Denmark (Tracklisten)	69

== Certifications ==
"Don't Leave" certifications
Region	Certification	Certified units/sales
Australia (ARIA)	2× Platinum	140,000^{‡}
Canada (Music Canada)	Platinum	80,000^{‡}
Denmark (IFPI Danmark)	Platinum	90,000^{‡}
New Zealand (RMNZ)	2× Platinum	60,000^{‡}
United Kingdom (BPI)	Gold	400,000^{‡}
United States (RIAA)	Platinum	1,000,000^{‡}
^{‡} Sales+streaming figures based on certification alone.
