= Kamikaze (MØ song) =

Single by MØ

from the album Forever Neverland (Japanese edition)
- Released: 15 October 2015
- Recorded: 2015
- Length: 3:30
- Label: Chess Club; RCA Victor
- Songwriters: Karen Marie Ørsted; Mads Damsgaard Kristiansen; Thomas Wesley Pentz; Philip Meckseper; Boaz de Jong
- Producers: Diplo; Jr Blender; Boaz van de Beatz

MØ singles chronology
"Lost" (2015)	"Kamikaze" (2015)	"Final Song" (2016)

Music video
- "Kamikaze" on YouTube

"Kamikaze" is a song by Danish singer and songwriter MØ, from the Japanese edition of her second studio album Forever Neverland (2018). It was released on 15 October 2015 through Chess Club and RCA Victor as a standalone single. The song was co-produced by Jr Blender and Boaz van de Beatz. It reached the top 40 in Belgium and Denmark.

== Background ==
The antecedent draft of "Kamikaze" was authored by MØ's confidante Mads Kristiansen. MØ says she "fell in love" with the song instantly, and immediately set about making it her own. MØ then hooked up with American producer Diplo in New York City, working on versions of the song. In a press release MØ analyzed working with him.

It's about making memorable songs but, more than that, it's about making pop music that wants to push boundaries.... I've been loving all kinds of pop since I first fell in love with the Spice Girls, but pop needs to bring something new to the table, it needs balls. And that's what you get working with Diplo.

The official audio later premiered on 14 October, on MØ's Vevo channel.

== In popular culture ==
The song was sampled in the feature film Nerve and is included in the film's soundtrack. It also is featured in episode 1x17 of the American television series Quantico and in the movie Snatched.

== Music video ==
The accompanying music video for "Kamikaze" was filmed in Kyiv, Ukraine. It was shot and directed by Truman & Cooper and produced by Amalia Rawlings and Corin Taylor. It premiered on MØ's Vevo channel on 27 October. Billboard magazine likened the video of "drag-racing motor bikes and riding around on what appears to be a chariot made of an old sofa and a tractor" to scenes from Mad Max: Fury Road. The music video was included in Pigeons & Planes' "Best Music Videos of the Month". The music video also gained 1 million views in its initial three days.

== Reception ==
"Kamikaze" was premiered by Annie Mac as "The Hottest Record of the Year". The song also came in at #60 on the annual Triple J Hottest 100 for 2015.

== Charts ==
Chart performance
Chart (2015–2016)	Peak position
Australia (ARIA)	91
Belgium (Ultratop Flanders)	30
Belgium (Ultratip Wallonia)	19
CIS Airplay (TopHit)	161
Denmark (Tracklisten)	16
Sweden Heatseeker (Sverigetopplistan)	12
UK Singles (OCC)	183

== Certifications ==
Certifications
Region	Certification	Certified units/sales
Denmark (IFPI Danmark)	Platinum	60,000^{^}
Mexico (AMPROFON)	Gold	30,000^{‡}
New Zealand (RMNZ)	Gold	15,000^{‡}
Poland (ZPAV)	Gold	10,000^{‡}
^{^} Shipments figures based on certification alone.^{‡} Sales+streaming figures based on certification alone.

== Release history ==
Release dates and formats
Region	Date	Format	Label	Ref.
Worldwide	15 October 2015	Digital download	Chess Club; RCA Victor	
Russia	26 October 2015	Contemporary hit radio	Song	
United States	1 December 2015	Contemporary hit radio	RCA	
