= Way Down (MØ song) =

Single by MØ

from the album Forever Neverland
- Released: 7 September 2018
- Genre: Pop
- Length: 3:08
- Label: Chess Club; RCA Victor
- Songwriters: Karen Marie Ørsted; Ajay Bhattacharya; Cara Salimando; Alexandra Shungudzo Govere; Letter Mbulu; Caiphus Semenya
- Producer: Stint

MØ singles chronology
"Sun in Our Eyes" (2018)	"Way Down" (2018)	"Imaginary Friend" (2018)

Audio video
- "Way Down" on YouTube

"Way Down" is a song by Danish singer and songwriter MØ. It was released on 7 September 2018 as the second single from her second studio album, Forever Neverland (2018).

== Background ==
MØ described the song as "a semi-apocalyptic song about feeling scared and depressed about the ways of world politics these days," expressing how the overwhelming chaos of both real and fake information can lead to a desire for temporary escape. "Sometimes you want to escape it for a moment and go ‘get drunk with your baby’ in the hopes of waking up reset and able," she explained.

The track was produced by Stint, who also served as the executive producer of Forever Neverland (2018), and co-written with Cara Salimando. MØ noted that she had been performing the song live prior to its official release. Alongside the release of "Way Down", she also unveiled the full Forever Neverland tracklist and cover art, revealing upcoming collaborations with Charli XCX and Empress Of.

== Composition ==
NME described "Way Down" as an upbeat pop track that, according to MØ, carries a darker political undertone beneath its infectious melody.
