= Sun in Our Eyes =

Single by MØ and Diplo

from the album Forever Neverland
- Released: 12 July 2018
- Genre: Pop
- Length: 3:38
- Label: Chess Club; RCA Victor
- Songwriters: Karen Marie Ørsted; Thomas Wesley Pentz; Jonathan Hill; Henry Allen; Ilsey Juber
- Producers: Diplo; Jonathan Hill; King Henry

MØ singles chronology
"Nostalgia" (2018)	"Sun in Our Eyes" (2018)	"Way Down" (2018)

Diplo singles chronology
"Welcome to the Party" (2018)	"Sun in Our Eyes" (2018)	"Time Is Up" (2018)

Music video
- "Sun in Our Eyes" on YouTube

"Sun in Our Eyes" is a song by Danish singer and songwriter MØ and American DJ Diplo. It was released on 12 July 2018 as the lead single from her second studio album, Forever Neverland (2018). The song is the seventh collaboration between MØ and Diplo, including the songs such as "Lean On" and "Cold Water".

== Background ==
MØ described the song as a love song that explores the theme of refusing to accept the truth. She explains that it revolves around the feeling of wanting to keep experiencing the thrill of a relationship, despite knowing deep down that it might be wrong and that it’s a self-made illusion.

== Composition ==
Rolling Stone described "Sun in Our Eyes" as a reflection of MØ looking back on past summers and memories of a former lover. The lyrics capture a nostalgic sense of longing, with lines like "I feel the sunlight on my head/ The scent of summer in my bed/ When we were footprints in the sand/ Stealing liquor making plans." These words evoke a sense of youthful freedom and the fleeting nature of summer romances, adding to the song's exploration of love and the passage of time.

== Music video ==
In discussing the music video for "Sun in Our Eyes", MØ explained that it portrays "a gang of people who have chosen to break off from society and create their own world." She described the concept as inspired by Peter Pan and the Lost Boys—"sailing instead of flying"—as they set out for distant shores in pursuit of their dreams. According to MØ, the group collectively represents a rejection of the harsh realities of the world they left behind.

== Critical reception ==
In its review, NME described "Sun in Our Eyes" as "a bright blast of new wave-y pop," noting that MØ evokes a "millennial Gwen Stefani" on the track, particularly in her delivery and stylistic approach.

== Charts ==
Chart performance for "Sun in Our Eyes"
Chart (2018)	Peak position
Belgium (Ultratip Bubbling Under Flanders)	17
Denmark (Tracklisten)	36
New Zealand Hot Singles (RMNZ)	29

== Certifications ==
Certifications for "Sun in Our Eyes"
Region	Certification	Certified units/sales
Australia (ARIA)	Gold	35,000^{‡}
Denmark (IFPI Danmark)	Gold	45,000^{‡}
^{‡} Sales+streaming figures based on certification alone.

== Release history ==
Release dates and formats for "Sun in Our Eyes"
Region	Date	Version	Format	Label	Ref.
Various	12 July 2018	Original	Digital download; streaming	Sony UK	
Various	8 August 2018	Don Diablo remix	Digital download; streaming	Sony UK	
