= Number 1 Angel =

Mixtape by Charli XCX
- Released: 10 March 2017
- Recorded: 2015; October 2016 – early 2017
- Genres: Avant-pop; electropop
- Length: 37:23
- Label: Asylum
- Producers: A. G. Cook; Sophie; Danny L Harle; Life Sim; Easy FX (Note: EasyFX is a duo formerly consisting of producers A. G. Cook and EasyFun.); John Hill

Charli XCX chronology
Vroom Vroom (2016)	Number 1 Angel (2017)	Pop 2 (2017)

Number 1 Angel is the third mixtape by British singer Charli XCX, released on 10 March 2017 by Asylum Records. The mixtape contains ten tracks and was created in Los Angeles, marking their first collaboration with the producer A. G. Cook, the founder of PC Music, in a complete work, considering he had already worked with Charli XCX on a composition and a remix. Several other producers associated with the label also contributed to the mixtape, including Sophie, who previously produced Charli XCX's extended play Vroom Vroom. Musically, it has been labeled as avant-pop and electropop.

Number 1 Angel received generally positive reviews from critics. Some reviewers praised its genre-bending sounds and guest appearances, while others found it repetitive.

== Background ==
In January 2017, Charli XCX stated in an interview with Rolling Stone that she planned to release a mixtape before the release of her third album, saying: "I just got bored and made a load of songs, so I decided to put them out." In an interview with 93.3, she told the radio station that she recorded the mixtape in two weeks. She described the mixtape as a "lot more sad" than her previous work, saying, "this is more like crying into the champagne than drinking it"; she also compared it to her previous work with Sophie. The mixtape was slated for a February 2017 release but was pushed back due to label conflicts. Charli XCX initially recorded the mixtape without her label's permission, stating that the situation, along with the album delay, had her feeling "frustrated and annoyed".

== Critical reception ==
Professional ratings
Aggregate scores
Source	Rating
AnyDecentMusic?	7.2/10
Metacritic	73/100
Review scores
Source	Rating
The 405	8/10
AllMusic	3/5 stars
Crack	7/10
Pitchfork	6.3/10
Pretty Much Amazing	B
Rolling Stone	3.5/5 stars
Tiny Mix Tapes	4/5 marks

At Metacritic, which assigns a normalised rating out of 100 to reviews from mainstream critics, Number 1 Angel received an average score of 73, based on 5 reviews, indicating generally favorable reviews. Frank Falisi from Tiny Mix Tapes compared the mixtape to Madonna's early works and described it as "a text for mitigating engagements." At Pretty Much Amazing, Mick Jacobs stated that "Aitchison intelligently pairs her clever lyrics against beats that push genres outward, her filling in the spaces with her hooks and gigantic personality," whilst Katherine St. Asaph of Pitchfork wrote that the mixtape "is largely stolen by its guests, like Uffie and Cupcakke."

Writing for AllMusic, Neil Z. Young described the release as, "Yet another sonic shift for the singer ... Angel employs tropical bounce, cavernous electronics, and trap-rap influences on ten tracks that are more M.I.A. than Marina and the Diamonds." In a list for Freaky Trigger, Tom Ewing described Number 1 Angel as "Hyperreal pop plus surprisingly good guest spots".

=== Accolades ===
Publication	Accolade	Rank	Ref.
Billboard	25 Best & Worst Album Covers of 2017	Best	
Complex	The Best Albums of 2017	12	
Entertainment Weekly	Best Albums of 2017	18	
Crack Magazine	The Top 100 Albums of 2017	29	
Noisey	The 100 Best Albums of 2017	38	
Gorilla vs. Bear	Gorilla vs. Bear's Albums of 2017	54	
Rolling Stone	20 Best Pop Albums of 2017	8	
Melty	Best Pop Albums of the Year	2	

== Impact ==
Retrospectively, in April 2022, Clash's Ana Lamond stated that the mixtape "holds a resilience in its stride, drawing none of its attention to the cries from Sucker Charli XCX fans, pleading for a return to the more commercial, the more conventional breakthrough days. By no means does the mixtape play things safe, making for a bold attempt in re-defining pop music with its embrace for PC Music."

On 12 April 2025 a new LP edition including a 12" poster and red vinyl was released for RSD after the original version released in 2017 featuring both Number 1 Angel and Pop 2.

== Track listing ==
Number 1 Angel track listing
No.	Title	Writer(s)	Producer(s)	Length
1.	"Dreamer" (featuring Starrah and Raye)	Charlotte Aitchison; Alexander Guy Cook; Brittany Hazzard; Rachel Keen	Cook	3:58
2.	"3AM (Pull Up)" (featuring MØ)	Aitchison; Cook; Finn Keane; Karen Marie Ørsted	Easy FX	3:59
3.	"Blame It on U"	Aitchison; Cook; Noonie Bao	Cook	3:47
4.	"Roll with Me"	Aitchison; Klas Åhlund; Sophie Xeon	Sophie	3:21
5.	"Emotional"	Aitchison; Patrik Berger	Easy FX	3:53
6.	"ILY2"	Aitchison; Danny L Harle	Harle	3:16
7.	"White Roses"	Aitchison; Cook; Bao	Cook	3:33
8.	"Babygirl" (featuring Uffie)	Aitchison; Amanda Warner; John Hill; Sarah Hudson; Anna Hartley	Hill	3:53
9.	"Drugs" (featuring Abra)	Aitchison; Cook; Gabrielle Mirville	Cook	3:49
10.	"Lipgloss" (featuring Cupcakke)	Aitchison; Cook; Elizabeth Harris	Cook; Sophie; Life Sim	3:54
Total length:				37:23

Note

- A later vinyl release included all ten tracks of Number 1 Angel combined with the ten tracks of Pop 2.

== Personnel ==
Credits adapted from Tidal.

Musicians

- Charli XCX – lead vocals
- A. G. Cook – programming (1–3, 5, 7, 9, 10), synthesizer (2, 5), piano (5)
- MØ – vocals (2)
- EasyFun – programming and synthesizer (2, 5), piano (5)
- Sophie – programming (4, 10)
- Danny L Harle – programming (6)
- MNDR – backing vocals (8)
- John Hill – programming (8)
- Jordan Orvash – keyboards (8)
- Life Sim – synthesizer (10)

Technical

- Stuart Hawkes – mastering engineer
- Geoff Swan – mixing
- Cameron Gower Poole – engineer (1, 9)
- Alex Williams – engineer (2, 3, 7)
- Rob Cohen – engineer (8)
- Ryan Gilligan – engineer (8)

== Charts ==
Chart (2017)	Peak position
Australian Albums (ARIA)	74
Canadian Albums (Billboard)	67
New Zealand Heatseekers Albums (RMNZ)	6
US Billboard 200	175

Chart (2025)	Peak position
Croatian International Albums (HDU)	9
Dutch Albums (Album Top 100)	43
Hungarian Albums (MAHASZ)	18
Scottish Albums (Official Charts)	7
UK Albums (Official Charts)	37
US Billboard 200	180

== Tour ==
Number 1 Angel Tour
Date	City	Country	Venue
2 April 2017	San Francisco	United States	Rickshaw
12 April 2017	New York City	United States	Le Poisson Rouge
20 April 2017	London	England	Jazz Café
22 April 2017	Paris	France	Les Étoiles
11 June 2017	São Paulo	Brazil	Memorial da América Latina
