= Final Song =

Single by MØ

from the album Forever Neverland (Japanese edition)
- Released: 13 May 2016
- Genre: Tropical house; dance-pop
- Length: 3:55
- Label: Chess Club; RCA Victor
- Songwriters: Karen Marie Ørsted; Jonnali Parmenius; Uzoechi Emenike
- Producer: MNEK

MØ singles chronology
"Kamikaze" (2015)	"Final Song" (2016)	"Cold Water" (2016)

Music video
- "Final Song" on YouTube

"Final Song" is a song by Danish singer and songwriter MØ, from the Japanese edition of her second studio album Forever Neverland (2018). It was released on 13 May 2016 through Chess Club and RCA Victor as a standalone single. The song was written and composed by MØ and Noonie Bao alongside MNEK, who produced the song. It reached the top 5 in Denmark, the top 20 in Australia, Norway and the United Kingdom, and the top 100 in Canada and Sweden.

== Background and release ==
The song was written by MØ, MNEK and Noonie Bao in Los Angeles in 2016. MØ sent a rough version of the song to MNEK with the changes she wanted to see, asking him to "make it a little lighter". The two later worked on it together, which ended being "dope" according to MNEK. MØ said of the song is "about reconnecting with your inner strength. With your inner glow, passion, spirit animal, whatever – the force that keeps us going and doing what we love. [...] We all need to feel empowered from within to be the best version of ourself, but it’s not always easy and that’s what inspired me to write these lyrics. When you’re united with your inner glow you can beat the fears and fly towards your dreams."

MØ released a snippet of the song on Instagram on 9 May 2016. Like her previous single "Kamikaze", "Final Song" was premiered by Annie Mac on BBC Radio 1 in the United Kingdom.

== Composition ==
"Final Song" is a tropical house and dance-pop song, which contains elements of dancehall. The chorus features a "supremely weird, four-stepping drum machine and a flameout of synthesized xylophonic blips." Lyrically, the song is "about forging on through trying times and the importance of harnessing one's inner power."

The song is written in the key of E major with a common time tempo of 105 beats per minute. MØ's vocals span from B_{3} to E_{5} in the song.

== Reception ==
Rolling Stone called the song an infectious summer anthem. Spin named it "a beautiful new pop confection". Fuse wrote it is "one of the more brilliant song of the summer contenders". Billboard wrote that she "keeps getting better with every release."

UK indie band Bastille covered the song in the Radio 1 Live Lounge in a mash-up with "The Final Countdown" and "7 Days".

== Music video ==
The music video for the song directed by Tomas Whitmore was released to YouTube on 9 June 2016. The video was produced by Hugo Peers and shot in the California Desert National Conservation Area by DOP Niko Wiesnet.

== Live performances ==
On 20 September 2016 MØ performed the single live for The Tonight Show with Jimmy Fallon.

== Charts ==
=== Weekly charts ===
Weekly chart performance for "Final Song"
Chart (2016–2017)	Peak position
Australia (ARIA)	12
Austria (Ö3 Austria Top 40)	11
Belgium (Ultratop 50 Flanders)	37
Belgium (Ultratop 50 Wallonia)	18
Canada Hot 100 (Billboard)	64
Czech Republic Airplay (ČNS IFPI)	59
Czech Republic Singles Digital (ČNS IFPI)	19
Denmark (Tracklisten)	4
Denmark Airplay (Tracklisten)	2
France (SNEP)	102
Germany (GfK)	16
Hungary (Stream Top 40)	29
Ireland (IRMA)	6
Italy (FIMI)	38
Netherlands (Dutch Top 40)	20
Netherlands (Single Top 100)	19
New Zealand (Recorded Music NZ)	20
Norway (VG-lista)	9
Portugal (AFP)	40
Scottish Singles Sales (Official Charts)	8
Slovakia Airplay (ČNS IFPI)	38
Slovakia Singles Digital (ČNS IFPI)	7
Slovenia (SloTop50)	30
Spain (Promusicae)	64
Sweden (Sverigetopplistan)	42
Switzerland (Schweizer Hitparade)	26
UK Singles (Official Charts)	14
UK Dance (Official Charts)	7
US Bubbling Under Hot 100 (Billboard)	15

=== Year-end charts ===
Year-end chart performance for "Final Song"
Chart (2016)	Position
Australia (ARIA)	64
Austria (Ö3 Austria Top 40)	46
Belgium (Ultratop Wallonia)	58
Denmark (Tracklisten)	18
Germany (Official German Charts)	63
Netherlands (Dutch Top 40)	72
Netherlands (Single Top 100)	64
Switzerland (Schweizer Hitparade)	85
UK Singles (OCC)	74

== Certifications ==
Certifications for "Final Song"
Region	Certification	Certified units/sales
Australia (ARIA)	3× Platinum	210,000^{‡}
Austria (IFPI Austria)	Gold	15,000^{‡}
Denmark (IFPI Danmark)	3× Platinum	270,000^{‡}
France (SNEP)	Platinum	133,333^{‡}
Germany (BVMI)	Platinum	400,000^{‡}
Italy (FIMI)	Platinum	50,000^{‡}
Mexico (AMPROFON)	Platinum+Gold	90,000^{‡}
Netherlands (NVPI)	Platinum	40,000^{‡}
New Zealand (RMNZ)	2× Platinum	60,000^{‡}
Poland (ZPAV)	Platinum	20,000^{‡}
Sweden (GLF)	Platinum	40,000^{‡}
United Kingdom (BPI)	Platinum	600,000^{‡}
United States (RIAA)	Platinum	1,000,000^{‡}
^{‡} Sales+streaming figures based on certification alone.

== Release history ==
Release history and formats for "Final Song"
Region	Date	Format	Label	Ref.
Various	13 May 2016	Digital download	Sony	
Italy	26 August 2016	Contemporary hit radio	Sony	
United States	30 August 2016	Contemporary hit radio	Chess Club; RCA	
