= Get It Right (Diplo song) =

Single by Diplo featuring MØ

from the album Major Lazer Presents: Give Me Future and the EP California
- Released: November 15, 2017
- Genre: Future bass; futurepop
- Length: 3:09
- Label: Mad Decent; Kobalt
- Songwriters: Henry Allen; Americo Garcia; Karen Ørsted; Philip Meckseper; Thomas Pentz
- Producer: Diplo • Skrillex (co)

Diplo singles chronology
"Swerve" (2017)	"Get It Right" (2017)	"Look Back" (2018)

MØ singles chronology
"When I Was Young" (2017)	"Get It Right" (2017)	"We Are..." (2018)

Music video
- "Get It Right" on YouTube

"Get It Right" is a song by American DJ and record producer Diplo featuring Danish singer-songwriter MØ. It was released on November 15, 2017, from the album Major Lazer Presents: Give Me Future and Diplo's EP California. The song was written by Diplo, MØ, King Henry, Americo Garcia and Philip Meckseper.

== Content ==
Joie Mitchell of Noiseporn said that the song "[is] the epitome of working hard and partying hard, and neither Diplo nor MØ can be held back from their successful destinies." The song is written in the key of C major, with a tempo of 160 beats per minute.

== Critical reception ==
The website Mix247edm commented that the song "start[s] off with some basic piano cord when MØ's somewhat rugged but beautiful voice chimes in and sets the perfect tone for this uplifting track."

== Music video ==
An accompanying music video was released on January 11, 2018, directed by Brantley Gutierrez and with choreography from Sara Bivens and Calvit Hodge. According to the description by Kat Bein of Billboard, the video features "a wonderfully awkward dance sequence between the two friends alone in a lavish palace room that's empty, save for a grand piano."

== Remix ==
On February 2, 2018, a remix version with American rapper GoldLink was released.

== Charts ==
=== Weekly charts ===
Weekly chart performance for "Get It Right"
Chart (2017–2018)	Peak position
Australia (ARIA)	77
Belgium (Ultratip Bubbling Under Flanders)	21
Belgium (Ultratip Bubbling Under Wallonia)	21
Canada (Canadian Hot 100)	76
France (SNEP)	142
Latvia (DigiTop100)	61
US Hot Dance/Electronic Songs (Billboard)	12

=== Year-end charts ===
Year-end chart performance for "Get It Right"
Chart (2018)	Position
US Hot Dance/Electronic Songs (Billboard)	44

== Certifications ==
Certifications for "Get It Right"
Region	Certification	Certified units/sales
New Zealand (RMNZ)	Platinum	30,000^{‡}
^{‡} Sales+streaming figures based on certification alone.

== Release history ==
Release history and versions for "Get It Right"
Region	Date	Format	Version	Label	Ref.
Various	November 15, 2017	Digital download; streaming	Original	Mad Decent; Kobalt	
Various	February 2, 2018	Digital download; streaming	GoldLink remix	Mad Decent; Kobalt	
