= Cold Water (song) =

2016 single by Major Lazer featuring Justin Bieber and MØ

Single by Major Lazer featuring Justin Bieber and MØ

from the album Major Lazer Essentials
- Released: July 22, 2016
- Recorded: 2015
- Genre: Eurodance
- Length: 3:05
- Label: Mad Decent; Def Jam
- Songwriters: Thomas Pentz; Justin Bieber; MØ; Benjamin Levin; Henry Allen; Philip Meckseper; Ed Sheeran; Jamie Scott
- Producers: Major Lazer; Benny Blanco; King Henry; Jr Blender

Major Lazer singles chronology
"Boom" (2016)	"Cold Water" (2016)	"Believer" (2016)

Justin Bieber singles chronology
"Company" (2016)	"Cold Water" (2016)	"Let Me Love You" (2016)

MØ singles chronology
"Final Song" (2016)	"Cold Water" (2016)	"Drum" (2016)

Music video
- "Cold Water" (Dance video) on YouTube

"Cold Water" is a song by American electronic dance music production group Major Lazer, featuring vocals from Canadian singer Justin Bieber and Danish singer MØ. The song was released on July 22, 2016, as the lead single from their debut greatest hits album, Major Lazer Essentials. It became Major Lazer's third collaboration with MØ after "Lean On" and "Lost".

"Cold Water" peaked at number one on the UK Singles Chart and number two on the US Billboard Hot 100. The song also reached number one in Australia, Austria, Belgium (Wallonia), Brazil, Canada, Finland, Ireland, Italy, the Netherlands, New Zealand, Norway, Portugal, Sweden and Switzerland; as well as the top 10 in Belgium (Flanders), Denmark, France, Germany, Greece, Iceland, Israel, Lebanon, Luxembourg, Mexico, Scotland, South Africa and Spain.

== Background and release ==
"Cold Water" was a weird one because I didn’t even know that song existed. It was a song I must have half-written somewhere at a time where I was writing a lot of songs and I did it at Benny Blanco’s house and then I got an email from Diplo just being like, "Yo! That 'Cold Water' song is dope! Can I have it?" And I was like, "I have no idea what you’re talking about," so I just didn’t reply. And then he emailed and was like, "Yo, Justin [Bieber] wants to hop on the 'Cold Water' song. Is that cool?" And I’m just like, "What are you talking about?"... And then the song came out and it was number one and I was like "Oh, that song!" I remember doing it, but it was really, really slow. I remember hearing it and being like "That kind of sounds like me. Oh wait, it was me."

— Ed Sheeran

The day before Diplo arrived in New York City in May 2016, he was "more than a little surprised" when Justin Bieber sent a message on Twitter about the track, "Cold Water", asking when it would be coming out. "That was not planned at all," Diplo said. According to Diplo, the song wasn't really done, when Bieber already expressed his excitement. "It's actually very real. Twitter is the only reason I know he's excited about the song. I don't have his number, so he Twitters at me," Diplo added. On May 30, Diplo announced Major Lazer's collaboration with Bieber and MØ. At the time, he did not give a specific release date, only mentioning it would be released "in a couple of weeks" and that it would premiere through Beats 1.

You can tell if something’s authentic or not… I felt like [MØ] was so ambiguous, having grown up singing pop and punk… Her word choice and her metaphors are just so foreign from American songwriters who tend to overuse the same phrases.

— Diplo's reply to a question, which said: "Why did Major Lazer ask MØ to be on the song?"

The song initially started a project, which eventually built to Major Lazer's fourth studio album's January 2017 release. "It's complicated because we just want to do it indie," described Diplo of "Cold Water." "And convincing Bieber's marketing crew to do that is hard. We don't need to have some guy tell us, 'Oh, this is what the market research says.' I'm on the ground. I see it."

I had been trying to link with Benny Blanco and Ed Sheeran for years to find the right song we could all work on together and the moment I heard this one, I knew that it was the one. The timing was perfect and when we approached Justin, he was also in love with the song we all had written. I thought it would be interesting to incorporate another vocal and seeing she's family, I reached out to MØ and we decided to try our best to make something fresh and interesting as Major Lazer.

— Diplo on recording "Cold Water".

On July 1, 2016, Bieber began releasing teasers of the song, and added the song would come out later that month. On July 13, he wrote the release date was set for July 22. A low-quality version of the track leaked on Chinese radio station in July 2016, four days prior to its official release. After the latter incident, "Cold Water" was officially released on July 22, 2016. Moreover, it was sent to US Top 40 radio on July 26, 2016.

== Remix ==
The official remix of "Cold Water" features a newly additional verse and replaces Bieber's second verse and the first half of Bieber's second pre-chorus by rapper Gucci Mane. It was first mentioned by both Bieber and Mane through social media. Diplo premiered the remix during Brunch Bounce at Elvis Guesthouse in New York City on July 22, 2016, the same day the original version was released. It was later released online on August 12, 2016. Mane's verse replaces Bieber's second verse and the first half of Bieber's second pre-chorus, while the rest of the song remains the same as the original version.

== Composition ==
"Cold Water", a mid-tempo song, includes dancehall and Euro club music influences, while featuring "vibrant electronic chords and coastal beats [with] a hook-heavy pop influence" and acoustic guitars. Jacob Stolworthy of The Independent noted similarities between the song and Bieber's "Love Yourself", which was also written by Bieber, Blanco and Sheeran.

== Critical reception ==
"Cold Water" received positive reviews from music critics. Newsweek's Tufayel Ahmed and Digital Spy's Megan Davies called it a future summer hit. Raisa Bruner of Time shared the same opinion, explaining: "This is the kind of jam you want to play as you road trip with the windows down; the kind of catchy slow-burn that gives you feels but will also get you going at a dance party." Jezebel deemed it "perfect for a lazy summer day with your friends". Anna Gaca of Spin described it as a "copacetic electronic ballad".

The New York Times's Jon Caramanica was less enthusiastic towards the song, writing: "Bieber's earlier collaborations with Diplo (and also Skrillex) worked because of the frisson of the young pop star getting tugged onto the producers’ turf. But with 'Cold Water', Mr. Bieber's new collaboration with Diplo's Major Lazer project — which also includes an appearance by the singer MØ — the gravity pulls in the other direction." Calling the song "tepid", he concluded: "The return, near the song's end, of the flute-that's-not-actually-a-flute that was such a radical injection the last time around, here feels like an act of desperation."

Billboard ranked "Cold Water" at number 56 on their "Billboard's 100 Best Pop Songs of 2016" list.

== Commercial performance ==
In the United States, "Cold Water" debuted at number two, behind Sia's "Cheap Thrills", on the Billboard Hot 100 on the chart dating August 13, 2016, becoming Bieber's third number-two debut on the chart, passing Mariah Carey's record to become the artist with the most number-two debuts; he also leads with the most top-two debuts at five. Additionally, "Cold Water" becomes the second top 10 single and highest-charting single for both Major Lazer and MØ in the United States, as well as Bieber's eleventh top 10 single. The song went up and down in the top 5 back to number two, while The Chainsmokers' "Closer" featuring Halsey dethroned Sia's "Cheap Thrills". The single opened at number one on Digital Songs with 169,000 downloads, becoming Major Lazer and MØ's first, and Bieber's fifth, leader on the chart and their biggest sales week to date. It also debuted atop the Streaming Songs and On-Demand Songs charts.

In the United Kingdom, "Cold Water" debuted at number one on the UK Singles Chart, on the issue dated July 29, 2016, with 102,000 combined sales, which included 5.56 million streams and 47,000 downloads. By debuting at number one, it ended a fifteen-week run at the top of the chart by Drake's "One Dance" and was the second song to debut at number one in 2016, after "Pillowtalk" by Zayn Malik in February. Additionally, the song became Major Lazer and MØ's first number-one single and Bieber's fourth. It also marks the first time two Danish acts have reached number one in the same year (with the other being Lukas Graham's "7 Years"). On the ARIA Singles Chart, "Cold Water" also debuted at number one, giving Major Lazer their second number-one single in Australia.

== Track listing ==
Digital download
No.	Title	Length
1.	"Cold Water" (featuring Justin Bieber and MØ)	3:05

Digital download – Remixes
No.	Title	Length
1.	"Cold Water" (Lost Frequencies Remix)	3:56
2.	"Cold Water" (Ocular Remix)	4:31
3.	"Cold Water" (Delirious & Alex K Remix)	3:19
4.	"Cold Water" (Boombox Cartel Remix)	3:47
5.	"Cold Water" (Afrojack Remix)	3:10
6.	"Cold Water" (King Henry & Jr. Blender Remix)	3:20
7.	"Cold Water" (Anirudh Remix) (Diwali Edition)	3:42
8.	"Cold Water" (Don Omar Remix) (featuring Justin Bieber, MØ, & Don Omar)	3:02
9.	"Cold Water" (Official Remix) (featuring Justin Bieber, MØ, & Gucci Mane)	3:05
Total length:		28:47

CD Single
No.	Title	Length
1.	"Cold Water" (featuring Justin Bieber & MØ)	3:05
2.	"Cold Water" (Instrumental) (featuring Justin Bieber & MØ)	3:05
Total length:		6:10

== Charts ==
=== Weekly charts ===
Chart (2016–2017)	Peak position
Argentina (Monitor Latino)	11
Argentina Digital Songs (CAPIF)	2
Australia (ARIA)	1
Austria (Ö3 Austria Top 40)	1
Belgium (Ultratop 50 Flanders)	4
Belgium (Ultratop 50 Wallonia)	1
Brazil (Brasil Hot 100)	1
Canada Hot 100 (Billboard)	1
Canada AC (Billboard)	8
Canada CHR/Top 40 (Billboard)	1
Canada Hot AC (Billboard)	6
CIS Airplay (TopHit)	111
Colombia (National-Report)	33
Czech Republic Airplay (ČNS IFPI)	11
Czech Republic Singles Digital (ČNS IFPI)	1
Denmark (Tracklisten)	2
Euro Digital Song Sales (Billboard)	1
Finland (Suomen virallinen lista)	1
France (SNEP)	2
Germany (GfK)	2
Greece Digital Songs (Billboard)	2
Hungary (Dance Top 40)	13
Hungary (Rádiós Top 40)	2
Hungary (Single Top 40)	4
Iceland (RÚV)	7
Ireland (IRMA)	1
Israel International Airplay (Media Forest)	2
Italy (FIMI)	1
Japan Hot 100 (Billboard)	32
Lebanon (Lebanese Top 20)	7
Luxembourg Digital Songs (Billboard)	4
Mexico (Billboard Mexican Airplay)	2
Netherlands (Dutch Top 40)	1
Netherlands (Single Top 100)	1
New Zealand (Recorded Music NZ)	1
Norway (VG-lista)	1
Poland Airplay (ZPAV)	15
Portugal (AFP)	1
Scottish Singles Sales (Official Charts)	2
Slovakia Airplay (ČNS IFPI)	16
Slovakia Singles Digital (ČNS IFPI)	1
Slovenia (SloTop50)	12
South Africa Airplay (EMA)	6
South Korea International (Gaon)	13
Spain (Promusicae)	2
Sweden (Sverigetopplistan)	1
Switzerland (Schweizer Hitparade)	1
UK Singles (Official Charts)	1
UK Dance (Official Charts)	1
UK Indie (Official Charts)	1
US Billboard Hot 100	2
US Adult Contemporary (Billboard)	20
US Adult Pop Airplay (Billboard)	7
US Dance Club Songs (Billboard)	1
US Hot Dance/Electronic Songs (Billboard)	1
US Pop Airplay (Billboard)	1
US Rhythmic Airplay (Billboard)	3
Venezuela English (Record Report)	1

=== Year-end charts ===
Chart (2016)	Position
Argentina (Monitor Latino)	20
Australia (ARIA)	11
Austria (Ö3 Austria Top 40)	17
Belgium (Ultratop Flanders)	27
Belgium (Ultratop Wallonia)	31
Brazil (Brasil Hot 100)	24
Canada (Canadian Hot 100)	18
Denmark (Tracklisten)	9
France (SNEP)	43
Germany (Official German Charts)	15
Hungary (Dance Top 40)	44
Hungary (Rádiós Top 40)	53
Hungary (Single Top 40)	36
Hungary (Stream Top 40)	94
Iceland (Plötutíóindi)	10
Italy (FIMI)	25
Netherlands (Dutch Top 40)	7
Netherlands (Single Top 100)	11
New Zealand (Recorded Music NZ)	13
Spain (PROMUSICAE)	35
Sweden (Sverigetopplistan)	12
Switzerland (Schweizer Hitparade)	29
UK Singles (Official Charts Company)	14
US Billboard Hot 100	25
US Adult Top 40 (Billboard)	35
US Dance Club Songs (Billboard)	14
US Hot Dance/Electronic Songs (Billboard)	4
US Mainstream Top 40 (Billboard)	19
US Rhythmic (Billboard)	38
Chart (2017)	Position
Brazil (Pro-Música Brasil)	89
Canada (Canadian Hot 100)	76
Denmark (Tracklisten)	84
France (SNEP)	196
Hungary (Dance Top 40)	71
Hungary (Rádiós Top 40)	70
US Hot Dance/Electronic Songs (Billboard)	14
Chart (2018)	Position
Hungary (Rádiós Top 40)	95

=== Decade-end charts ===
Chart (2010–2019)	Position
UK Singles (Official Charts Company)	91
US Hot Dance/Electronic Songs (Billboard)	27

== Certifications ==
Region	Certification	Certified units/sales
Australia (ARIA)	7× Platinum	490,000^{‡}
Austria (IFPI Austria)	Platinum	30,000^{‡}
Belgium (BRMA)	2× Platinum	40,000^{‡}
Brazil (Pro-Música Brasil)	3× Platinum	180,000^{‡}
Canada (Music Canada)	3× Platinum	240,000^{‡}
Denmark (IFPI Danmark)	4× Platinum	360,000^{‡}
France (SNEP)	Diamond	233,333^{‡}
Germany (BVMI)	Platinum	400,000^{‡}
Italy (FIMI)	5× Platinum	250,000^{‡}
New Zealand (RMNZ)	6× Platinum	180,000^{‡}
Norway (IFPI Norway)	4× Platinum	240,000^{‡}
Poland (ZPAV)	Gold	25,000^{‡}
Portugal (AFP)	Platinum	10,000^{‡}
Spain (Promusicae)	2× Platinum	80,000^{‡}
Switzerland (IFPI Switzerland)	Platinum	30,000^{‡}
United Kingdom (BPI)	3× Platinum	1,800,000^{‡}
United States (RIAA)	4× Platinum	4,000,000^{‡}
^{‡} Sales+streaming figures based on certification alone.

== Release history ==
Country	Date	Format	Label	Ref.
United States	July 22, 2016	Digital download	Mad Decent; Def Jam	
Italy	July 22, 2016	Contemporary hit radio	Warner	
United States	July 26, 2016	Top 40 radio	Mad Decent; Def Jam	
