= Northtown =

Northtown or North Town may refer to:

- Northtown (EP), 2014 EP by Shamir
- A neighbourhood in North Las Vegas, Nevada known as North Town
- North Las Vegas Airport, known as Northtown
- North Town, Pleasureville, Kentucky
- North Town (North Wootton hamlet), a hamlet in North Wootton, Somerset, UK
- North Town (North Cadbury hamlet), a hamlet in North Cadbury, Somerset, UK

== See also ==
- Northtown Mall (disambiguation)
