= Keep Moving (MØ song) =

2025 single by MØ

Single by MØ

from the album Plæygirl
- Released: 21 March 2025
- Length: 3:22
- Label: Sony UK
- Songwriters: Karen Marie Ørsted; Nick Sylvester; Elliott Kozel; Rasmus Littaeur
- Producers: Nick Sylvester; Elliott Kozel

MØ singles chronology
"Sweet" (2025)	"Keep Moving" (2025)	"Lose Yourself" (2025)

Music video
- "Keep Moving" on YouTube

"Keep Moving" (stylized as "Keep Møving") is a song by the Danish singer-songwriter MØ. It was released on 28 January 2025, through Sony Music UK, as the third single from her fourth studio album, Plæygirl. The song was produced by Nick Sylvester and Elliott Kozel, and additional producers, Matthew Neighbour and Hamish Patrick.

== Background ==
Following previous single "Sweet" featuring Biig Piig, this track sees MØ lean further into club-inspired sonics, teaming up with producers Nick Sylvester, Elliott Kozel, and The Dare. Described by MØ as "an ironic take on my endless to-do list", the song addresses the pressures of expectations in a fast-paced world, with the artist calling the explosive chorus ad-libs her "favourite ever".

== Personnel ==
Credits adapted from Apple Music.

- Karen Marie Ørsted — vocals, songwriter, recording engineer
- Nick Sylvester — producer, songwriter, synthesizer, background vocals, programming, recording engineer
- Elliott Kozel — producer, songwriter, guitar, recording engineer
- Harrison Patrick Smith — additional producer, synthesizer
- Rasmus Littaeur — songwriter
- Matthew Neighbour — additional producer
- Robert Szmurlo — recording engineer
- Christian Refer — recording engineer
- Mads Mølgaard Helbæk— recording engineer
- Lars Stalfors — mixing engineer
- Ruairí O'Flaherty — mastering engineer

== Track listing ==
- Digital download and streaming
1. "Keep Moving" – 3:22
- Digital download and streaming – Remix
1. "Keep Moving" (Jenny Wilson Remix) – 4:14
2. "Keep Moving" – 3:22
- Digital download and streaming – Spotify
1. "Keep Moving" – 3:22
2. "Sweet" (featuring Biig Piig) – 2:56
3. "Wake Me Up" – 4:15
4. "Who Said" – 3:07

== Charts ==
Chart performance for "Keep Moving"
Chart (2025)	Peak position
Czech Republic Airplay (ČNS IFPI)	43

== Release history ==
Release dates, formats and versions of "Keep Moving"
Region	Date	Format	Version	Label	Ref.
Worldwide	21 March 2025	Digital download	Original	Sony UK	
Worldwide	18 April 2025	Digital download	Jenny Wilson Remix	Sony UK	
