= Lose Yourself (MØ song) =

2025 single by MØ

Single by MØ

from the album Plæygirl
- Released: 2 May 2025
- Genre: Electro-disco; Scandi-pop
- Length: 2:54
- Label: Sony UK
- Songwriters: Karen Marie Ørsted; Nick Sylvester; Ronni Vindahl; Clementine Douglas; Micah Jasper; Stint; Rasmus Littaeur
- Producers: Nick Sylvester; Ronni Vindahl

MØ singles chronology
"Keep Moving" (2025)	"Lose Yourself" (2025)	"Heartbreak" (2025)

Music video
- "Lose Yourself" on YouTube

"Lose Yourself" is a song by the Danish singer-songwriter MØ. It was released on 2 May 2025, through Sony Music UK, as the fourth single from her fourth studio album, Plæygirl.

== Background ==
"Lose Yourself" was produced by Nick Sylvester, with additional contributions from School of X and Clementine Douglas. It was originally written in 2022 with Stint and later reworked with School of X. The final version was completed with input from Ronni Vindahl and Micah Jasper. The album Plæygirl was developed between 2022 and 2024 in Copenhagen and Los Angeles and follows MØ's 2022 album Motordrome.

== Composition ==
"Lose Yourself" combines elements of electro-disco and scandi-pop. The production was influenced in part by the sound of Joy Division and reflects a balance between energetic rhythms and melodic textures. Lyrically, the song explores themes of self-preservation, self-joy, and emotional connection. According to MØ, it is "about letting go in a healthy way, without losing each other in the process," and serves as a reminder to be vulnerable, care for oneself, and maintain strong ties with loved ones and the broader community.
