= If It Wasn't True =

Single by Shamir

from the album Northtown
- Released: June 6, 2014
- Genre: Disco; acid house
- Length: 3:58
- Label: Godmode
- Songwriter: Shamir Bailey
- Producer: Nick Sylvester

Shamir singles chronology
"If It Wasn't True" (2014)	"On the Regular" (2014)

"If It Wasn't True" is a song written and recorded by American singer-songwriter Shamir Bailey, better known by his stage name Shamir, and included as the opening track on his debut extended play (EP) Northtown. Musically, "If It Wasn't True" is an R&B, pop, and dance song. Shamir has called the track "a breakup song, but not a typical one," and Vogue magazine in 2014 dubbed it "Your New Favorite Breakup Song."

== Composition and style ==
Shamir has described "If It Wasn't True" as a "typical breakup song". The song was the first released by Shamir and introduced his countertenor voice to the music world. Shamir has said that he doesn't mind having his voice described as androgynous, but notes that "countertenor" is the correct term: "It's not feminine, it's not masculine. It's a happy medium ... I feel like if the world was more like that, our problems would be gone."

Jazz Monroe of Dazed magazine described "If It Wasn't True" as "semidissonant pulses tickled by antsy snares and hi-hats – as Shamir's sinuous vocal vogues down memory lane." Lizzie Plaugic of CMJ called Shamir's music "amazingly unclassifiable," like a "souped-up Vegas Strip disco with a self-conscious pop bent," and wrote that Shamir's voice "limbers and stretches like a wad of pink Silly Putty dipped in glitter."

== Release ==
"If It Wasn't True" was first released in early 2014 as part of a cassette compilation called "Common Interests Were Not Enough To Keep Us Together" from Godmode Music. The song proved to be a "highlight of the compilation," and the track was released digitally in late February 2014. An official music video was released in March 2014, and in June 2014, Shamir's debut extended play (EP) Northtown was released with "If It Wasn't True" as the opening track.

== Music video ==
The official music video for "If It Wasn't True" features distorted images of Shamir's hometown, Las Vegas, Nevada, interspersed with video footage of Shamir in a bathtub, playing with bubbles, and dancing and hanging with friends. The video was shot by Shamir with editor Anthony Sylvester adding fisheye and chop-up effects and "all sorts of weird filters."

Jazz Monroe of Dazed magazine wrote of the video: "It's a freeform assortment of twerking headstands, foam-beard fun and Las Vegas neon, all intercut with fabulous house party hijinks that echo '80s Manhattan loft culture."

Shamir's Twitter handle described himself as a "musician, comedian, singer, rapper, twerker, chef, writer, filmmaker, tumblr, skinny fat ass."

== Critical reception ==
In a review for Pitchfork, Mike Powell rated "If It Wasn't True" as a "Best New Track" and wrote: "Rarely do debuts sound so certain." Powell described Shamir's voice on the track as "thin, pretty and androgynous, like "an alien presence in a track that at every step is earthy and rock-solid." He also referred to the song as "[s]exy, dissonant, confident but a little amateurish" following a tradition of "high-rent body music made by people who probably take the bus to work."

In Vogue magazine, Thomas Gebremedhin reviewed the song, noting that "Bailey's delicate vocals glide effortlessly over the funky production that recalls '80s classics from Janet Jackson and Prince."

Tom Breihan of Stereogum called it "a truly great song" and a "disco-house anthem" sung with "rare levels of badass self-assurance."

"Recommended Listen" called Northtown "a watershed moment for both the artist and the label" and described "If It Wasn't True" as "one of the year's best dance singles."

In July 2014, Flavorwire named "If It Wasn't True" one of its "25 Best Songs of 2014 So Far".
