= Nick Sylvester =

American musician (born 1982)

- Sylvester in 2026
- Born: Nick Sylvester; Montgomeryville, Pennsylvania, U.S.
- Education: Harvard University (AB)
- Occupations: Record producer; songwriter; music executive
- Years active: 2008–present
- Spouse: Mina Kimes (m. 2015)
- Children: 1
- Musical career
- Genres: Electronic; dance; pop
- Instruments: Synthesizers; drums; vocals
- Formerly of: Mr. Dream

Nick Sylvester is an American record producer, songwriter, multi-instrumentalist, and music executive. He is best known for his writing and production work with Channel Tres and Yaeji, and as the creative co-founder of Godmode Music.

== Early life and education ==
Sylvester was born and raised in Montgomeryville, Pennsylvania, outside of Philadelphia. He attended St. Joseph's Prep, where he played trumpet professionally in wedding and jazz bands. After graduating from high school, Sylvester attended Harvard University, where he wrote for The Harvard Lampoon. Sylvester graduated from Harvard with a degree in classics in 2004.

== Career ==
=== Journalism, writing ===
Sylvester wrote about pop, rap, dance, indie and experimental music for the music publication Pitchfork from 2002 to 2006 and served as an editor from 2004 to 2006.

In 2006, while he was a writer and senior associate editor at The Village Voice, he was suspended for his essay "Do You Wanna Kiss Me?", a piece about Neil Strauss's The Game, after the essay was revealed to contain fabrications about a secret society of pickup artists. Later that year, he was hired as a writer by The Colbert Report, and continued to write articles for n+1, The Wire, and New York Magazine.

=== Songwriting, record production ===
From 2008 to 2012, Sylvester produced, co-wrote, and played drums in the Brooklyn punk rock music group Mr. Dream. In 2009, Sylvester lived with James Murphy in Los Angeles during the recording of the music that would become LCD Soundsystem's This Is Happening. His time in Los Angeles with Murphy was when Sylvester extensively learned how to record, mix, and produce. Sylvester also wrote an essay for the release of Shut Up and Play the Hits, and he also performed in the men's chorus for the then-final LCD Soundsystem shows in 2011.

In 2014, he produced La Isla Bonita by Deerhoof, as well as the Northtown and Ratchet by Shamir. In 2016, Sylvester moved to Los Angeles to further pursue his career as a songwriter and record producer. He has co-written, produced, recorded, mixed, and remixed for a variety of artists, including Channel Tres, Yaeji, Shopping, Honey Dijon, Denzel Curry, Tyler, The Creator, JPEGMafia, and The Dare.

In 2017, he co-founded Godmode Music, an artist development company that blended traditional record label and management, based originally on his vanity label for Mr. Dream. Sylvester co-wrote and produced the recordings of the artists signed to the company. At Godmode, he also co-developed the music workflow app Bounce. He exited the company in 2022 and started a new label, called smartdumb, in 2023.

In 2022, it was announced that Sylvester had scored the 30 for 30 documentary “American Son” about tennis player Michael Chang, directed by Jay Caspian Kang.

In 2025, Sylvester produced the album Plæygirl by the Danish singer and songwriter MØ.

== Personal life ==
Sylvester married ESPN analyst Mina Kimes in 2015, and lives in Los Angeles with their dog Lenny. Their first child, a boy, was born in fall 2023.

== Discography ==
=== Songwriter and record producer ===
Year	Artist	Song	Album
2014	Deerhoof	"Paradise Girls"	La Isla Bonita
2014	Deerhoof	"Mirror Monster"	La Isla Bonita
2014	Deerhoof	"Doom"	La Isla Bonita
2014	Deerhoof	"Last Fad"	La Isla Bonita
2014	Deerhoof	"Tiny Bubbles"	La Isla Bonita
2014	Deerhoof	"Exit Only"	La Isla Bonita
2014	Deerhoof	"Big House Waltz"	La Isla Bonita
2014	Deerhoof	"God 2"	La Isla Bonita
2014	Deerhoof	"Black Pitch"	La Isla Bonita
2014	Deerhoof	"Oh Bummer"	La Isla Bonita
2014	Shamir	"If It Wasn't True"	Northtown
2014	Shamir	"I Know It's A Good Thing"	Northtown
2014	Shamir	"Sometimes A Man"	Northtown
2014	Shamir	"I'll Never Be Able To Love"	Northtown
2014	Shamir	"Lived and Died Alone"	Northtown
2015	Shamir	"Vegas"	Ratchet
2015	Shamir	"Make A Scene"	Ratchet
2015	Shamir	"On the Regular"	Ratchet
2015	Shamir	"Call It Off"	Ratchet
2015	Shamir	"Hot Mess"	Ratchet
2015	Shamir	"Demon"	Ratchet
2015	Shamir	"In For The Kill"	Ratchet
2015	Shamir	"Youth"	Ratchet
2015	Shamir	"Darker"	Ratchet
2015	Shamir	"Head in the Clouds"	Ratchet
2015	Shamir	"KC"	Ratchet
2015	Sky Ferreira	"I Blame Myself" (Negative Supply Remix)	non-album remix
2016	Yaeji	"New York 93"	Yaeji
2016	Yaeji	"Guap"	Yaeji
2016	Yaeji	"Noonside"	Yaeji
2016	Yaeji	"Feel It Out"	Yaeji
2016	Yaeji	"Full Of It"	Yaeji
2016	Mai Lan	"Technique"	Vampire EP
2016	Mai Lan	"Haze"	Vampire EP
2017	Yaeji	"Feelings Change"	EP2
2017	Yaeji	"Raingurl"	EP2
2017	Yaeji	"Drink I'm Sippin' On"	EP2
2017	Yaeji	"After That"	EP2
2017	Yaeji	"Passionfruit"	EP2
2017	Yaeji	"Therapy"	Therapy
2017	Yaeji	"Last Breath"	Last Breath
2017	Mai Lan	"Vampire"	Autopilote
2018	Channel Tres	"St. Julian (Intro)"	Channel Tres EP
2018	Channel Tres	"Controller"	Channel Tres EP
2018	Channel Tres	"Jet Black"	Channel Tres EP
2018	Channel Tres	"Topdown"	Channel Tres EP
2018	Mai Lan	"Peru"	Autopilote
2018	Mai Lan	"Pumper"	Autopilote
2018	Mai Lan	"Nail Polish"	Autopilote
2018	Mai Lan	"Missile"	Autopilote
2018	Mai Lan	"Dial My Number"	Autopilote
2018	Mai Lan	"Blaze Up"	Autopilote
2018	Mai Lan	"Clermont"	Autopilote
2018	Mai Lan	"Time To Fade"	Autopilote
2018	Mai Lan	"Technique"	Autopilote
2018	Mai Lan	"Pas d'amour"	Autopilote
2019	Channel Tres	"Orpheus"	Black Moses
2019	Channel Tres	"Brilliant Nigga"	Black Moses
2019	Channel Tres	"Black Moses" (ft. JPEGMafia)	Black Moses
2019	Channel Tres	"Sexy Black Timberlake"	Black Moses
2019	Channel Tres	"Raw Power"	Black Moses
2020	Isola	"Ischia"	EP1
2020	Isola	"Any Day"	EP1
2020	Isola	"Canis Major"	EP1
2020	Isola	"Said It Again"	EP1
2020	Isola	"Two Birds"	EP1
2020	Isola	"La Notte"	EP1
2020	Isola	"Ricorda - Tell Me"	EP1
2020	Channel Tres	"i can't go outside - intro"	I Can't Go Outside
2020	Channel Tres	"2000 chevy malibu"	I Can't Go Outside
2020	Channel Tres	"skate depot"	I Can't Go Outside
2020	Channel Tres	"broke down kid interlude"	I Can't Go Outside
2020	Channel Tres	"fuego" (feat. Tyler, the Creator)	I Can't Go Outside
2020	LoveLeo	"BOYFREN"	LOOK AT THIS MESS IVE MADE
2020	LoveLeo	"RECENTLY DELETED"	LOOK AT THIS MESS IVE MADE
2020	LoveLeo	"AHHHHHHH"	LOOK AT THIS MESS IVE MADE
2020	LoveLeo	"HEAD OVER HEELS"	LOOK AT THIS MESS IVE MADE
2020	LoveLeo	"ROSIE"	LOOK AT THIS MESS IVE MADE
2020	LoveLeo	"LEMONS"	LOOK AT THIS MESS IVE MADE
2020	LoveLeo	"BABYFREEZE"	LOOK AT THIS MESS IVE MADE
2020	LoveLeo	"ROCKBOTTOM"	LOOK AT THIS MESS IVE MADE
2021	LoveLeo	"BUZZCUT"	non-album single
2021	LoveLeo	"TUNG TIED"	non-album single
2021	PawPaw Rod	"HIT EM WHERE IT HURTS"	A PawPaw Rod EP
2021	PawPaw Rod	"Glass House"	A PawPaw Rod EP
2021	PawPaw Rod	"Thin Lines"	A PawPaw Rod EP
2021	PawPaw Rod	"Lemonhaze"	A PawPaw Rod EP
2022	Channel Tres	"Acid In My Blood"	Acid / Ganzfeld
2022	Channel Tres	"Ganzfeld Experiment"	Acid / Ganzfeld
2022	Channel Tres	"No Limit"	non-album single
2022	Honey Dijon	"Show Me Some Love"	Black Girl Magic
2022	PawPaw Rod	"Message (Better Days)"	Another PawPaw Rod EP
2022	PawPaw Rod	"Beautiful"	Another PawPaw Rod EP
2022	PawPaw Rod	"Lovetap"	Another PawPaw Rod EP
2022	PawPaw Rod	"Shining Star"	Another PawPaw Rod EP
2023	Uffie	"Oopsie"	Oopsie/Alchemy
2023	Uffie	"Alchemy"	Oopsie/Alchemy
2023	Isola	"Last Winter"	LP1
2023	Isola	"Too Soon"	LP1
2023	Isola	"Red Balloon"	LP1
2023	Isola	"Aquarius"	LP1
2023	Isola	"Heaven"	LP1
2023	Isola	"In the Dead of Night"	LP1
2023	Isola	"For Thee I Sing"	LP1
2023	Isola	"Prayer"	LP1
2023	Isola	"Sundowner"	LP1
2023	The Dare	"Sex"	Sex EP
2023	Avalon Emerson	"Karaoke Song"	& the Charm
2023	Channel Tres	"Sleep When I'm Dead"	Real Cultural Shit
2023	Channel Tres	"6am"	Real Cultural Shit
2023	Channel Tres	"Just Can't Get Enough"	Real Cultural Shit
2023	Channel Tres	"Big Time"	Real Cultural Shit
2023	Channel Tres	"All My Friends"	Real Cultural Shit
2023	Allie Teilz	"Type of Girl"	non-album single
2025	MØ	"Meat on a Stick"	Plæygirl
2025	MØ	"Who Said"	Plæygirl
2025	MØ	"Knife"	Plæygirl
2025	MØ	"Without You"	Plæygirl
2025	MØ	"Joanna (Interlude)"	Plæygirl
2025	MØ	"Sweet"	Plæygirl
2025	MØ	"Plæygirl"	Plæygirl
2025	MØ	"Keep Moving"	Plæygirl
2025	MØ	"Lose Yourself"	Plæygirl
2025	MØ	"Vildchild"	Plæygirl
2025	MØ	"Heartbreak"	Plæygirl
2025	MØ	"Wake Me Up"	Plæygirl

=== Mr. Dream ===
Album	Release year
The Ultimate in Luxury	2014
Fatherland	2012
Trash Hit	2011
No Girls Allowed	2010
Mr. Dream Goes to Jail	2009
