= Plæygirl =

Studio album by MØ
- Released: 16 May 2025
- Recorded: 2022–2024
- Genre: Pop
- Length: 35:24
- Labels: RCA; Sony UK
- Producers: Nick Sylvester; Ronni Vindahl; SLY; Elliot Kozel

MØ chronology
Motordrome (2022)	Plæygirl (2025)

Singles from Plæygirl
- 1. "Who Said" Released: 17 October 2024; 2. "Sweet" Released: 28 January 2025; 3. "Keep Moving" Released: 21 March 2025; 4. "Lose Yourself" Released: 2 May 2025; 5. "Heartbreak" Released: 15 May 2025

Plæygirl is the fourth studio album by Danish singer and songwriter MØ. It was released on 16 May 2025, via RCA Records and Sony Music UK. It marks her first album in three years, since her third studio album, Motordrome (2022). The album is produced by Nick Sylvester and MØ's longtime collaborator Ronni Vindahl, and includes a collaboration with Irish singer and rapper, Biig Piig.

== Background ==
Plæygirl was written between 2022 and 2024 in Copenhagen and Los Angeles, according to MØ, the album reflects her most authentic and liberated self, as she aimed to create music that feels "true to me" and "free". Comprising 12 tracks, the project represents what she describes as her most authentic and liberated self. "I just wanted to make music that was true to me – music that feels free. I feel like I'm standing in front of a new era", she explained. MØ collaborated with producer Nick Sylvester and her longtime creative partner Ronni Vindahl throughout the process.

== Promotion ==
To support the album, MØ announced her debut Plæygirl live tour, beginning with five European shows in March 2025 following a launch event at London's Lexington.

=== Singles ===
The album's lead single, "Who Said", was released on 17 October 2024. "Sweet" featuring Irish singer and rapper Biig Piig was released as the album's second single, alongside the album announcement on 28 January 2025. "Keep Moving" was released as the album's third single on 21 March. The album's fourth single, "Lose Yourself", was released on 2 May. "Heartbreak", the album's fifth and final single, was released on 15 May 2025.

=== Promotional singles ===
A cover of "Wake Me Up" by the late Swedish DJ and previous collaborator Avicii was released as the album's promotional single on 6 December.

== Critical reception ==
Plæygirl ratings
Review scores
Source	Rating
The Arts Desk	4/5 stars
DIY	3.5/5 stars
Jenesaispop	3/5 stars
Soundvenue	5/6 stars
Stereoboard	3/5 stars

Plæygirl received mostly favourable reviews from music critics. Writing for Soundvenue, critic Kjartan F. Stolberg described it as "a return to the unpolished, uncompromising, and intuitive pop music that defined MØ's on No Mythologies to Follow (2014) and stating that Plæygirl "is her strongest and most character-rich album since then." Similarly, Thomas H Green of The Arts Desk also praised MØ's characteristic sound, noticing that she "remains girl-ish but also conveys, somehow, the lived life and lost loves of a woman in her mid-30s, an indie sensibility, a shyness." DIY gave Plæygirl a 3.5 out of 5 star rating, noting that the album presents the Danish alt-pop artist at a pivotal moment, highlighting the tension between her distinctive dark pop style and the shadow cast by her earlier commercial success. Sarah Taylor of Stereoboard wrote that the album broadly balances intimate sad-girl pop with buoyant electro anthems, calling it timely and refreshing, though a few steps removed from MØ's best work.

== Track listing ==
Plæygirl track listing
No.	Title	Writer(s)	Producer(s)	Length
1.	"Meat on a Stick"	Karen Marie Ørsted; Elliott Kozel; Rasmus Littauer; Sylvester Sivertsen; Nick Sylvester	Sylvester; Kozel^{[a]}; Hamish Patrick^{[a]}; Matthew Neighbour^{[a]}	2:28
2.	"Who Said"	Ørsted; Clementine Douglas; Karin Dreijer; Olof Bjorn Dreijer; Sylvester; Ronni Vindahl	Sylvester	3:07
3.	"Knife"	Ørsted; Finn Keane; Madison Love; Sylvester	Sylvester; EasyFun; Patrick^{[a]}; Neighbour^{[a]}	3:04
4.	"Without You"	Ørsted; Littauer; Sylvester	Sylvester; Patrick^{[a]}; Neighbour^{[a]}	2:49
5.	"Joanna (Interlude)"	Kim Larsen	Sylvester	1:00
6.	"Sweet" (featuring Biig Piig)	Ørsted; Biig Piig; Sylvester; Sivertsen	Sylvester; Sly	2:56
7.	"Plæygirl"	Ørsted; Littauer; Kozel; Sylvester	Sylvester; Kozel^{[a]}; Patrick^{[a]}; Neighbour^{[a]}; Mary Lattimore^{[a]}	2:43
8.	"Keep Moving"	Ørsted; Littaeur; Kozel; Sylvester	Sylvester; Kozel; Patrick^{[a]}; Neighbour^{[a]}	3:22
9.	"Lose Yourself"	Ørsted; Douglas; Micah Jasper; Littauer; Stint; Sylvester; Vindahl	Sylvester; Vindahl; Patrick^{[a]}; Neighbour^{[a]}; Jasper^{[a]}	2:54
10.	"Vildchild"	Ørsted; Kozel; Littauer; Sylvester; Vindahl	Sylvester; Vindahl; Kozel^{[a]}; Patrick^{[a]}; Neighbour^{[a]}	3:40
11.	"Heartbreak"	Ørsted; Kristoffer Fogelmark; Albin Nedler; Siversten; Sylvester	Sylvester; Sly; Patrick^{[a]}; Neighbour^{[a]}; Nedler^{[a]}^{[v]}; Fogelmark^{[a]}^{[v]}	3:06
12.	"Wake Me Up"	Tim Bergling; Egbert Dawkins; Michael Einzinger	Sylvester	4:15
Total length:				35:24

=== Notes ===
- ^{^{^[a]}} signifies an additional producer.
- ^{^{^[v]}} signifies a vocal producer.
- "Sweet" is stylized in all caps.
- "Keep Moving" is stylized as "Keep Møving".

== Personnel ==
Credits were adapted from Tidal.

=== Musicians ===
- Karen Marie Ørsted – vocals
- Nick Sylvester – synthesizer (tracks 1, 3–11), piano (1, 5), programming (4, 6–8), vocoder (5), background vocals (8)
- Elliott Kozel – guitar (tracks 1, 6–8, 10), programming (6, 7)
- Rasmus Littauer – guitar (track 1), drums (10)
- Finn Keane – synthesizer (track 3)
- Mary Lattimore – harp (tracks 6, 7)
- Harrison Patrick Smith – synthesizer (track 8)
- Adam Moerder – drum machine (tracks 9, 10)
- Robert Szmurlo – drum machine (tracks 9, 10)
- Micah Jasper – guitar, synthesizer (track 9)
- Ronni Vindahl – guitar, synthesizer (track 9)
- Albin Nedler – programming, synthesizer (track 11)
- Sylvester Sivertsen – programming, synthesizer (track 11)

=== Technical ===
- Ruiari O'Flaherty – mastering
- Lars Stalfors – mixing (tracks 1–4, 6–12)
- Nick Sylvester – mixing (track 5), engineering (1, 3–5, 7–11)
- Karen Marie Ørsted – engineering (tracks 1, 3–5, 7–11)
- Robert Szmurlo – engineering (tracks 1, 3, 4, 7–11)
- Christian Refer – engineering (tracks 1, 4, 7–10)
- Mads Mølgaard Helbæk – engineering (tracks 1, 4, 7–10)
- Elliott Kozel – engineering (tracks 1, 7, 8)
- Mary Lattimore – engineering (track 7)
- Micah Jasper – engineering (track 9)
- Ronni Vindahl – engineering (track 10)
- Albin Nedler – engineering (track 11)
- Sylvester Sivertsen – engineering (track 11)

== Release history ==
Release dates and formats for Plæygirl
Region	Date	Format	Label	Ref.
Various	16 May 2025	LP; CD; Digital download; streaming	RCA; Sony UK	
