= Sweet (MØ song) =

2025 single by MØ featuring Biig Piig

Single by MØ featuring Biig Piig

from the album Plæygirl
- Released: 28 January 2025
- Genre: Pop
- Length: 2:56
- Label: Sony UK
- Songwriters: Karen Marie Ørsted; Biig Piig; Nick Sylvester; Sylvester Sivertsen
- Producers: Nick Sylvester; SLY

MØ singles chronology
"Who Said" (2025)	"Sweet" (2025)	"Keep Moving" (2025)

Biig Piig singles chronology
"One Way Ticket" (2025)	"Sweet" (2025)

Music video
- "Sweet" on YouTube

"Sweet" is a song by the Danish singer-songwriter MØ featuring Irish singer Biig Piig. It was released on 28 January 2025, through Sony Music UK, as the second single from her fourth studio album, Plæygirl.

== Background ==
In discussing the direction of her upcoming album, MØ described the song as emblematic of the project's overarching themes. She explained that "Sweet is a fun and sweet song wrapped into a mean bass synth riff (thanks to Nick Sylvester). The line 'I don't go to clubs / I go to comic cons and thrash metal shows' is this album's battle cry", and "it speaks to the feeling of kinda being an outsider, but being proud of, and embracing that outsider status as part of who I am. I don't enjoy going to clubs! I like playing The Sims and going to punk and metal shows and spending time with my friends and family. I think a lot of people can relate to that."

== Composition ==
According to Acid Tag, "Sweet" wastes "no time in bringing the power to the masses," with commanding drums that establish a forceful tone from the outset, offering MØ's vocals a strong platform to build upon. The track features a robust bass foundation and buzzing synths that, despite their intensity, leave ample room for its catchy melodies to take the lead. The song also has been described by Clash as "buoyant, bubbly pop music," showcasing a lighter and more playful side of MØ's artistry. The track features a guest appearance from pop-soul artist Biig Piig, whose contribution adds a soulful dimension to the upbeat production.

== Track listing ==
- Digital download and streaming
1. "Sweet" (featuring Biig Piig) – 2:56
- Digital download and streaming – Spotify
1. "Sweet" (featuring Biig Piig) – 2:56
2. "Wake Me Up" – 4:15
3. "Who Said" – 3:07

== Personnel ==
Credits adapted from Apple Music.

- Karen Marie Ørsted — vocals, composer, lyrics
- Nick Sylvester — producer, composer, lyrics, synthesizer, programming
- Elliott Kozel — programming, guitar
- Biig Piig — featured artist, vocals, composer, lyrics
- Mary Lattimore — harp
- Sylvester Willy Sivertsen — producer, composer, lyrics

== Release history ==
"Sweet" release history
Region	Date	Format(s)	Label	Ref.
Various	28 January 2025	Digital download; streaming	Sony UK	
