= Goosebumps (MØ song) =

- An image used in the song's audio video

Single by MØ

from the album Motordrome
- Released: 12 November 2021
- Recorded: 2019
- Length: 3:17
- Label: Sony UK
- Songwriters: Karen Marie Ørsted; Jakob Littauer
- Producer: Jakob Littauer

MØ singles chronology
"Kindness" (2021)	"Goosebumps" / "Brad Pitt" (2021)	"New Moon" (2022)

Music video
- "Goosebumps" on YouTube

"Goosebumps" is a song by Danish singer and songwriter MØ. It was released on 12 November 2021 as the fourth single from her third studio album Motordrome (2022), alongside "Brad Pitt".

== Background ==
"Goosebumps" was released on November 12, 2021, as part of a double single with "Brad Pitt". The release followed MØ's earlier 2021 singles "Kindness" and "Live to Survive", all of which later appeared on her third studio album Motordrome. In discussing the two tracks, MØ explained that they both deal with themes of self-identity and liberation: "Both songs are, in each their way, about remembering who you are. Remember that you can shine? Remember there's a chance of breaking out of the prison that is your mind? To actively move your body out of the loop and into the world".

MØ revealed that "Goosebumps" was one of the first songs she began writing for the album and described it as one of its more vulnerable moments, relying heavily on acoustic instrumentation. The song, which includes the lyric "don't let the fear eat up your mind", was written during the autumn of 2019 after a period of burnout and panic attacks. Reflecting on its creation, she explained that the track marked a cathartic and deeply personal experience that reignited her passion for music: "I hadn't really been writing any songs for a long time. So when I started writing ['Goosebumps'], it was the first time I tried to record what I was actually feeling... this was the first time in a long time that I just felt the light running through me again – that creative urge to express something". In a Consequence's Track by Track commentary, she recalled composing it at the piano in her basement, where the opening line "Come on easy rider, lift your voice up to the sky" emerged spontaneously, describing how songwriting unlocked emotions that ordinary thinking and talking could not.

== Composition ==
Slant Magazine noted that MØ's vocal delivery adds a sense of drama to the track, pointing out how her pronunciation of words like "body" in "Goosebumps" heightens its expressive quality. The song, built around stripped-back piano balladry and acoustic textures, also features what the review described as a playful flourish, likening one vocal effect to a toad-like "ribbit" at the end of a verse. MXDWN described it as "an even more dramatic track with deep pauses, led by a soft piano and MØ's beautiful voice".

== Music video ==
"Goosebumps" is accompanied by a video shot in the aftermath of Andersen's hometown show at Copenhagen's Den Grå Hal.

== Critical reception ==
The Independent described "Goosebumps" as featuring "an echoey piano" that supports MØ as she sings about the fear that can "eat up your mind", though the review noted that the track's "vampiric mopey mood" tends to meander in search of a melody.
