= On the Regular =

Single by Shamir

from the album Ratchet
- Released: October 28, 2014
- Genre: Hip house
- Length: 2:56
- Label: XL
- Songwriter(s): Shamir Bailey; Nick Sylvester
- Producer(s): Nick Sylvester

Shamir singles chronology
"If It Wasn't True" (2014)	"On the Regular" (2014)	"Call It Off" (2015)

"On the Regular" is a song recorded by American musician Shamir. It was released by XL Recordings on October 28, 2014. "On the Regular" is also featured on Shamir's 2015 debut album Ratchet.

The song features a prominent rhythm with cowbell and heavy bass. Shamir uses an androgynous falsetto, delivering rhymes in contrast to his singing on Northtown. The lyrics are an unrelated set of observations. Shamir taunts others and brags about his style. In the song's bridge, he switches from rapping to innocent, soulful singing. Music critics referenced Azealia Banks' 2011 debut single "212" for its bassline, dance beat, and playful reinvention of urban music. The Fader likened the song's "bubblegum hip-hop" to a younger-sounding Leif.

It had viral success in the United Kingdom, and it reached number 36 on the Billboard Twitter Emerging Artists chart. The attention brought by "On the Regular" allowed Shamir to embark on a European tour in late 2014. It placed 68th on the 2014 Pazz & Jop poll of music critics. Pitchfork Media named it the 11th best track of 2014, Drowned in Sound placed the song 18th on its year-end list, and BlackBook magazine ranked the song 12th.

The music video for "On the Regular" was directed by Anthony Sylvester, brother of the song's producer Nick Sylvester. It shows Shamir with different hairstyles, flashy patterns, and a fringe jacket. He plays with a rubber band gun and makes balloons burst into color.

== Cover Versions ==
The French-Israeli duo Shirane Music released a cover version of the song in 2015. It was first aired on Israel's national radio station Reshet Gimmel during the duo's weekly radio show "Under the Cover" on August 21, 2015. Shamir reacted to the release on his official Twitter account calling it "Amazing".
