= Gorilla vs. Bear =

Independent music blog

- Website type: MP3 blog
- Available in: English
- Creators: Chris Cantalini, David Bartholow
- Website: gorillavsbear.net
- Registration: None
- Launched: March 2005
- Current status: Online

Gorilla vs. Bear is an MP3 blog for independent music MP3s, videos, news, and reviews from all genres. It was created by Chris Cantalini in March 2005, and David Bartholow joined as a contributor in 2006. Gorilla vs. Bear regularly features unknown, established, and independent unsigned artists. The blog is also known for its use of Polaroid film and Holga cameras for artist portraiture and live music coverage. It has received a number of accolades.

== History ==
In 2006, Sirius Satellite Radio selected Gorilla vs. Bear as one of their hosts of "Blog Radio," a weekly radio program on the college/indie rock channel Left of Center. Currently, it is available on the channel Sirius XMU.

Since the 2010 South By Southwest music festival, Gorilla vs. Bear has curated a small showcase entitled Gorilla vs. Booze.

== Awards ==
- 2007: "mp3 Blog of the Year" by The Morning News.
- 2008: One of the web's "Best Music Blogs", "Best in Rock" issue, Rolling Stone.
- 2008: "Best Music Blog" of 2008 by URB.
- 2009: One of "25 Best Music Websites" by The Independent.
- 2011: Nominated for Best Independent Music Blog, MTV O Music Awards (OMA).

== Album of the Year ==
Year	Artist	Album	Source
2006	The Knife	Silent Shout	
2007	Panda Bear	Person Pitch	
2008	White Denim	Exposion	
2009	White Denim	Fits	
2010	Beach House	Teen Dream	
2011	Shabazz Palaces	Black Up	
2012	Chromatics	Kill for Love	
2012	Grimes	Visions	
2013	Autre Ne Veut	Anxiety	
2014	Shabazz Palaces	Lese Majesty	
2015	Grimes	Art Angels	
2016	A Tribe Called Quest	We Got It from Here... Thank You 4 Your Service	
2017	Yaeji	Yaeji	
2017	Yaeji	EP2	
2018	Tirzah	Devotion	
2019	Lana Del Rey	Norman Fucking Rockwell!	
2020	Helena Deland	Someone New	
2021	Magdalena Bay	Mercurial World	
2022	Jockstrap	I Love You Jennifer B	
2023	Nourished by Time	Erotic Probiotic 2	
2024	Cindy Lee	Diamond Jubilee	
2025	Oklou	Choke Enough	

Decade	Artist	Album	Source
2000s	Panda Bear	Person Pitch	
2010s	Grimes	Visions	
