= Brad Pitt (song) =

- An image used in the song's audio video

Single by MØ

from the album Motordrome
- B-side: "Goosebumps"
- Released: 12 November 2021
- Genre: Electro-pop
- Length: 3:01
- Label: Sony UK
- Songwriters: Karen Marie Ørsted; Ronni Vindahl; Ajay Bhattacharyya; Jakob Littauer; Michael Pollack; Mads Damsgaard; Daniel Schnair
- Producers: Jakob Littauer; Stint

MØ singles chronology
"Kindness" (2021)	"Brad Pitt" / "Goosebumps" (2021)	"New Moon" (2022)

Music video
- "Brad Pitt" on YouTube

"Brad Pitt" is a song by Danish singer and songwriter MØ. It was released on 12 November 2021, as the third single from her third studio album Motordrome (2022). The song serves as a double A-side alongside "Goosebumps". Following the earlier singles "Live to Survive" and "Kindness", the track was described by MØ as exploring themes of self-identity and liberation. NME called it a "euphoric burst of electro-pop", while critics highlighted its lyrics rejecting fame as a prerequisite for love. Its title references American actor Brad Pitt.

== Background ==
"Brad Pitt" was released in 12 November 2021, alongside "Goosebumps" as part of a double single, following MØ's earlier 2021 singles "Kindness" and "Live to Survive", all of which appear on her third studio album Motordrome. In discussing the release, MØ explained that both tracks are about "remembering who you are", reflecting on themes of self-identity and liberation. She elaborated, "Remember that you can shine? Remember there's a chance of breaking out of the prison that is your mind? To actively move your body out of the loop and into the world". On 1 November, she confirmed the track's title and shared a pre-save link, following earlier teasers on social media that included handwritten lyrics and a short clip on TikTok.

== Composition ==
NME described "Brad Pitt" as a "euphoric burst of electro-pop". It also has been described as a song in which MØ becomes the "anti-Shania Twain", offering a declaration of love in all circumstances. Whereas Twain once dismissed the allure of a movie star, MØ reassures her lover that fame is unnecessary to win her affection. The track is built on airy synths, with MØ singing, "You don't have to be born into success to get the blood pumping underneath my summer dress".

== Critical reception ==
The Skinny's Tara Hepburn described "Brad Pitt" as an ode to MØ's childhood crush and the actor's relationship with Juliette Lewis, noting that its refrain, "If we never make it, I'm OK with it", belies a deeper emotional tension. The author characterised the track as suitable for introspective moments and dancing through heartbreak.

== Charts ==
Weekly chart performance
Chart (2021)	Peak position
Denmark Airplay (Hitlisten)	2
