= Who Said (MØ song) =

2024 single by MØ

Single by MØ

from the album Plæygirl
- Released: 17 October 2024
- Length: 3:07
- Label: Sony UK
- Songwriters: Karen Marie Ørsted; Clementine Douglas; Nick Sylvester; Ronni Vindahl; Karin Dreijer; Olof Bjorn Dreijer
- Producer: Nick Sylvester

MØ singles chronology
| "Fake Chanel" (2024) | "Who Said" (2024) | "Sweet" (2025) |

Music video
- "Who Said" on YouTube

"Who Said" is a song by Danish singer-songwriter MØ. It was released on 17 October 2024, through Sony Music UK, as the lead single from her fourth studio album, Plæygirl (2025).

== Background and production ==
Following the tenth anniversary of her debut album, No Mythologies to Follow, MØ began her new chapter by releasing a single, "Who Said". Originally written as a demo in 2015 with producer Ronni Vindahl, it took shape years later during sessions between Copenhagen and Los Angeles, where she collaborated with producer Nick Sylvester and songwriter Clementine Douglas. She also stated that "one of the things that's a bit different between the new music and Motordrome is that on this album I mainly just worked with the one producer", adding that they had "very focused working time" together. MØ explained that creating music in this way allowed her to "really go into it on a very focused level" and to "create a sound with one other person", as she describes the experience as "more deep and wholesome".

== Composition ==
MØ explained that "Who Said" contains "really Scandi electronic" elements with "a minimalistic American retro feel". Running for three minutes and seven seconds, the track explores her "fear of commitment", as it incorporates "an addictive electronic loop and packing an insatiably catchy chorus". Ciaran Picker of Dork described the song as "an ode to youthful sass and swagger", which explores themes of re-establishing healthy relationships and putting oneself first, set over a "sumptuous, sunny soundscape." BroadwayWorld's Josh Sharpe characterised MØ's "Nordic roots" and the "lyrical introspection" of her previous album Motordrome; the track was described as balancing "playful energy" with "deeper reflections on change and commitment", featuring a "massive chorus".

== Personnel ==
Credits were adapted from Apple Music.

- Karen Marie Ørsted — vocals, songwriter
- Clementine Douglas — songwriter
- Nick Sylvester — producer, songwriter
- Ronni Vindahl — songwriter
- Karin Dreijer — songwriter
- Olof Bjorn Dreijer — songwriter
- Lars Stalfors — mixing engineer
- Ruairí O'Flaherty — mastering engineer

== Track listing ==
- Digital download and streaming
1. "Who Said" – 3:07
- Digital download and streaming – Remixes
1. "Who Said" (Vindahl edit) – 3:06
2. "Who Said" (Sassy 009 remix) – 2:22
3. "Who Said" – 3:07

== Release history ==
List of release dates, formats and versions
| Region | Date | Format | Version | Label | Ref. |
|---|---|---|---|---|---|
| Various | 17 October 2024 | Digital download; streaming | Original | Sony UK | |
| Various | 22 November 2024 | Digital download; streaming | Vindahl Edit | Sony UK | |
| Various | 22 November 2024 | Digital download; streaming | Sassy 009 remix | Sony UK | |
