= Hot Mass =

Electronic music dance party in Pittsburgh, Pennsylvania

Coordinates: 40.4457°N 79.9929°W

Hot Mass is an electronic music dance party held weekly since December 2012 below Club Pittsburgh, a private gay club and bathhouse in Pittsburgh, Pennsylvania, United States. The event indirectly grew out of Pittsburgh's LGBTQ, disco, and electronic music subcultures of the 1970s, 1980s, and 1990s. Critics have noted the experience and quality of music at Hot Mass is difficult to find elsewhere in the United States, comparing it favorably to European nightclubs and parties.

== Format ==
Hot Mass is usually held weekly on Saturday nights into Sunday mornings. One night per month is called Honcho, a specifically gay party. Hot Mass and Honcho parties take place on the second floor of a building at 1139 Penn Avenue owned by Club Pittsburgh, a private gay men's club and bathhouse. The party can legally remain open past the 2:00 am closing time imposed on bars and nightclubs because it is hosted at a private club; Hot Mass organizers charge an entrance fee for a membership.

== History ==
=== Background ===
During the 1970s and 1980s—at the height of disco's popularity and prior to the AIDS pandemic—at least three private social clubs in Pittsburgh which served gay clientele used their spaces to legally host afterhours dancing and drinking. These three clubs—Lucky's Transportation Club, House of Tilden, and Travelers—were owned and operated by Robert "Lucky" Johns and were popular nightlife spots frequented by LGBT and heterosexual patrons alike coming from as far as Ohio, West Virginia, and New York.

Throughout the 1990s there was an electronic music subculture in Pittsburgh which likely traced its origins to similar Internet chatroom-based movements in Detroit, Cleveland, Minneapolis, and across the United States. Pittsburgh promoters and DJs organized raves in warehouses, ice rinks, barns, and fields which eventually attracted thousands of attendees, some of whom were high school students or even younger. As the events grew more popular, they drew internationally known DJs such as Adam Beyer and Richie Hawtin. Pittsburgh rave culture itself spawned at least one well-known artist, the drum and bass DJ Dieselboy, who attended the University of Pittsburgh between 1990 and 1995. Eventually people began using raves as places to buy and sell drugs—including MDMA and Rohypnol—leading to Pittsburgh Police crackdowns on raves in 2000 and 2001. Continuing drug busts and new legislation put a stop to these kinds of events and, therefore, Pittsburgh's dance music subculture by 2002–2003.

=== Origins and growth ===
Aaron Clark moved to Pittsburgh as a college student in 2003. He was interested in house music and chose Pittsburgh partially because of its reputation for large raves, but he arrived too late to witness all but the vestiges of the 1990s subculture. Over time Clark met and started collaborating with Pittsburgh-based producers and promoters such as Steve Simpson, Paul Fleetwood, and Shawn Rudiman, who continued trying to book premier DJs for shows at Pittsburgh bars and clubs. In the late 2000s Clark became part of a DJ crew called Humanaut which eventually hosted its own electronic music parties, first at mainstream nightclubs and then at smaller venues.

Around the same time as Clark's move to Pittsburgh, artist and DJ Lauren Goshinski returned to the city from an exchange program in London, where she frequented Fabric nightclub and became enamored with house music. Looking for a similar milieu in Pittsburgh, Goshinski discovered afterhours live music at Shadow Lounge, a coffee shop allowed to host afterhours events as it did not have a liquor license. Eventually Goshinski started DJing and designing audiovisual experiences at Shadow Lounge and other Pittsburgh venues, ultimately leading to her founding the VIA Music Festival in 2010.

Clark and Goshinski met because Goshinski attended Humanaut parties, while Clark began working with her on the VIA festival. John McMarlin, the manager of Club Pittsburgh—inspired by the private Pittsburgh discos of the 1970s and 1980s and his experiences at DJ Larry Levan's "Saturday Mass" shows at Paradise Garage in New York City—convinced Clark to make the party a weekly occurrence. To manage the work needed to plan and host weekly parties, Hot Mass was split between four or five different rotating crews, including one known as Pittsburgh Track Authority.

Since 2014 the party has attracted many DJs to Pittsburgh, including The Black Madonna, Daniel Bell, Mike Servito, and Theo Parrish. Electronic music artist and DJ Yaeji credits Hot Mass with her "indoctrination into nightlife"; she regularly attended the party while studying at Carnegie Mellon University.

Hot Mass was on hiatus since March 2020 due to the ongoing COVID-19 pandemic, with the exception of a virtual New Year's Eve party held on the night of 31 December 2020–1 January 2021. Hot Mass resumed holding weekly events in May 2022.

=== Closure of Club Pittsburgh space, and move to new space ===
On February 6, 2025, Hot Mass announced an abrupt exit of their longtime venue built inside of Club Pittsburgh, and a quick move to a new undisclosed location. They have resumed parties on a bi-weekly schedule in the new space for the time being.

== Cultural impact ==
Critics have noted the experience and quality of music at Hot Mass is difficult to find elsewhere in the United States, comparing it favorably to European nightclubs and parties.
