= The Sky Is Bleeding =

Fourth EP by Irish artist Biig Piig, released 2021

EP by Biig Piig
- Released: 21 May 2021
- Genres: Pop, R&B
- Label: Sony Music
- Producer: Gianluca Buccellati

Biig Piig chronology
No Place for Patience, Vol. 3 (2019)	The Sky Is Bleeding (2021)	Bubblegum (2023)

Singles from The Sky Is Bleeding
- 1. "Lavender" Released: 16 April 2021

The Sky Is Bleeding is the fourth extended play (EP) by Irish singer Biig Piig. It was released on 21 May 2021 through Sony Music.

== Background and release ==
Prior to the release of The Sky Is Bleeding, Biig Piig announced the EP in April 2021, alongside the release of its lead and only single, "Lavender", which was accompanied by a music video.

Speaking at the time of the EP's announcement, Biig Piig described The Sky Is Bleeding as a project shaped by increased openness around sexuality, fantasy, and personal vulnerability, allowing her to explore themes she had not previously addressed in her music. The EP was written primarily in London before her relocation to Los Angeles and was produced with Gianluca Buccellati.

== Critical reception ==
Professional ratings
Review scores
Source	Rating
Pitchfork	6.5/10
NME	Positive
Dork	4/5
DIY	4.5/5 stars

The EP was mostly well received by critics.

== Tracklist ==
No.	Title	Length
1.	"Remedy"	2:34
2.	"Tarzan"	2:25
3.	"Baby Zombies"	3:54
4.	"Lavender"	3:11
5.	"Drugs"	3:38
6.	"American Beauty"	2:52
