= Kindness (MØ song) =

Single by MØ

from the album Motordrome
- Released: 30 July 2021
- Genre: Dance-pop
- Length: 3:15
- Label: Sony UK
- Songwriters: Karen Marie Ørsted; Ariel Rechtshaid; Jokob Littauer; Jam City
- Producer: Ariel Rechtshaid

MØ singles chronology
"Live to Survive" (2021)	"Kindness" (2021)	"Brad Pitt" / "Goosebumps" (2021)

Music video
- "Kindness" on YouTube

"Kindness" is a song by Danish singer and songwriter MØ. It was released on 30 July 2021 as the second single from her third studio album, Motordrome (2021). Co-written by Ariel Rechtshaid, Jokob Littauer and Jam City, the song serves as a love letter to MØ's fans. It was written during a period of social isolation and reflects on the connection and support she received from her online community. The track began as a demo in Copenhagen with Yangze, and was later developed in collaboration with Rechtshaid across time zones. Musically, "Kindness" has been described as an anthemic dance-pop track dedicated to her fans.

== Background ==
"Kindness" is a love letter to my fans. I wrote it at a time when I was feeling, like a lot of people, disconnected from the physical world. Despite being isolated, there was this beautiful connection and support from my fans and from our little online community, which I was so thankful for.

MØ released "Kindness" in 2021 as the follow-up to her comeback single "Live to Survive", marking her second new track of the year and her first releases since her 2018 album Forever Neverland. The song, described as a love letter to her fans, was co-written with Ariel Rechtshaid, Jam City, and Yangze. According to MØ, the track was written during a period of isolation when she felt disconnected from the physical world, yet continued to find support through her fan community online. The first demo was created in Copenhagen over a beat by Yangze, with Rechtshaid later contributing remotely, shaping the final version of the song through long-distance collaboration.

In the lead-up to its release, MØ previewed the song on TikTok and invited fans to submit choreography and creative ideas, stating that she would select some contributions to feature in the official music video. She later announced the release date as 30 July 2021, expressing excitement for fans to hear the full track and thanking them for their input.

== Composition ==
Consequence described "Kindness" as "an anthemic dose of dance pop" dedicated to MØ's fans. The Guardian described the song as having an "Ed Sheeran-like" quality.
