= Heterosexuality (album) =

2022 studio album by Shamir

Studio album by Shamir
- Released: February 11, 2022
- Genre: Industrial; synth-pop; avant-garde pop; noise pop; indie rock; lo-fi; shoegaze
- Length: 37:24
- Label: AntiFragile Music
- Producer: Hollow Comet

Shamir chronology
Shamir (2020)	Heterosexuality (2022)	Homo Anxietatem (2023)

Singles from Heterosexuality
- 1. "Gay Agenda" Released: October 12, 2021; 2. "Cisgender" Released: November 9, 2021; 3. "Reproductive" Released: January 13, 2022; 4. "Caught Up" Released: February 8, 2022

Heterosexuality is the eighth studio album by American singer-songwriter Shamir. It was released on February 11, 2022, by AntiFragile Music.

== Composition ==
Heterosexuality is an industrial, synth-pop, avant-garde pop, noise pop, indie rock, shoegaze, and lo-fi album with influences from R&B, dream pop alternative rock, alt-pop, industrial rap, new jack swing, tropicália, bossa nova, lounge pop, and art punk.

Lyrically, the album's ten tracks tell a narrative cycle, beginning with a trio of songs about "aggressive nonconformity as a political statement". On "Stability", Shamir expresses how that fight can take a toll and "unearths traumas, both universal ones and his own unique struggles". The album then "moves into a false, saccharine golden hour" with lyrics about "helplessness hardening into nihilism". On the last two songs, Shamir "entertains the slightest possibility of hope" and the fight returns.

== Reception ==
Professional ratings
Aggregate scores
Source	Rating
AnyDecentMusic?	7.7/10
Metacritic	79/100
Review scores
Source	Rating
AllMusic	3.5/5 stars
The A.V. Club	B
DIY	5/5 stars
Exclaim!	9/10
The Line of Best Fit	8/10
Loud and Quiet	8/10
MusicOMH	3/5 stars
Pitchfork	6.5
Rolling Stone	3.5/5 stars
The Skinny	4/5 stars

According to the review aggregator Metacritic, Heterosexuality received "generally favorable reviews" based on a weighted average score of 79 out of 100 from 13 critic scores. AnyDecentMusic? has an average of 7.7 of 10 from 14 ratings.

AllMusic's Heather Phares says "While its seeming contradictions make it a slightly more challenging listen than Shamir was, Heterosexuality acknowledges how complicated just existing can be with the wit, creativity, and unguarded emotions that have been a vital part of Shamir's music since the beginning." The A.V. Club's Max Freedman writes "Now that [Shamir]'s growing to love himself, he can finally start loving other people anew, too. It's been a long time coming, but Heterosexuality is an engaging way for it to arrive." DIY's Ben Tipple says the album "provides space for a poignant message, one that supersedes outdated expectations." Exclaim!'s Rachel Kelly writes that "Shamir is economical with this album — not a bar or lyric is wasted, every moment is carefully curated to hit exactly where it needs to. This precision is why the album works so beautifully. Heterosexuality captivates and transports the listener, making an ethereal landscape out of dissonance and nihilism. It never repeats itself, it does not stutter, and it absolutely never apologizes."

The Line of Best Fit's Sam Franzini says "Heterosexuality is an interesting title choice for an album for which norm-subverting is wholly within the music; it'd be like Björk titling an album Disco. But this album has it all, and listeners who crave forward-thinking, statement-making pop will find homes with 'Gay Agenda', 'Cisgender', and 'Abomination', while those less involved can relax with the jams of 'Cold Brew', 'Nuclear', and 'Stability'". Loud and Quiet's Guia Cortassa writes that "there's more than enough to be mesmerised by in the multifaceted talent of this chameleonic artist." Pitchfork's Peyton Thomas says the album "stands as a powerful alternative to the zero-calorie pride anthems that pepper the pop charts every June."

=== Year-end lists ===
Heterosexuality on year-end lists
Publication	#	Ref.
Billboard	47	
PopMatters	50	
Sound Opinions (Jim DeRogatis)	20	
Sound Opinions (Greg Kot)	18	
Treble	42	

== Track listing ==
All tracks are written by Shamir.

Heterosexuality track listing
No.	Title	Length
1.	"Gay Agenda"	2:48
2.	"Cisgender"	5:05
3.	"Abomination"	2:43
4.	"Stability"	3:10
5.	"Caught Up"	3:23
6.	"Father"	3:57
7.	"Cold Brew"	3:48
8.	"Marriage"	3:21
9.	"Reproductive"	4:35
10.	"Nuclear"	4:27
Total length:		37:24

== Personnel ==
- Shamir Bailey – vocals, guitar (2, 4–6, 8–10), bass (4, 5, 8–10)
- Hollow Comet – producer, guitar (2, 5, 8, 9)
- Justin Tailor – mixing engineer
- Ryan Schwabe – mastering engineer
- Kyle Pulley – recording engineer (2, 4, 5, 7–10)
- Danny Murillo – assistant recording engineer (4, 5, 7–10), drums (4, 5, 9, 10), bass (10), Rhodes piano (10)
- Eric Bogacz – vocal producer (1, 2, 7)
