= Kim Chapiron =

French film director and screenwriter

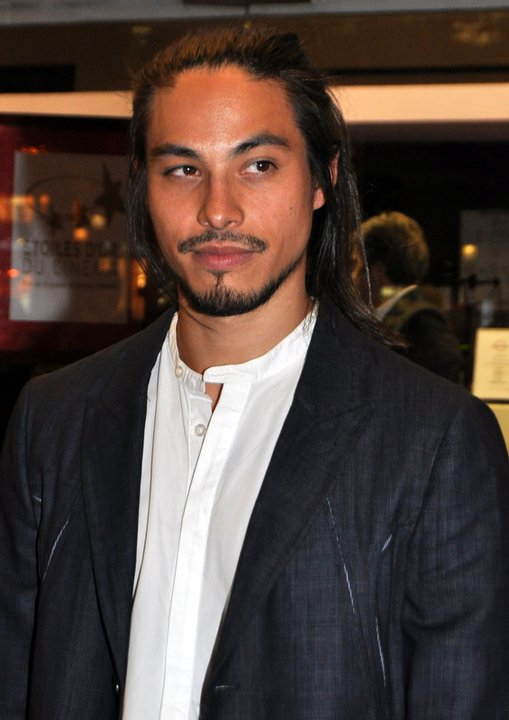
- Chapiron in 2011
- Born: 4 July 1980 (age 45); Paris, France
- Occupations: Film director, screenwriter
- Years active: 1995–present
- Partner: Ludivine Sagnier
- Children: 2
- Relatives: Mai Lan (sister)

Kim Chapiron (born 4 July 1980) is a French film director, screenwriter, and musician of Vietnamese descent.

== Biography ==
Of Vietnamese origin by his mother, Chapiron is the son of graphic designer Christian Chapiron, better known as Kiki Picasso, and the brother of singer and stylist Mai Lan.

In 1995, he created the collective "Kourtrajmé" with the director Romain Gavras. The same year, the two directors met for a science fiction short entitled Paradoxe Perdu. They play the only two main characters. Chapiron filmed more than twenty short films mixing action and comedy (compiled in 2003 in the double DVD Seigneur ne leur pardonnez pas car ils savent ce qu'ils font).

February 2006 saw the release of Sheitan, Kim Chapiron's first feature film that won the closing screening of Midnight Madness at the 2005 Toronto International Film Festival and was selected at various festivals, including the Festival international du film fantastique de Gérardmer, the Melbourne International Film Festival and the Tribeca Film Festival.

His second film Dog Pound produced by Partizan Films, shot in 2008, shows the daily life of three minors in a prison in Montana, U.S.

He won Best New Narrative Filmmaker 2010 at the Tribeca Film Festival.

In August 2012, he began shooting his third feature film, La Crème de la crème. The action takes place in a large French business school (close to HEC) and tells the adventures of three students who decide to set up a prostitution network within the school. On the day of the film's release, 1 April 2014 he declared in Canal+'s Grand Journal that he found streaming pornography "quite incredible". Alongside pornography, he recalled the existence of love that the younger generations must not forget. Pornography, sexuality and love are precisely three themes of La Crème de la crème.

In March 2017, he was a member of the jury for the fourth edition of the Rennes International Short Film Festival and also for the seventh Moon Festival.

In June 2024, Chapiron signed a petition addressed to French President Emmanuel Macron demanding France to officially recognize the State of Palestine.

== Filmography ==
- Sheitan (2006)
- Dog Pound (2010)
- La Crème de la crème (2014)
- Guyane (2016–2017) TV 4 episodes

== Personal life ==
Chapiron is the partner of actress and model Ludivine Sagnier, with whom he has two daughters.
