= EP2 (Yaeji EP) =

EP by Yaeji
- Released: November 3, 2017
- Studios: Godmode Studio, Los Angeles
- Genres: House; trap
- Length: 18:05
- Label: Godmode
- Producers: Yaeji; Nick Sylvester

Yaeji chronology
Yaeji (2017)	EP2 (2017)	What We Drew 우리가 그려왔던 (2020)

Singles from EP2
- 1. "Passionfruit" Released: May 22, 2017; 2. "Drink I'm Sippin On" Released: October 2, 2017; 3. "Raingurl" Released: October 30, 2017

EP2 is the second extended play by Korean-American electronic musician Kathy Yaeji Lee, known by her stage name as Yaeji. It was released on November 3, 2017 by the label Godmode, and produced by Lee with Godmode founder Nick Sylvester. A trap and house record, it features a cover of the song "Passionfruit" by Canadian rapper Drake. Promoted with three singles and two music videos, one of which Lee directed, EP2 garnered favorable reviews from critics and was ranked the best album of the year by Gorilla vs. Bear. Commercially, the EP hit No. 5 on Billboard's American Dance/Electronic Album Sales chart.

== Production ==
EP2 was produced by Lee and Sylvester. The making of each song began with Lee writing the lyrics and coming up with concepts on how the instrumental would be produced in Ableton. She then sent her ideas to Sylvester. As he said in an interview, "Maybe I'll replace certain parts or rearrange them, or I'll send it back to her and be like, 'I think this could be better.'" Once the songs' conception was completed, the two went to Godmode's Los Angeles studio to record their final versions.

== Composition ==
Fusing trap and house music, EP2 continues Lee's transition "from minimalism through gentle synths to flows of underground house beats," in her music, as Earmilk described. Pitchfork writer Sasha Geffen analyzed the record, noting that it differs from Yaeji's debut EP in that it contains "deep, ebbing backbeats and heavy rumbles of bass" to "contrast" her singing. Journalist Kate Solomon wrote that the songs are "mesmerisingly repetitive, weaving trance-like textures as Yaeji rolls repeated phrases around depth-plumbing beats." The 405 described EP2's sound as having a "low-passed nature" that "adds a characteristic warmness which is central to Yaeji’s aura." On the EP, Lee sings in a hushed tone through auto-tune and reverb; her lyrics are a combination of the English and Korean languages, with the "secretive or private" stuff being sung in Korean.

== Lyrical themes ==
EP2 deals with feelings of displacement, which Lee had while being raised between Atlanta and Korea. She described herself as being "misunderstood" when living in both places: "I didn't look like anyone I was surrounded by in Atlanta. They didn't know where Korea was. When I lived in Korea, I was way more fluent in English, and couldn't articulate myself in Korean, even though everyone else looked like me." Geffen noted that EP2 is about "what it's like to care from far away, through an obstacle that won't budge. [...] she’s not casting judgment on that obstacle. She's just noticing the barriers that crop up between people despite their better efforts and trying, with a little sub-bass, to echolocate their foundations."

Concepts of mental health are presented on songs like "Feelings Change", where she sings in a monotone voice "doing so fine" and admits that "I've missed all my chances to be so honest." Feminist themes are also explored on "Raingurl" and "After That," tracks that deal with "the struggles of women's senses of freedom under societal restrictions." Office magazine said that EP2 has a "duality" that is typical for Yaeji's music, using "Raingurl" as an example, as it contains both introspective verses and a "joyfully hedonistic chorus."

== Release and promotion ==
EP2 included a cover of Drake's song "Passionfruit", which was first released on May 22, 2017.

On October 2, 2017, "Drink I'm Sippin On" and its Anthony Sylvester-directed music video was released. The video involves Lee walking and riding a bike through Chinatown with friends in the nighttime. The blazer worn in the video was designed by Lee and inspired by a photograph taken in the 1980s of her mother's oversized blazer: "It looked comfortable, beautiful, and oddly empowering." "Drink I'm Sippin On" garnered a "Best New Track" honor from Pitchfork, and the video garnered more than 2.5 million views shortly more than a month after it was released.

The third single from EP2 was "Raingurl," issued on October 30, 2017. On November 16, i-D released the video for the song, which Lee directed with her friend Enayet. Lee described it as an "introspection" of huge dance clubs. The video was her first experience in working with special effects, including making fog and a program that controlled the light in the umbrella that she was holding in the video. The song reached No. 48 on Billboard's list of the "Best Songs of 2017."

Godmode released EP2 only in digital download and streaming formats on November 3, 2017.

== Critical reception ==
Professional ratings
Review scores
Source	Rating
The 405	8/10
NME	4/5 stars
Pitchfork	8.1/10
Resident Advisor	3.8/5
Tiny Mix Tapes	3.5/5 marks

Stereogum opined that "even if you know [the three tracks that were released before EP2 ('Passionfruit', 'Drink I'm Sippin On,' and 'Raingurl'),] it's cool to hear them all strung together, to dive into the vibe they create. And the two new songs, 'Feelings Change' and 'After That', are very good as well." The 405 critic William Morrow claimed that "EP2 showcases Yaeji’s strengths as both a vocalist and producer, boasting new ideas whilst maintaining all of the elements that made people fall in love with her in the first place." He spotlighted the "detailed, intricate production" of the EP, noting that it "allows for a satisfyingly rich sound that simultaneously doesn't call unnecessary attention to itself." Gorilla vs. Bear placed the EP in the No. 1 spot in its year-end list of best albums, saying, "Similar to the experience of hearing Grimes for the first time, there's an obvious special, one-of-a-kind quality that just radiates from everything she does".

Los Angeles Times critic August Brown said that EP2 and Yaeji's self-titled EP didn't fit into a specific genre, "which is probably why this young woman rapping in Korean while DJing tripped-out breakbeats and left-field house now plays to thousands." Baeble Music called the EP a "perfect combination of house, trap, rap, and quirky humor", praising its unique ability to be "extremely introspective" lyrically and soundwise, to "intertwine the classic house bass with an intimate lyrical voice". Resident Advisor critic Andrew Ryce wrote that the record "lays out the instant appeal of Lee's music, especially to new and younger dance music fans." He praised it for having more "assertive" lyrical content than Yaeji's prior EP, though he found a few parts of the lyrics to be "odd."

== Accolades ==
Publication	Accolade	Rank	Ref.
BrooklynVegan	Top 50 Albums of 2017	30	
Gorilla vs. Bear	Albums of 2017	1	
Pitchfork	50 Best Albums of 2017	50	
Pitchfork	The 20 Best Electronic Albums of 2017	6	
Stereogum	25 Great EPS of 2017	*	
"*" indicates an unordered list.

== Track listing ==
Track lengths derived from Apple Music. All songs written and produced by Yaeji and Nick Sylvester. "Passionfruit" is a cover of a song originally written by Aubrey Graham and Nana Rogues.

No.	Title	Length
1.	"Feelings Change"	2:35
2.	"Raingurl"	3:57
3.	"Drink I'm Sippin On"	3:21
4.	"After That"	3:38
5.	"Passionfruit"	4:34
Total length:		18:05

== Release history ==
Region	Date	Format(s)	Label
Worldwide	November 3, 2017	Digital download; streaming	Godmode

== Charts ==
Chart (2017)	Peak position
US Dance/Electronic Album Sales (Billboard)	5
