= Mai Lan =

French-Vietnamese singer (born 1982)

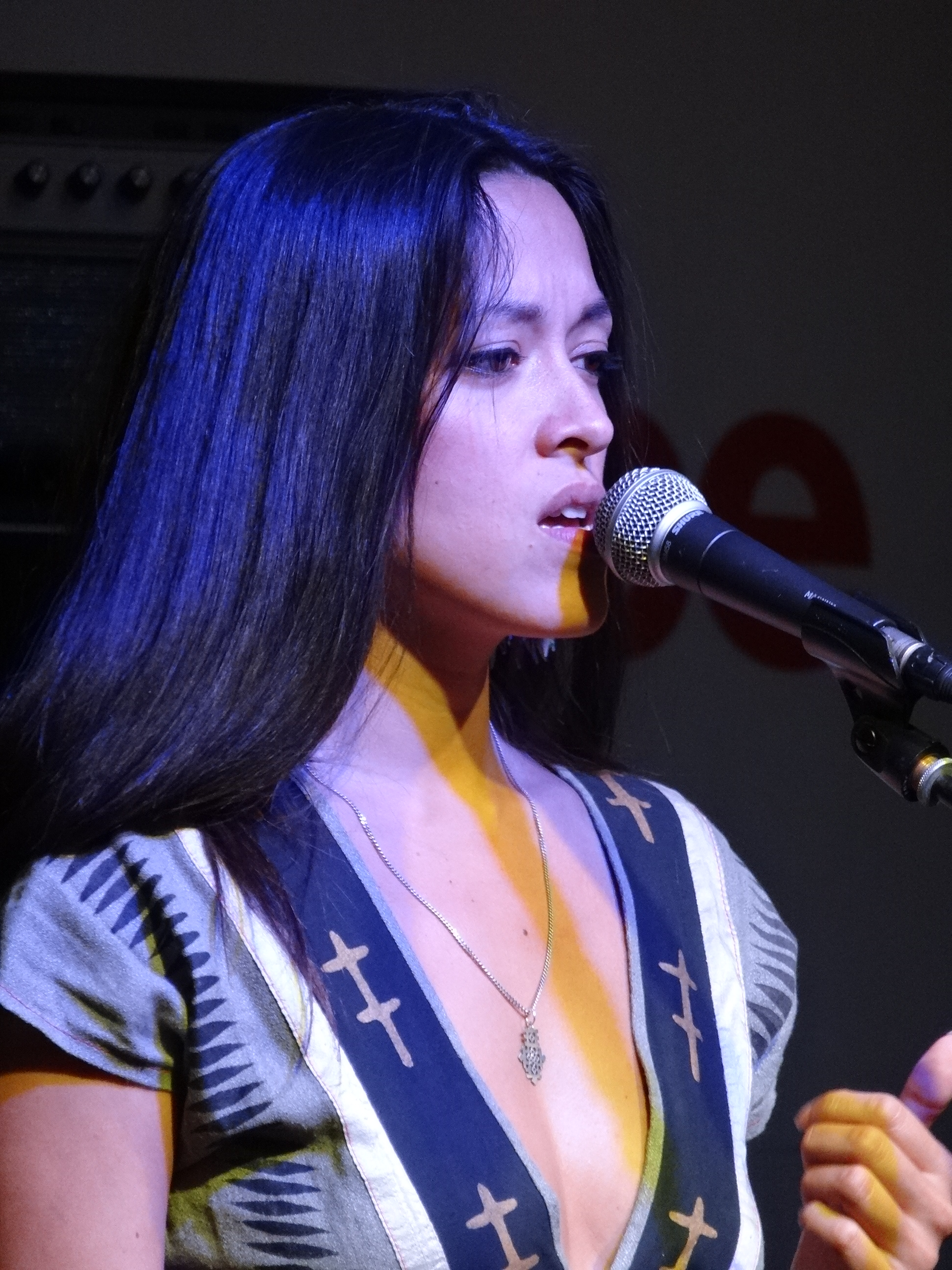
- Mai Lan performing
- Born: Mai-Lan Chapiron; 1982 (age 43–44); Paris, France
- Occupations: Singer, songwriter
- Years active: 1996-present
- Parent: Christian Chapiron (Kiki Picasso)
- Relatives: Kim Chapiron (brother)

Mai-Lan Aquarella Morgane Chapiron (stylized as MAI LAN) is a French-Vietnamese artist. She released her first solo album Mai Lan in 2012. In 2016, she appeared on M83's album Junk, contributing with vocals on four tracks, including the single "Go!". In 2017, she released her next major work, the Vampire EP. Her next full-length album, Autopilote, debuted on 19 January 2018.

== Biography ==
Mai Lan was born in Paris in 1982, as the daughter of visual artist Christian Chapiron, better known as Kiki Picasso. Born into a family of artists, she became a member of the collective Kourtrajmé 3.

In 2006, Mai Lan recorded five tracks for the soundtrack of French erotic comedy horror film Sheitan, which was directed by her brother, Kim Chapiron. She contributed vocals to the tracks "Arrêt De Souffle", "Gentiment Je T'immole", "Serpent" (with Nguyen Lê), "Berceuse" (with Nguyen Lê), and "Découverte Maison" (with Nguyen Lê).

With her friend Bezem Kassan, Mai Lan created the women's fashion brand BEZEMYMAILAN.

=== Solo career ===
==== Debut album ====
On 10 September 2012, Mai Lan released her debut album, the eponymous Mai Lan, including songs in both English and French. The album was produced by Max Labarthe and released on the independent labels 3ème Bureau / Wagram Music. The album spanned two singles, "Easy" and "Les Huîtres". The video for the latter was directed by French-Chilean musician, director, and actor Adan Jodorowsky, son of renowned filmmaker and author Alejandro Jodorowsky.

As written by Neil C. Yeung:

"Her debut self-titled 2012 LP was a genre-smashing exercise in rap, sampling, and pop, echoing CSS, Feist, and Yelle. Produced by Max Labarthe, Mai Lan also featured French producers Nikkfurie and Orelsan on the track 'Les Huitres'."

==== "Technique" ====
On 3 June 2016, Mai Lan released her single "Technique", co-written with Max Labarthe and Nick Sylvester.

The song is "a dizzy rush of a solo track that finds fun ways to play around with the idea that we’re all on the internet way too much". Mai Lan explained:

"This song came to life after a running joke we used to make with Max when we were recording the album in New York. Every time we'd do something 'technical' (it was most of the time stupid stuff) we'd snap and say proudly 'technique'."

The video for the song was directed by French studio PANAMÆRA.

==== "Haze" ====
On 16 November 2016, Mai Lan released her single "Haze", produced by Nick Sylvester. The song is "warped, insular synthetic pop music, and the video, from 'Technique' directors PANAMÆRA, shows Mai Lan singing in a dark room full of dry ice steam, while a mysterious orb of light revolves around her."

Mai Lan comments:

"Haze is a timeless and foggy space, between life and death, where I'm attempting to reach a loved one who is no more. I miss her presence, her love. I lost a bit of light, I'm not as strong. Would I be more serene to know her close, watching over me? I'm waiting for a sign."

It is the second single from the "Vampire" EP. The video for the song was directed by French studio PANAMÆRA.

==== "Vampire" ====
On 26 January 2017, Mai Lan released her single "Vampire", co-written with Anthony Gonzalez of M83. The song is "a big, shiny, bouncy pop song", and the video, from 'Technique' and 'Haze' directors PANAMÆRA, shows Mai Lan starring 'as the leader of a sexy vampire crew who take over an aging lounge lizard's mansion and eventually turn him into lunch.'

Mai Lan writes:

"'Vampire' is a joyful, festive threat.

In this song, I am a vampire who explains there is no way to escape and how I will devour you. It is a trip, a kind of egosferatrip. I always liked the narrow limit between a frightening and a funny atmosphere, that fuzzy half-smile. We wrote this song with Anthony Gonzalez (M83) at Los Angeles, in his studio. He sent me a demo, and I started working on the lyrics and melodies while I was in the plane. The chorus came right away, like an evidence.

The video has been directed by PANAMÆRA, I love it. I show up with my vampire-girlfriends crew, half-thug half-sex, in a weird garden party where everyone drinks this strange red liquid… I’ll let you discover what happens next."

It is the third single from the "Vampire" EP.

==== "Vampire EP" ====
On 8 March 2017, Mai Lan released a new EP, "Vampire", co-written with Max Labarthe and Nick Sylvester. It features the previously released singles, 'Technique', 'Haze', and 'Vampire'. It also features two new tracks, 'Nail Polish' and 'Pas D'Amour'. As written by publication Stereogum, "'Nail Polish' is a ridiculously catchy deadpan electro-house banger, while 'Pas D’Amour' is a torchy, sincere, slow-building song sung entirely in French."

==== "Autopilote" ====
On 19 January 2018, Mai Lan released her second full-length LP "Autopilote", co-written with Max Labarthe (except on the track "Vampire"), Nick Sylvester (except on the tracks "Vampire" and "Blaze Up"), and Anthony Gonzales of M83 (only on the track "Vampire").

The single 'Pumper' was featured in a television ad for Culligan Water during 2018.

=== Collaborations with M83 ===
Mai Lan appeared on four tracks from French electronic music band M83, led by Anthony Gonzalez. The songs are "Bibi the Dog", "Laser Gun", "Atlantique Sud", and the single "Go!", all of them co-written by Mai Lan. This helped her to reach a wider international audience, and she was critically acclaimed for her participation, with Rolling Stone stating:

"It's France's best kept secret, vocalist Mai Lan, who stands tallest; on tracks like "Laser Gun" and "Atlantique Sud" she tempers the record's kitsch factor with the timeless, ghostly vocal sheen."

Mai Lan was part of the Junk worldwide tour in 2016.

=== Other ventures ===
In 2013, Mai Lan created the duo Little Freaky Things in collaboration with musician Donovans (Nicolas Nekmouche), releasing music under the label 11Heads Records. On 2013, they released the EP "Nightfall", reviewed by Billboard as "a proper house tune that looks forward while respecting the roots of its culture". Follow up was the 2014 EP "Saturne", called "a slice of delicately crafted Electro-Pop that recalls the likes of Au Revoir Simone and Annie on the vocal front, and a chilled-out Hudson Mohawke in its sonic textures".

== Discography ==
=== LPs ===
2012: Mai Lan (3ème Bureau / Wagram Music)
2018: Autopilote

1 : Autopilote
2 : Peru
3 : Pumper. In 2019, this song was used in a commercial for Virgin Mobile.
4 : Vampire
5 : Nail polish
6 : Haze
7 : Missile
8 : Dial my number
9 : Blaze up
10 : Clermont
11 : Time to fade
12 : Technique
13 : Pas d'amour

=== Singles ===
2012: "Easy" (3ème Bureau / Wagram Music)
2016: "Technique" (GODMODE)
2016: "Haze" (Cinq7 / Wagram Music)
2017: "Vampire" (Cinq7 / Wagram Music)

=== EPs ===
2012: "Easy (Remixes)" (3ème Bureau / Wagram Music)
2013: "Les Huîtres" (3ème Bureau / Wagram Music)
2017: "Vampire EP" (Cinq7 / Wagram Music)

=== As featured artist ===
==== 2016 ====
- "Hammerhead" by Birdy Nam Nam featuring Mai Lan, from the album Dance or Die.
- "Go!" by M83 featuring Mai Lan, from the album Junk.
- "Bibi the Dog" by M83 featuring Mai Lan, from the album Junk.
- "Laser Gun" by M83 featuring Mai Lan, from the album Junk.
- "Atlantique Sud" by M83 featuring Mai Lan, from the album Junk.
- "Altered Love" by M83 featuring Mai Lan, from the vinyl single Go!.

==== 2015 ====
- "Alastor" by Jabberwocky featuring Mai Lan, from the album Lunar Lane.

==== 2006 ====
- "GPS sur la comète" by La Caution featuring Mai Lan, from the album Des gens revisitent La Caution.
- "Arrêt De Souffle" by Mai Lan, from the soundtrack to the film Sheitan.
- "Gentiment Je T'immole" by Mai Lan, from the soundtrack to the film Sheitan.
- "Serpent" by Nguyen Lê and Mai Lan, from the soundtrack to the film Sheitan.
- "Berceuse" by Nguyen Lê and Mai Lan, from the soundtrack to the film Sheitan.
- "Découverte Maison" by Nguyen Lê and Mai Lan, from the soundtrack to the film Sheitan.

==== 2005 ====
- "Personne fusible" by La Caution featuring Mai Lan, from the album Peines de Maures/Arc-en-ciel pour daltoniens.
