= Hope (Shamir album) =

Studio album by Shamir
- Released: April 17, 2017
- Genre: Indie rock; lo-fi; outsider; country; punk; metal; electropop
- Length: 35:27
- Label: Self-released
- Producer: Shamir

Shamir chronology
Ratchet (2015)	Hope (2017)	Revelations (2017)

Professional ratings
Review scores
Source	Rating
CU Independent	7/10
Pitchfork	6.0/10

Hope is the second studio album by American singer-songwriter Shamir, self-released on SoundCloud on April 17, 2017.

Released with no promotion or label support, the album was recorded over a weekend in which Shamir had considered quitting music.

On April 17, 2022, for the album's fifth anniversary, Shamir released the album on streaming services and Bandcamp, via the Kill Rock Stars label, with a deluxe reissue of the album with two bonus tracks being released on April 7, 2023.

== Track listing ==
Hope tracklisting
No.	Title	Length
1.	"Hope"	3:34
2.	"What Else"	3:23
3.	"Ignore Everything"	3:53
4.	"Tom Kelly"	2:05
5.	"Easier"	4:11
6.	"Like A Bird"	3:25
7.	"One More Time Won't Kill You"	3:42
8.	"I Fucking Hate You"	3:21
9.	"Rain" (Blake Babies cover)	3:48
10.	"Bleed It Out"	4:00

Hope deluxe reissue bonus tracks
No.	Title	Length
11.	"Breathe"	3:54
12.	"Camouflage"	4:08
