= Yaeji (EP) =

EP by Yaeji
- Released: March 31, 2017
- Genre: Lo-fi house
- Length: 19:13
- Label: Godmode
- Producer: Yaeji; Nick Sylvester

Yaeji chronology
Yaeji (2017)	EP2 (2017)

Singles from Yaeji
- 1. "New York 93" Released: February 29, 2016; 2. "Guap" Released: May 13, 2016; 3. "Noonside" Released: February 27, 2017; 4. "Feel It Out" Released: May 12, 2017

Yaeji is the debut extended play by South Korean-American house music producer Kathy Yaeji Lee, known by her stage name as Yaeji. Written and produced by Lee and Nick Sylvester, the EP is a lo-fi house record with minimal structures and spoken word lyrics in a combination of Korean and English. It was released by the label Godmode on March 31, 2017 and garnered mostly favorable reviews from critics, landing at No. 50 on Pitchfork's list of the "50 Best Albums of 2017".

== Production ==
Yaeji was produced by Lee and Nick Sylvester. The making of each song began with Lee writing the lyrics and coming up with concepts on how the instrumental would be produced in Ableton. She then sent her ideas to Sylvester. As he said in an interview, "Maybe I'll replace certain parts or rearrange them, or I'll send it back to her and be like, 'I think this could be better.'" Once the songs' conception was completed, the two went to Godmode's Los Angeles studio to record their final versions. Sylvester initially wrote the instrumental for "Feel It Out" for Beyoncé, but her creative team did not use it and he created a new arrangement of it for Yaeji.

== Composition ==
Yaeji is a lo-fi house album characterized by simple structures, prominent three-note bass riffs, two-note chords and intimate yet deadpan vocals. Lee's singing follows a fast inflection and "shifts between a relaxed whisper and endearing spoken word, maintaining a melancholy register throughout," wrote Kevin Lozano of Pitchfork. Max Pearl of Resident Advisor compared Lee's performance to Marie Davidson and Galcher Lustwerk. The lyrics are written in a combination of both Korean and English languages, with the "secretive or private" stuff being sung in Korean. Yaeji features both emotionally charged songs, "Noonside" being a commentary on the United States Border Patrol and "New York 93" being about her time as a child in New York City, and regular dance tracks such as "Full of It" and a cover of Australian DJ Mall Grab's "Guap." "Feel It Out" is about the idea that "what is here is what ain't" in other places in the world, and Lee raps on the song, "Other countries, they are having more than coffee."

== Promotion ==
"New York 93," its video and a remix of the track by Jean St. Jean were released on February 29, 2016. The track was Yaeji's debut song for Godmode, which included it as part of its weekly Faculty series where the label uploaded a new song from the imprint to SoundCloud each week. As Stereogum summarized, the video "feels like dozens of different memories displaced from time. It’s smooth and sultry, oddly comforting but a bit alienating, in a way that the city it's named after can so often be. Listen below." The track "Noonside" and its music video, which depicts footage of Lee in New York and Seoul, was released on February 27, 2017. On April 4, 2017, The Fader premiered the official music video for "Feel It Out." Filmed at Sylvester's apartment in The Bronx, it depicts Lee in a room with objects such as pineapples coming to life around her.

== Critical reception ==
Professional ratings
Review scores
Source	Rating
Pitchfork	7.1/10
Resident Advisor	4.1/5

XLR8R summarized Yaeji as "a perfect encapsulation of her sound," particularly highlighting the record's "appealing simplicity." Lozano described its more "straightforward" tracks as "earworm[s] through and through," while also noting the use of political and personal songs gave the record "an unexpected emotional texture." Both he and Pearl praised the "pure" and "raw" display of Lee's vocals. Pearl spotlighted the EP's "charming details" in its production, such as the use of vocal harmonies. As Michelle Kim wrote about Yaeji as well as Lee's second extended play, "with each new song, Yaeji sounds more comfortable embracing the binaries that exist within her identity and her music." Gorilla vs. Bear placed the EP in the No. 1 spot in its year-end list of best albums, saying, "Similar to the experience of hearing Grimes for the first time, there's an obvious special, one-of-a-kind quality that just radiates from everything she does".

== Accolades ==
Publication	Accolade	Rank	Ref.
BrooklynVegan	Top 50 Albums of 2017	30	
Gorilla vs. Bear	Albums of 2017	1	
Pitchfork	50 Best Albums of 2017	50	
XLR8R	Best of 2017: Releases	—	

== Track listing ==
Track lengths derived from the iTunes Store.

No.	Title	Length
1.	"Noonside"	3:25
2.	"New York 93"	3:23
3.	"Feel It Out"	3:16
4.	"Guap"	5:40
5.	"Full of It"	3:29
Total length:		19:13

== Release history ==
Region	Date	Format(s)	Label
Worldwide	March 31, 2017	Digital download	Godmode
