= Shamir (album) =

Studio album by Shamir
- Released: October 2, 2020
- Genres: Indie rock; lo-fi; pop; power pop; punk rock
- Length: 27:41
- Label: Self-released
- Producers: Kyle Pulley; Grant Pavol; Matty Beats

Shamir chronology
Cataclysm (2020)	Shamir (2020)	Heterosexuality (2022)

Professional ratings
Aggregate scores
Source	Rating
AnyDecentMusic?	7.3/10
Metacritic	81/100
Review scores
Source	Rating
AllMusic	4/5 stars
Beats Per Minute	70%
Consequence of Sound	B+
DIY	4/5 stars
Dork	4/5 stars
Flood Magazine	7/10
NME	4/5 stars
Pitchfork	7.5/10
Slant Magazine	3.5/5 stars
Under the Radar	8/10

Shamir is the seventh studio album by American singer-songwriter Shamir. The album was self-released by the artist on October 2, 2020.

== Release ==
On June 11, 2020, Shamir released the first single "On My Own". The single is about regaining independence after a break-up, while "peppy drums, a sprightly bassline, and guitar riffs that wouldn’t sound out of place on a Cherry Glazerr LP" are played. "On My Own" was ranked at number 49 of the Top 50 Songs of 2020 by Consequence of Sound.

On July 17, 2020, Shamir announced the release of his new album, along with the second single "I Wonder". Of the single, Shamir explained the meaning:

"The song is about the feeling of love taking over your heart, even when you don’t want it to. It also alludes to climate change and how humans ('love') can be the most toxic thing to the planet ('the heart'), but also the only thing that can fix it."

The third single "Running" was released on August 28, 2020. Shamir said the single is "about a time in my life when I was a part of a toxic friend group where I was the only non-cis person. The song is from the perspective of me now realizing how much it affected my mental health after being a few years removed and realizing how much I was dulling myself down so I did not stick out any more than I already did."

On September 24, 2020, the fourth single "Other Side" was released.

== Composition ==
With Shamir, the singer-songwriter digs into indie rock that also brings in synthesizers and a newfound pop rock and power pop sound. They also work alternative pop hooks into punk rock songs.

Despite these endeavors into heavier sounds, it also shows them returning to pop music, but through an admittedly lo-fi lens.

== Critical reception ==
Shamir was met with "universal acclaim" reviews from critics. At Metacritic, which assigns a weighted average rating out of 100 to reviews from mainstream publications, this release received an average score of 81 based on 8 reviews. AnyDecentMusic?, which collates from magazines, websites and newspapers, gave the release a 7.3 out of 10, based on a critical consensus of 8 reviews.

Heather Phares of AllMusic said: "True to form, Shamir continues to push boundaries as the album comes to a close with the dramatic vocals and strings of "In This Hole." Moments like this make it clear that this album isn't a simple return to pop for Shamir; it's a wide embrace of everything he can do with his music." Writing for Consequence of Sound wrote: "Shamir’s music makes the listener want to wake up. Listening to it is like being shaken awake, blinds thrown open. And it’s not like learning that anything sad or dull or particular was a dream all along; it’s like being made to consider that large-scale, consuming things, things like understanding and religion and love and nationality, have maybe been things worth thinking around and outside of all along." However she noted the "insistent drums, electric guitars, fast paces, and accelerations" on the album. Hannah Mylrea of NME said: "Musically it’s hugely focused, each song short and sharp and coated in precise production, though it’s also split up by a series of short vocal interludes. While they add personality, these can make the album jar a little. Still, this is a jubilant record."

=== Accolades ===
Accolades for Shamir
Publication	Accolade	Rank
Consequence of Sound	Top 50 Albums of 2020	39
Rolling Stone	Top 50 Albums of 2020	29

== Track listing ==
Shamir track listing
No.	Title	Length
1.	"On My Own"	4:11
2.	"Junglepussy Juice"	0:15
3.	"Paranoia"	2:50
4.	"Running"	2:58
5.	"River Is About to Die in This Garage"	0:15
6.	"Other Side"	3:19
7.	"Pretty When I'm Sad"	3:43
8.	"There We Go"	0:14
9.	"Diet"	3:17
10.	"I Wonder"	3:05
11.	"In This Hole"	3:34
Total length:		27:41

== Personnel ==
All credits adapted from the record's Bandcamp page.

Shamir

- Shamir Bailey - vocals, bass, guitar, synth

Additional musicians

- Mike Brenner - lap steel
- Molly Germer - viola, violin, string arrangement
- Danny Murillo - drums
- Kyle Pully - bass, synth

Technical

- Matty Beats - production
- Danny Murillo - production
- Grant Pavol - production
- Kyle Pully - production, mixing
- Zach Hanni - engineering
- Justin Tailor - mixing
- Ryan Schwabe - mastering
