= Ratchet (album) =

Studio album by Shamir
- Released: May 19, 2015
- Genres: Electronic; dance-pop; R&B; electropop; disco
- Length: 41:48
- Label: XL
- Producer: Nick Sylvester

Shamir chronology
Northtown (2014)	Ratchet (2015)	Hope (2017)

Singles from Ratchet
- 1. "On the Regular" Released: October 28, 2014; 2. "Call It Off" Released: March 23, 2015; 3. "Darker" Released: May 5, 2015; 4. "In for the Kill" Released: September 15, 2015

Professional ratings
Aggregate scores
Source	Rating
AnyDecentMusic?	7.5/10
Metacritic	80/100
Review scores
Source	Rating
AllMusic	4/5 stars
Chicago Tribune	3.5/4 stars
The Irish Times	4/5 stars
Mojo	4/5 stars
NME	8/10
Pitchfork	8.3/10
Q	4/5 stars
Rolling Stone	3/5 stars
Spin	9/10
Vice	A−

Ratchet is the 2015 debut studio album by American singer/songwriter Shamir, released on May 19, 2015, on XL Recordings.

The debut single from the album, "Call It Off", was released in March 2015 while the album itself was released on May 19, 2015. The music video for "Call It Off" was produced and released as part of the 2015 YouTube Music Awards.

The album's second single, "Darker", was released in May 2015. The single was released ahead of the album and was promoted as part of the album's release compaign.

"On the Regular" is also included on the album. The track had previously been released as a single before its inclusion on the album.

== Accolades ==
Publication	Accolade	Year	Rank
NME	NME'S Albums of the Year 2015	2015	21
Pitchfork	The 50 Best Albums of 2015	2015	48
Rolling Stone	The 20 Best Pop Albums of 2015	2015	19
Stereogum	The 50 Best Albums of 2015	2015	21
Spin	The 50 Best Albums of 2015	2015	9

== Track listing ==
1. Vegas (4:16)
2. Make A Scene (2:52)
3. On The Regular (2:58)
4. Call It Off (2:50)
5. Hot Mess (4:29)
6. Demon (3:40)
7. In For The Kill (3:18)
8. Youth (4:38)
9. Darker (3:58)
10. Head In The Clouds (5:02)
11. KC (Bonus) (3:47)

== Writing and composition ==
The first single, 'Call It Off', describes a toxic relationship between the writer and an unknown person. The song is outlined by 'acid' basslines and rises up to hectic synth lines.
