= With a Hammer =

Studio album by Yaeji
- Released: April 7, 2023
- Length: 43:39
- Languages: English; Korean
- Label: XL
- Producers: Enayet; Loraine James; K Wata; Yaeji

Yaeji chronology
What We Drew 우리가 그려왔던 (2020)	With a Hammer (2023)

Singles from With a Hammer
- 1. "For Granted" Released: January 17, 2023; 2. "Done (Let's Get It)" Released: February 23, 2023; 3. "Passed Me By" Released: April 4, 2023

With a Hammer is the debut studio album by American musician Yaeji. It was released on April 7, 2023, through XL Recordings.

== Reception ==
Professional ratings
Aggregate scores
Source	Rating
AnyDecentMusic?	8.0/10
Metacritic	86/100
Review scores
Source	Rating
AllMusic	4/5 stars
Clash	8/10
DIY	5/5 stars
Exclaim!	8/10
The Line of Best Fit	8/10
NME	4/5 stars
The Observer	4/5 stars
Pitchfork	8.5/10
The Skinny	4/5 stars
Slant Magazine	4/5 stars

With a Hammer received a score of 86 out of 100 on review aggregator Metacritic based on 13 critics' reviews, indicating "universal acclaim". Pitchfork gave the album their "Best New Music" distinction, with Julianna Escobedo Shepherd describing it as "an airy blend of synth-pop, jazz, techno, and ambient. It's a generous, understated exploration of rage as a source of creative renewal".

== Track listing ==
All lyrics are written by Kathy Yaeji Lee; "1 Thing to Smash" lyrics co-written by Loraine James.

With a Hammer track listing
No.	Title	Music	Length
1.	"Submerge FM"	Chris Botta; Gabrielle Gabro	3:25
2.	"For Granted"	Lee	2:41
3.	"Fever"	Lee	4:08
4.	"Passed Me By"	Lee	4:03
5.	"With a Hammer"	Lee; Botta	3:45
6.	"I'll Remember for Me, I'll Remember for You"	Lee	2:02
7.	"Done (Let's Get It)"	Lee	2:52
8.	"Ready or Not" (with K Wata)	Lee; Kenzo Perron	4:31
9.	"Michin" (with Enayet)	Lee; Enayet Kabir	3:33
10.	"Away x5"	Lee	2:33
11.	"Happy" (with Nourished by Time)	Lee; Marcus Elliot Brown	3:59
12.	"1 Thing to Smash" (with Loraine James)	Lee; Loraine James	3:15
13.	"Be Alone in This"	Lee; Botta; Kabir	2:45
Total length:			43:39

== Personnel ==
- Yaeji – vocals, production, engineering (all tracks), programming (1–3, 5–8, 10, 13), creative direction, cover art, design, illustrations
- Joe LaPorta – mastering
- Chris Botta – mixing, engineering (all tracks), arrangement (13)
- K Wata – production, engineering, programming, arrangement (8)
- Enayet – engineering (9, 13); production, arrangement (9)
- Loraine James – production, programming, arrangement (12)

== Charts ==
Chart performance for With a Hammer
Chart (2023)	Peak position
US World Albums (Billboard)	13
