= Trash Hit =

TrashHit

Studio album by Mr. Dream
- Released: March 1, 2011
- Genre: post-punk, indie rock
- Label: Godmode Records

Singles from Trash Hit
- 1. "Scarred for Life"; 2. "Crime"; 3. "Learn the Language"

Trash Hit is the debut studio album by American post-punk band Mr. Dream, released on March 1, 2011, by Godmode Records.

== Track listing ==
All music is composed by Mr. Dream.

No.	Title	Length
1.	"Trash Hit"	3:11
2.	"Crime"	2:04
3.	"Scarred For Life"	2:14
4.	"Holy Name"	2:12
5.	"Shotgun Tricks"	2:39
6.	"Walter"	2:29
7.	"Unfinished Business"	4:10
8.	"Cool Down Apollo"	1:36
9.	"Winners"	2:55
10.	"Knick Knack"	2:19
11.	"Croquet"	2:26
12.	"King Klutz"	1:41
13.	"Learn the Language"	3:16
Total length:		33:12

Professional ratings
Aggregate scores
Source	Rating
Metacritic	(79/100)
Review scores
Source	Rating
Pitchfork	7.5/10 stars
Consequence of Sound	4/5 stars
Rolling Stone	3.5/5 stars

== Personnel ==
- Adam Moerder – Songwriter, guitarist, vocals
- Matt Morello – Vocals, bass guitar
- Nick Sylvester – Songwriter, drums, producer
