= Shamir (musician) =

American singer and songwriter (born 1994)

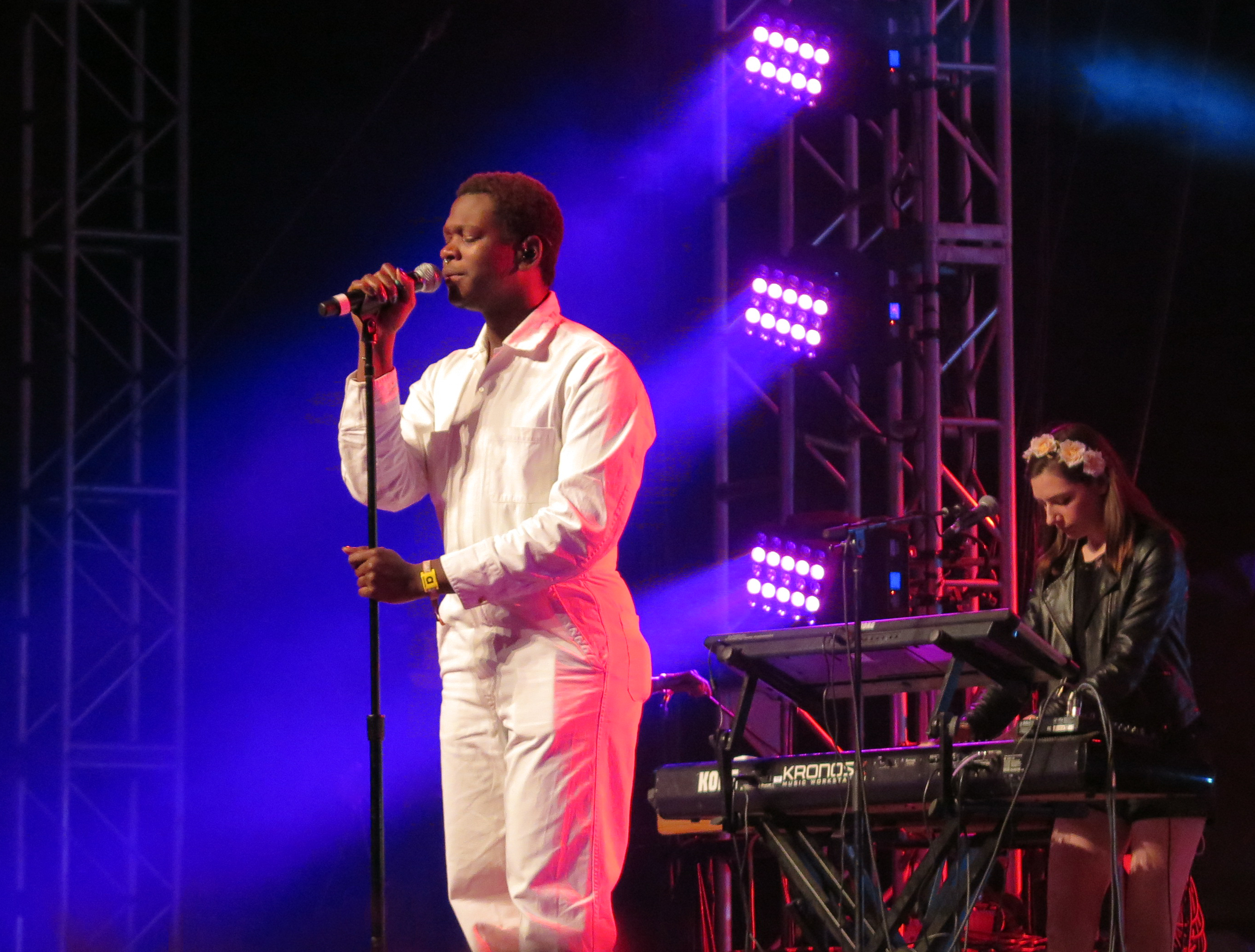

Background information
- Born: Shamir Bailey; November 7, 1994 (age 32)
- Origin: Las Vegas, Nevada, U.S.
- Genres: Hip house; dance-pop; indie pop; disco; electropop; indie rock; lo-fi; punk rock
- Occupations: Singer, songwriter
- Instruments: Vocals, guitar, synthesizer, drums
- Years active: 2014–present
- Labels: Little L; Godmode; XL; Father/Daughter; AntiFragile

Shamir Bailey (born November 7, 1994) is an American singer and songwriter from Las Vegas, Nevada. His debut extended play (EP), Northtown, was released in June 2014 to positive reviews. In October 2014, he signed to XL Recordings and released the single "On the Regular". His debut LP Ratchet was released on May 19, 2015 in the United States. Since then he has released seven independent studio albums, Hope (2017), Revelations (2017), Resolution (2018), Be the Yee, Here Comes the Haw (2019), Cataclysm (2019), Shamir (2020), and Heterosexuality (2022).

== Early life ==
Shamir grew up in North Las Vegas, an area that he has called "cookie-cutter suburban". He was raised as a Muslim but describes himself as "more spiritual than religious, I don't believe in god per se, I kind of feel like god is the universe." Shamir is non-binary, informing an interviewer in 2015 that "I don't identify as gay because I don't identify as male or female". Although he does not have a preferred pronoun, he is comfortable with male pronouns, and "never really got" singular they.

His aunt was in the music business and lived with Shamir and his mother. Bass players and producers were guests at the family's home, helping his aunt with her songs. His parents and aunt introduced him to a wide range of music, including hip-hop, R&B, Outkast, Groove Theory, and singers like Billie Holiday, Nina Simone and Janis Joplin. At age nine, Shamir received an Epiphone guitar, and began writing music.

At age 16, he formed a punk band with a friend, but the band ended quickly when his partner froze on stage at their first gig. During his high school years, he recorded tracks for his first EP. Shortly after graduating from high school, he sent a demo tape to the Godmode label in New York City. The label founder Nick Sylvester signed him to the label.

== Music career ==
Shamir's debut EP, Northtown, was released by Godmode in June 2014 and is named for the Northtown neighborhood where he grew up. Jules Muir, writing for the music blog Pigeons & Planes noted that Shamir "continues to make a bigger name for himself with every new release and a unique new sound on each". Jamieson Cox of Pitchfork called the EP's opening track, "If It Wasn't True" "a stunning opening salvo, one that plays on the tension between Shamir's slender vocal and lyrical naiveté and grimy, threatening instrumental tones before devolving into a chaotic mess, swallowed by a haphazardly firing synth corroding in real-time". In July 2014, Flavorwire named Shamir's "If It Wasn't True" one of its "25 Best Songs of 2014 So Far". Radio.com also included Shamir in its "New Music To Know: Best of 2014, So Far" profile, noting that "Shamir combines the honest songwriting of Taylor Swift with the theatrics of Lana Del Rey to make something that sounds far wiser than his 19 years."

After signing to XL Recordings, he released the single "On the Regular" in October 2014 which went on to be used in a 2015 Android Wear commercial. In March 2015, he released "Call It Off" as a single in the debut album, Ratchet, released on May 19, 2015. The accompanied music video was made and released as part of the 2015 YouTube Music Awards. "Darker" was the second single from Ratchet; the song was released in May 2015. In 2015, he toured with Years & Years, opening for their UK dates. In mid-March 2016, he served as the opening act for Troye Sivan's Blue Neighbourhood Tour. On April 17, 2017, Shamir released his second album, Hope. He revealed he was dropped from XL Recordings and self-released the album.

After Hope was released, Shamir broke with his management team and again considered quitting his music career. After a psychotic episode, he spent time in a psychiatric hospital, where he was diagnosed with bipolar disorder. He returned to Las Vegas, where he wrote and recorded most of his third album, Revelations, in two weeks. Noting that the style of the album differed significantly from his previous work, he told a journalist: "A lot of people think I'm crazy. I guess I kind of am. But I also know what's best for me, and that's more important than fame and money".

Shamir was featured on Wussy Magazine's "Sex Issue" in 2018. On March 9, 2018, Shamir released his fourth album, Resolution without any prior announcement. Resolution marks a continuation of Shamir's indie rock style, similar to Hope and Revelations.

In January 2020, Shamir contributed to a benefit compilation in support of Bernie Sanders's 2020 presidential run. Organized by indie rock band Strange Ranger, the compilation was titled "Bernie Speaks With the Community".

In 2020, Shamir released the self-titled full-length album, Shamir. It was co-produced by Kyle Pulley, and many of the songs, including the single "On My Own" were recorded at Headroom Studios in Philadelphia. The album was met with critical acclaim and made year end lists for Rolling Stone, Pitchfork and NPR Music.

Shamir published his first book, But I'm a Painter, with Bottlecap Press in 2021, a collection of essays about paintings he created over the previous six years.

== Musical style ==
Shamir is known for having an androgynous countertenor voice. Radio.com wrote that Shamir's singing voice, "like Joplin's, stops you in your tracks". He does not mind having his voice described as androgynous, but notes that "countertenor" is the correct term: "It's not feminine, it's not masculine. It's a happy medium ... I feel like if the world was more like that, our problems would be gone."

Critic Jamieson Cox, writing for Pitchfork Media, wrote:

With a piercing countertenor somewhere between Prince masquerading as Camille and the cracking adolescent soul of the teenage Michael Jackson, the 19-year-old North Las Vegas native dismantles the expectations maintained for vocalists based on their gender, demanding instead that the focus be placed on their agile, fluttering performance.

Lizzie Plaugic of CMJ called Shamir's music "amazingly unclassifiable", like a "souped-up Vegas Strip disco with a self-conscious pop bent", and wrote that his voice "limbers and stretches like a wad of pink Silly Putty dipped in glitter". In a 2020 Vulture interview, Shamir cited Taylor Swift as an inspiration and influence on his songwriting.

== Discography ==
Shamir discography
- Studio albums: 10
- EPs: 5
- Singles: 20

=== Studio albums ===
Title	Details	Peak chart positions		
Title	Details	US Dance	US Heat	US Indie
Ratchet	Released: May 19, 2015; Label: XL; Formats: CD, LP, digital download, streaming	6	7	22
Hope	Released: April 17, 2017; Label: Self-released; Formats: LP, streaming	—	—	—
Revelations	Released: November 3, 2017; Label: Father/Daughter; Formats: CD, cassette, digital download, streaming	—	—	—
Resolution	Released: August 31, 2018; Label: Self-released; Formats: LP, digital download, streaming	—	—	—
Be the Yee, Here Comes the Haw	Released: April 19, 2019; Label: Self-released; Formats: Digital download, streaming	—	—	—
Cataclysm	Released: March 18, 2020; Label: Self-released; Formats: Cassette, digital download, streaming	—	—	—
Shamir	Released: October 2, 2020; Label: Self-released; Formats: LP, cassette, digital download, streaming	—	—	—
Heterosexuality	Released: February 11, 2022; Label: AntiFragile; Formats: LP, digital download, streaming	—	—	—
Homo Anxietatem	Released: August 18, 2023; Label: Kill Rock Stars; Formats: LP, CD, digital download, streaming	—	—	—
Ten	Released: May 16, 2025; Label: Kill Rock Stars; Formats: LP, CD, digital download, streaming	—	—	—

=== Extended plays ===
Title	Details
Bitter	Released: January 31, 2014; Label: Little L; Formats: Digital download
Northtown	Released: June 6, 2014; Label: Godmode; Formats: Vinyl, Digital download
Shamir on Audiotree Live	Released: December 20, 2017; Label: Audiotree Music; Formats: Digital download, streaming
Room	Released: March 9, 2018; Label: Father/Daughter; Formats: 7-inch vinyl, digital download, streaming
Jam in the Van - Shamir (Live Session)	Released: March 10, 2018; Label: Self-released; Formats: Digital download, streaming

=== Singles ===
Title	Year	Album
"On the Regular"	2015	Ratchet
"Darker"	2015	Ratchet
"On My Own"	2020	Shamir
"I Wonder"	2020	Shamir
"Running"	2020	Shamir
"Other Side"	2020	Shamir
"Ocean Eyes"	2021	Non-album single
"Punk Rock Boyfriend" (with Macy Rodman)	2021	Unbelievable Animals
"Where Gravity is Dead"	2021	Stars Rock Kill (Rock Stars)
"Gay Agenda"	2021	Heterosexuality
"Cisgender"	2021	Heterosexuality
"Reproductive"	2022	Heterosexuality
"Caught Up"	2022	Heterosexuality
"Breathe"	2022	Hope (Deluxe Reissue)
"Oversized Sweater"	2023	Homo Anxietatem
"Crime"	2023	Homo Anxietatem
"Our Song"	2023	Homo Anxietatem
"The Beginning"	2023	Homo Anxietatem
"Neverwannago"	2025	Ten
"Recording 291"	2025	Ten

=== Guest appearances ===
Release	Year	Other artist(s)	Credits	Album
"Punx with Ukeleles"	2019	Fashion Brigade	Featured artist/co-writer	Fvck the Heartache
"Shout"	2018	House of Feelings	Featured artist/co-writer	New Lows
"Tantrum"	2017	Michete	Featured artist/co-writer	Cool Tricks 3 (EP)
"Tunnel Vision"	2017	Rina Sawayama	Featured artist/co-writer	Rina (EP)
"Like O, Like H"	2017	Tegan and Sara	Cover performer	Tegan and Sara present The Con X: Covers
"Falling"	2017	House of Feelings	Featured artist/co-writer	Last Chance (EP)

=== Other album appearances ===
Song	Year	Other artist(s)	Album
"Burn with Me"	2020	—N/a	Bernie Speaks with the Community
	2026	Big Benny Bailey	Business Spice

== Filmography ==
- Dear White People - AJ (2017)
- Tuca & Bertie - multiple voices (2019)

== Tours ==
Opening act

- Marina and the Diamonds – Neon Nature Tour (2015)
- Troye Sivan - Blue Neighbourhood Tour (2016) (Washington D.C., Atlanta, Orlando, Miami, Dallas and Houston shows)
