= Bubblegum (mixtape) =

Mixtape by Biig Piig
- Released: 20 January 2023
- Genre: Alternative pop
- Length: 17:58
- Label: RCA

Biig Piig chronology
The Sky Is Bleeding (2021)	Bubblegum (2023)	11:11 (2025)

Singles from Bubblegum
- 1. "Kerosene" Released: 6 September 2022; 2. "This Is What They Meant" Released: 20 October 2022; 3. "Picking Up" Released: 8 December 2022

Bubblegum is the debut mixtape by Irish singer and rapper Biig Piig. It was released on 20 January 2023 through RCA Records.

== Background and release ==
On 6 September 2022, Biig Piig released "Kerosene". The song debuted as BBC Radio 1's Hottest Record, with her describing it as a "hot girl summer anthem". She noted that it was part of a "wider project", but had not yet announced anything. On 20 October, she released a second single, "This Is What They Meant", and announced Bubblegum and its scheduled release date of 20 January 2023. "This Is What They Meant" received a music video on 17 November. The third and final single, "Picking Up", is a collaboration with Deb Never and was released on 8 December. It also received a music video, which was published on 12 January 2023.

== Critical reception ==
Bubblegum was released to positive reception. Tara Joshi for The Guardian rated it 4/5 and called the production "immaculate". Hannah Mylrea for NME and Ben Tipple for DIY Magazine also awarded 4/5 ratings. James Mellen for Clash thought it was the most "creative, well-thought-out and simply fun" release from the United Kingdom's alternative pop scene recently and awarded it a 7/10. Jem Aswad for Variety praised the mixtape, and claimed Biig Piig's "biggest moment is yet to come".

== Track listing ==
No.	Title	Length
1.	"Only One"	2:30
2.	"Liquorice"	2:36
3.	"Kerosene"	2:29
4.	"This Is What They Meant"	2:54
5.	"Ghosting"	2:15
6.	"Picking Up" (featuring Deb Never)	2:55
7.	"In the Dark"	2:19
Total length:		17:58
