= What We Drew =

Mixtape by Yaeji
- Released: April 2, 2020
- Length: 38:31
- Language: English; Korean
- Label: XL
- Producer: Yaeji

Yaeji chronology
EP2 (2017)	What We Drew (2020)	With a Hammer (2023)

Singles from What We Drew 우리가 그려왔던
- 1. "Waking Up Down" Released: March 10, 2020; 2. "What We Drew 우리가 그려왔던" Released: March 31, 2020

Professional ratings
Aggregate scores
Source	Rating
Metacritic	84/100
Review scores
Source	Rating
AllMusic	4/5 stars
Beats Per Minute	80%
Exclaim!	9/10
The Guardian	4/5 stars
Loud and Quiet	8/10
NME	4/5 stars
The Observer	4/5 stars
Pitchfork	8.0/10
Q	4/5 stars

What We Drew (Korean: 우리가 그려왔던) is the debut mixtape by American musician Yaeji. It was released on April 2, 2020, through XL Recordings.

== Track listing ==
What We Drew track listing
No.	Title	Length
1.	"My Imagination 상상"	2:20
2.	"What We Drew 우리가 그려왔던"	3:49
3.	"In Place 그자리 그대로"	2:20
4.	"When I Grow Up"	2:42
5.	"Money Can't Buy" (with Nappy Nina)	2:50
6.	"Free Interlude" (with Lil Fayo, trenchcoat and Sweet Pea)	2:21
7.	"Spell 주문" (with YonYon and G.L.A.M.)	3:06
8.	"Waking Up Down"	3:21
9.	"In the Mirror 거울"	4:32
10.	"The Th1ng" (with Victoria Sin and Shy One)	4:12
11.	"These Days 요즘"	2:59
12.	"Never Settling Down"	3:59
Total length:		38:31

Bonus track
No.	Title	Length
13.	"When in Summer, I Forget About the Winter"	3:17
Total length:		41:48

== Charts ==
Chart performance for What We Drew
Chart (2020)	Peak position
UK Breakers Albums (OCC)	15
US World Albums (Billboard)	12
