= 11:11 (Biig Piig album) =

Studio album by Biig Piig
- Released: 7 February 2025
- Length: 29:11
- Label: Sony Music

Biig Piig chronology
Bubblegum (2023)	11:11 (2025)

Singles from 11:11
- 1. "4AM" Released: 27 September 2024; 2. "Decimal" Released: 11 October 2024; 3. "Favourite Girl" Released: 23 October 2024; 4. "Ponytail" Released: 13 December 2024; 5. "One Way Ticket" Released: 14 January 2025

11:11 is the debut studio album by Irish singer and rapper Biig Piig. It was released by Sony Music on 7 February 2025 and received favorable reviews.

== Background and release ==
Leading up to the release of 11:11, Biig Piig released three singles: "4AM" on 27 September 2024, "Decimal" on 11 October 2024, and "Favourite Girl" on 23 October 2024. Alongside the release of "Favourite Girl", she announced the title of the album.

11:11 was released through Sony Music on 7 February 2025. It is Biig Piig's debut album, and follows her debut mixtape Bubblegum (2023).

== Critical reception ==
Professional ratings
Aggregate scores
Source	Rating
Metacritic	75/100
Review scores
Source	Rating
Beats Per Minute	72%
Clash	7/10
DIY	4.5/5 stars
The Observer	3/5 stars
The Skinny	3/5 stars

According to the review aggregator Metacritic, 11:11 received "generally favorable reviews" based on a weighted average score of 75 out of 100 from 6 critic scores. It received positive reviews from DIY, Clash, and Beats Per Minute, and mixed reviews from The Skinny and The Observer.

== Track listing ==
11:11 track listing
No.	Title	Length
1.	"4AM"	2:58
2.	"Ponytail"	4:03
3.	"Cynical"	2:33
4.	"Favourite Girl"	2:39
5.	"I Keep Losing Sleep"	1:19
6.	"9-5"	2:35
7.	"Decimal"	2:32
8.	"Silhouette"	2:11
9.	"Stay Home"	2:44
10.	"One Way Ticket"	2:47
11.	"Brighter Day"	2:50
Total length:		29:11

== Charts ==
Chart performance for 11:11
Chart (2025)	Peak position
UK Album Downloads (Official Charts)	75
