= Mr. Dream =

American punk rock music band

- Origin: Brooklyn, New York, U.S.
- Genres: punk rock, rock music
- Years active: 2008–2014
- Label: Godmode Records
- Members: Adam Moerder; Matt Morello; Nick Sylvester
- Website: mrdreamland.us/

Mr. Dream was an American punk rock music group. They released their debut album, Trash Hit, on March 1, 2011. They released The Ultimate in Luxury as a "posthumous LP" on July 7, 2014, shortly after their breakup.

== History ==
Based in Brooklyn, New York, Mr. Dream was composed of Adam Moerder (vocals, guitarist), Matt Morello (vocals, bass guitarist) and Nick Sylvester (drums, producer). Moerder has written several pieces for various publications, including The New Yorker and Pitchfork. Sylvester was a writer at the Village Voice and Pitchfork.

Moerder and Sylvester originally met while writing for the Harvard Lampoon. Several years after graduating from college, Moerder, Sylvester and Morello had relocated to Brooklyn and started practicing and writing together as Mr. Dream. After self funding and utilizing the generosity of friends, the band started fund raising on Kickstarter. Raising over $3,000 from supporters, the band produced Mr. Dream Goes to Jail, a four-song EP. Supporters received a vinyl copy of the EP.

The band performed with several different bands throughout the New York City area. Notably, Sleigh Bells, M.I.A. at Coco 66 in May 2010. For promotion of Trash Hit, they opened for CSS and Sleigh Bells in Washington DC, Philadelphia, New York City, and Boston, which marked the first time the band performed outside of New York City. The band also opened for Archers of Loaf in New York in June 2011.

=== The Ultimate in Luxury (2014) ===
On October 23, 2013, Mr. Dream announced a new full-length album, The Ultimate in Luxury. In a nod to Moerder and Sylvester's journalistic roots, the release date is scheduled for "TK". The first single released from the album was "Fringy Slider" which was described as having a sound similar to "an early Franz Ferdinand track."

The Ultimate in Luxury was reviewed favorably, being called "slimy and sweet" and a "glamorously sardonic eulogy." The album was made available for streaming on SoundCloud, and for sale as a cassette on the Godmode Records website. The cassette also shipped with an option for an essay from one of the band's two writers, Moerder or Sylvester.

== Critical reception ==
Critical reception was largely favorable, with Stereogum listing them as one of their top 40 new bands of 2010 "because they write smart, ballsy songs." The Fader praised them as "an antidote to the pulseless navel-gazing of certain lo-fi softies of late" and also noted that they don't "suck," despite their music critic background. Fluxblog's Matthew Perpetua also overcame his music critic fears and noted that the band created "brainy yet very physical rock music that is always desirable but generally scarce". Mr. Dream was compared to Franz Ferdinand,The Jesus Lizard, Pixies, Hüsker Dü and The Wipers.

== Discography ==
=== Albums ===
- The Ultimate in Luxury (2014)
- Fatherland (2012)
- Trash Hit (2011)
- No Girls Allowed (EP) (2010)
- Mr. Dream Goes to Jail (EP) (2009)

=== Demos ===
- Criminal Record (2010)

=== Singles ===
- "Fringy Slider" (October 2013)
- "What a Mess" (January 2012)
- "The Room" (January 2012)
- "Knuckle Sandwich" (February 2010)
- "Scarred for Life" (July 2010)
- "Learn the Language" (October 2010)
- "Crime" (January 2011)
- "Moneybags" (August 2011)
