= Revelations (Shamir album) =

Studio album by Shamir
- Released: November 3, 2017
- Recorded: May 2017
- Genre: Indie pop; lo-fi
- Length: 31:38
- Label: Father/Daughter Records
- Producer: Shamir

Shamir chronology
Hope (2017)	Revelations (2017)	Resolution (2018)

Professional ratings
Aggregate scores
Source	Rating
AnyDecentMusic?	6.5/10
Metacritic	70/100
Review scores
Source	Rating
AllMusic	3.5/5 stars
The A.V. Club	B
Consequence of Sound	B−
The Guardian	4/5 stars
New Musical Express	3/5 stars
Pitchfork	5.9/10

Revelations is the third studio album by American singer-songwriter Shamir, released on Father/Daughter Records on November 3, 2017. The album was recorded in May 2017 in his hometown of Las Vegas.

== Track listing ==
All tracks written by Shamir Bailey, except "90's Kids", written by Shamir Bailey & Theresa Harris.

1. "Games"
2. "You Have A Song"
3. "90's Kids"
4. "Her Story"
5. "Blooming"
6. "Cloudy"
7. "Float"
8. "Astral Plane"
9. "Straight Boy"
