= Northtown Mall =

Northtown Mall may refer to:

- North Town Centre, formerly North Town Mall, Edmonton, Alberta, Canada
- Northtown Mall (Blaine, Minnesota), U.S.
- North Towne Square Mall, now Lakeside Centre, in Toledo, Ohio, U.S.
- NorthTown Mall (Spokane, Washington), U.S.
