= Live to Survive =

Single by MØ

from the album Motordrome
- Released: 28 May 2021
- Genre: Synth-pop
- Length: 3:04
- Label: Sony UK
- Songwriters: Karen Marie Ørsted; Caroline Ailin; Sylvester Sivertsen; Samuel George Lewis
- Producer: SG Lewis

MØ singles chronology
"On & On" (2019)	"Live to Survive" (2021)	"Kindness" (2021)

Music video
- "Live to Survive" on YouTube

"Live to Survive" is a song by Danish singer and songwriter MØ. It was released on 28 May 2021 as the lead single from third second studio album, Motordrome (2021). It was written by MØ, Caroline Ailin, Sylvester Sivertsen and SG Lewis.

== Background ==
MØ hadn't released new music since dropping "On & On" in 2019 as part of Walshy Fire Presents: MMMMØ - The Mix. In early May 2021, she shared a teaser on Instagram featuring the lyrics, "I live to survive / Another heartache / I live to survive / Another mistake", which was later confirmed on May 10 to be a preview of her new single "Live to Survive", arriving later that month. Taking to social media to make the announcement, MØ revealed that the track would be released on Thursday, May 27, and provided fans with a pre-save link that offered a sneak peek of "something special". Fans who pre-saved the song were able to view behind-the-scenes footage from the "Live to Survive" music video, including a scene of MØ being strapped with equipment around her leg as she prepared to get into a river.

[It's] very much about pulling yourself through a shitty time and coming back stronger on the other side. But it's also about forgiving yourself for those mistakes. It's going to happen a few times in your life, so you need to get back on the horse.

It was written during the COVID-19 lockdown with Caroline Ailin and Sly, and produced by SG Lewis. In a statement, MØ explained that the song is about "pulling yourself back up after the crash of a toxic relationship to someone or something". She added that it serves as a reminder that "life is a constant dance of ups and downs, and that the downs are OK", emphasizing resilience and the ability to rebuild. She further noted that the song is also about forgiving oneself for mistakes, acknowledging that setbacks are inevitable and emphasizing the importance of moving forward each time they occur.

== Composition ==
The track is synth-driven and lyrically centers on overcoming heartbreak. MØ expresses self-empowerment and recovery with lines such as, "You thought you were out of my league/ I'm out of your league, I'm out of your league/ Watch me, I'm back on my feet." Clash described the song as MØ's first statement since Forever Neverland, characterizing it as the opening of a fresh chapter in her career.

== Music video ==
The release of "Live to Survive" was accompanied by a music video directed by Joanna Nordahl. The video was shot in the British countryside and debuted alongside the single.

== Critical reception ==
Gigwise wrote that the chorus of "Live to Survive" is "trademark MØ synth-pop", while also noting that some parts would not sound out of place on a Miley Cyrus record post-2019.

== Charts ==
Chart performance for "Live to Survive"
Chart (2021)	Peak position
Denmark Airplay (Hitlisten)	1

== Certifications ==
Certifications for "Live to Survive"
Region	Certification	Certified units/sales
Denmark (IFPI Danmark)	Gold	45,000^{‡}
^{‡} Sales+streaming figures based on certification alone.
