= Motordrome (album) =

Studio album by MØ
- Released: 28 January 2022
- Genre: Pop
- Length: 32:15
- Label: Sony UK
- Producer: Ariel Rechtshaid; Ronni Vindahl; Jakob Littauer; Jam City; Lotus IV; SG Lewis; Sly; Stint

MØ chronology
Forever Neverland (2018)	Motordrome (2022)	Plæygirl (2025)

Singles from Motordrome
- 1. "Live to Survive" Released: 28 May 2021; 2. "Kindness" Released: 30 July 2021; 3. "Brad Pitt" Released: 12 November 2021; 4. "Goosebumps" Released: 12 November 2021; 5. "New Moon" Released: 28 January 2022

Motordrome is the third studio album by Danish singer and songwriter MØ, released on 28 January 2022 through Sony Music UK, three years after her album Forever Neverland (2018). It was announced alongside the release of the singles "Brad Pitt" and "Goosebumps" on 12 November 2021, and also includes the singles "Live to Survive" and "Kindness". MØ embarked on a tour in Europe and North America from February 2022 in support of the album.

Motordrome received generally favorable reviews from critics, with a Metacritic score of 68 based on 10 reviews. While some reviewers praised its inventive direction and energetic production, others felt it lacked consistency. The album charted at number nine in Denmark.

== Background ==
MØ began work on Motordrome to help herself "out of a downward spiral – out of the motor d[r]ome of her own head". She characterised the album as being "about both the sadness and the joy of making changes in your life" and stated that she hopes Motordrome feels "genuine" to listeners in the sense that "there are stories there that they can connect with". She also expressed that the album "represents a huge change in my life. Even though I'm still doing what I love doing, it does feel like a new chapter. That is scary, but it's freeing."

Motordrome, the follow-up to 2018's Forever Neverland, is due for release on 28 January and will feature previously-released tracks "Live to Survive" and "Kindness". The record includes contributions from Caroline Ailin, Ariel Rechtshaid, Jam City, SG Lewis, Linus Wiklund, and Yangze. MØ stated, "I hope that people will feel that it's genuine and that there are stories there that they can connect with. For me this album represents a huge change in my life. Even though I'm still doing what I love doing, it does feel like a new chapter. An era of my life is over and I'm entering a new one. That is scary, but it's freeing". Ahead of the album's release, MØ shared new material, highlighting tracks such as "Brad Pitt" and "Goosebumps".

== Composition ==
The Independent noted that MØ herself described the album's sound as "dark disco", combining her formative punk influences with the pop sensibilities she has been known for since "Lean On", resulting in a moody blend of electropop and indie rock.

== Singles ==
"Live to Survive" was issued as the first single on 28 May 2021, followed two months later by second single "Kindness" on 30 July. The official album announcement on 12 November 2021 was accompanied by the double singles "Brad Pitt" and "Goosebumps". On 28 January 2022, the fifth single "New Moon" was released, alongside the album. The sixth single, "True Romance", was released on 17 June, as album's The Dødsdrom Edition. Two months later, "Spaceman" was released as the album's seventh and final single from The Dødsdrom Edition on 12 August.

== Critical reception ==
Motordrome ratings
Aggregate scores
Source	Rating
AnyDecentMusic?	6.9/10
Metacritic	68/100
Review scores
Source	Rating
Clash	7/10
DIY	4/5 stars
Dork	4/5
Gigwise	8/10 stars
The Independent	3/5 stars
The Line of Best Fit	9/10
NME	3/5 stars
Pitchfork	6.2/10
The Skinny	4/5 stars
Slant Magazine	2.5/5 stars

Motordrome has received generally favourable reviews from music critics. At Metacritic, which assigns a normalised rating out of 100 to reviews from mainstream critics, the album has an average score of 68 based on ten reviews.

Writing for Slant Magazine, Charles Lyons-Burt gave the album rating 2.5 out of 5 stars and wrote, "When Ørsted ramps up the bombast, Motordrome reaches a serviceable level of pop pageantry. But most of the singer's cooed melodies feel comparatively half-hearted. Ultimately, the album has a way of getting your attention and failing to keep it." In a positive review Gigwise's Adam England stated that "MØ sound might have evolved to incorporate both her previous material and her teenage tastes, but this could be her best album yet. It's algorithm, baby." El Hunt from NME stated "The record doesn't always hit the mark" and add that "The immensely memorable hooks on show certainly help, too – but after Motordrome's fizzled out, you're left wishing the engines revved a little louder." The Independent's Helen Brown opined that "Tracks have enough energy to keep limbs twitching, but not enough force to pull bystanders from the walls." Writing for Clash, Robin Murray felt that "Motordrome utilises its 10 track span to broach a number of fresh ideas; spinning the dial once more, MØ is able to conjure something fresh, taking risks that few peers would attempt". Writing for The Line of Best Fit, John Amen lauded the album, concluding that "Motordrome is a multifaceted delight and an early contender for pop album of the year." The Skinny praised Motordrome for its exploration of new emotional depths, noting MØ's distinctive blend of cool and collected electro-pop.

== Tour ==
MØ made the first announcement of her Motordrome World Tour Chapter One tour dates on 12 November 2021, and ticket sales were available from 17 November 2021. The tour covered Europe and North America. However, on 17 December on social media, she wrote that concert dates in Europe had been postponed from February to May due to coronavirus restrictions. In March, the singer performed with Imagine Dragons as a support act on their North American tour Mercury World Tour. The tour began on 26 February 2022, in Chicago.

== Track listing ==
Motordrome track listing
No.	Title	Writer(s)	Producer(s)	Length
1.	"Kindness"	Karen Marie Ørsted; Ariel Rechtshaid; Jack Latham; Jakob Littauer	Rechtshaid; Jam City^{[m]}; Jim-E Stack^{[m]}; Littauer^{[m]}	3:14
2.	"Live to Survive"	Ørsted; Caroline Ailin; Samuel George Lewis; Sylvester Sivertsen	SG Lewis; Sly	3:04
3.	"Wheelspin"	Ørsted; Littauer; Ronni Vindahl	Littauer; Vindahl; MØ^{[m]}	2:51
4.	"Cool to Cry"	Ørsted; Sivertsen; Ailin; Rechtshaid; Noonie Bao; Linus Wiklund	Rechtshaid; Jam City^{[m]}; Jim-E Stack^{[m]}; Littauer^{[m]}	2:51
5.	"Youth Is Lost"	Ørsted; Littauer	Littauer	3:45
6.	"New Moon"	Ørsted; Sivertsen; Ailin; Bao; Wiklund	Sly; Lotus IV	3:14
7.	"Brad Pitt"	Ørsted; Littauer; Ajay Bhattacharya; Michael Pollack; Daniel Schnair; Mads Damsgaard; Ronni Vindahl	Littauer; Stint; MØ^{[m]}	3:01
8.	"Goosebumps"	Ørsted; Littauer	Littauer; MØ^{[m]}	3:16
9.	"Hip Bones"	Ørsted; Littauer; Vindahl	Vindahl; Littauer^{[m]}; MØ^{[m]}	3:21
10.	"Punches"	Ørsted; Littauer; Damsgaard; Vindahl; Søren Breum	Littauer; Vindahl^{[m]}; MØ^{[m]}	3:26
Total length:				32:15

Motordrome (The Dødsdrom Edition)
No.	Title	Writer(s)	Producer(s)	Length
1.	"Spaceman"	Ørsted; Ilsey Juber; Jas Mann; Bao; Oscar Holter	Oscar Holter	2:43
2.	"True Romance"	Ørsted; Littauer; Vindahl	Littauer; Vindahl	3:02
3.	"Bad Mood"	Ørsted; Vindahl	Vindahl	3:20
4.	"Real Love"	Ørsted; Stint; Goss; Tobias Laust Hansen	Stint; Goss; Hansen	2:28
Total length:				43:43

=== Notes ===
- ^{^[m]} signifies a miscellaneous producer.
- "Spaceman" interpolates Babylon Zoo's 1995 track "Spaceman" from their debut album The Boy with the X-Ray Eyes.

== Personnel ==
Musicians

- MØ – vocals
- Jake Braun – cello (1)
- SG Lewis – bass, drums, guitar, keyboards, programming, synthesizer (2)
- Rasmus Littauer – programming (5), drums (10)
- Andreas Lund – guitar (6)
- Josefine Struckmann Pedersen – background vocals (7)
- Melissa Gregerson – background vocals (7)
- Ronni Vindahl – guitar (7)
- August Rosenbaum – piano (8)
- Yangze – piano (8)
- Live Johansson – cello (10)
- Karen Johanne Pedersen – violin (10)

Technical

- Emily Lazar – mastering
- Chris Allgood – mastering (1, 3–10)
- Geoff Swan – mixing (1, 3–10)
- Serban Ghenea – mixing (2)
- Jasmine Chen – engineering (1, 4)
- Matt DiMona – engineering (1, 4)
- John Hanes – engineering (2)
- Anthony Dolhai – engineering (7)
- Karen Marie Ørsted – vocal production (1, 3–5, 9)
- Ariel Rechtshaid – vocal production (1, 4)
- SG Lewis – vocal production (2)
- Sly – vocal production (2)
- Caroline Ailin – vocal production (2)
- Ronni Vindahl – vocal production (3, 9)

== Charts ==
Chart performance for Motordrome
Chart (2022)	Peak position
Danish Albums (Hitlisten)	9

== Release history ==
Release dates and formats for Motordrome
Region	Date	Version	Format	Label	Ref.
Various	28 January 2022	Standard	Digital download; streaming	Sony UK	
Various	8 July 2022	Standard	LP	Sony UK	
Various	12 August 2022	The Dødsdrom Edition	Digital download; streaming	Sony UK	
