= Yaeji =

American house and trap artist (born 1993)

- Born: Kathy Yaeji Lee; August 6, 1993 (age 32); Queens, New York City, U.S.
- Genres: Electronic; house
- Occupations: DJ; singer; music producer
- Years active: 2016–present
- Labels: Godmode; XL
- Website: yaeji.com

Korean name
- Hangul: 이예지
- RR: I Yeji
- MR: I Yeji

Kathy Yaeji Lee (Korean: 이예지; born August 6, 1993), known professionally as Yaeji, is an American singer, DJ, and producer based in Brooklyn, New York. Her style blends elements of house music and hip hop with mellow, quiet vocals sung in both English and Korean.

== Early life ==
Kathy Yaeji Lee was born August 6, 1993, in Flushing, Queens, as a single child in a Korean family. She moved from New York to Atlanta, Georgia when she was 5, and then to South Korea in the third grade. While living in South Korea, Yaeji switched between different international schools on a yearly basis, leading her to find friends on the Internet, where she would first discover music. She also briefly attended school in Japan before moving back to Korea.

Yaeji eventually moved back to the United States to study conceptual art, East Asian studies, and graphic design at Carnegie Mellon University in Pittsburgh. She embraced DJing as a hobby while attending Carnegie Mellon, crediting the afterhours electronic music dance party Hot Mass with her "indoctrination into nightlife." Yaeji learned how to use Traktor and began DJing at house parties. She DJed for two years before learning Ableton, making her own music and debuting on Carnegie Mellon's college radio station WRCT. Yaeji graduated from Carnegie Mellon in 2015.

== Career ==
After graduation, Yaeji moved back to New York City to get involved in the music scene and to DJ. Her first single, "New York '93", referring to her year of birth, was issued on the New York City label Godmode on February 29, 2016, followed by a cover of "Guap" by Australian DJ Mall Grab that May. She had previously uploaded songs to SoundCloud, although they were removed; this included "Areyouami", which was released when she was at college.

Her debut eponymous EP, including both prior singles, was released by Godmode on March 31, 2017.

She began to gain attention following her first Boiler Room session in May 2017, which involved a remix of Drake's single "Passionfruit". The song was later released officially on Godmode's SoundCloud page. The first of several stand-alone singles, "Therapy" was issued in July 2017, followed by a two-track digital single, Remixes, Vol. 1, on August 1 and the "Last Breath" single on August 28. The music video for the single "Drink I'm Sippin On" was released on 88rising's YouTube channel in October 2017, quickly gaining over one million views in two weeks. On November 3, 2017, Yaeji released her second EP, EP2, to positive reviews and moderate commercial success. The video for "Raingurl" was released on November 16.

Yaeji was named to the BBC's Sound of 2018 longlist in November 2017. She also performed at the 2018 Coachella Festival.

In 2021, "Raingurl" made it into New York Times's T magazine Spotify playlist, "Right Here: Asian Women Artists in the West." She also performed at BRIC's Celebrate Brooklyn! music festival, where she was rushed by fans.

A year after her release of "What We Drew", and a year into the global COVID-19 pandemic, Yaeji released her first collaborative work with Korean Indie band front man Oh Hyuk of Hyukoh. The release consisted two tracks: "Year to Year" and "29". Despite being artists of different genres, both artists were able to rediscover the joy that they feel when creating music because of the collaboration. Her debut album, With a Hammer, was released in April 2023. The lead single, "For Granted", was released in January 2023. "Done (Let's Get It)" followed in February 2023. Yaeji performed at Coachella 2023.

== Personal life ==
As of 2017, Yaeji lives in Brooklyn.

== Discography ==
=== Studio albums ===
Title	Album details	Peak chart positions
Title	Album details	US World
With a Hammer	Released: April 7, 2023; Label: XL; Formats: CD, digital download, LP	13

=== Mixtapes ===
Title	Album details	Peak chart positions	
Title	Album details	US World	UK Breakers
What We Drew 우리가 그려왔던	Released: April 2, 2020; Label: XL; Formats: CD, digital download, LP	12	15

=== Extended plays ===
List of extended plays, with selected chart positions
Title	EP details	Peak positions
Title	EP details	US Elec. Sales
Yaeji	Released: March 31, 2017; Label: Godmode; Formats: Digital download	—
EP2	Released: November 3, 2017; Label: Godmode; Formats: Digital download	5

=== Singles ===
List of singles
Title	Year	Peak chart positions	Album
Title	Year	JPN Over.	Album
"New York '93"	2016	—	Yaeji
"Guap"	2016	—	Yaeji
"Noonside"	2017	—	Yaeji
"Feel It Out"	2017	—	Yaeji
"Therapy"	2017	—	Non-album single
"Passionfruit"	2017	—	EP2
"Drink I'm Sippin On"	2017	—	EP2
"Raingurl"	2017	—	EP2
"One More"	2018	—	Non-album single
"Waking Up Down"	2020	—	What We Drew 우리가 그려왔던
"What We Drew 우리가 그려왔던"	2020	—	What We Drew 우리가 그려왔던
"Pac-tive"	2021	—	Non-album singles
"Year to Year / 29"	2021	—	Non-album singles
"For Granted"	2023	—	With a Hammer
"Done (Let's Get It)"	2023	—	With a Hammer
"Passed Me By"	2023	—	With a Hammer
"Easy Breezy"	2023	—	Non-album singles
"Booboo"	2024	—	Non-album singles
"Pink Ponies" (with Teddy Geiger)	2024	—	Non-album singles
"Believe in Ya" (with T-Pain and Girl Talk)	2025	—	Non-album singles
"Pondeggi" (with E Wata)	2025	—	Non-album singles
"Booboo2" (with Underscores and Aliyah's Interlude)	2025	—	Non-album singles
"Wo Ai Ni" (with Balming Tiger)	2025	12	Non-album singles

==== As featured artist ====
Title	Year	Album
"Swim Me" (Ellie Herring featuring Yaeji)	2016	What a Joy
"Drink Redux" (DJ OG Uncle Skip featuring Yaeji)	2018	East vs. West
"February 2017" (Charli XCX featuring Clairo and Yaeji)	2019	Charli
"Mirror" (Bambii featuring Jessy Lanza and Yaeji)	2025	Infinity Club II

=== Remixes ===
Title	Year	Remixed Artist(s)
"Leave Me Alone (Yaeji Remix)"	2017	Calypso Rose feat. Manu Chao
"Betty Than I Would (Yaeji Remix)"	2017	Tomas Barfod
"With You (Yaeji Remix)"	2017	The Range & Jim-E Stack
"Focus (Yaeji Remix)"	2018	Charli XCX
"Beach 2K20 (Yaeji Remix)"	2019	Robyn
"Don't Start Now (Yaeji Remix)"	2020	Dua Lipa

=== Videos ===
- "New York '93" (2016)
- "Guap" (2016)
- "Noonside" (2017)
- "Feel It Out" (2017)
- "Therapy" (2017)
- "Last Breath" (2017)
- "Drink I'm Sippin On" (2017)
- "Raingurl" (2017)
- "One More" (2018)
- "Waking Up Down" (2020)
- "What We Drew 우리가 그려왔던" (2020)
- "For Granted" (2023)
- "Done (Let's Get It)" (2023)
- "Passed Me By" (2023)
