= Northtown (EP) =

EP by Shamir
- Released: June 6, 2014
- Genres: Disco; indie
- Length: 19:58
- Label: Godmode
- Producer: Nick Sylvester

Shamir chronology
Northtown (2014)	Ratchet (2015)

Northtown is the first EP by the American singer-songwriter Shamir Bailey, better known by his stage name, Shamir. The EP has elements of R&B, house and dance music. It was produced by Nick Sylvester, the founder of New York's Godmode label, and was released on June 6, 2014. It was rated as one of the best releases by a new artist in 2014.

== Track listing ==
All tracks are written by Shamir except for track 5, by Lindi Ortega.

Tracklist
No.	Title	Length
1.	"If It Wasn't True"	3:58
2.	"I Know It's a Good Thing"	3:57
3.	"Sometimes a Man"	3:48
4.	"I'll Never Be Able to Love"	3:49
5.	"Lived and Died Alone"	4:24
Total length:		19:58

== Production ==
The Northtown EP was produced by Nick Sylvester, founder of the Godmode label. Shortly after graduating from high school, Shamir emailed a demo tape to Godmode, hoping to find a label to release the demo tape. Sylvester called the music "kind of like an R&B 'Yeezus'". He contacted Shamir the day after hearing the tape and invited Shamir to New York City to make some "real music" as opposed to just releasing the demo tape.

== Critical reception ==
Northtown has received generally positive reviews from music critics.

NME, rated Northtown as "one of 2014's most essential new EP's." In a review of the EP for NME, Rhian Daly wrote, "The disco-worshipping, androgynous teen might hail from Las Vegas but on the strength of these five songs (three funky-house stompers, one stupendous ballad and a heart-rending cover of Lindi Ortega) it's fair to say his spiritual homeland is late-'80s Detroit and his god an ill-behaved hybrid of Grace Jones and Frankie Knuckles... If this is the house that Shamir built, I'm moving in."

In July 2014, Radio.com included Northtown in its "New Music To Know: Best of 2014, So Far" profile, noting that "Shamir combines the honest songwriting of Taylor Swift with the theatrics of Lana Del Rey to make something that sounds far wiser than his 19 years".

Foster Kamer of Pigeons & Planes rated Northtown as "2014's most exciting R&B Dance-Pop debut".

In July 2014, Flavorwire named Northtown's opening track one of its "25 Best Songs of 2014 So Far".
