= Biig Piig =

Irish musician (born 1998)

- Born: Jessica Smyth; 22 January 1998 (age 28); Cork, Ireland
- Origin: London, England
- Occupations: Singer; rapper
- Years active: 2016–present
- Labels: RCA, Columbia

Jessica Smyth (born 22 January 1998), known by the stage name Biig Piig, is an Irish singer and rapper. She performs in English and Spanish and was signed to RCA before moving to parent company Sony Music.

Starting in 2016, Biig Piig released singles and EPs for several years, before releasing the mixtape Bubblegum in 2023. Her debut album, 11:11, was released on February 7, 2025.

== Early life ==
Biig Piig was born in Cork, Ireland. She lived in Spain from the ages of four to twelve, after her family had moved on advice that the climate would be better for her brother's asthma. Upon moving with her family back to Ireland, she was at first able to read and write only in Spanish, and had to reintegrate into Irish culture. She moved with her family to West London at the age of 14 where she worked as a late-night poker dealer, and where her parents continue to run a pub.

While taking a music technology class at Richmond College, Biig Piig met Lava La Rue, the founder and creative director of NiNE8, a collective of like-minded young DIY musical artists. Biig Piig subsequently joined NiNE8, and during this period, performed at Soho open mics, finding a new voice at a freestyling session in 2015. It was at this freestyling session that Biig Piig met Mac Wetha, with whom she began writing and who became a major producer for her.

Biig Piig is an alumna of the Richmond upon Thames College.

== Career ==
In 2016 Biig Piig began uploading her music to SoundCloud. In 2017 her single "Vice City" caught the attention of digital music platform COLORS, who invited her to record a live video session of the song at their Berlin studios. Released on 13 April, it was a breakthrough for her, and has been viewed over nine million times on YouTube and streamed more than seven million times on Spotify. She followed it up with the singles "24K" and "Perdida". The latter gained her further notice.

On 27 April 2018 she released the first of a trilogy of projects, the five-track EP Big Fan of the Sesh, Vol 1. Its sequel, A World Without Snooze, Vol 2, followed on 22 March 2019. In June of that year she signed to RCA Records, releasing the track "Roses and Gold" 2 October 2019 in advance of a headlining European tour and her first official label release "Sunny", produced by Zach Nahome.

The third in her trilogy, No Place For Patience, Vol. 3, her first EP on RCA, was released in November 2019 followed by latest EP release The Sky Is Bleeding in 2020, following a string of breakthrough singles including Switch,Don't Turn Around and Feels Right with combined streams of over 60 million.

Biig Piig opened for Glass Animals on their Dreamland tour in November 2021.

In 2021, she collaborated with Metronomy on their single "405". Her single "Fun" was released on 14 June 2022. Biig Piig features on the single "Rainbow Tables" by Bien Et Toi, released August 2022. In September 2022 she issued the single "Kerosene", co-written with Zach Nahome and Maverick Sabre.

== Stage name ==
Biig Piig has explained that the name "puts no pressure on me to be a certain way – I can be a mess, and I can also be cute and put together."

== Discography ==
=== Studio albums ===
List of albums, with release date and label shown
Title	Details
11:11	Released: 7 February 2025; Label: Sony Music

=== Mixtapes ===
List of mixtapes, with release date and label shown
Title	Details
Bubblegum	Released: 20 January 2023; Label: RCA

=== Extended plays ===
List of extended plays, with release date and label shown
Title	Details
Big Fan of the Sesh, Vol. 1	Released: 27 April 2018; Label: Independent
A World Without Snooze, Vol. 2	Released: 22 March 2019; Label: Independent
No Place for Patience, Vol. 3	Released: 1 November 2019; Label: Sony
The Sky Is Bleeding	Released: 21 May 2021; Label: Sony

=== Singles ===
List of singles, with year released and album name shown
Title	Year	Album
"Crush'n"	2017	Non-album singles
"24K"	2017	Non-album singles
"Vice City"	2017	Non-album singles
"Raze : Plan B" (ft. Sukha, Mac Wetha & Benny Mails)	2018	Non-album singles
"Nothing Changes" (ft. Kxrn)	2019	A World Without Snooze, Vol. 2
"Sunny"	2019	Non-album single
"Roses and Gold"	2019	No Place for Patience, Vol. 3
"Switch"	2020	Non-album singles
"Don't Turn Around"	2020	Non-album singles
"Oh No" / "Liahr"	2020	Non-album singles
"Feels Right"	2020	Non-album singles
"Cuenta Lo"	2021	Non-album singles
"Body & Soul" (ft. Emotional Oranges)	2021	Non-album singles
"Lavender"	2021	The Sky Is Bleeding
"Fun"	2022	Non-album single
"Kerosene"	2022	Bubblegum
"This Is What They Meant"	2022	Bubblegum
"Picking Up" (ft. Deb Never)	2022	Bubblegum
"Watch Me"	2023	Non-album single
"4AM"	2024	11:11
"Decimal"	2024	11:11
"Favourite Girl"	2024	11:11
"Ponytail"	2024	11:11
"One Way Ticket"	2025	11:11
"I Don't Wanna Hurt You" (with Clean Bandit)	2026	Non-album single

== Tours ==
=== Supporting ===
- 2024: Aurora — What Happened to the Earth? (for North America)
