= Roskilde Festival 2018 =

- Dates: 1–7 July 2018
- Locations: Darupvej, Roskilde, Denmark
- Website: roskilde-festival.com

The Roskilde Festival 2018 was held on 1 to 7 July 2018 in Roskilde, Denmark. The festival was headlined by Gorillaz, Nick Cave and the Bad Seeds, Nine Inch Nails, Eminem, Bruno Mars, St. Vincent, Khalid, Nephew, David Byrne, Massive Attack, Dua Lipa and Anderson .Paak & the Free Nationals. Rapper Cardi B was set to headline the festival but cancelled due to her pregnancy.

== Headlining set lists ==
Wednesday, 4 July 2018

Eminem
1. "Medicine Man"
2. "Won't Back Down"
3. "3 a.m."
4. "Square Dance"
5. "Kill You"
6. "White America"
7. "Rap God"
8. "Sing for the Moment"
9. "Like Toy Soldiers"
10. "Forever"
11. "Just Don't Give a Fuck"
12. "Framed"
13. "Criminal"
14. "The Way I Am"
15. "Walk on Water" with Skylar Grey
16. "Stan" with Skylar Grey
17. "Love the Way You Lie" with Skylar Grey
18. "Berzerk"
19. "'Till I Collapse"
20. "Cinderella Man"
21. "Fast Lane"
22. "River"
23. "The Monster"
24. "My Name Is"
25. "The Real Slim Shady"
26. "Without Me"
27. "Not Afraid"

Encore

28. "Lose Yourself"
Nine Inch Nails
1. "Branches/Bones"
2. "Wish"
3. "Less Than"
4. "March of the Pigs"
5. "Piggy"
6. "The Frail"
7. "The Wretched"
8. "The Lovers"
9. "Shit Mirror"
10. "Ahead of Ourselves"
11. "God Break Down the Door"
12. "Closer"
13. "Reptile"
14. "Copy of a"
15. "Gave Up"
16. "The Great Destroyer"
17. "Burning Bright (Field on Fire)"
18. "The Hand That Feeds"
19. "Head Like a Hole"
20. "Hurt"
St. Vincent
1. "Sugarboy"
2. "Los Ageless"
3. "Savior"
4. "Masseduction"
5. "Huey Newton"
6. "Year of the Tiger"
7. "Marrow"
8. "Pills"
9. "Cruel"
10. "Cheerleader"
11. "Digital Witness"
12. "Rattlesnake"
13. "Young Lover"
14. "Fear the Future"
15. "Slow Disco"

Encore

16. "New York"
17. "Happy Birthday, Johnny"
18. "Severed Crossed Fingers"

Thursday, 5 July 2018

Bruno Mars
1. "Finesse"
2. "24K Magic"
3. "Treasure"
4. "Perm"
5. "Calling All My Lovelies"
6. "Chunky"
7. "That's What I Like"
8. "Versace on the Floor"
9. "Marry You"
10. "Runaway Baby"
11. "When I Was Your Man"
12. "Grenade"
13. "Locked Out of Heaven"
14. "Just the Way You Are"

Encore

15. "Uptown Funk"
Khalid
1. "8TEEN"
2. "American Teen"
3. "Winter"
4. "Location"
5. "Keep Me"
6. "Better"
7. "Love Lies"
8. "Silence"
9. "Raining in Miami"
10. "OTW"
11. "Young Dumb & Broke"
Nephew
1. "Grundvold"
2. "Mexico ligger i Spanien"
3. "Igen & Igen &"
4. "Byens Hotel"/"Bazooka"
5. "Frankenstein (i Ring PART 1)"
6. "Movie klip"
7. "Du danske supersommer (Superliga)"
8. "First Blood Harddisk"
9. "007 Is Also Gonna Die"
10. "Va fangool!"
11. "Tropper"
12. "Hjertestarter"
13. "Worst/Best Case Scenario"
14. "Police Bells & Church Sirens"

Encore

15. "Sig månen langsomt hæver"
16. "Amsterdam"

Friday, 6 July 2018

Nick Cave and the Bad Seeds
1. "Jesus Alone"
2. "Magneto"
3. "Do You Love Me?"
4. "From Her to Eternity"
5. "Loverman"
6. "Red Right Hand"
7. "Into My Arms"
8. "Girl in Amber"
9. "Tupelo"
10. "Jubilee Street"
11. "The Weeping Song"
12. "Stagger Lee"
13. "Push the Sky Away"
David Byrne
1. "Here"
2. "Lazy"
3. "I Zimbra"
4. "Slippery People"
5. "I Should Watch TV"
6. "Everybody's Coming to My House"
7. "This Must Be the Place (Naive Melody)"
8. "Once in a Lifetime"
9. "Toe Jam"
10. "I Dance Like This"
11. "Every Day Is a Miracle"
12. "Like Humans Do"
13. "Blind"
14. "The Great Curve"
15. "Burning Down the House"
16. "Hell You Talmbout"
Massive Attack
1. "Hymn of the Big Wheel"
2. "Risingson"
3. "United Snakes"
4. "Ritual Spirit"
5. "Girl I Love You"
6. "Eurochild"
7. "Future Proof"
8. "Voodoo In My Blood" with Young Fathers
9. "Way Up Here"
10. "Angel"
11. "Inertia Creeps"
12. "Safe from Harm"

Encore

13. "Take It There"
14. "Unfinished Sympathy"

Saturday, 7 July 2018

Gorillaz
1. "M1 A1"
2. "Tranz"
3. "Last Living Souls"
4. "Rhinestone Eyes"
5. "Tomorrow Comes Today"
6. "Every Planet We Reach Is Dead"
7. "Humility"
8. "Superfast Jellyfish" with De La Soul
9. "On Melancholy Hill"
10. "El Mañana"
11. "Strobelite" with Peven Everett
12. "Andromeda"
13. "Hollywood" with Jamie Principle
14. "Out of Body" with Moonchild Sanelly
15. "Garage Palace" with Little Simz
16. "Stylo" with Peven Everett and Bootie Brown
17. "Magic City"
18. "Dirty Harry" with Bootie Brown
19. "Feel Good Inc. with De La Soul
20. "Souk Eye"

Encore

21. "Lake Zurich"
22. "Saturnz Barz"
23. "Kids with Guns"
24. "Clint Eastwood" with Del the Funky Homosapien
Dua Lipa
1. "Blow Your Mind (Mwah)"
2. "Dreams" / "No Lie"
3. "My Love"
4. "Lost in Your Light"
5. "Be the One"
6. "Genesis"
7. "One Kiss"
8. "Scared to Be Lonely"
9. "No Goodbyes"
10. "Hotter than Hell"
11. "Begging"

Encore

12. "IDGAF"
13. "New Rules"
Anderson .Paak & The Free Nationals
1. "Come Down"
2. "The Waters"
3. "Glowed Up"
4. "Bubblin"
5. "The Season / Carry Me"
6. "Put Me Thru"
7. "Heart Don't Stand a Chance"
8. "Gidget"
9. "Room in Here"
10. "The Bird"
11. "Suede"
12. "Am I Wrong"
13. "Lite Weight"
14. "Luh You"

Encore

16. "The Dreamer"

== Lineup ==
Headline performers are listed in boldface. Artists listed from latest to earliest set times.

Orange
Wednesday, 4 July 2018	Thursday, 5 July 2018	Friday, 6 July 2018	Saturday, 7 July 2018
**Eminem**; Saveus	**Nephew**; **Bruno Mars**; DJ Rashida; Interpol; First Aid Kit	**Massive Attack**; **Nick Cave and the Bad Seeds**; The Minds of 99; Pablo Moses	**Gorillaz**; **Dua Lipa**; Peter Sommer

Arena
Wednesday, 4 July 2018	Thursday, 5 July 2018	Friday, 6 July 2018	Saturday, 7 July 2018
**Nine Inch Nails**; **St. Vincent**; PartyNextDoor	My Bloody Valentine; Stormzy; Stone Sour; **Khalid**; When Saints Go Machine; Black Star	Fever Ray; **David Byrne**; Odesza; Fleet Foxes; Benal; Alex Vargas	**Anderson .Paak & the Free Nationals**; Madball; Mogwai; Veto; C.V. Jørgensen; Albert Hammond Jr.

Apollo
Wednesday, 4 July 2018	Thursday, 5 July 2018	Friday, 6 July 2018	Saturday, 7 July 2018
The Blaze; Nathan Fake; Steffi; Nihiloxica	Ø [Phase] Wilkinson; El Leopardo; Maribou State; 6lack Belly; Juju & Jordash; Cezinando	Ammar 808; Four Tet; Joey Badass; Stefflon Don; James Holden & the Animal Spirits; Nines; New Gen; Equiknoxx feat. Shanique Marie	Mike Skinner & Murkage Present Tonga; MHD; Vince Staples; Kedr Livanskiy; House Gospel Choir; Kali Uchis; Mavi Phoenix

Pavilion
Wednesday, 4 July 2018	Thursday, 5 July 2018	Friday, 6 July 2018	Saturday, 7 July 2018
Bantu Continua Uhuru Consciousness; Dark Tranquillity; I'm with Her; Slaves	Bitori; Oh Sees; Preoccupations; John Maus; Chelsea Wolfe; Yasmine Hamdan; The Weather Station; Turbolens	Baby in Vain; Myrkur; Young Fathers (Sandy) Alex G Richard Dawson Band; Touché Amoré; Skeletonwitch; The Hunna	Slydigs; Sacred Paws; Scour; Omni; Rascasuelos; Yonaka; RVG

Avalon
Wednesday, 4 July 2018	Thursday, 5 July 2018	Friday, 6 July 2018	Saturday, 7 July 2018
Charlotte Gainsbourg; Debo Band; Clutch; Kakkmaddafakka	Heilung; Boris & Merzbow; Dona Onete; Nelson Can; Ben Frost; Tune-Yards; Gamelan Salukat	Watain; Sampha; Bisse; Anda Union; Descendents; Dead Cross; Marlon Williams	De Underjordiske x Fribytterdrømme; Blonde Redhead; Sigrid; KOKOKO! Danny Brown; Large Unit Brazil Edition; Operap

Gloria
Wednesday, 4 July 2018	Thursday, 5 July 2018	Friday, 6 July 2018	Saturday, 7 July 2018
Paal Nilssen-Love's Japan Free Jazz and Noise; Madalitso Band; Pigs Pigs Pigs Pigs Pigs Pigs Pigs	Ond Tro; Motorsav; Nyt Liv; Regelbau Presents Central + DJ Sports + C.K. + Manmade Deejay; Paal Nilssen-Love's Brazil Funk Impro; Superorganism; Smerz; The Dwarfs of East Agouza; Haley Heynderickx	LLNN; Otim Alpha; Celeste; Sandunes; Laurel Halo; HVAD; Minyanta; Lekhfa; Yasuaki Shimizu	Kelly Lee Owens; Palm; Super Parquet; Juana Molina; Myrkur: Folkesange; Kirsten Astrup; Širom; Courtney Marie Andrews

Rising
Sunday, 1 July 2018	Monday, 2 July 2018	Tuesday, 3 July 2018
Slægt; Sista Bossen; Alcabean; Clarissa Connelly; AddisAbabaBand; Eera; Dirt Forge	Pale Honey; Cabal; Luster; Rome Is Not a Town; Kippenberger; Albin Lee Meldau; Gurli Octavia	Tan; Marshall Cecil; Lød; Jakob Ogawa; Maraton; Holm; Konni Kass

Countdown
Sunday, 1 July 2018	Monday, 2 July 2018	Tuesday, 3 July 2018
Baime; Sassy 009; Lyra Valenza; B from E Miriam Bryant; Emil Kruse; Jada	Ctrls; Ecstasy in Order; Mount Liberation Unlimited; Goss; Loke Deph; Fraads	Iris Gold; Simon Littauer; Artigeardit; Fool; Ellis May; Sigma
