= Roskilde Festival 2016 =

- Dates: 25 June–2 July 2016
- Locations: Darupvej, Roskilde, Denmark
- Website: roskilde-festival.com

The Roskilde Festival 2016 was held on 25 June to 2 July 2016 in Roskilde, Denmark. The festival was headlined by LCD Soundsystem, Tame Impala, PJ Harvey, Macklemore & Ryan Lewis, Wiz Khalifa, MØ, Tenacious D, New Order, Red Hot Chili Peppers and Neil Young + Promise of the Real.

== Headlining set lists ==
Wednesday, 29 June

Red Hot Chili Peppers
1. "Intro Jam"
2. "Can't Stop"
3. "Dani California"
4. "Scar Tissue"
5. "We Turn Red"
6. "This Is Where I Belong"
7. "Snow (Hey Oh)"
8. "The Adventures of Rain Dance Maggie"
9. "Right on Time"
10. "Dark Necessities"
11. "Tell Me Baby"
12. "The Getaway"
13. "Californication"
14. "Detroit"
15. "By the Way"

Encore

16. "Under the Bridge"
17. "Give It Away"

Thursday, 30 June

Tenacious D
1. "Kickapoo"
2. "Dude (I Totally Missed You)"
3. "Beelzeboss (The Final Showdown)"
4. "POD"
5. "Rize of the Fenix"
6. "Kielbasa"
7. "The Road"
8. "Low Hangin' Fruit"
9. "Señorita"
10. "Deth Starr"
11. "Throw Down"
12. "Wonderboy"
13. "The Metal"
14. "Dio"
15. "Sax-a-Boom"
16. "Roadie"
17. "Tribute"
18. "Double Team"
19. "Fuck Her Gently"
Macklemore & Ryan Lewis
1. "Light Tunnels"
2. "Brad Pitt's Cousin"
3. "Buckshot"
4. "Thrift Shop"
5. "The Shades"
6. "Arrows"
7. "Wing$"
8. "Same Love"
9. "Growing Up"
10. "St. Ides"
11. "White Walls"
12. "Can't Hold Us"
13. "And We Danced"
14. "Dance Off"

Encore

16. "Downtown" with Eric Nally
PJ Harvey
1. "Chain of Keys"
2. "The Ministry of Defence"
3. "The Community of Hope"
4. "The Orange Monkey"
5. "A Line in the Sand"
6. "Let England Shake"
7. "The Words That Maketh Murder"
8. "The Glorious Land"
9. "Medicinals"
10. "When Under Ether"
11. "Dollar, Dollar"
12. "The Wheel"
13. "The Ministry of Social Affairs"
14. "50ft Queenie"
15. "Down by the Water"
16. "To Bring You My Love"
17. "River Anacostia"

Friday, 1 July

Neil Young + Promise of the Real
1. "After the Gold Rush"
2. "Heart of Gold"
3. "The Needle and the Damage Done"
4. "Mother Earth (Natural Anthem)"
5. "Out on the Weekend"
6. "Unknown Legend"
7. "Human Highway"
8. "Someday"
9. "Alabama"
10. "Words (Between the Lines of Age)"
11. "Winterlong"
12. "Love to Burn"
13. "Powderfinger"
14. "Mansion on the Hill"
15. "Western Hero"
16. "Vampire Blues"
17. "Country Home"
18. "Everybody Knows This Is Nowhere"
19. "Seed Justice"
20. "Rockin' in the Free World"

Encore

21. "Love and Only Love"
Tame Impala
1. "Nangs"
2. "Let It Happen"
3. "Mind Mischief"
4. "Sestri Levante"
5. "Why Won't You Make Up Your Mind?"
6. "Why Won't They Talk to Me?"
7. "The Moment"
8. "Elephant"
9. "The Less I Know the Better"
10. "Daffodils"
11. "Eventually"
12. "Alter Ego"
13. "Apocalypse Dreams"
14. "Feels Like We Only Go Backwards"
15. "New Person, Same Old Mistakes"

Saturday, 2 July

LCD Soundsystem
1. "Us v Them"
2. "Daft Punk Is Playing at My House"
3. "I Can Change"
4. "Get Innocuous!"
5. "You Wanted a Hit"
6. "Tribulations"
7. "Movement"
8. "Yeah"
9. "Someone Great"
10. "Losing My Edge"
11. "Home"
12. "New York, I Love You but You're Bringing Me Down"
13. "Dance Yrself Clean"
14. "All My Friends"
MØ
1. "Don't Wanna Dance"
2. "The Sea"
3. "Waste of Time"
4. "Slow Love"
5. "Freedom (#1)"
6. "One More"
7. "Goodbye"
8. "New Year's Eve"
9. "Walk This Way"
10. "Gone and Found"
11. "Maiden"
12. "Kamikaze"
13. "Lost"
14. "Fire Rides" with Kwamie Liv
15. "Glass"
16. "True Romance"
17. "Final Song"
18. "Pilgrim"
19. "Lean On"
New Order
1. "Singularity"
2. "Ceremony"
3. "Your Silent Face"
4. "Tutti Frutti"
5. "Bizarre Love Triangle"
6. "Waiting for the Sirens' Call"
7. "Plastic"
8. "The Perfect Kiss"
9. "True Faith"
10. "Blue Monday"
11. "Temptation"

Encore

12. "Love Will Tear Us Apart"

== Lineup ==
Headline performers are listed in boldface. Artists listed from latest to earliest set times.

Orange
Wednesday, 29 June	Thursday, 30 June	Friday, 1 July	Saturday, 2 July
**Red Hot Chili Peppers**; The Orchestra of Syrian Musicians and Guests + Damon Albarn	**Tenacious D**; **Macklemore & Ryan Lewis**; Bomba Estéreo; House of Pain	M83; **Neil Young + Promise of the Real**; Foals; Scarlet Pleasure	**LCD Soundsystem**; **MØ**; The Last Shadow Puppets; Dizzy Mizz Lizzy

Arena
Wednesday, 29 June	Thursday, 30 June	Friday, 1 July	Saturday, 2 July
**Wiz Khalifa**; At the Drive-In; Slayer; Bring Me the Horizon	Ghost; Chvrches; **PJ Harvey**; Grimes; Uncle Acid & the Deadbeats; Santigold	James Blake; **Tame Impala**; Schoolboy Q; Mac DeMarco; Biffy Clyro; S!vas	The Minds of 99; Miike Snow; **New Order**; Gojira; Tiken Jah Fakoly

Apollo
Wednesday, 29 June	Thursday, 30 June	Friday, 1 July	Saturday, 2 July
Odesza; D∆WN; Gramatik; Little Simz	Tuskegee (Seth Troxler & The Martinez Brothers); Birdy Nam Nam; Floating Points; Recondite; Dusky; Hello Psychaleppo; Silvana Imam	Skepta; Peaches; DJ Paypal; Stormzy; Young Thug; BadBadNotGood; Anderson .Paak; Lars Vaular	Nero; Shades; David August; Hayden James; Balani Show Business de Bamako; Officerfish-Dumplings; Elf Kid

Pavilion
Wednesday, 29 June	Thursday, 30 June	Friday, 1 July	Saturday, 2 July
Föllakzoid; Hinds; Vince Staples; Aurora	So Pitted; Tsjuder; Ho99o9; Black Breath; Gaye Su Akyol; Júníus Meyvant; Kakkmaddafakka; Elle King	Car Seat Headrest; Mutoid Man; Mura Masa; Letlive; Graveola; Hurray for the Riff Raff; Whitney; Methyl Ethel	Sumac; Imghrane; Protomartyr; Cattle Decapitation; Cate Le Bon; Guardian Alien; Rising; The Entrepreneurs

Avalon
Wednesday, 29 June	Thursday, 30 June	Friday, 1 July	Saturday, 2 July
Sleep; Pat Thomas & Kwashibu Area Band; Action Bronson; Frank Carter and the Rattlesnakes	Savages; Kvelertak; Blood Orange; Courtney Barnett; Destroyer; Choir of Young Believers; Blues Pills	Meshuggah; Highasakite; Tal National; Blaue Blume; Calypso Rose; Jacob Bellens; Liss	Sleaford Mods; Freddie Gibbs; Ana Tijoux; Lightwave Empire; Sturgill Simpson; Danko Jones; Andromeda Mega Express Orchestra; Kalàscima

Gloria
Wednesday, 29 June	Thursday, 30 June	Friday, 1 July	Saturday, 2 July
Anna von Hausswolff; Alex Vargas; Khun Narin's Electric Phin Band	Blood Sport; Diät; Bisse; Baba Commandant & The Mandingo Band; Ex Eye; Blick Bassy; Mueller & Roedelius; Jonah Blacksmith	Kaitlyn Aurelia Smith; Karl Hector & The Malcouns; Paper; Damily; Colin Stetson & Sarah Neufeld; C'mon Tigre; Fox Millions Duo; Vassvik	Dillon; Halshug; Los Pirañas; Kuedo; Qwanqwa; Rancho Aparte; Exec

Countdown
Sunday, 26 June	Monday, 27 June	Tuesday, 28 June
Why Be; Kasper Marott; Soho Rezanejad; Milkywhale; Guns; Gents	First Hate; Kablam; Jamaika; Mwuana; Gundelach; Soleima	Saveus; Kasbo; Ivan Ave; Chinah; Daughters of Reykjavík; Mendoza

Rising
Sunday, 26 June	Monday, 27 June	Tuesday, 28 June
Ondt Blod; Emilie Ramirez; Palace Winter; ORM; Dream Wife; Masasolo; F.M.K.	Phlake; Childrenn; Sudakistan; Bersærk; Virgin Suicide; Shy Shy Shy; For Akia	Klub 27; Katinka; Have You Ever Seen The Jane Fonda Aerobic VHS?; The Powpow; Hockeysmith; Yast; Deadpan Interference

Street
Saturday, 25 June	Sunday, 26 June	Monday, 27 June	Tuesday, 28 June
DJ Set: Immortal Sound Selectors	DJ Set: Girls Are Awesome; Baby Blood	DJ Set: Soundvenue Shout-out; M.I.L.K.	DJ Set: Tuesday Get Down; Khalazer

== Cancelled acts ==
- Future, replaced by Schoolboy Q
