= Vindahl =

Vindahl is a Danish surname. Notable people with the surname include:

- Peter Vindahl (born 1998), Danish footballer
- Ronni Vindahl, Danish music producer
