= XXX 88 =

2013 single by MØ featuring Diplo

Single by MØ featuring Diplo

from the EP Bikini Daze
- Released: October 20, 2013
- Genre: Dark pop; electropop
- Length: 3:39
- Label: Chess Club; RCA
- Composers: Diplo; Karen Marie Ørsted; Ronni Vindahl
- Lyricist: Karen Marie Ørsted
- Producers: Diplo; Ronni Vindahl

MØ singles chronology
"Waste of Time" (2013)	"XXX 88" (2013)	"Don't Wanna Dance" (2014)

Diplo singles chronology
"Elastic Heart" (2013)	"XXX 88" (2013)	"Take Ü There" (2014)

Music video
- "XXX 88" on YouTube

"XXX 88" is a song by the Danish singer-songwriter MØ featuring the American producer Diplo. The two decided to collaborate after MØ mentioned in an interview that she wanted to work with Major Lazer, and fans implored Diplo on Twitter to accept her request. A dark pop and electropop song, "XXX 88" was first premiered on BBC Radio 1 on August 29, 2013, and was officially released as the first single of her debut extended play Bikini Daze on October 20. The song was also included as part of No Mythologies to Follow, MØ's debut studio album released on March 7, 2014.

"XXX 88" received positive reviews from music critics, who praised how well the collaboration worked. The song's release was accompanied by a music video released on September 9, 2013, featuring MØ as a daydreaming teenager. The song charted in Belgium and in the United Kingdom.

== Background and composition ==
"XXX 88"
A 21-second audio sample from the chorus of "XXX 88". The electropop song is mostly driven by synthesizers and a "marching band" beat, and has been stylistically compared to Grimes.

In 2012, MØ released her first single, "Maiden". This song caught the attention of Ronni Vindahl, who would go on to become a long-time collaborator with MØ, and began her rise to stardom. Later, in a 2013 interview with The Fader, MØ commented that the artist she would most like to work with was the electronic group Major Lazer. This caused fans to message Major Lazer member Diplo on Twitter to "please make this happen", leading to MØ's manager pursuing the collaboration; the two artists subsequently met up in Amsterdam and worked together.

"XXX 88" is a "punchy" song which has been described as being dark pop and electropop, with influences from trap and hip-hop. Instrumentally, the song consists primarily of layered synthesizers and brass stabs, alongside a "marching band" beat consisting of trap drums, claps, and "slick" hi-hats. MØ also chants 'hey!' repeatedly during the song's chorus, and at one point "hollers" Diplo's name. Dan Carson of The Line of Best Fit stylistically compared "XXX 88" to songs by the Canadian singer-songwriter Grimes, while Robin Murray of Clash noted that MØ's vocal performance was reminiscent of R&B singers like Brandy and Aaliyah.

== Release ==
"XXX 88" first premiered on BBC Radio 1 on August 29, 2013, and was released for digital download and streaming the next day. The song was later released on October 20, 2013 as part of the EP Bikini Daze, and was officially released as a single the same day. "XXX 88" was later re-released on March 7, 2014 as part of MØ's debut studio album No Mythologies to Follow, alongside other songs first released on Bikini Daze. On November 1, 2019, the song was included on Walshy Fire Presents: MMMMØ – The Mix, a remix album by MØ and Major Lazer member Walshy Fire. "XXX 88" also appeared on the deluxe re-issue of No Mythologies to Follow on March 15, 2024, in honor of the album's tenth anniversary.

=== Music video ===
An accompanying music video for "XXX 88", directed by Tim Erem, was released on September 9, 2013 to MØ's YouTube channel. The video, recorded in Los Angeles over the course of two days, stars MØ as a teenager who, as described by Stereogum's Tom Breihan, "imagines herself as some sort of world-traveling glam-pop superhero". Over the course of the video, MØ, wearing a long ponytail, a gold chain, and a "petite red-striped top", daydreams in her bedroom, dances in an open desert, and rides on a gold motorcycle. Diplo also makes a cameo in the video, appearing "oiled-up naked-except-for-tightie-whities" on the cover of a magazine being read by MØ. The video received over 800,000 views in the first five months after its release.

== Reception ==
"XXX 88" received positive reviews from music critics, with Nick Levine of NME quipping that the song is "snappier than its title". Michelle Geslani of Consequence wrote that the song "works on so many levels", particularly praising its "sweet yet pulverizing" and "hypnotic yet volatile" nature. Laurence Day of The Line of Best Fit similarly called "XXX 88" "equal measures dancefloor catnip... and jagged future-R&B". Various critics particularly praised how the sounds of MØ and Diplo worked well together on the song. Jamie Milton of DIY commented that the combination of Diplo's electronic sound and MØ's "signature old-school synths" rendered the song a "bonafide triumph". Similarly, in their ranking of Diplo's 15 Best Songs, Billboard placed "XXX 88" in the fifteenth spot citing MØ's "breezy" vocal performance combined with a display of "how far Diplo's creative range can really go".

In Belgium, "XXX 88" charted on the Ultratip Bubbling Under at a peak position of 42. The song also appeared on the UK Official Physical Singles Chart at number 53.

== Track listing ==
Digital download
No.	Title	Length
1.	"XXX 88" (featuring Diplo)	3:40

XXX 88 (feat. Diplo) Remixes 1 track listing
No.	Title	Length
1.	"XXX 88" (Faustix & Imanos remix)	4:21
2.	"XXX 88" (Joe Hertz remix)	4:07
3.	"XXX 88" (Oceaan remix)	4:17
Total length:		12:45

XXX 88 (feat. Diplo) [Remixes 2] track listing
No.	Title	Length
1.	"XXX 88" (Kilter remix)	4:54
2.	"XXX 88" (Dreamtrak remix)	6:10
3.	"XXX 88" (Nonsens remix)	3:40
Total length:		14:44

== Personnel ==
Credits are adapted from Apple Music.

- Karen Marie Ørsted – vocals, composer, lyrics
- Diplo – all instruments, musician, composer, producer
- Ronni Vindahl – all instruments, musician, composer, producer, mixing engineer
- Michael Patterson – mixing engineer, mastering engineer
- Paul Logus – mastering engineer
- Thomas Edinger – horn
- Anders Bast – horn

== Charts ==
Chart performance
Chart (2013)	Peak position
Belgium (Ultratip Bubbling Under Flanders)	42
UK Physical Singles Sales (OCC)	53
