= Roskilde Festival =

Danish annual music festival

Coordinates: 55°37′18″N 12°4′36″E

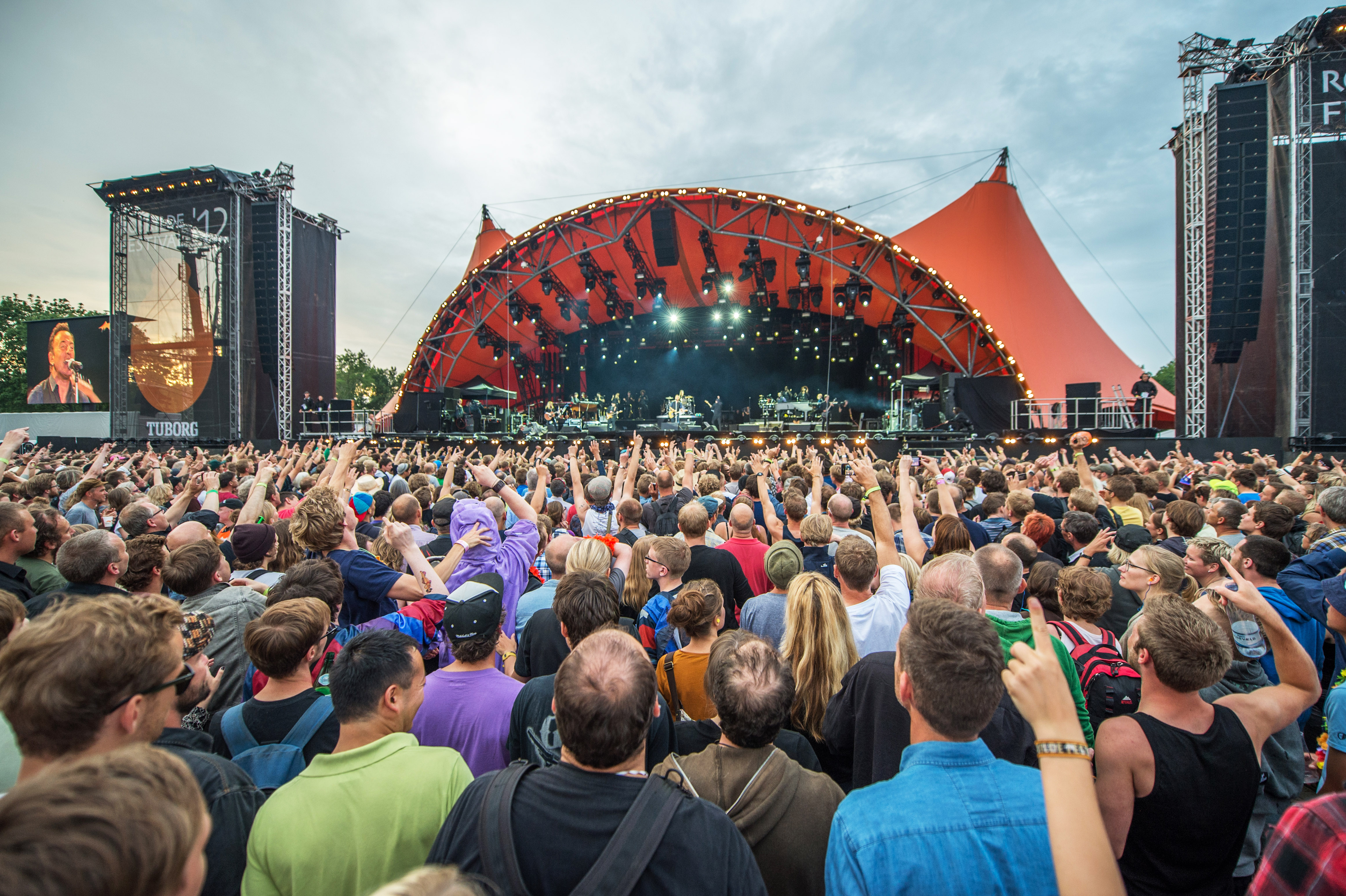
- Genre: Rock; pop; hip hop; electronic; world; experimental; heavy metal; folk; punk; reggae
- Dates: 27 June – 4 July 2026
- Locations: Roskilde, Denmark
- Years active: 1971–present
- Founders: Mogens Sandfær; Jesper Switzer Møller; Carl Fischer
- Attendance: 130.000+ (2024)
- Website: roskilde-festival.dk/en

The Roskilde Festival is a Danish music festival held annually south of Roskilde. It is one of the largest music festivals in Europe and the largest in the Nordic countries. It was created in 1971 by two high school students and a promoter. In 1972, the festival was taken over by the Roskilde Foundation, which has since run the festival as a non-profit organization for development and support of music, culture and humanism. In 2014, the Roskilde Foundation provided festival participants with the opportunity to nominate and vote upon which organizations should receive funds raised by the festival.

The Roskilde Festival was Denmark's first music-oriented festival created for hippies, and today covers more of the mainstream youth from Scandinavia and the rest of Europe. Most festival visitors are Danes, but there are also many visitors from elsewhere, especially the other Scandinavian countries and Germany.

== History ==
=== The beginning ===
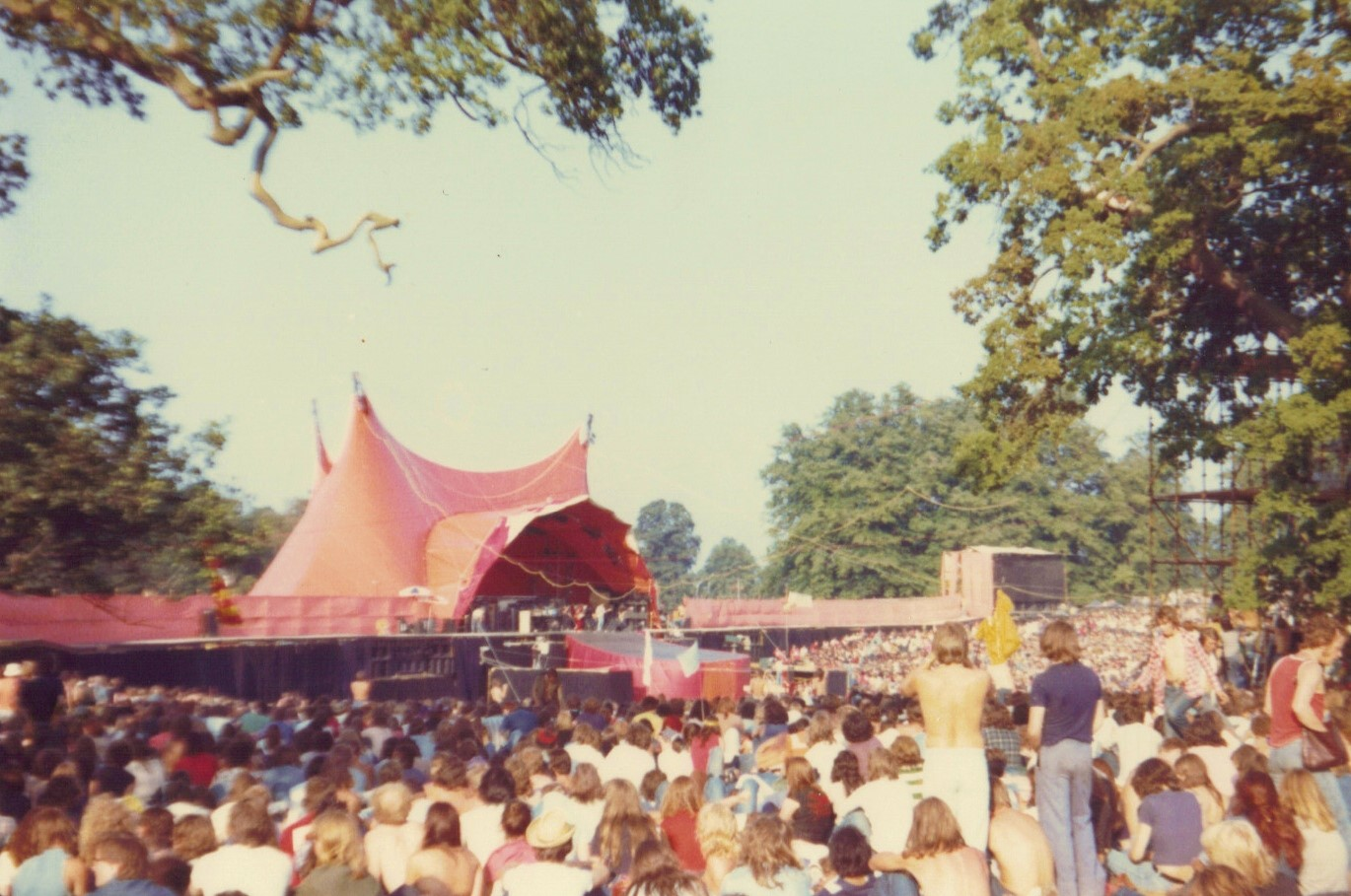
The Orange Stage used by Rolling Stones at Knebworth Fair in 1976, before it was acquired by Roskilde Festival. It has later been significantly upgraded.

The first Roskilde Festival was held on 28 and 29 August 1971, originally named the Sound Festival. It was created by two high schoolers, Mogens Sandfær and Jesper Switzer Møller, and promoter Carl Fischer. It was inspired by festivals and youth gatherings like Newport, Isle of Wight and Woodstock. It was characterized mainly by poor management but also great enthusiasm. The festival's inaugural year saw roughly 20 bands ranging from folk, jazz, rock and pop genres all playing on a single stage, which lasted for two days with some 10,000–13,000 visitors. Because of a lack of time and funds, the two high schoolers withdrew and the next year's festival, under the name Fantasy Festival, was arranged by the non-profit Roskilde Foundation and the American folk singer Tony Busch. The foundation had been involved in Roskilde's city festival since 1932 and had the necessary contacts. Unlike the first year, the 1972 festival produced a surplus and the foundation was able to donate 50,000 dkk (equalling c. 330,000 dkk in 2020) to local projects for children and youths. Many volunteers had been involved in the 1972 festival and this, along with being non-profit, would become a hallmark of the future festivals. Since 1973, the Roskilde Foundation (today known as the Roskilde Festival Group) alone has been responsible for arranging the festival.

In 1978, festival organizers acquired the Canopy Scene, an orange musical stage previously used by the Rolling Stones on a European tour. Since its beginning, the Canopy Scene and its characteristic arches have become a well-known symbol and logo representing the festival.

=== Expansion and professionalization ===
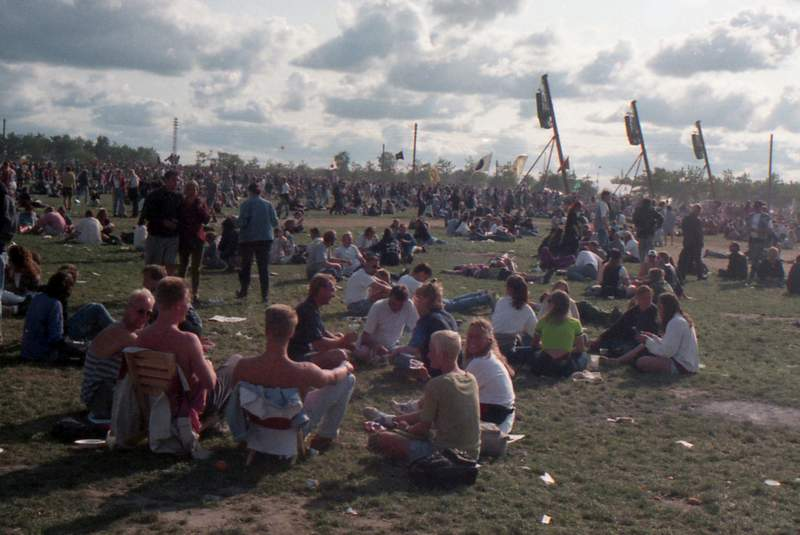
Crowds during the 1995 festival, the first year with more than 100,000 guests

By the early 1980s, the festival was large and well-established, but the workload had become unmanageable for an organization of all-volunteers. It was decided that a professional board of directors and people in several other fields were necessary. Nevertheless, the festival remains non-profit and still relies heavily on thousands of volunteers.

From the 1980s, there has been an expansion in the music genres represented at the festival and more stages have been added. They have continued their history of hiring a combination of large international bands, local bands, and up-and-coming bands, like U2 in 1981. In the 1990s, electronic music was introduced to the festival. In 1991, Club Roskilde was held, which was an electronic music dance club held in the evenings. In 1995, electronic music artists received their own stage. In the following years, even more room for electronic music was created by the establishment of the chill-out zone and the Roskilde Lounge. Since then, artists like Fatboy Slim, The Prodigy, Basement Jaxx and Chemical Brothers appeared on the main stage.

By the 1990s, the number of tickets offered for sale was restricted and later even reduced. Due to steadily increasing popularity of the festival, the number of visitors had increased to up to 125,000. In addition, 90,000 tickets for about 25,000 volunteers, 5,000 media people and 3,000 artists were added. In order to preserve the quality of the festival, the festival organizers decided to limit the number of participants. The distance from the rearmost part of the camping area to the stages of the festival management seemed to have become unreasonable. The festival had become so popular that the festival management decided in 1994 to expand the festival area to the west, providing more space without increasing distances between the campgrounds and the concert venues. The festival site was now divided by the small railway line into two parts. In 1995 the festival inaugurated its own train station, which facilitates the arrival of visitors. In 1997, another tent called Roskilde Ballroom was built. If Roskilde Festival visitors are included in the population of Roskilde, it is the fourth-largest city in Denmark.

In the 2000s, there has been an increasing focus on the footprint of the festival. In 2017, 90 percent of the food sold in food stalls at the festival was organic and a container-deposit system (expanded compared to the one that already exists in Denmark) has been introduced, which resulted in more than eight million items being returned in that year's festival alone. There are programs for efficient waste sorting, increase of recycling levels, and a reduction of the amount of garbage produced. A partnership with DSB has resulted in more direct train links between the Copenhagen Central Station and the Roskilde Festival station, making it easier to reach by public transport.

== Stages ==
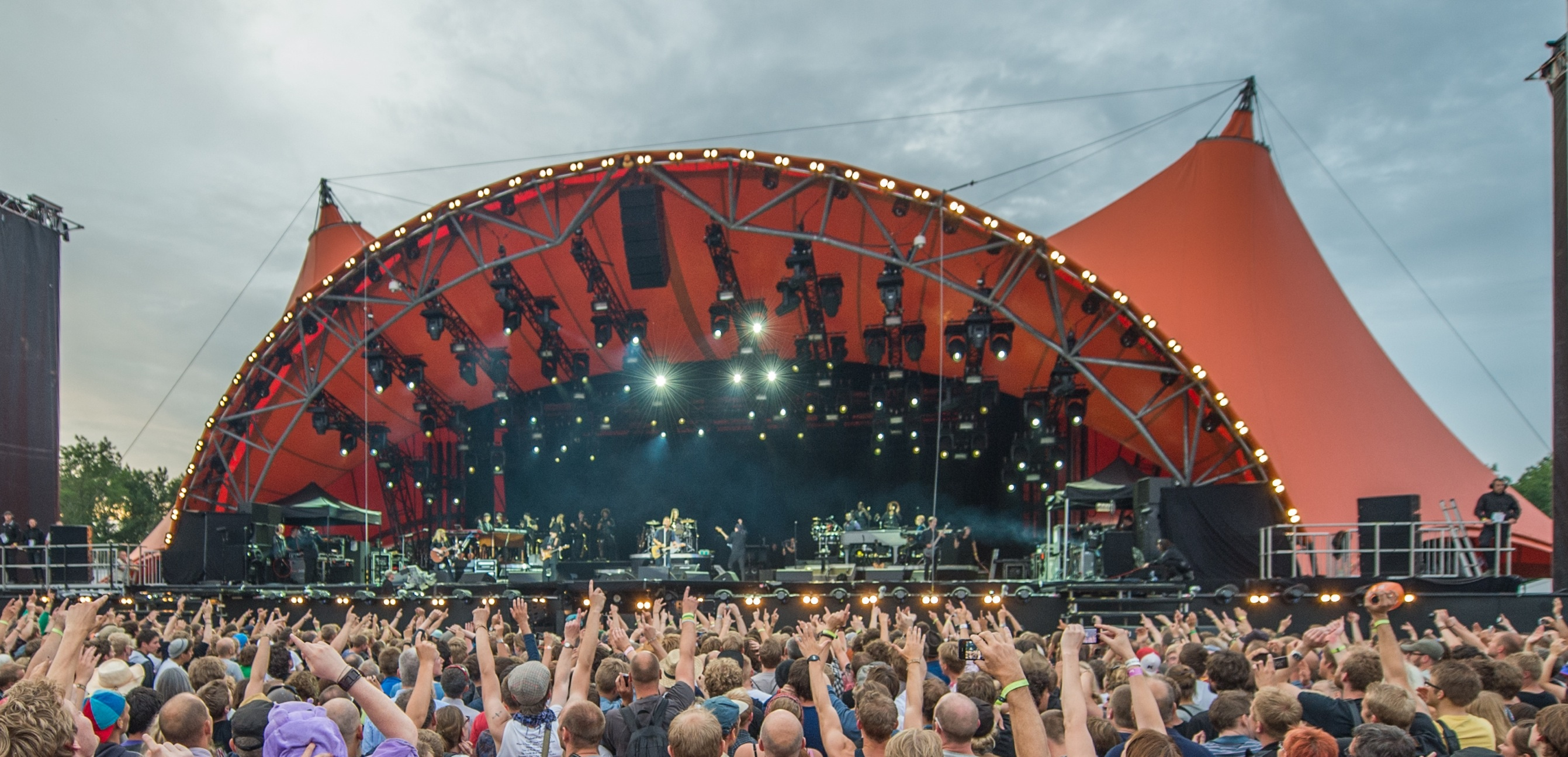
Bruce Springsteen performing on the Orange Stage in 2012

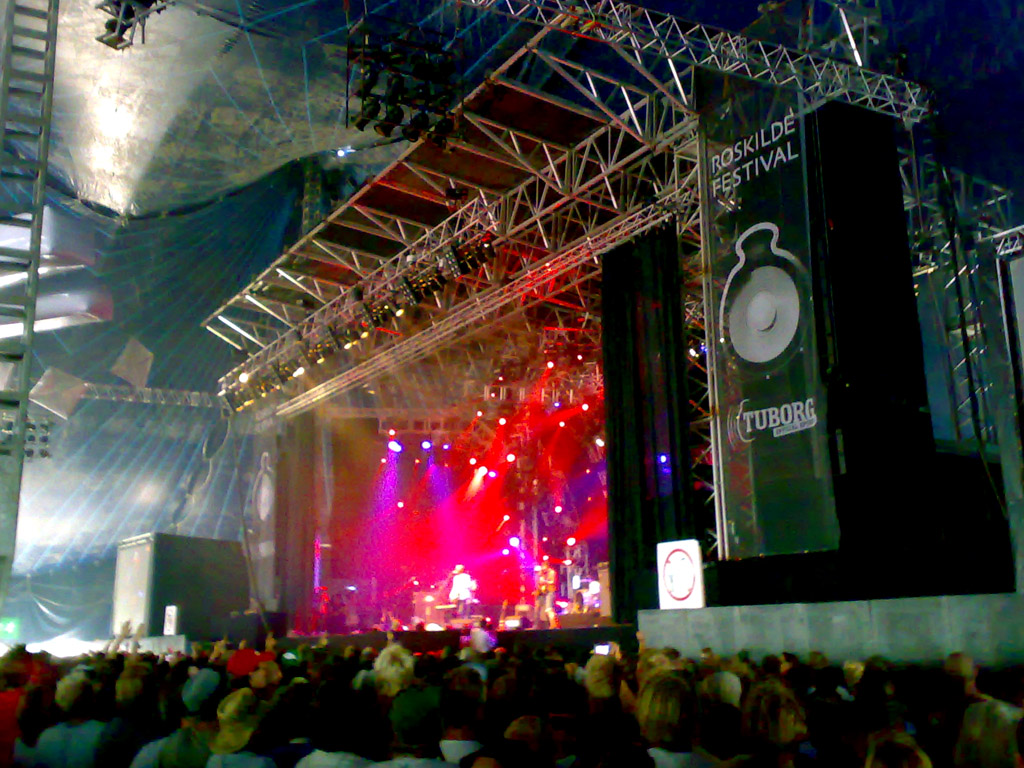
Band of Horses performing on the Arena Stage in 2008

The bands presented at Roskilde Festival are traditionally a mix of well-known artists, cutting-edge artists across all contemporary genres, popular crowd-pleasing acts, local Scandinavian headliners, and up-and-coming names.

As of 2026, the 7 active stages on the Final Days program were Orange, Arena, Lagune, Eos, Gloria, Fauna and Platform. On the First Days program, Eos and Lagune were presenting up-and-coming Nordic acts, and accompanied by 8 other smaller platforms and spaces for events, happenings, talks, music and arts, including Skate, Dancefloor and Cinema.

The stages were until 2003 named after their colour, but as the names had not matched the actual color of the tents for a period, it was decided to rename all stages except the Orange Stage, the central and main stage. The Orange Stage is open in front of a huge field, whereas the other tents cover the whole audience, the largest of which is the Arena stage (formerly known as Green Stage), the largest tent in Europe with an official capacity of 17,000 people.

The 2007 edition saw two new tents, replacing Ballroom (1997–2006) which presented mainly World music, and Metropol (2003–2006) which presented mainly Electronica. In 2010 two stages, Astoria (from 2007) and Lounge, did not return, due to a slight shift in focus towards fewer, but bigger bands. In 2014 the Odeon stage was cancelled along with the surrounding sustainable-style food outlets, and the area was replaced with pre-booked tents for festival guests that prefer not to bring their own.

The music covers such styles as rock, Hip Hop, Metal, urban, electronica and 3rd world contemporary music. It has become a tradition to let a Danish act open the Orange Stage on the first day of the festival. There are often surprising performances by classical acts, film-music, opera etc.

Apart from music there is always some theatre and 'lone acts' wandering around the festival site. Terrain and tents are always decorated in various ways. The current and recent former stages are:

Stage name	Year introduced	Capacity	Main genres	Replaced
Orange	1978	60,000+	All	Big Stage
Arena	2003	17,000	All	Green Stage
Lagune	2026	6,000	All	Avalon, Apollo
Gloria	2011	1,000	Mixed	
Eos	2023	3,000	Mixed	Countdown
Fauna	2026	2,000	Mixed	Gaia, Apollo
Platform	2023	500	Experimental and performance art	
Former stages	Year span			
Avalon	2014-25	6,000	Hip Hop, Electronica, Urban world music, Metal	Cosmopol/Odeon
Apollo	2012-25	5,000	Electronica	
Gaia	2023-25	2,000	Mixed	Pavilion
Countdown	2012-22	5,000	Electronica	
Rising	2014-22	5,000	Mixed – only up and coming Nordic acts	Pavilion Junior
East	2017-22			

== Campsite ==
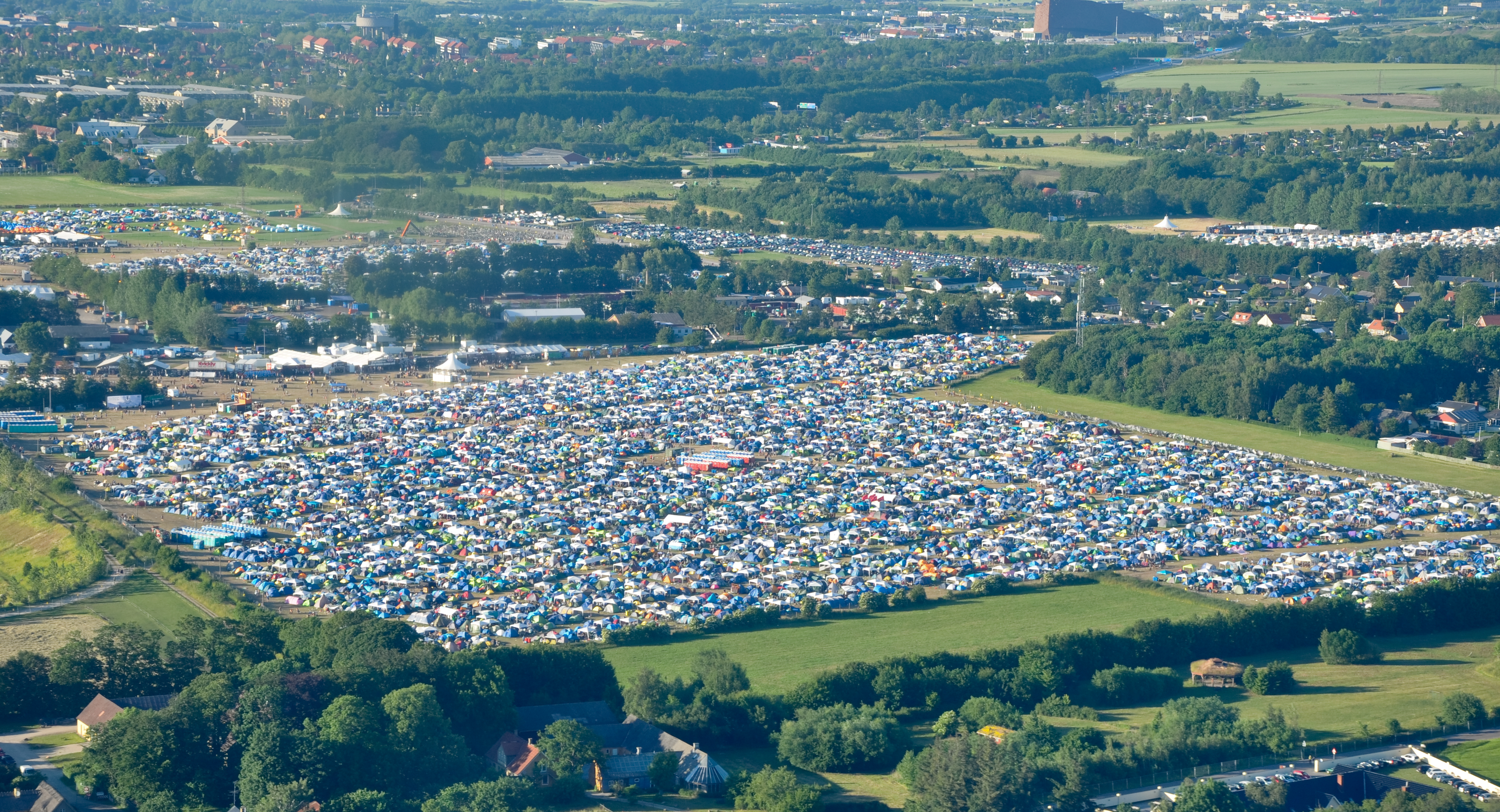
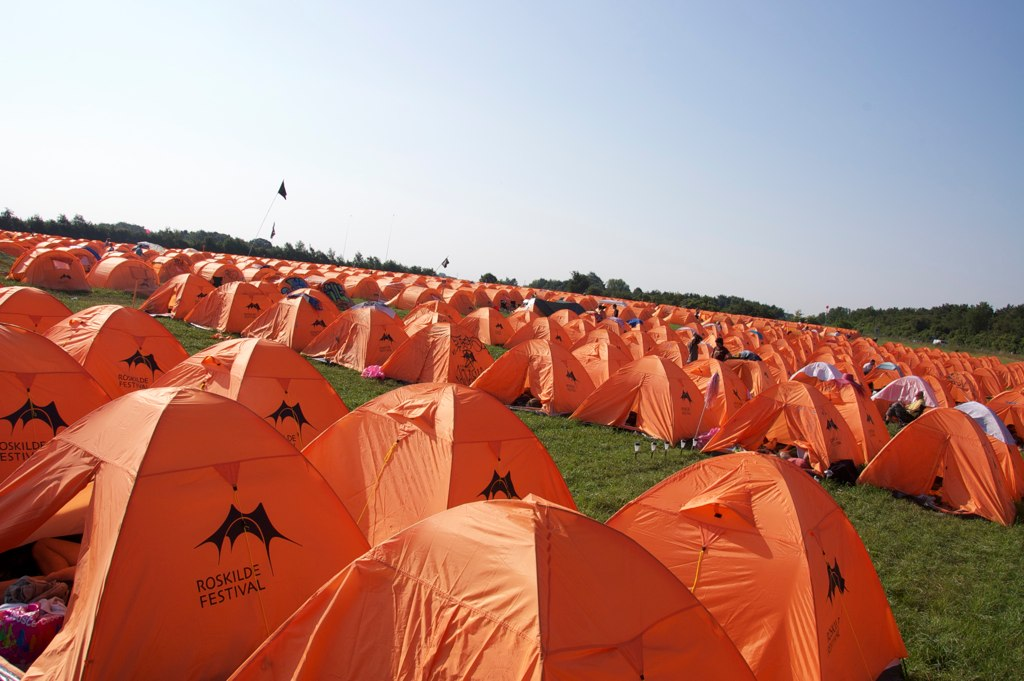
The general campsite (left) and the orange Get-a-Tent where people without their own can buy/rent an already-pitched tent

The festival campsite covers nearly 80 hectares (200 acres) and access to it is included in the ticket price. It usually opens on Saturday afternoon prior to the festival itself. Apart from the small and separate Camping South it is divided into two areas, East and West, each comprising a service center with establishments ranging from food stalls to a cinema. The campsite is further divided into 'agoras' that provide toilets, cell phone charging, and luggage storage. They also host events according to each agora's theme.

As of 2018, a new gate system has been installed. This means that all guests arriving first fill 7 rows of the gate system (1000 people in each). Behind this, a large field holding all remaining guests. At 16:00 on the opening Saturday, the gates open, one row at a time at approx 90sec intervals. Once this is complete, the remaining guests in the back area are free to enter the camping area. The concert sites only opens the following day.

Every year since 1999, on the Saturday of the festival (held on a Thursday in 2015, 2016 and 2017), Roskilde Festival Radio organizes a naked run in a fenced-in track around the camp site. One male and one female winner receive a ticket for the next year's festival. The run has subsequently become a very popular and "legendary" part of the festival.

== Newspaper ==
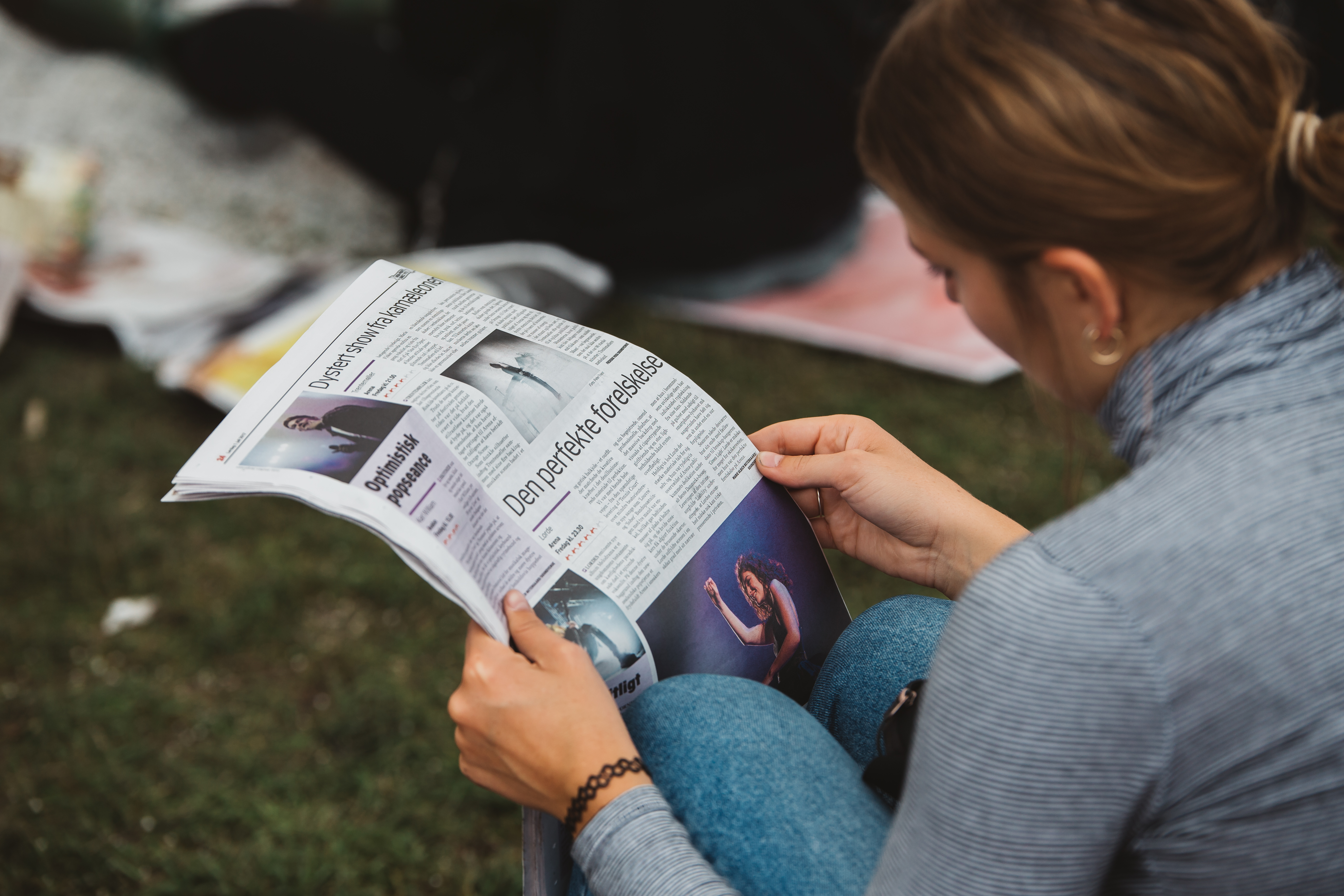
A festivalgoer reading the Orange Press

The Orange Press (named after the main stage) was a newspaper that specifically dealt with events relevant to the festival. First published in 2008, it was made by more than 70 journalists, photographers and music reviewers. It was published daily during the festival and available online and on-site for free until its last issue in 2022. The festival has since decided to focus more on digital communication.

== Specific years ==
=== Overview 1971–present ===
#	Year	Dates	Guests	Headliners	Ticket price in DKK
1	1971	28–29 August	10,000–13,000	Strawbs, Gasolin', Mick Softley, Sebastian	30
2	1972	30 June – 2 July	15,000	The Kinks, Sha Na Na, Family	40
3	1973	29 June – 1 July	15,000	Canned Heat, Gasolin', Fumble, Fairport Convention	40
4	1974	28–30 June	21,500	Status Quo, The Incredible String Band, The Savage Rose, Camel	50
5	1975	27–29 June	26,000	Ravi Shankar, Focus, Mickey Baker, Procol Harum	55
6	1976	2–4 July	32,500	Weather Report, Steeleye Span, Dr. Hook, Magma, Alan Stivell	60
7	1977	1–3 July	31,000	The Chieftains, The Jack Bruce Band, Ian Gillan Band, Dr. Feelgood	80
8	1978	30 June – 2 July	36,500	Bob Marley and The Wailers, SBB, Dave Swarbrick, Elvis Costello	100
9	1979	29 June – 1 July	40,000	Jeff Beck & Stanley Clarke, Talking Heads, Taj Mahal	110
10	1980	27–29 June	50,100	Santana, Joan Armatrading, Dan Ar Bras, Steel Pulse	130
11	1981	26–28 June	51,500	Ian Dury, Robert Palmer, UB40, Toots & the Maytals, Saga	150
12	1982	2–4 July	57,500	U2, Mike Oldfield, Osibisa, Jackson Browne	170
13	1983	1–3 July	60,600	Simple Minds, 10cc, Marillion, Southside Johnny, King Sunny Adé	200
14	1984	29 June – 1 July	64,800	Lou Reed, Paul Young, The Band, The Smiths (cancelled), Björn Afzelius, Club Karlsson	210
15	1985	28–30 June	53,500	Leonard Cohen, Paul Young, Ramones, The Style Council, The Clash, Indochine, The Cure	240
16	1986	4–6 July	56,900	Eric Clapton, Metallica, Phil Collins, Madness, Elvis Costello	390
17	1987	3–5 July	58,700	Iggy Pop, Europe, The Pretenders, Van Morrison, The Flaming Lips, Sonic Youth	320
18	1988	30 June – 3 July	62,100	Sting, INXS, Bryan Adams, Leonard Cohen, Toto	340
19	1989	30 June – 2 July	56,300	Elvis Costello, Joe Cocker, Katrina & The Waves	390
20	1990	28 June – 1 July	70,600	Bob Dylan, The Cure, Gorky Park, Midnight Oil, Sinéad O'Connor	445
21	1991	27–30 June	60,500	Iron Maiden, Winger, Billy Idol, Iggy Pop, Allman Brothers Band, Paul Simon, Primus	490
22	1992	25–28 June	64,500	Nirvana, Megadeth, Texas, Pearl Jam, Faith No More, David Byrne, Phish	540
23	1993	1–4 July	76,500	Ray Charles, Velvet Underground, Bad Religion	540
24	1994	30 June – 3 July	90,000	Aerosmith, Rage Against the Machine, ZZ Top, Peter Gabriel	540
25	1995	29 June – 2 July	111,000	Bob Dylan, Silverchair, Elvis Costello, The Cure, Suede, R.E.M., The Offspring, Van Halen, Oasis (+ Shane MacGowan and The Popes)	600
26	1996	27–30 June	115,000	David Bowie, Sex Pistols, The Flaming Lips, Rage Against the Machine	700
27	1997	26–29 June	115,000	Radiohead • Silverchair • Isaac Hayes • Smashing Pumpkins • Mötley Crüe • Suede • Nick Cave and the Bad Seeds • David Byrne • Pet Shop Boys • Beck • John Fogerty • Sexteto Mayor	750
28	1998	25–28 June	100,000	Bob Dylan • Black Sabbath • Kraftwerk • Beastie Boys • The Verve • Portishead • Garbage	810
29	1999	1–4 July	96,000	R.E.M. • Placebo • Blur • Robbie Williams • Metallica • Suede • Marilyn Manson • Culture Club	810
30	2000	25 June – 2 July	102,000	Lou Reed • Iron Maiden • Oasis (cancelled) • Pearl Jam • The Cure • Willie Nelson • Nine Inch Nails • Pet Shop Boys (cancelled) • D-A-D • The The	860
31	2001	24 June – 1 July	92,000	Bob Dylan • Robbie Williams • Neil Young • Beck • Nick Cave and the Bad Seeds • Aqua • The Gathering • Tool	860
32	2002	23–30 June	100,000	Red Hot Chili Peppers • Rammstein • Travis • Pet Shop Boys • Manu Chao • Garbage	950
33	2003	22–29 June	107,000	Iron Maiden • Blur • Coldplay • Metallica • Massive Attack • Queens of the Stone Age • Björk • Dave Gahan • Zwan • Karamelo Santo	1150
34	2004	27 June – 4 July	106,000	David Bowie (cancelled) • Muse • Santana • Wu-Tang Clan • Iggy Pop • Avril Lavigne • N*E*R*D • Slipknot • KoRn	1150
35	2005	26 June – 3 July	97,000	Black Sabbath • Brian Wilson • Foo Fighters • Green Day • Duran Duran • Snoop Dogg • D-A-D • Kent	1250
36	2006	25 June – 2 July	110,000	Bob Dylan • Guns N' Roses • Roger Waters • Morrissey • Tool • The Strokes • Kanye West • Franz Ferdinand • The Streets	1350
37	2007	1–8 July	110,000	The Who • Red Hot Chili Peppers • Muse • Beastie Boys • Queens of the Stone Age • Björk • Tiesto • Nephew	1475
38	2008	29 June – 6 July	93,000	Kings of Leon • Radiohead • Jay-Z • Neil Young • Judas Priest • Slayer • The Chemical Brothers • Grinderman • My Bloody Valentine	1650
39	2009	28 June – 5 July	110,000	Coldplay • Oasis • Kanye West • Nine Inch Nails • Faith No More • Nick Cave & The Bad Seeds • Pet Shop Boys • Slipknot • Trentemøller	1785
40	2010	27 June – 4 July	125,000	Prince • Gorillaz • Muse • The Prodigy • Patti Smith • Them Crooked Vultures • Jack Johnson • Nephew	1675
41	2011	30 June – 3 July	130,000	Iron Maiden • Kings of Leon • Arctic Monkeys • Mastodon • M.I.A • PJ Harvey • The Strokes • Portishead	1725
42	2012	30 June – 8 July	110,000	Bruce Springsteen • The Cure • Björk • Bon Iver • Mew • The Roots • Jack White	1790
43	2013	29 June – 7 July	110,000	Metallica • Kraftwerk • The National • Queens of the Stone Age • Rihanna • Volbeat • Sigur Rós • Slipknot	1910
44	2014	29 June – 6 July	133,000	The Rolling Stones • Stevie Wonder • Arctic Monkeys • Damon Albarn • Drake (cancelled) • Major Lazer • Outkast • Trentemøller	1910
45	2015	27 June – 4 July	130,000	Paul McCartney • Noel Gallagher's High Flying Birds • Florence and the Machine • Kendrick Lamar • Mew • Muse • Pharrell Williams • Nicki Minaj • Disclosure	1940
46	2016	25 June – 3 July	130,000	LCD Soundsystem • Macklemore & Ryan Lewis • MØ • Neil Young+Promise of the Real • New Order • PJ Harvey • Red Hot Chili Peppers • Tame Impala • Tenacious D • Wiz Khalifa	1995
47	2017	24 June – 1 July	130,000	A Tribe Called Quest (cancelled) • Foo Fighters • Arcade Fire • Justice • Blink-182 (cancelled) • Moderat/Modeselektor • Solange • Trentemøller • Ice Cube • The Weeknd • Lorde	1995
48	2018	30 June – 7 July	130,000	Eminem; Bruno Mars; David Byrne; Gorillaz; Nephew; C.V. Jørgensen; First Aid Kit; Fleet Foxes; Mogwai; Stormzy; Vince Staples; Nine Inch Nails; Nick Cave & the Bad Seeds	2100
49	2019	29 June – 6 July	130,000	Bob Dylan; Cardi B; Travis Scott; MØ; Robert Plant and the Sensational Space Shifters; Robyn; Wu-Tang Clan; Vampire Weekend; Underworld; The Cure; Janelle Monáe	2100
50	2020	28 June – 4 July	Cancelled (Note: The 2020 and 2021 editions of the festival were cancelled due to the COVID-19 pandemic in Denmark.)	Taylor Swift; Deftones; Kendrick Lamar; Faith No More; Kacey Musgraves; Tyler, The Creator; FKA Twigs; Thom Yorke Tomorrow's Modern Boxes; The Strokes; Haim; Thomas Helmig; Malk De Koijn	2250
50	2021	27 June – 3 July	Cancelled	Kendrick Lamar; The Strokes; Tyler, the Creator; Faith No More	2250
50	2022	25 June – 2 July	130,000+	Post Malone; Dua Lipa; Tyler, the Creator; Haim; St. Vincent; The Strokes; Robert Plant & Alison Krauss; Megan Thee Stallion; The Blaze; Kacey Musgraves; TLC; Jada; The Smile; Thomas Helmig	2250
51	2023	24 June – 1 July	130,000+	Blur; Kendrick Lamar; Lil Nas X; Lizzo; Rosalía; Burna Boy; Caroline Polachek; Central Cee; Christine and the Queens; D-Block Europe; Kesi; Latto; Loyle Carner; Queens of the Stone Age; Tobias Rahim; Tove Lo	2400
52	2024	29 June – 6 July	130,000+	21 Savage; Doja Cat; Foo Fighters; Skrillex; SZA; Aurora; Charli XCX (replacing kali uchis); Gilli; Heilung; Ice Spice; J Hus; Jane's Addiction; Jungle; Khruangbin; PinkPantheress; PJ Harvey; Tems; Tinashe; Tyla	2400
53	2025	28 June – 7 July		Charli XCX; Olivia Rodrigo; Nine Inch Nails; Stormzy; FKA Twigs; Deftones; Arca; Doechii; Jamie xx; Fontaines D.C.; Beth Gibbons; Magdalena Bay	2520
54	2026	27 June - 4 July		Gorillaz; The Cure; Zara Larsson; Addison Rae; Lily Allen; Ethel Cain; Wolf Alice; Jade Thirlwall; Little Simz; Yung Lean & Bladee; Kneecap (band); BB Trickz; David Byrne	2600

=== 2000 crush ===
During Pearl Jam's concert at the Orange Stage on 30 June 2000, a crowd crush occurred. Nine people died, and twenty-six people were injured, three of them seriously. The dead, all male, were a 26-year-old German, a 23-year-old Dutchman, a 24-year-old Australian (who died a few days later in a hospital), three Swedes, two aged 22 and one 20, and three Danes, one aged 22 and two aged 17.

The concert began late in the evening around 22:30 CEST and had an audience of about 50,000, a fairly typical size for large concerts at this stage. About half an hour after the concert began, many people fell down at one place, primarily due to a series of wave-like motions in the audience, which were the result of some trying to get closer to the stage. When they did not immediately get up, others were pushed over them and crowd surfers fell into this "hole" that was a few metres in size. The people at the bottom died of asphyxiation, likely within five minutes. On the day of the incident, there was also heavy rainfall, which could have contributed to the ground being slippery.

Most people who fell were at a location not far from the stage, but initially not easily seen and out of easy reach for the security guards because of the dense crowd. Some of the concertgoers who were lifted over the barrier at the stage told the security about the seriousness of the situation further back. The band was informed and stopped the music, and told the crowd to step back. This had some effect, but it still took several more minutes before it was possible to get all the victims.

The victims were taken to the adjacent medical tent where they were treated by nurses and doctors, but for some it was already too late. The victims needing further medical treatment were subsequently transferred by ambulances to Roskilde Hospital, about 2 km (1.2 mi) from the concert site. None of the people who died were under the influence of drugs and none were heavily impaired by alcohol. In the area where the main fall happened, several women had been helped out earlier because they were nervous about the pushing and crowd surfers; this might explain why all the people who died were men. Because of the large size of the concert, some concertgoers only realized how serious it had been after they had left the venue.

Pet Shop Boys and Oasis cancelled their performances, whereas D.A.D. (the unofficial "house band" of the festival), which was already scheduled to hold the festival's final concert, decided to change it into a memorial concert for the people who had not yet left the festival. The incident was examined separately by police, public prosecutors, and subsequent civil trials, all of which determined that it was accidental and that there had been no criminal actions, although the response time from when the people fell over until they were rescued was criticized.

Before this, there had not been major incidents at Roskilde and it was generally considered a very safe festival. Following a detailed review, several new measures were implemented such as a larger safety area with extra emergency exits in front of the stage, more "hard" and "soft" systems to control the number of people allowed into each concert, more spacing and clear separation between audience sections with separate entrances/exits, an expanded video surveillance system making it easier to detect potential problems early, more guards among the audience, an emergency system where the safety staff can shut down the entire concert at the push of a single button, and the chain-of-command was strengthened. Each year, the Roskilde Festival performs a new safety review. A safety network of European festivals and concerts, along with experts, was started (the "YES Group") and many of the measures introduced in Roskilde have later been added elsewhere. As crowd surfing seems to have been among the precipitating factors, it was subsequently forbidden at many festivals in Europe. In part because of the accident at Roskilde, Glastonbury Festival in the United Kingdom was cancelled in 2001 to implement extra safety measures.

Pearl Jam's song "Love Boat Captain" references the tragedy with the line "Lost nine friends we'll never know... two years ago today." When performed in concert, lead singer Eddie Vedder modifies the lyric to reflect the passage of time since the tragedy. Prior to the opening of the 2001 festival, a memorial to those killed in 2000 containing a stone with the inscription "How fragile we are" (a quote from the Sting song "Fragile") surrounded by nine trees had been made. At the official opening of the 2010 festival (the 10-year anniversary), Patti Smith held the short pre-concert ceremony, and she chose to open the tribute with accompanying music from Mozart. Her lead guitarist, Lenny Kaye, then read out the nine men's names while Smith threw nine roses into the crowd.

=== 2005 ===
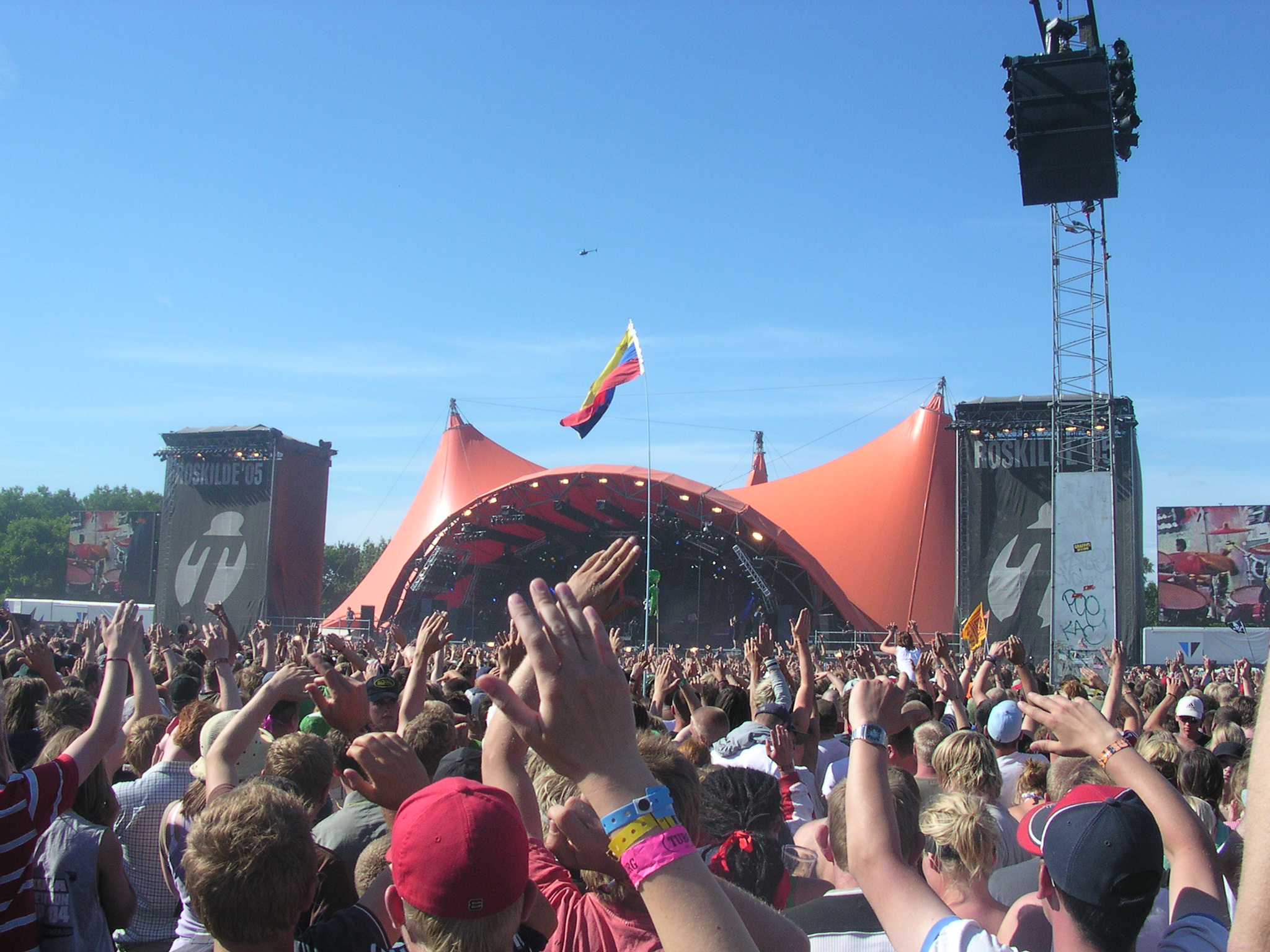
Roskilde Festival 2005 – Snoop Dogg on Orange Stage

The 2005 edition featured artists such as Audioslave, Autechre, Snoop Dogg, Black Sabbath, D-A-D, Duran Duran, Foo Fighters, Green Day, Brian Wilson, Fantômas, Kent, Sonic Youth, Interpol and more than 160 other bands and DJs. The year's weather was also a huge contrast to the previous year. Hot and sunny all week.

=== 2006 ===
With more than 79,000 paying visitors (as well as approximately 20,000 volunteer day workers), the 2006 festival was among the biggest in Europe for the year. With only one day of rain and the rest of the week being sunny, this festival also ranks as one with lucky weather conditions. Changes from the previous year included a new swimming lake – which proved to be very successful due to the warm and sunny weather – and a lounge stage called Bar'n. Some of the performing artists were Bob Dylan, Immortal Technique, Roger Waters, Guns N' Roses, Tool, The Strokes, Deftones, Morrissey, Franz Ferdinand, Kanye West, Placebo, Bullet for My Valentine, Arctic Monkeys, Sigur Rós and The Streets. Danish band Magtens Korridorer opened Orange Stage.

=== 2007 ===
Roskilde Festival 2007 turned out to be the wettest one yet, by a rather large margin: Approximately 46 mm of rain fell during the course of the festival, as opposed to 43 mm in 1997, which was the wettest before 2007. The full programme was released on 19 April 2007 and included bands such as Muse, Queens of the Stone Age, Björk, Beastie Boys, My Chemical Romance, Arctic Monkeys, The Who, Red Hot Chili Peppers, The Killers, Tiësto, Nephew and L.O.C. Danish band Volbeat opened Orange Stage.

=== 2008 ===
Roskilde Festival 2008 was dry with the exception of a 10-minute shower on Saturday 5 July and rain that started around 22:00 on Sunday 6 July. The sun shone for the rest of the festival. The full programme was released on 16 April 2008 and included Jay-Z, The Chemical Brothers, Band of Horses, Duffy, Kings of Leon, Neil Young, Radiohead, Grinderman, My Bloody Valentine, Gnarls Barkley, Girl Talk, The Dillinger Escape Plan, The Streets, Judas Priest, Slayer, Tina Dickow, and the Hellacopters.

=== 2009 ===
Petter performed at the festival and had prominent visitors on stage such as Dee Pee from Rockers By Choice, and L.O.C, Nine Inch Nails, Kanye West, Nick Cave and the Bad Seeds, Oasis, Coldplay, Faith No More, The Mars Volta, Volbeat, Slipknot, Lily Allen and Pet Shop Boys, Malk de Koijn, Trentemøller and Jooks.

=== 2010 ===
Main names in 2010 were Gorillaz, Nephew, Them Crooked Vultures, Alice In Chains, Dizzy Mizz Lizzy, The Prodigy, Muse, Kashmir, Prince and Motörhead. The weather at 2010 festival was warm and sunny.

=== 2011 ===
The 2011 had nice weather the first few days, but on Thursday-Friday there was massive rain. The tickets were sold out, with a projected profit of around 10 million Kr. The opening of Orange Stage was done by Danish Veto, and was closed by Kings of Leon. On 2 July, a 35-year-old German woman died after she, in an apparent attempt of teasing the guards, crawled over a safety barrier and accidentally fell 26 m (85 ft) from the Tuborg tower (the tower was subsequently removed entirely).

=== 2013 ===
The 2013 festival featured acts such as Metallica, Sigur Rós, Volbeat, Kvelertak, Goat, Queens of the Stone Age, C2C, Daedelus, Slipknot, Disclosure, Chase and Status, Baauer, Holy Other, Jam City, Vatican Shadow and When Saints Go Machine and Rihanna.

=== 2017 ===
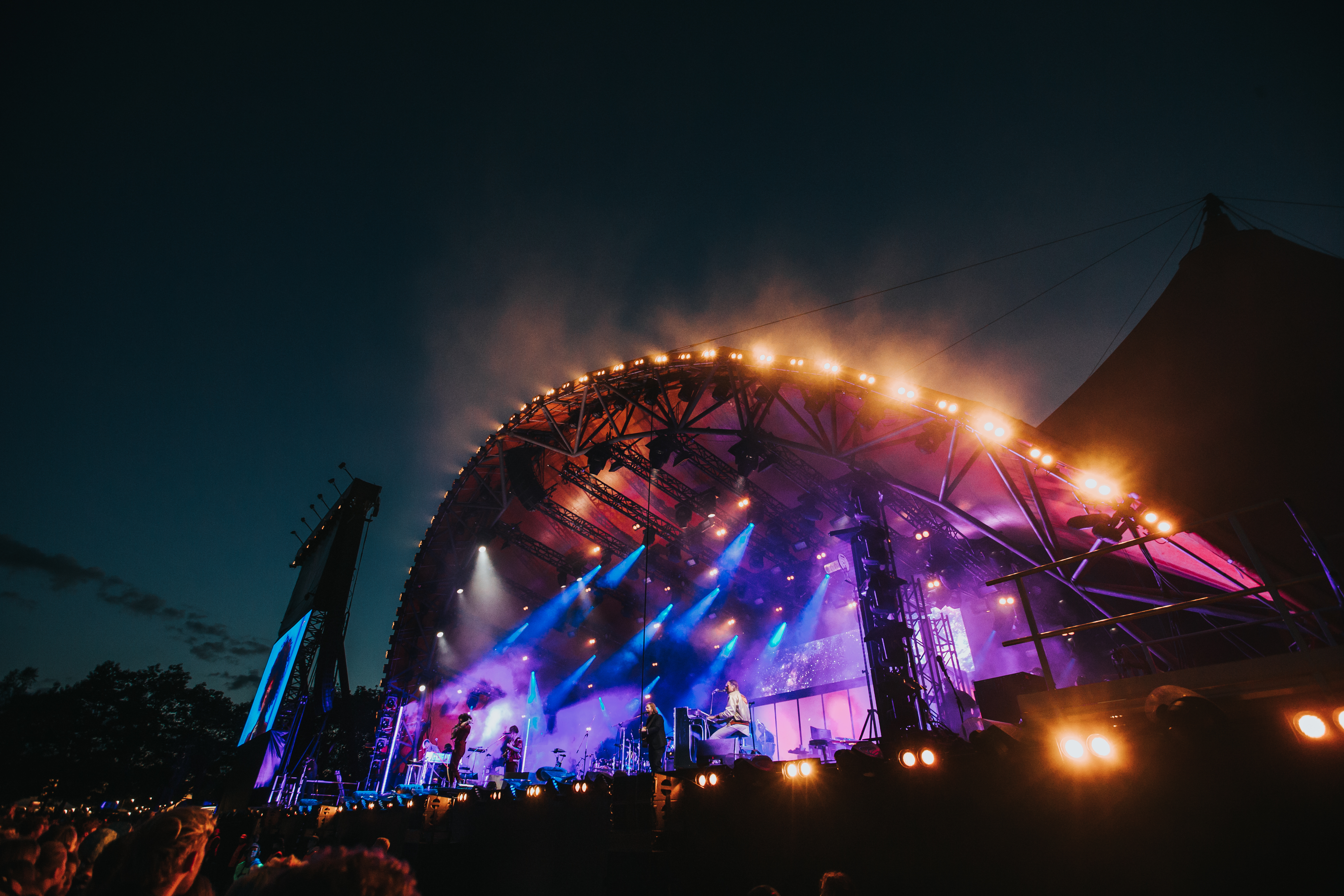
Arcade Fire performing during the 2017 festival

The 2017 festival featured acts such as Foo Fighters, Arcade Fire, The Weeknd, The xx, Ice Cube, Justice, Moderat, Solange, Lorde and Trentemøller.

=== 2018 ===
The 2018 festival featured acts such as Joey Badass, Black Star, David Byrne, Nick Cave and the Bad Seeds, Descendents, Eminem, Fever Ray, First Aid Kit, Fleet Foxes, Four Tet, Ben Frost, Charlotte Gainsbourg, Gorillaz, Interpol, C.V. Jørgensen, Khalid, Dua Lipa, Chelsea Manning, Bruno Mars, Massive Attack, Mogwai, Pablo Moses, My Bloody Valentine, Nephew, Nine Inch Nails, Odesza, Anderson Paak & The Free Nationals, Mike Skinner, St. Vincent, Vince Staples, Stone Sour, Stormzy, The Minds of 99, Alex Vargas and When Saints Go Machine.

=== 2019 ===
The 2019 festival, which had a lineup of over 170 artists, featured acts such as Tears for Fears, The Cure, Bob Dylan, Robert Plant, Travis Scott, Noel Gallagher, Cardi B, Cypress Hill, Neneh Cherry, Rosalía, Testament, Philip H. Anselmo & the Illegals, Ulver, and Behemoth.

=== 2020 ===
The 2020 festival with performers such as Taylor Swift, Deftones, Thom Yorke, and others was supposed to start on 1 July, but was cancelled due to the COVID-19 pandemic.

== See also ==
- List of historic rock festivals
- List of music festivals
- Crowd control
- Pop culture
- Youth subculture
