= Don't Wanna Dance (MØ song) =

Single by MØ

from the album No Mythologies to Follow
- Released: 17 January 2014
- Recorded: 2012–2013
- Length: 3:17
- Label: Chess Club; RCA Victor
- Songwriters: Karen Marie Ørsted; Ronni Vindahl
- Producers: Ronni Vindahl; James Dring

MØ singles chronology
"XXX 88" (2013)	"Don't Wanna Dance" (2014)	"Say You'll Be There" (2014)

Music video
- "Don't Wanna Dance" on YouTube

"Don't Wanna Dance" is a song by Danish singer-songwriter MØ. The song was released as a digital download in Denmark on 17 January 2014 through Chess Club and RCA Victor as the lead single from her debut studio album No Mythologies to Follow (2014). The song has peaked at number 25 on the Danish Singles Chart.

== Charts ==
Chart performance for "Don't Wanna Dance"
Chart (2014)	Peak position
Belgium (Ultratip Bubbling Under Flanders)	59
Denmark (Tracklisten)	25

== Certifications ==
Region	Certification	Certified units/sales
Denmark (IFPI Danmark)	Gold	1,300,000^{†}
^{†} Streaming-only figures based on certification alone.

== Release history ==
Region	Date	Format	Label	Ref.
Denmark	17 January 2014	Digital download	Chess Club; RCA Victor	
