= Crushing Digits =

Studio album by VETO
- Released: May 5, 2008
- Genre: Electronic rock
- Length: 39:13
- Label: Sony BMG
- Producer: Veto

VETO chronology
There's A Beat In All Machines (2006)	Crushing Digits (2008)	Everything is Amplified (2011)

Crushing Digits is the second studio album by the Danish electrorock band VETO. It was released May 2008 in Denmark and in September in rest of Europe.

The album was rated a 7 out of 12 by Markus Hockenbrink of Visions.de.

== Track listing ==
No.	Title	Length
1.	"Blackout"	3:47
2.	"Built to Fail"	3:47
3.	"Shake"	3:29
4.	"You Say Yes, I Say Yes"	3:58
5.	"Crooks"	4:20
6.	"Digits"	3:52
7.	"Unite"	3:07
8.	"You Can't Afford It"	3:22
9.	"Spit It Out"	4:25
10.	"Duck, Hush and Be Still"	5:08
