= Konkylie =

Studio album by When Saints Go Machine
- Released: 6 June 2011
- Length: 38:31
- Label: Studio !K7

When Saints Go Machine chronology
Ten Makes a Face (2008)	Konkylie (2011)	Infinity Pool (2013)

Professional ratings
Aggregate scores
Source	Rating
Metacritic	74/100
Review scores
Source	Rating
AllMusic	4.5/5 stars
Drowned in Sound	8/10
DIY	4/5 stars
MusicOMH	4/5 stars
PopMatters	7/10
Prefix Mag	6.5/10

Konkylie is the second studio album by Danish electropop band When Saints Go Machine. It was released on 6 June 2011 by Studio !K7.

== Critical reception ==
Konkylie was met with "generally favorable" reviews from critics. At Metacritic, which assigns a weighted average rating out of 100 to reviews from mainstream publications, this release received an average score of 74 based on 9 reviews.

In a review for Drowned in Sound, critic reviewer John Brainlove wrote: "Konkylie is an impressive, accomplished collection of songs from a band coming into their own. They've succeeded in accomplishing what all so many artists strive for: cleanly synthesising their feelings and thoughts into sound." At MusicOMH, Ben Edgell said: "Konkylie is a vibrant, often intense, mix of house and pop, infused, wonderfully, with both a spiritual glow and a dark clubland soul."

=== Accolades ===
Publications' year-end list appearances for Konkylie
Critic/Publication	List	Rank	Ref
Clash	Clash's Top 40 Albums of 2011	39	
Drowned in Sound	Drowned in Sound's Top 75 Albums of 2011	6	
The Line of Best Fit	The Line of Best Fit's Top 50 Albums of 2011	6	

== Track listing ==
Konkylie track listing
No.	Title	Length
1.	"Konkylie"	4:10
2.	"Church and Law"	4:51
3.	"Parix"	3:31
4.	"Chestnut"	3:33
5.	"The Same Scissors"	4:02
6.	"Jets"	3:12
7.	"Kelly"	3:37
8.	"On the Move"	3:20
9.	"Whoever Made You Stand So Still"	2:59
10.	"Add Ends"	5:16

== Charts ==
Chart performance for Konkylie
Chart (2011)	Peak position
Danish Albums (Hitlisten)	2
