= No Mythologies to Follow =

Studio album by MØ
- Released: 7 March 2014
- Genres: Electropop; pop
- Length: 43:59
- Labels: Chess Club; RCA Victor
- Producers: Ronni Vindahl; Diplo; James Dring; August "ELOQ" Fenger

MØ chronology
Bikini Daze (2013)	No Mythologies to Follow (2014)	When I Was Young (2017)

Singles from No Mythologies to Follow
- 1. "Don't Wanna Dance" Released: 17 January 2014; 2. "Walk This Way" Released: 3 August 2014

No Mythologies to Follow is the debut studio album by Danish singer and songwriter MØ. It was released on 7 March 2014 by Sony Music by Chess Club Records and RCA Victor.

The album received positive reviews from music critics. At Metacritic, which assigns a normalised rating out of 100 to reviews from mainstream publications, the album received an average score of 76, based on 19 reviews, which indicates "generally favorable reviews". No Mythologies to Follow debuted at number 58 on the UK Albums Chart, selling 1,438 copies in its first week. A Tenth Anniversary edition was released on 15 March 2024. This edition includes three unreleased tracks from the original album sessions. The first of those tracks "Fake Chanel" was released as a single on 26 January 2024.

== Background ==
In an interview with Interview magazine, MØ was quoted saying, "I wrote all of the songs, and I'm attached to all of the songs. They all fit together, and I feel like they're telling a story. If I should name one that I think represents the album very nicely, then it's a song called "Pilgrim". It's very simple and strong in its message. Both production-wise and lyrically, it's very simple and minimalistic, but has some depth to it." The theme for the album is about being young, inexperienced, and being lost in this crazy society we live in these days. Further on the theme she extended, "When you're young and insecure, there's a lot of pressure to live up to these ideals, and it's impossible. It's hard to find your own way and navigate through. That's the theme of the album: to be young and searching." Her track "Pilgrim" was also featured in the Italian version of the advertisement of Armani's fragrance Acqua di Gioia. She noted that the song is wanting to escape the noise of society and just go somewhere private where you can listen to your own thoughts and figure out what you want to be. The track "Don't Wanna Dance" adheres to a collection of squelching synths and was released as a single in February 2014. MØ recorded the vocals for the album in her childhood bedroom.

== Composition ==
No Mythologies to Follow is an electro-pop album that blends elements of synth-pop, R&B, dance, Southern rap, and modern bass music. The album explores themes of youth and young adulthood, presenting a shift from MØ's earlier influences toward a more refined sound. With production primarily by Ronni Vindahl of the duo No Wav., the album features a diverse range of musical styles, reflecting the global nature of contemporary pop music. The result is a polished and cohesive collection that showcases MØ's evolving musical direction. GQ stated that the track "Walk This Way" has "grand vocals" and fantastically produced "dynamic", funky guitar riffs.

== Singles ==
The lead single, "Don't Wanna Dance," was released on January 17, 2014, and charted at No. 25 on the Danish Singles Chart. The second single, "Walk This Way," was released on August 3, 2014, and peaked at No. 33 on the Danish Singles Chart.

MØ recently announced the tenth anniversary reissue of No Mythologies to Follow, which includes new single "Fake Chanel". "Fake Chanel", previously unreleased, was recorded during the original album sessions. The deluxe edition also features three other unreleased tracks, including "New Year's Eve" and her cover of the Spice Girls' "Say You'll Be There".

== Critical reception ==
No Mythologies to Follow ratings
Aggregate scores
Source	Rating
Metacritic	76/100
Review scores
Source	Rating
Clash	7/10
Consequence	B+
DIY	4/5 stars
Drowned in Sound	7/10
The Guardian	4/5 stars
The Independent	4/5 stars
The Line of Best Fit	8/10
MusicOMH	4/5 stars
Paste	6.9/10
Pitchfork	7.1/10

According to the review aggregator Metacritic, No Mythologies to Follow received "generally favorable reviews" based on a weighted average score of 76 out of 100 from 19 critic scores.

Renato Pagnani of Pitchfork noted that No Mythologies to Follow marks a shift from MØ's earlier shock-rap influences toward a more mature electro-pop sound, which retains immediacy while exploring themes of young adulthood. He highlighted the album's blend of Scandinavian pop, Southern rap, and modern bass music as reflective of a generation shaped by global access to diverse musical styles. The Line of Best Fit noted that No Mythologies to Follow presents a polished mix of synth-pop and dance music, characterized by emotional expression and themes often centered around youth culture. Clash noted the singer's delivery as marked by spontaneity and emotional intensity, describing the album as characterized by an eccentric yet engaging tone. Consequence highlighted No Mythologies to Follow as a polished pop album that effectively balances sharpness with MØ's unique vocal presence.

== Track listing ==
All tracks were written by Karen Marie Ørsted and produced by Vindahl; except where noted.

No Mythologies to Follow – Standard edition
No.	Title	Writer(s)	Producer(s)	Length
1.	"Fire Rides"			3:27
2.	"Maiden"			3:45
3.	"Never Wanna Know"			4:13
4.	"Red in the Grey"			3:46
5.	"Pilgrim"			3:52
6.	"Don't Wanna Dance"	Karen Ørsted; Ronni Vindahl	Vindahl; James Dring	3:15
7.	"Waste of Time"			3:35
8.	"Dust Is Gone"			3:49
9.	"XXX 88" (featuring Diplo)	Ørsted; Diplo	Vindahl; Diplo	3:41
10.	"Walk This Way"			3:42
11.	"Slow Love"			3:37
12.	"Glass"	Ørsted; Vindahl; August Fenger		3:16
Total length:				43:59

No Mythologies to Follow – Deluxe edition
No.	Title	Producer(s)	Length
13.	"No Mythologies to Follow"		3:42
14.	"Dummy Head"		3:29
15.	"The Sea"		3:39
16.	"Gone and Found"		4:56
17.	"Fire Rides" (Night Version)	Ørsted	3:28
18.	"Dust Is Gone" (Night Version)	Ørsted	4:15
19.	"Slow Love" (Night Version)	Ørsted	4:14
20.	"The Sea" (Night Version)	Ørsted	3:54
21.	"Album Track by Track" (video, iTunes Store only)		19:40
Total length:			94:50

No Mythologies to Follow – Digital deluxe (edition reissue)
No.	Title	Writer(s)	Producer(s)	Length
21.	"Pilgrim" (MS MR Remix)		Vindahl; Ørsted; Fenger	2:53
22.	"Say You'll Be There"	Spice Girls; Jonathan Buck; Eliot Kennedy	Vindahl; Ørsted; Fenger	3:52
23.	"Album Track by Track" (video on iTunes Store only)			19:40
Total length:				101:35

10th Anniversary deluxe tracks
No.	Title	Writer(s)	Producer(s)	Length
13.	"No Mythologies to Follow"			3:42
14.	"Dummy Head"			3:29
15.	"The Sea"			3:39
16.	"Gone and Found"			4:56
17.	"Say You'll Be There"	Spice Girls; Buck; Kennedy	Vindahl; Ørsted; Fenger	3:52
18.	"Fake Chanel"			3:23
19.	"Bad Luck"			3:14
20.	"Antihero"			3:18
21.	"Daydreams"			4:08
22.	"New Year's Eve"			3:49
23.	"Fire Rides" (Night Version)		Ørsted	3:28
24.	"Dust Is Gone" (Night Version)		Ørsted	4:15
25.	"Slow Love" (Night Version)		Ørsted	4:14
26.	"The Sea" (Night Version)		Ørsted	3:54
27.	"Pilgrim" (MS MR Remix)		Vindahl; Ørsted; Fenger	2:53
Total length:				105:09

== Personnel ==
Credits were adapted from the liner notes.

- Karen Marie "MØ" Ørsted – vocals, artwork design
- Anders Bast – horn (track 9)
- Signe Bergmann – artwork design
- Thomas "Diplo" Pentz – production (track 9)
- James Dring – production (track 6)
- Thomas Edinger – horn (track 9)
- August "ELOQ" Fenger – drums (track 4); mixing, production (track 12)
- Peter Hammerton – mastering (tracks 16–19)
- Stuart Hawkes – mastering (tracks 6, 10)
- Jens Høll – additional photography
- Paul Logus – mastering (tracks 1–5, 7–9, 11–15, 20)
- Michael Patterson – mastering (tracks 1–5, 7–9, 11–15, 20); mixing (tracks 1–5, 7–9, 11–20)
- Anders Schumann – mastering (track 12)
- Thomas Skou – additional photography
- Thomas Sønderup – photography
- Ronni Vindahl – executive production, mixing, production

== Charts ==
=== Weekly charts ===
No Mythologies to Follow weekly chart performance
Chart (2014)	Peak position
Australian Hitseekers Albums (ARIA)	11
Belgian Albums (Ultratop Flanders)	107
Belgian Albums (Ultratop Wallonia)	83
Danish Albums (Hitlisten)	2
French Albums (SNEP)	161
Irish Albums (IRMA)	76
UK Albums (Official Charts)	58
US Heatseekers Albums (Billboard)	11

=== Year-end charts ===
No Mythologies to Follow year-end chart performance
Chart (2014)	Position
Danish Albums (Hitlisten)	33

Chart (2015)	Position
Danish Albums (Hitlisten)	63

== Certifications ==
No Mythologies to Follow certifications
Region	Certification	Certified units/sales
Denmark (IFPI Danmark)	Platinum	20,000^{‡}
^{‡} Sales+streaming figures based on certification alone.

== Release history ==
No Mythologies to Follow release history
Region	Date	Format(s)	Edition(s)	Label	Ref.
Germany	7 March 2014	LP; digital download	Deluxe	Sony	
Ireland	7 March 2014	CD; digital download	Standard	Chess Club; RCA Victor	
Ireland	7 March 2014	LP; digital download	Deluxe	Chess Club; RCA Victor	
United Kingdom	10 March 2014	CD; digital download	Standard	Chess Club; RCA Victor	
United Kingdom	10 March 2014	LP; digital download	Deluxe	Chess Club; RCA Victor	
Denmark	10 March 2014	CD	Standard	Sony	
Denmark	10 March 2014	LP; digital download	Deluxe	Sony	
France	10 March 2014	CD; digital download	Standard	Sony	
France	10 March 2014	LP; digital download	Deluxe	Sony	
United States	11 March 2014	CD	Standard	RCA	
United States	11 March 2014	Digital download	Standard; deluxe	RCA	
Australia	14 March 2014	CD	Standard	Sony	
Australia	14 March 2014	Digital download	Standard; deluxe	Sony	
Germany	21 March 2014	CD	Standard	Sony	
Australia	18 April 2014	Digital download	Deluxe (reissue)	Sony	
Denmark	18 April 2014	Digital download	Deluxe (reissue)	Sony	
Germany	18 April 2014	Digital download	Deluxe (reissue)	Sony	
Ireland	18 April 2014	Digital download	Deluxe (reissue)	Chess Club; RCA Victor	
United Kingdom	21 April 2014	Digital download	Deluxe (reissue)	Chess Club; RCA Victor	
France	21 April 2014	Digital download	Deluxe (reissue)	Sony	
