= Walk This Way (MØ song) =

2014 song by MØ

Single by MØ

from the album No Mythologies to Follow
- Released: 3 August 2014
- Recorded: 2012/13
- Length: 3:43
- Label: Chess Club; RCA Victor
- Songwriter(s): Karen Marie Ørsted
- Producer(s): Ronni Vindahl

MØ singles chronology
"Say You'll Be There" (2014)	"Walk This Way" (2014)	"One More" (2014)

Music video
- "Walk this Way" on YouTube

"Walk This Way" is a song by Danish singer-songwriter MØ. The song was released as a digital download in Denmark on 3 August 2014 through Chess Club and RCA Victor as the second and final single from her debut studio album No Mythologies to Follow (2014). The song peaked at number 33 on the Danish Singles Chart, and was later featured in a campaign advertisement for Boohoo.com.

== Music video ==
Stereogum described the music video for "Walk This Way" as featuring MØ leading a group of stern-looking girls reminiscent of gym-class figures, performing synchronized poses across carefully composed shots. The video was directed by Emile Rafael, and was commissioned by British magazine i-D.

== Track listing ==
Digital download
No.	Title	Length
1.	"Walk This Way"	3:43
2.	"Walk This Way" (Lido Remix)	5:07
3.	"Walk This Way" (KANT Remix (Club Version))	5:13
4.	"Walk This Way" (Alle Farben Remix)	7:28

Digital download — Remixes
No.	Title	Length
1.	"Walk This Way" (Slowolf Remix)	3:00
2.	"Walk This Way" (Oscar Bandersen Remix)	4:14
3.	"Walk This Way" (Frej Le Vin Remix)	3:34

== Charts ==
Chart performance for "Walk This Way"
Chart (2014)	Peak position
Denmark (Tracklisten)	33

== Release history ==
Region	Date	Format	Label	Ref.
Denmark	3 August 2014	Digital download	Chess Club; RCA Victor	
