= Bikini Daze =

EP by MØ
- Released: 18 October 2013
- Length: 15:27
- Label: Chess Club; RCA Victor
- Producer: Diplo; Ronni Vindahl

MØ chronology
Bikini Daze (2013)	No Mythologies to Follow (2014)

Singles from Bikini Daze
- 1. "XXX 88" Released: 20 October 2013

Bikini Daze is the debut extended play by Danish singer and songwriter MØ. It was released for digital download on 18 October 2013 by Chess Club Records and RCA Victor, and officially released on 20 October 2013. The EP was made available as a digital download and as a limited-edition 10-inch vinyl.

== Background ==
MØ released her debut extended play Bikini Daze on October 20 through Chess Club and RCA Victor. Leading up to the release, she shared the Diplo-produced track "XXX 88" in September, followed by "Never Wanna Know" as a preview.

== Critical reception ==
Professional ratings
Aggregate scores
Source	Rating
Metacritic	84/100
Review scores
Source	Rating
DIY	4/5 stars
The Line of Best Fit	8/10
NME	8/10

Bikini Daze received generally favorable reviews from critics. DIY magazine described the EP as presenting "a tale of two sides," with its sequencing emphasizing contrast while showcasing MØ's willingness to challenge pop conventions. The review noted that the project reflects a well-formed artistic identity, suggesting that MØ has defined her creative direction while leaving room for future exploration.

The Line of Best Fit observed that the second half of the EP leans into more experimental balladry, drawing comparisons to the style of Lana Del Rey. Tracks like "Never Wanna Know" and "Freedom (#1)" were noted for their retro influences, including doo-wop backing vocals, gospel keys, and soulful arrangements. The review praised Ørsted's vocal delivery and emotional intensity, calling the EP "an excellent portfolio" that highlights the breadth of her musical capabilities.

== Track listing ==
All lyrics were written by Karen Marie Ørsted. All music were composed by Ronni Vindahl and Ørsted, except "XXX 88" by Diplo, Vindahl and Ørsted. All tracks were produced by Vindahl, except "XXX 88" by Diplo and Vindahl.

Bikini Daze track listing
No.	Title	Length
1.	"XXX 88" (featuring Diplo)	3:41
2.	"Never Wanna Know"	4:13
3.	"Dark Night"	3:22
4.	"Freedom (#1)"	4:09
Total length:		15:26

== Charts ==
Chart performance for Bikini Daze
Chart (2014)	Peak position
US Top Heatseekers Albums (Billboard)	11

== Release history ==
Release dates and formats for Bikini Daze
Region	Date	Format	Label	Ref.
Various	18 October 2013	Digital download	Chess Club; RCA Victor	
United Kingdom	21 October 2013	10-inch vinyl	Chess Club	
