= Pilgrim (MØ song) =

Single by MØ
- B-side: "Pilgrim (MS MR Remix)"
- Released: 15 March 2013
- Recorded: 2012
- Length: 3:51
- Label: Chess Club; RCA Victor; Neon Gold (7")
- Songwriter(s): Karen Marie Ørsted, Ronni Vindahl
- Producer(s): Ronni Vindahl

MØ singles chronology
"Glass" (2013)	"Pilgrim" (2013)	"Waste of Time" (2013)

Audio video
- "Pilgrim" on YouTube

"Pilgrim" is a song by Danish singer-songwriter MØ. The song was released as a digital download in Denmark on 15 March 2013 through Chess Club and RCA Victor. "Pilgrim" was included in her debut studio album No Mythologies to Follow (2014). A 7" vinyl single of the song was released on February 25, 2013 by Neon Gold Records. The song was featured as a score in the Italian version of an advertisement for Armani's fragrance Acqua di Gioia. The song has peaked at number 11 on the Danish Singles Chart.

== MSMR Remix ==
The official video for the MS MR remix of the song was directed by Esben Weile Kjær. MØ has performed the song live several times. Performances include Glastonbury Festival, for Vogue, at P3 Guld Denmark 2013, and for PerezHilton.com.

== Track listing ==
Digital download
No.	Title	Length
1.	"Pilgrim"	3:51

7-inch single
No.	Title	Length
1.	"Pilgrim"	3:51
2.	"Pilgrim (MS MR Remix)"	2:53

== Charts ==
Chart performance for "Pilgrim"
Chart (2013)	Peak position
Denmark (Tracklisten)	11

== Certifications ==
Region	Certification	Certified units/sales
Denmark (IFPI Danmark)	Platinum	1,800,000^{†}
^{†} Streaming-only figures based on certification alone.

== Release history ==
Region	Date	Format	Label	Ref.
United Kingdom	25 February 2013	7" vinyl	Neon Gold Records	
Denmark	15 March 2013	Digital download	Chess Club; RCA Victor	
