= When Saints Go Machine =

Danish electropop band

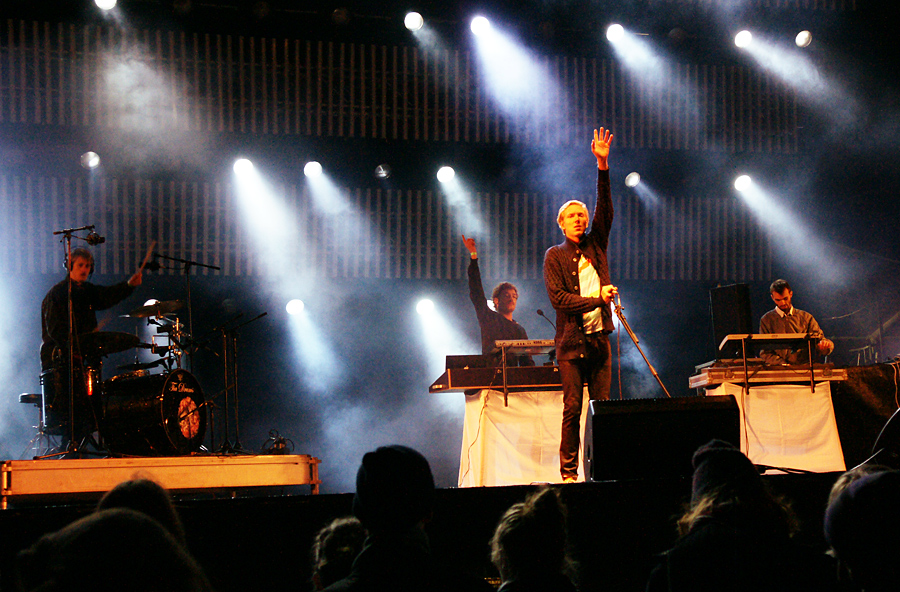
- When Saints Go Machine in concert October 2009

Background information
- Genres: Electropop
- Years active: 2007–present
- Members: Nikolaj Manuel Vonsild; Jonas Kenton; Silas Moldenhawer
- Past members: Simon Muschinsky

When Saints Go Machine is a Danish electropop band from Copenhagen. The group consists of three members: Silas Moldenhawer (drums), Jonas Kenton (synth, vocals) and Nikolaj Manuel Vonsild (vocals). Until February 2019, there was a fourth member, Simon Muschinsky (keys). Moldenhawer and Kenton are also known from their parallel project, Kenton Slash Demon. When Saints Go Machine brings a more soulful sound than Kenton Slash Demon's rhythmic electro-house music. When Saints Go Machine was formed in 2007 and debuted with their self-titled EP in 2008. In May 2009, they released their debut album Ten Makes a Face. Their most popular songs are "Fail Forever", "You or the Gang" and "Kids on Vacation".

In 2008, the band participated in DR P3's P3 Gold contest, being awarded the title "P3 Talent". One year later, they were awarded the top prize, the P3 Award, which came with a kr 100,000 prize.

In 2010, they opened the Orange Stage at Roskilde Festival.

The band signed a contract with the German record label K7 Records in October 2010 for releases outside of Scandinavia.

On 16 May 2011, the band released their second studio album, Konkylie. The album's popular hit came with the single release "Kelly" while tracks like "Church and Law" and "Add Ends" have been the critics' favorites. The album has been well-received by critics both in Denmark and abroad. At the 2012 Steppeulv Awards, When Saints Go Machine was awarded the prize for Best Producer.

On February 14, 2019, Simon Muschinsky announced on Facebook he was leaving the band.

== Discography ==
=== Albums ===
Year	Album	Peak chart positions
Year	Album	DEN
2008	Ten Makes a Face	34
2011	Konkylie	2
2013	Infinity Pool	5
2019	So Deep	—
2021	Emotional	—
2023	Rosy	19
