= Širom =

Slovenian musical group

- Years active: 2015–present
- Labels: Klopotec / ZARŠ tak:til / Glitterbeat
- Members: Samo Kutin; Iztok Koren; Ana Kravanja

Širom is a Slovenian trio formed in 2015, consisting of Iztok Koren (banjo, bass drum, chimes, balafon), Ana Kravanja (violin, viola, ribab, kalimba, bendir, balafon) and Samo Kutin (ukulele, kalimba, tamburica, harps, balafon, sound objects).

Members of the trio come from Prekmurje, the Tolmin area, and the Karst Plateau. Their work is noted for its fusion of polyphony and psychedelic music with folk, classical and improvisational elements. Their first album was released in 2016.

Their song 'Trilogija' was 'Song of the Day' on KEXP Radio from Seattle in March, 2017.

The band released the second album I Can Be a Clay Snapper on September 8, 2017 on German label tak:til.

== Discography ==
- 2016 : I. (Klopotec / ZARŠ)
- 2017 : I Can Be a Clay Snapper (tak:til / Glitterbeat)
- 2019 : A Universe that Roasts Blossoms for a Horse
- 2022 : The Liquified Throne of Simplicity
- 2025 : In the Wind of Night, Hard-Fallen Incantations Whisper
