= Veto (band) =

Danish indie rock band

VETO
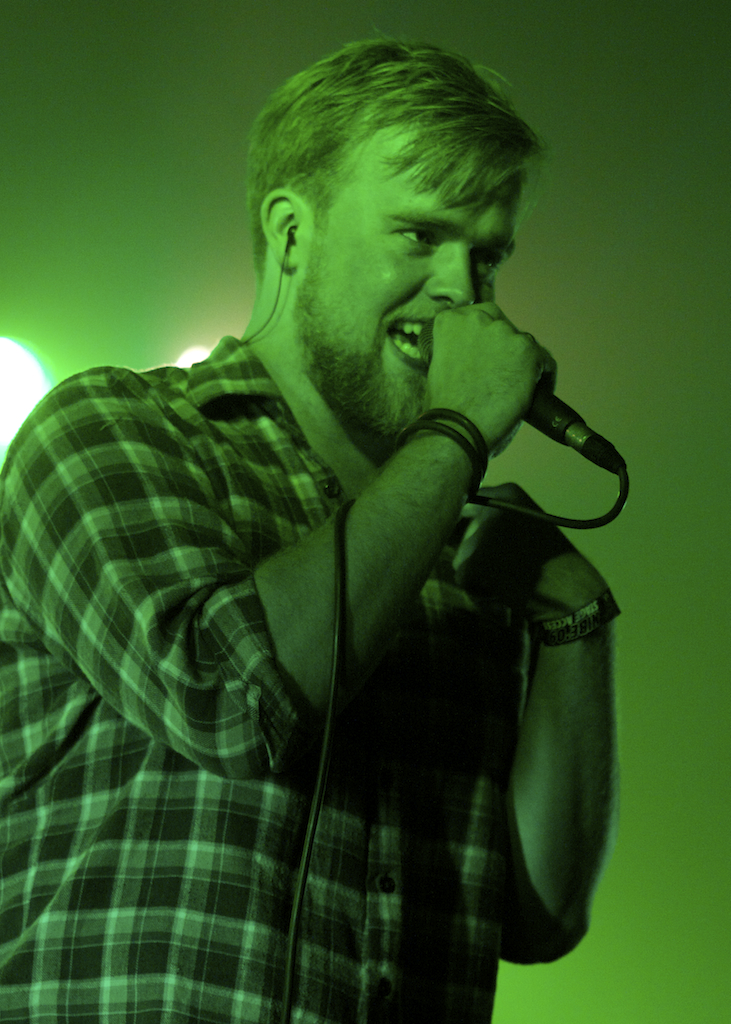
- Troels Abrahamsen, lead singer.

Background information
- Origin: Århus, Denmark
- Genres: Indie rock, electronic rock, alternative rock
- Years active: 2004-present
- Labels: Tabu Records/Playground Music Denmark; Reset08/Sony BMG
- Members: Troels Abrahamsen; David Krogh Andersen; Mark Lee; Jens Skov Thomsen; Mads Hasager
- Website: www.vetonet.dk

VETO is a Danish indie rock band formed in 2004. They released their first EP, I Will Not Listen, in 2005 and their first album, There's A Beat In All Machines, in 2006, both released on the Danish hip hop label, Tabu Records/Playground Music Denmark.

In February 2007, VETO won the award for Best New Act, as well as Best Danish Music Video at Danish Music Awards.

Their song "You Are A Knife" was featured briefly in the American television program NCIS episode "Suspicion".

VETO's second album is called Crushing Digits and was released 5 May 2008. The first single for the album, "Built to Fail", was released in March 2008 and received heavy airplay as "Ugens Uundgåelige" (Unavoidable of the week) on the public service radio channel DR P3.

The band was awarded Danish Band of the Year at the Danish Music Awards 2009.

The band's third studio album, entitled Everything is Amplified, was released on February 25, 2011.

== Discography ==
=== Albums ===
Title and details	Year	Peak position	Certification
Title and details	Year	DAN	Certification
There's a Beat in All Machines: Release date: February 27, 2006; Record label: Tabu Records /Playground Music	2006	21	
Crushing Digits: Release date: May 5, 2008; Record label: Reset08/Sony BMG	2008	2	
Everything Is Amplified: Release date: February 25, 2011; Record label: RCA / Sony Music Entertainment Denmark	2011	2	
Point Break: Release date: 2013; Record label: Sony Music	2013	6	
16 Colors: Release date: 2018; Record label: Reset08	2018		

EP / Others

- 2005: I Will Not Listen EP [Tabu Records /Playground Music] (Released August 28, 2005)
- 2012: Sinus / Point Break (double CD special edition with CD 1 Sinus (6 tracks) / CD 2: Point Break (6 tracks) [Columbia / Sony Music]

=== Singles ===
Year	Song	Peak position	Certification	Album
Year	Song	DAN	Certification	Album
2008	"Built to Fail"	26		Crushing Digits
2008	"You Say Yes, I Say Yes"	34		Crushing Digits
2009	"Blackout"	33		Crushing Digits
2011	"This Is Not"	8		Everything Is Amplified

== Members ==
- Troels Abrahamsen – Vocals, synth
- David Krogh Andersen – Guitar
- Mark Lee – Guitar, synth
- Jens Skov Thomsen – Bass guitar, backing vocals
- Mads Hasager – Drums
