= The Minds of 99 =

Danish post-punk band

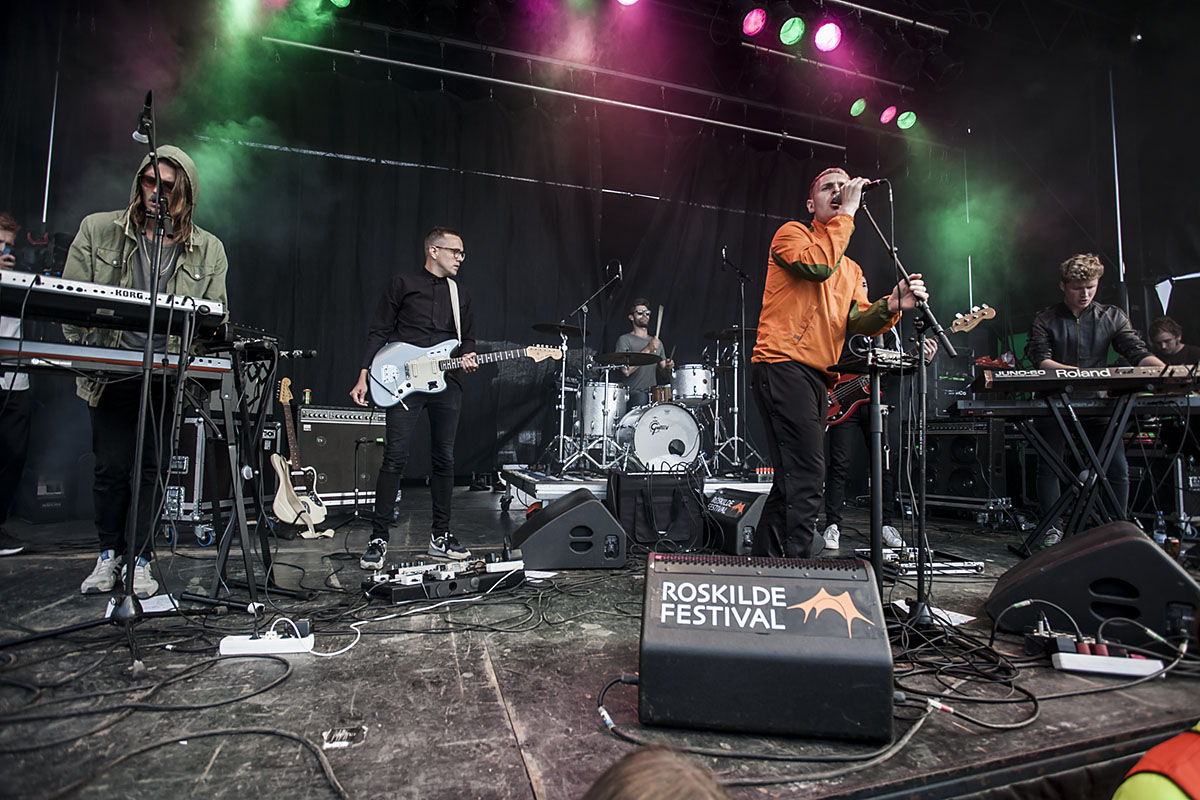
- The Minds of 99 at Roskilde Festival 2014

Background information
- Origin: Copenhagen
- Genres: Post-punk, rock, new wave
- Years active: 2012–present
- Label: No3
- Members: Niels Brandt (vocals); Anders Folke Larsen (guitar); Asger Wissing (bass); Jacob Bech-Hansen (synthesizers, editing); Louis Clausen (drums)
- Website: The Minds of 99

The Minds of 99 is a Danish post punk band, formed in 2012. The band is known for mixing post punk and new wave styles of the 1980s with more modern pop rock. The group mostly performs in Danish. Having released four studio albums to critical and commercial success, The Minds of 99 is one of the most popular contemporary Danish rock groups, with a large and devoted fan base.

They were the opening act at Roskilde Festival 2015, and have sold out several arena shows since then, most notably Parken in Copenhagen in 2021, and again in 2024.

== Background ==
The band, consisting of five childhood friends, won DR's Karrierrekanonen in 2013. The first single, "Det er Knud som er død", from their debut album, is based on a poem by the Danish journalist and writer Tom Kristensen about the Danish scientist and national hero Knud Rasmussen. The song reached first place on the alternative radio hitlist Det Elektriske Barometer and was in heavy rotation on Danish radio February 2014.

== Discography ==
=== Albums ===
- The Minds of 99 (2014)
- Liber (2015)
- Solkongen (2018)
- Infinity Action (2022)

=== Singles ===
- "Det er Knud som er død" (2014)
- "Et barn af min tid" (2014)
- "Hurtige hænder" (2014)
- "Rav" (2014)
- "Stjerner På Himlen" (2015)
- "Ma Cherie Bon Bon" (2015)
- "Hjertet følger med" (2016)
- "I'm Gonna Die" (2017)
- "Alle skuffer over tid" (2018)
- "1,2,3,4" (2019)
- "Som Fluer" (2019)
- "Big City, Bright Lights" (2020)
- "En Stemme" (2020)
- "Under Din Sne" (2021)
- "Dét Der Udenfor" (2026)
- "9mm" (2026)

== Awards ==
In relation to their critically acclaimed debut album from May 2014, the band received numerous awards. Among others, the band won at the 2015 Årets Steppeulv for Song of the Year ("Det er Knud som er død"), as well as at the 2015 Carl Prisen for both Talent of the Year and Best Rock Songwriters of the Year. The band garnered a number of nominations as well at both Danish Music Awards (Danish Group of the Year, Best New Danish Act, Best Rock Publication), GAFFA-prisen (Best New Danish Act, Best Rock Publication) and Zulu Awards (Best New Danish Act).
