= Ronni Vindahl =

Danish music producer, composer and musician

Ronni Vindahl is a Danish music producer, composer, re-mixer and musician. He is co-founder of the Copenhagen-based music collective Boom Clap Bachelors, and has worked with artists such as MØ, Avicii, and Kendrick Lamar. Vindahl occasionally also writes and records under his own name, and released his first solo album in 2012. He is Grammy Awards-nominated.

== Biography ==
Ronni began playing guitar at the age of 12, and started producing at 18. It was also around that time that he co-founded the Copenhagen-based music collective Boom Clap Bachelors together with Robin Hannibal. Their track, Tiden Flyver, later got sampled by Kendrick Lamar on his track "Bitch Don't Kill My Vibe".

Vindahl's first international appearance was in 2008, when Gilles Peterson released the Boom Clap Bachelor's track "Combiner" – produced, co- written and performed by Vindahl – on his compilation Brownswood Bubblers. vol. 2 on Gilles Peterson's own record label Brownswood. Peterson also put "Combinér" in rotation on his weekly radio show on BBC1, which gave Vindahl the exposure needed to take his career to the next level.

Upon meeting her in 2012, Vindahl started working with MØ, and solely produced and co-wrote her EP Bikini Daze the same year. The Line of Best Fit praised the EP, giving it an 8/10 score and calling it "sensational".

The collaboration with MØ continued on her debut album, No Mythologies to Follow, which was released in 2014. The album, which was co-written, produced and also executively produced by Vindahl, was well received by music critics and won two Danish Gaffa Awards for best pop album and Hit of the year. Between 2012 and 2014 Vindahl also toured with MØ, playing live guitar.

In 2011, Vindahl released the first album under his own name, entitled Serendipity. The title refers to term used in science use to describe when one finds something that wasn't intended. Alan Brown at Soul Seduction praised the album, calling it "Drop dead gorgeous like the most beautiful girl you've ever met!".

In 2015, Vindahl won a Danish Critics Award as best writer, and was also nominated in the best producer-category. The same year, he also won two Danish Writer's Awards for both best pop writer as well as international breakthrough.

In 2017 Vindahl launched the record label Beachy Records - a vanity label on Sony Music - where he functions as label manager and A&R manager.

== Discography ==
Artist	Release	Record label	Credit	Year
Nobody Beats The Beats	"Drops From Above" (Track)	Universal Music	Producer, writer	2005
Boom Clap Bachelors	LP (Album)	Self Released	Producer, writer, artist	2005
Outlandish	Angles lower their wings (single)	RCA	Producer, writer	2006
Boom Clap Bachelors	"Kort Før Dine Læber" (Album)	Music for Dreams	Producer, writer, artist	2008
Non+	Sound of Chance (Album)	EMI	Producer, writer, artist	2009
Boom Clap Bachelors	"Mellem dine Læber" (EP)	Plug Research	Producer, writer, artist	2011
Kris Mars	"The Traveler" (EP)	Self Released	Producer, writer	2011
Ivory&Gold	"I" (EP)	Universal Music	Producer, writer, artist	2011
Vindahl	"Serendipity" (Album)	Playground Music / Tokyo Dawn Records	Producer, writer, artist	2011
Kendrick Lamar	"Bitch Don't Kill My Vibe" (Single)	Interscope	Writer	2012
Kendrick Lamar feat. Emile Sandé	"Bitch Don't Kill My Vibe" (Single Remix)	Interscope	Writer	2012
Kendrick Lamar feat. Jay Z	"Bitch Don't Kill My Vibe" (Single Remix)	Interscope	Writer	2012
Logic (rapper)	"Addiction" (Single)	Dej Jam	Writer	2012
Ivory&Gold	"Burst" (Album)	A:larm	Producer, writer, artist	2013
MØ	"Bikini Daze" (EP)	Chess Club Records / RCA Victor	Producer, writer	2013
Avicii	"Dear Boy"	Universal Island	Co-writer	2013
MØ	"No Mythologies To Follow" (Album)	Chess Club Records / RCA Victor	Executive producer, producer, writer	2014
MØ	"Say You'll Be There" (Single)	Chess Club Records / RCA Victor	Re-mixer, producer	2014
For Akia	"Recognizer" (Single)	Sony Music	Producer	2015
XOV	"Lucifer" (Single)	Sony Music	Re-mixer	2015
ANYA	"BreakUP Battle" (Single)	Sony Music	Producer, co-writer	2016
Scarlet Pleasure	"Blow"	Copenhagen Records	Producer, co-writer.	2016
MØ	"New Year's Eve" (Single)	Chess Club Records / RCA Victor	Co-producer, arranger, mixer	2016
CASI	"Lion" (Single)	Chess Club Records / Roc Nation	Producer, co-writer	2016
Lulu James	"It's the time" (Single)	White	Producer, co-writer	2016
Una Sand	"Wanderlust" (Single)	Universal	Producer, co-writer	2017
Emma Haga	"Nosebleed" (Single)	Starbox/Sony Music	Producer	2017
MØ	"When I Was Young" (Single)	Chess Club Records / RCA Victor	Writer	2017
Lazy Weekends	"Caught Up" (Single)	Beachy Records / Sony Music	Writer, co-producer	2018
Springer	"Wanna Go" (Single)	Beachy Records / Sony Music	Writer, producer	2018
Springer	"Am I" (Single)	Beachy Records / Sony Music	Writer, producer	2019
Neigh	"CmeCry" (Single)	Beachy Records / Sony Music	Writer, producer	2019
Alessandra	"Hollywood" (EP track)	KUMLA Music	Writer	2019
NIIA	"Pull Up" (Single)	Atlantic Records	Co-writer	2019
Elias Boussnina	"Come Alive" (Single)	Universal Music	Producer, co-writer	2020
Neigh	"Maybe" (Single)	Beachy Records / Sony Music	Producer, co-writer	2020
Neigh	"Summer" (Single)	Beachy Records / Sony Music	Producer, co-writer	2020
Springer	"Protection" (Single)	Beachy Records / Sony Music	Producer, co-writer	2020
Springer	"Feels Like" (Single)	Beachy Records / Sony Music	Producer, co-writer	2020
Høker	"Ud af Dig" (Single)	Sony Music	Co-producer	2020
Høker	"Storskærm" (Single)	Sony Music	Co-producer	2020
Springer	"Tell Me" (Single)	Beachy Records / Sony Music	Producer, co-writer	2020
Springer	"Rosie" (Single)	Beachy Records / Sony Music	Producer, co-writer	2020
Høker	"James Dean" (Single)	Sony Music	Co-producer	2021
Høker	"Plastiliv" (Album)	Sony Music	Co-producer	2021
The Minds of 99	Under Din Sne" (single)	No3 / Sony Music	Co-producer	2021
MØ	Brad Pitt" (single)	RCA Victor	Co-writer	2021
MØ	Motordrome Album	RCA Victor	Producer, co-writer	2022
Skott	Evergreen" (single)	Cosmos	Producer, co-writer	2022
Kesi	Hele Natten (single)	Universal	Co-writer	2022
pinkiscool	Meant to Be (single)	Sony Music	Producer, co-writer	2022
The Minds of 99	Infinity Action (EP)	No3 / Sony Music	Producer, arranger	2023
The Minds of 99	Og Du Blev Til En Hvid Fugl (single)	No3 / Sony Music	Producer, arranger	2023
MØ	Fake Chanel (single)	RCA Victor	Producer, co-writer	2024
MØ	Bad Luckl (single)	RCA Victor	Producer, co-writer	2024
MØ	No Mythologies To follow Anniversary Edition (album)	RCA Victor	Producer, co-writer, arranger, mixer.	2024
Thea Dora	Enter (EP)	Tricksy	Producer, co-writer, arranger, mixer.	2024
Selma Higgins	Summertime (single)	No3 / Sony Music	Producer, co-writer	2024
Lil Tecca	Taste (single)	Galactic Records / Republic Records	writer, co-producer	2024
Patina	Krystalklart Kaos (single)	No3 / Sony Music	Producer, co-writer	2025
MØ	Who Said (single)	RCA Victor / Sony Music	writer, co-producer	2024
Thea Dora	New Beginnings (single)	Tricksy / Beachy Records	writer, producer	2025
MØ	Lose Yourself	RCA Victor / Sony Music	co-producer, co-writer	2025
MØ	Lose Yourself	RCA Victor / Sony Music	co-producer, co-writer	2025
MØ	Plægirl (album)	RCA Victor / Sony Music	co-producer, co-writer	2025
KAOS (TV show)	Full Score	Drive Entertainment	composer, producer	2025
MØ	Hunnybån (single)	MØ / Sony Music	co-producer, writer	2026

== Awards and nominations ==
2012

- Bet Hiphop Awards – Album of the Year (Kendrick Lamar – Good Kid M.A.A.D City) Writer

2013

- American Music Awards – Favourite Rap/Hip Hop Album (Kendrick Lamar – Good Kid M.A.A.D City) Writer

2014

- Danish Music Award – Producer of the Year
- Danish Music Award – Writer of the Year
- Danish Music Award – Album of the Year (MØ – No Mythologies to Follow) (Won)
- Grammy Awards – Album of the Year (Kendrick Lamar – Good Kid M.A.A.D City) Writer
- BMI Awards – Song of the Year (Kendrick Lamar – "Bitch Don't Kill My Vibe") Writer (Won)

2015

- Danish Critics Award "Steppeulven" – Song of the Year (MØ – Don't Wanna Dance)
- Danish Critics Award "Steppeulven" – Writer of the Year (Won)
- Danish Critics Award "Steppeulven" – Producer of the Year
- Danish Critics Award "Steppeulven" – Album of the Year (MØ – No Mythologies to Follow) (Won)
- Danish Writers Award "Carl-prisen" – Writer of the Year POP (Won)
- Danish Writers Award "Carl-prisen" – International Break through (Won)
