= Snakehips discography =

This is the discography for British electronic duo Snakehips.

== Studio albums ==
Title	Details
Never Worry	Released: 5 May 2023; Label: Helix Records, Payday Records; Format: Digital download, streaming

== Extended plays ==
Title	Details
Hoffman West e.p.	Released: 2011; Format: Digital download
Forever, Pt. II	Released: 10 March 2015; Label: Sony; Format: Digital download
Money on Me	Released: 15 April 2016; Label: Sony; Format: Digital download
All My Friends	Released: 15 April 2016; Label: Sony; Format: Digital download
Stay Home Tapes (= --__-- =)	Released: 6 April 2018; Label: Sony; Format: Digital download
Couple Bandz	Released: 18 March 2022; Label: Never Worry; Format: Digital download
All I Ever	Released: 10 February 2023; Label: Never Worry; Format: Digital download
Snakegang, Volume 1 (with Earthgang)	Released: 19 July 2024; Label: Never Worry; Format: Digital download

== Singles ==
=== As lead artist ===
Title	Year	Peak chart positions						Certification	Album
Title	Year	UK	AUS	BEL (FL)	IRE	NZ	US Dance	Certification	Album
"Days with You" (featuring Sinéad Harnett)	2014	—	—	—	—	—	—		Non-album single
"All My Friends" (featuring Tinashe and Chance the Rapper)	2015	5	3	25	15	2	—	BPI: 2× Platinum; ARIA: 3× Platinum; RIAA: Platinum; RMNZ: 5× Platinum	All My Friends
"Money on Me" (featuring Anderson Paak)	2016	—	—	—	—	—	—		Money on Me
"Cruel" (featuring Zayn)	2016	33	34	74	55	31	17	BPI: Silver; ARIA: Gold; RMNZ: Platinum	Non-album singles
"Burn Break Crash" (with Aanysa)	2016	—	—	—	—	—	35		Non-album singles
"Don't Leave" (with MØ)	2017	27	11	—	23	16	—	BPI: Gold; ARIA: 2× Platinum; RIAA: Platinum; RMNZ: 2× Platinum	Non-album singles
"Right Now" (featuring Elhae, DRAM and H.E.R.)	2017	—	—	—	—	—	—		Non-album singles
"Either Way" (with Anne-Marie featuring Joey Badass)	2017	47	64	—	—	— (Note: "Either Way" did not enter the NZ Top 40 Singles Chart, but peaked at number four on the NZ Heatseekers Singles Chart.)	—	BPI: Silver; RMNZ: Gold	Non-album singles
"Cruzin'" (featuring St Rulez)	2018	—	—	—	—	—	45		Stay Home Tapes (= --__-- =)
"For the F^_^k of It" (featuring Jeremih and Aminé)	2018	—	—	—	—	— (Note: "For the F^_^ of It" did not enter the NZ Top 40 Singles Chart, but peaked at number 10 on the NZ Heatseeker Singles Chart.)	—		Stay Home Tapes (= --__-- =)
"Gucci Rock n Rolla" (featuring Rivers Cuomo and Kyle)	2019	—	—	—	—	— (Note: "Gucci Rock n Rolla" did not enter the NZ Top 40 Singles Chart, but peaked at number 33 on the NZ Hot Singles Chart.)	—		Non-album singles
"Summer Fade" (featuring Anna of the North)	2019	—	—	—	—	—	—		Non-album singles
"Wavez" (with Troyboi)	2020	—	—	—	—	—	—		Non-album singles
"Lie for You" (featuring Jess Glynne, Davido and A Boogie wit da Hoodie)	2020	—	—	—	—	—	—		Non-album singles
"Run It Up" (with EarthGang)	2021	—	—	—	—	—	—		Non-album singles
"Freedom (You Bring Me)" (with Armand van Helden)	2021	—	—	—	—	—	—		Non-album singles
"All Over U"	2021	—	—	—	—	—	—		Non-album singles
"Tonight" (with Tchami)	2022	—	—	—	—	—	—		Non-album singles
"Water" (with Bryce Vine)	2022	—	—	—	—	—	50		Never Worry
"Who's Gonna Love You Tonight" (with Tinashe)	2022	—	—	—	—	—	—		Never Worry
"Solitude" (with BIA and Lucky Daye)	2022	—	—	—	—	—	—		Never Worry
"Show Me the Money" (with Tkay Maidza)	2023	—	—	—	—	—	—		Never Worry
"Sometimes..." (with Daya and EarthGang)	2023	—	—	—	—	—	37		Never Worry
"My Body // Your Body" (with Muni Long)	2023	—	—	—	—	—	—		Never Worry (Deluxe)
"Bringing Me Home" (with Laurel)	2023	—	—	—	—	—	—		Non-album single
"Been a Minute" (with EarthGang)	2024	—	—	—	—	—	—		SnakeGang, Volume 1
"Lose Control" (with Kiinjo)	2025	—	—	—	—	—	—		TBA
"Pipe Down" (with DijahSB)	2025	—	—	—	—	—	—		TBA
"Plz Hold" (with Austin Millz and Tkay Maidza)	2026	—	—	—	—	—	—		TBA
"—" denotes a single that did not chart or was not released.

=== As featured artist ===
Title	Year	Album
"Never Gonna Like You" (Bea Miller featuring Snakehips)	2019	Lust

=== Remixes ===
- 2019: Ellie Goulding and Juice Wrld – "Hate Me" (Snakehips Remix)
- 2020: Illenium featuring Bahari – "Crashing" (Snakehips Remix)
- 2020: The Aces – "Daydream" (Snakehips Remix)
- 2020: Elohim – "Good Day Bad Day" (Snakehips Remix)
- 2020: Gorgon City featuring Evan Giia – "Burning" (Snakehips Remix)
- 2023: Taylor Swift – "Lavender Haze" (Snakehips Remix)
