= Heatseekers charts =

Billboard music charts

The Heatseekers charts were "Breaking and Entering" music charts issued weekly by Billboard magazine. The Heatseekers Albums and the Heatseekers Songs charts were introduced by Billboard in 1991 with the purpose of highlighting the sales by new and developing musical recording artists. Albums and songs appearing on the Top Heatseekers charts could also concurrently appear on the Billboard 200 or Billboard Hot 100.

Although the Billboard Heatseekers Songs chart was discontinued in December 2014, some regional editions (such as Billboard Japan) still host their own Heatseekers Songs charts. The Heatseekers Albums chart was discontinued in January 2025.

== Albums chart ==
The Heatseekers Albums chart contains 25 positions that are ranked by Nielsen SoundScan sales data, and charts album titles from "new or developing acts" as determined by the acts' historical chart performance (the chart occasionally expanded to 50 positions throughout the years as well). Once an artist/act has had an album place in the top 100 of the Billboard Top 200, or in the top 10 of any of the Top R&B/Hip-Hop Albums, Country Albums, Latin Albums, Christian Albums, or Gospel Albums charts, the album and later works no longer qualify for tracking on Heatseeker Albums. The chart was discontinued on January 14, 2025, and all previous charting history was scrubbed from the site; the last appearance was on the date January 11, 2025, with the number-one Lola Young's This Wasn't Meant for You Anyway.

== Songs chart ==
The Heatseekers Songs chart contains 25 positions, rated by a combination of Nielsen BDS airplay measurements, Nielsen SoundScan sales data, and streaming activity figures from online music sources. Like Heatseekers Albums, this chart tracks titles from "new or developing acts", similarly determined by the acts' historical chart performance. An artist's song is no longer eligible for Heatseekers Songs when the artist has had a song place in the top 50 of the Billboard Hot 100 (or has had a radio song before December 5, 1998).

The Heatseekers Songs chart was quietly discontinued on December 6, 2014; the final chart was released on November 29, 2014, and the final number-one song on the chart was "Girl in a Country Song" by Maddie & Tae.

== See also ==
- Emerging Artists
- Billboard charts
- Bubbling Under Hot 100
