= I'm Only F**king Myself =

Studio album by Lola Young
- Released: 19 September 2025
- Length: 46:35
- Labels: Day One; Island
- Producers: Carter Lang; Lola Young; Manuka; Solomonophonic

Lola Young chronology
This Wasn't Meant for You Anyway (2024)	I'm Only F**king Myself (2025)

Singles from I'm Only F**king Myself
- 1. "One Thing" Released: 16 May 2025; 2. "Not Like That Anymore" Released: 20 June 2025; 3. "Dealer" Released: 25 July 2025; 4. "Spiders" Released: 5 September 2025

I'm Only F**king Myself is the third studio album by English singer and songwriter Lola Young. It was released on 19 September 2025 through Day One and Island Records, and was preceded by the release of the singles "One Thing", "Not Like That Anymore", "Dealer", and "Spiders".

Upon its release, the album charted at No. 3 on the UK Albums Chart and received positive reviews from music critics. A planned deluxe version and tour were cancelled following Young collapsing mid-concert shortly after the album's release.

== Background and release ==
I'm Only F**king Myself is Young's third album following My Mind Wanders and Sometimes Leaves Completely (2023) and This Wasn't Meant for You Anyway (2024). The latter featured her breakthrough single "Messy", which topped the UK singles chart. Promotion for that album was interrupted by Young requiring a spell in rehab following a cocaine relapse. In May 2025, she released the lead single "One Thing", a song about only wanting casual sex from men. It peaked at No. 19 on the UK singles chart following its release. The song's music video was later nominated for Best Pop Video at the 2025 UK Music Video Awards.

Young announced I'm Only F**king Myself in June 2025. That month, she released the single "Not Like That Anymore", which she had written in New York City the day she stopped using drugs. The following month, she released the single "Dealer", a farewell address to her drug dealer. Elton John praised the song when she appeared on his Rocket Hour podcast and bet a house that it would top the UK singles chart, only to lose it after it peaked at No. 27 instead. A further and last single, "Spiders", also made it onto the UK charts.

Young released I'm Only F**king Myself on 19 September through Island Records. The album discussed the many ways she abused herself including rumination, whirlwind romances, cocaine addiction and the sex she was using to replace the highs after withdrawing, and her use of her dildo and her ex-boyfriend; Samuele Vilori of Billboard Italia summed these up as "all the ways she fucks herself". I'm Only F**king Myself also discussed her bisexuality and her struggles with schizoaffective disorder and attention deficit hyperactivity disorder. A deluxe version of the album and a tour visiting the UK and North America in late 2025, and South America and Europe in 2026, were planned to promote the album, though these were all shelved after Young cancelled all public activity following her collapsing mid-concert in New York, shortly after the album's release.

== Artwork ==
The album cover of I'm Only F**king Myself features Young posing with a pink blow-up sex doll of herself wearing a baby bonnet and a jester's collar.

It was criticised by Exclaim! who named it "one of the worst of 2025."

== Critical reception ==
Professional ratings
Aggregate scores
Source	Rating
Metacritic	78/100
Review scores
Source	Rating
AllMusic	4/5 stars
Clash	7/10
Dork	4/5
The Independent	4/5 stars
The Line of Best Fit	7/10
NME	3/5 stars
Paste	7/10
Pitchfork	7.2/10
Rolling Stone	4/5 stars
The Standard	4/5 stars

According to the review aggregator Metacritic, I'm Only F**king Myself received "generally favorable reviews" based on a weighted average score of 78 out of 100 from 9 critic scores.

== Commercial performance ==
The album was promoted with the focus track "Post Sex Clarity"; the pair charted at numbers 3 and 60 on the UK singles chart and the UK Albums Chart respectively.

== Track listing ==
I'm Only F**king Myself track listing
No.	Title	Writer(s)	Producer(s)	Length
1.	"How Long Will It Take to Walk a Mile? (Interlude)"			0:36
2.	"F**k Everyone"	Lola Young; Conor Dickinson; William Brown; Jared Solomon	Solomonophonic; Manuka	3:23
3.	"One Thing"	Young; Carter Lang; Solomon; Dickinson; William Brown	Solomonophonic; Lang; Manuka	3:28
4.	"Dealer"	Young; Brown; Solomon	Solomonophonic; Manuka	2:40
5.	"Spiders"	Young; Solomon; Dickinson	Solomonophonic; Manuka	4:28
6.	"Penny Out of Nothing"	Young; Solomon; Brown	Solomonophonic; Manuka	4:01
7.	"Walk All Over You"	Young	Lang; Solomonophonic; Manuka	3:04
8.	"Post Sex Clarity"	Young; Brown; Dickinson; Lang; Solomon	Lang; Solomonophonic; Manuka	4:22
9.	"Sad Sob Story! :)"	Young	Solomonophonic; Manuka	4:03
10.	"Can We Ignore It? :("	Young; Solomon; Brown; Dickinson	Solomonophonic; Manuka	4:34
11.	"Why Do I Feel Better When I Hurt You?"	Young; Solomon; Dickinson; Brown; Adrien Simon	Solomonophonic; Manuka	3:47
12.	"Not Like That Anymore"	Young; Solomon; Dickinson; Brown; Lang	Lang; Solomonophonic; Manuka	3:22
13.	"Who F**king Cares?"	Young	Young	3:23
14.	"Ur an Absolute C Word (Interlude)"			1:23
Total length:				46:35

=== Note ===
- A bonus track titled "Blisters" appears on certain vinyl pressings of the album.
- "Dealer" is stylised "d£aler".
- "How Long Will It Take to Walk a Mile?", "Dealer", "Why Do I Feel Better When I Hurt You?", "Who F**king Cares?" and "Ur an Absolute C Word" are stylised in lower case.
- "F**k Everyone", "Spiders", "Sad Sob Story! :)" and "Can We Ignore It? :(" are stylised in all caps.

== Personnel ==
Credits adapted from Tidal.

=== Musicians ===
- Lola Young – programming (1), vocals (2–13), guitar (13), spoken word (14)
- Mandisa Apena – spoken word (1)
- William Brown – drums (2, 5, 6, 8, 12), bass synthesiser (2, 5), synthesiser (3, 6), keyboards (3), pump organ (4, 7, 11), piano (6, 12), organ (7–9), percussion (7, 8), Rhodes (7), guitar (9, 10), piano (9), bass (11)
- Jared Solomon – guitar (2–6, 8, 10, 12), programming (2–4, 6, 9); sampler, synthesiser (2); drums (3, 4, 7, 10), bass (4, 6, 10), percussion (4, 9, 11), electric guitar (7); acoustic guitar, drum programming (11)
- Carter Lang – bass (3, 7–9); programming, synthesiser (3); guitar (8)
- Conor Dickinson – acoustic guitar (7), guitar (9, 12), electric guitar (11)
- Dylan Buzz Gold – drums (8)
- Jojo Faught – guitar (8)
- Adrian Simon – acoustic guitar (11)
- Conner West – pedal steel guitar (11)
- Tia Shek – spoken word (14)

=== Technical ===
- Nathan Phillips – mixing (2–12)
- Dale Becker – mastering
- Lui Guimaraes – engineering (2, 11)
- John Rooney – engineering (3, 7–9, 12)
- Maxime Le Guil – engineering (4–6)
- Madison Claridge – engineering (10)
- Robert Sellens – engineering (10)
- Lola Young – engineering (13)
- Adam Burt – mastering assistance
- Katie Harvey – mastering assistance
- Noah McCorkle – mastering assistance
- Michael Deano – engineering assistance (3, 7–9, 12)
- Lucas Glastra – engineering assistance (4–6)
- Rémy Dumelz – engineering assistance (4–6)
- Georgia Allen – engineering assistance (10)
- Jan Ashwell – engineering assistance (10)

== Charts ==
Chart performance for I'm Only F**king Myself
Chart (2025)	Peak position
Australian Albums (ARIA)	12
Austrian Albums (Ö3 Austria)	18
Belgian Albums (Ultratop Flanders)	3
Belgian Albums (Ultratop Wallonia)	11
Dutch Albums (Album Top 100)	7
French Albums (SNEP)	35
German Albums (Offizielle Top 100)	11
German Pop Albums (Offizielle Top 100)	2
Irish Albums (Official Charts)	44
New Zealand Albums (RMNZ)	24
Polish Albums (ZPAV)	37
Portuguese Albums (AFP)	43
Scottish Albums (Official Charts)	3
Spanish Albums (Promusicae)	54
Swiss Albums (Schweizer Hitparade)	18
UK Albums (Official Charts)	3
US Billboard 200	68
US Top Rock & Alternative Albums (Billboard)	18
