= Cass Lowe =

British songwriter, record producer, and musician

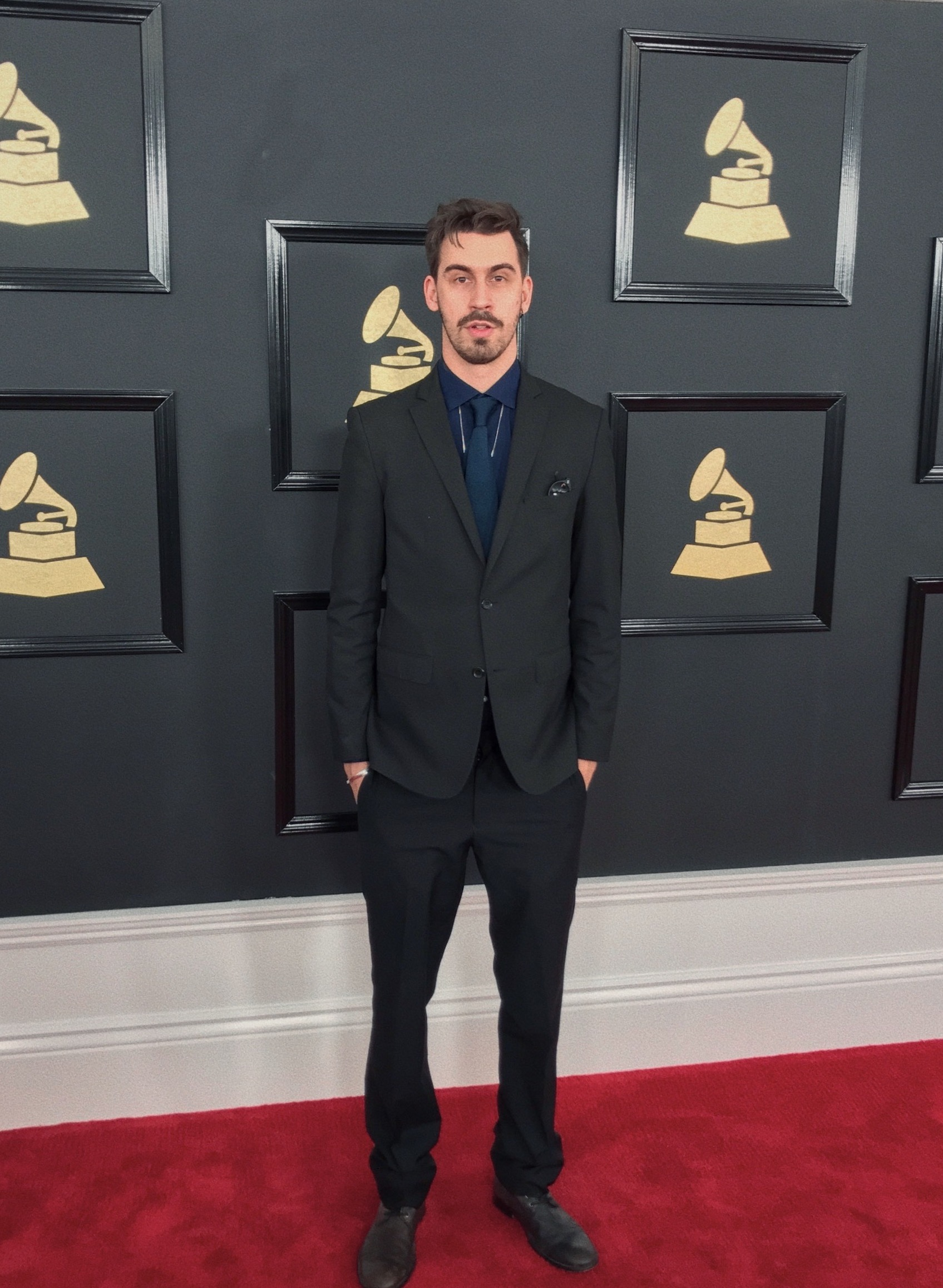
- Lowe in 2019

Background information
- Born: London, England
- Occupations: Songwriter; record producer; musician; singer
- Years active: 2010–present

Cass Lowe is a British songwriter, record producer, musician and singer. He is best known for his Grammy Award and Ivor Novello-winning collaborations with Jesse & Joy, Snakehips and Chance the Rapper. He is based in London and collaborates with artists across broad genres including Charli XCX, Kelsea Ballerini, Lola Young, Labrinth, Dermot Kennedy and Rudimental.

== Career ==
In 2016, Lowe won the Ivor Novello award for Best Contemporary Song with Snakehips for co-writing their song, "All My Friends", featuring Chance the Rapper and Tinashe. Lowe won the award for Songwriter Of The Year at the 2016 A&R awards. Charli XCX won NME's award for 'Best Track' for 'Boys', co-written and co-produced by Lowe, in 2018.

== Songwriting and production credits ==
Lowe has primarily been known for collaborating on hits with production duo Snakehips on a lot of their releases. Others include the collaborators listed below.

Year	Artist(s)	Song	Album	Role
2025	Charlotte Plank	"Chemical Fashion"	Non-album single	Co-writer/Producer
2025	Wes Nelson	"Yellow"	Non-album single	Producer
2024	6arelyhuman x Rico Nasty x Whethan	"Get Nasty"	Non-album single	Co-writer/Producer
2024	RMR	"Sweet Divorce"	Non-album single	Co-writer/Producer
2024	Brooke Candy	"Crucify My Love"	Candyland	Co-writer/Producer
2024	Lola Young	"Intrusive Thoughts"	This Wasn’t Meant For You Anyway	Co-writer/Producer
2024	Anyma x Bipolar Sunshine	"Lovehurt"	Non-album release	Co-writer
2023	Emily Burns	"Cheating On Her"	Non-album single	Co-writer/Producer
2023	Proph	"Trust Fall"	Non-album single	Co-writer/Producer
2023	Whethan x Nessa Barrett	"Sick Of Myself"	Non-album single	Co-writer/Producer
2023	Bryant Barnes	"Adore You"	Non-album single	Co-writer/Producer
2023	Lola Young	"Revolve Around You"	My Mind Wanders And Sometimes Leaves Completely	Co-Producer
2023	Forest Claudette	"Hi-Vis Teeth"	Everything Was Green	Co-writer/Producer
2023	Dermot Kennedy	"One Life"	Sonder	Co-writer/Producer
2023	Lola Young	"Annabel's House"	My Mind Wanders And Sometimes Leaves Completely	Co-writer/Producer
2023	FKA Twigs	"Killer - Victor & Rolf"	Ad Campaign	Additional Producer/Engineer
2022	Sea Girls	"Paracetamol Blues"	Homesick	Co-writer/Producer
2022	Jesse & Joy	Dos Cuerpos Un Alma"	Clichés	Co-writer
2022	James Arthur x You Me At Six	"Lose My Mind"	It'll All Make Sense in the End	Co-writer/Producer
2022	Josef Salvat	"Honey On The Tongue"	Islands	Co-writer
2022	Jesse & Joy	"Respirar"	Non-album single	Co-writer
2021	Jax Jones x Sinead Harnett	"Phases"	Pokémon 25: The Album	Co-writer/Producer
2021	Elderbrook	"Broken Mirror"	Innerlight	Co-writer/Producer
2021	Easy Life	"Lifeboat"	Life's A Beach	Co-writer/Producer
2021	Elderbrook	"Body"	Non-album single	Co-writer
2020	Little Mix	"A Mess (Happy 4 U)"	Confetti	Co-writer/Producer
2020	Little Mix	"Breathe"	Confetti	Co-writer/Producer
2020	NIKI x End Of The World	"Forever"	Non-album single	Co-writer/Producer
2020	GRACEY	"Don't"	Non-album single	Co-writer/Producer
2020	Jax Jones x Au/Ra	"i miss u"	Non-album single	Co-writer/Producer
2020	Kelsea Ballerini	"The Way I Used To"	Kelsea	Co-writer
2020	Kailee Morgue	"Tied Up"	In Your Bedroom	Co-writer/Producer
2020	Ingrid Andress	"Boys"	Lady Like	Co-writer
2020	Shakka	"SOS"	Non-album single	Co-writer/Producer
2019
2019	End Of The World x Clean Bandit	"Lost"	Non-album single	Co-writer
2019	Ekali feat. Wafia	"Be Fine"	Non-album single	Co-writer
2019	Sinead Harnett	"No Pressure"	Lessons In Love	Co-writer/Producer
2019	Astrid S	"Sidelove"	Down Low	Co-writer/Producer
2019	Labrinth	"Where The Wild Things"	Imagination & the Misfit Kid	Co-writer
2019	Rudimental	"Scared of Love" (featuring Ray BLK & Stefflon Don)	Toast to Our Differences	Co-writer
2018
2018	Rudimental x Tom Walker	Walk Alone	Toast to Our Differences	Co-writer
2018	MØ	"Nostalgia"	Forever Neverland	Co-writer
2018	Alex Adair	"I Will"	Non-album single	Co-writer/Producer
2018	Lily Allen	"Pushing Up Daises"	No Shame	Co-writer/Producer
2018	DNCE	"TV in the Morning"	People to People EP	Co-writer
2018	RL Grime feat. Jeremy Zucker	"Atoms"	Nova	Co-writer
2018	Jess Glynne	"Nevermind"	Always in Between	Co-writer/Producer
2018	Ray BLK	"Paradise"	Empress	Co-writer/Producer
2018	Felix Jaehn	"Hot 2 Touch"	Non-album single	Co-writer
2017	Snakehips x MØ	"Don't Leave"	Non-album single	Co-producer
2017	Astrid S	"Such A Boy"	Party's Over EP	Co-writer/Producer
2017	Astrid S	"Does She Know"	Party's Over EP	Co-writer/Producer
2017	Snakehips	"Right Now" (featuring DRAM, H.E.R. & Elhae)	Non-album single	Additional-producer
2017	Charli XCX	"Boys"	Non-album single	Co-writer/Producer
2017	Gryffin	"Love in Ruins" (featuring Sinead Harnett)	Non-album single	Co-writer
2017	Snakehips & Anne-Marie	"Either Way"	Non-album single	Producer
2017	Rudimental x James Arthur	"Sun Comes Up"	Toast to Our Differences	Co-writer/Producer
2017	Paloma Faith	"Kings and Queens"	The Architect	Co-writer
2016	Snakehips & ZAYN	"Cruel"	Non-album single	Co-writer/Producer
2016	AlunaGeorge	"I Remember"	I Remember	Co-writer
2016	Lido	"Angel"	Everything	Co-writer/Producer
2016	Tor Miller	"The Dirt"	American English	Co-writer
2016	Fifth Harmony	"Scared Of Happy"	7/27	Co-writer
2016	Hey Violet	"Pure"	Brand New Moves EP	Co-writer
2015	Snakehips x Tinashe & Chance the Rapper	"All My Friends"	All My Friends EP	Co-writer/Producer
2015	Blonde	"All Cried Out" (featuring Alex Newell)	Non-album single	Co-writer/additional producer
2015	Sinead Harnett	"Anywhere But Here"	She Ain't Me EP	Co-writer/producer
2015	Jesse & Joy	"Dueles"	Un Besito Más	Co-writer
2015	Kwabs	"Love + War"	Love + War	Co-writer/producer
2015	Kwabs	"Make You Mine"	Love + War	Co-writer/producer
2015	Gabrielle Aplin	"The House We Never Built"	Light Up the Dark	Co-writer
2015	Martin Solveig	"+1" (featuring Sam White)	Non-album single	Co-writer
2014	Chance The Rapper	"Semi Detached" (featuring Cass Lowe & BenZel)	Non-album single	Co-writer/Producer
2014	Cheryl	"Only Human"	Only Human	Co-writer
2014	Cheryl	"Coming Up for Air" (featuring Joel Compass)	Only Human	Co-writer/producer
2014	Shawn Mendes	"Show You"	The Shawn Mendes EP	Additional Producer
2014	Take That	"Let in the Sun"	III	Co-writer/Producer
2013	Alison Moyet	"Remind Yourself"	The Minutes	Co-writer
2013	Alison Moyet	"Love Reign Supreme"	The Minutes	Co-writer
2013	Shola Ama x Toddla T	"Alive"	Non-album single	Co-writer
2013	Shola Ama	"Boyfriend"	Non-album single	Co-writer/Producer
2012	Ronan Keating	"Love You and Leave You"	Fires	Co-writer/Producer
2012	Ronan Keating	"Oxygen"	Fires	Co-writer/Producer
2010	Diana Vickers	"You'll Never Get to Heaven"	Songs from the Tainted Cherry Tree	Co-writer

== Awards ==
Year	Awards/Body	Category	For	Result
2016	Grammy Awards	"Best Latin Album"	Jesse & Joy - "Un Besito Más"	Won
2016	Latin Grammy Awards	"Best Pop Album"	Jesse & Joy - "Un Besito Más"	Won
2016	Latin Grammy Awards	"Album Of The Year"	Jesse & Joy - "Un Besito Más"	Nominated
2017	Ivor Novello Awards	"Best Contemporary Song"	"All My Friends" by "Snakehips x Chance The Rapper x Tinashe	Won
2017	Music Business Worldwide Awards	"Songwriter Of The Year"	Cass Lowe	Won
2018	Mercury Music Prize	Mercury Music Prize	Lily Allen - "No Shame"	Nominated
2018	NME Awards	"Best Track"	Charli XCX - "Boys"	Won
2021	Grammy Awards	"Best Country Album"	Ingrid Andress - "Lady Like"	Nominated
