= One Thing (Lola Young song) =

2025 single by Lola Young

Single by Lola Young

from the album I'm Only F**king Myself
- Released: 16 May 2025
- Recorded: 2025
- Genre: Alternative pop
- Length: 3:28
- Label: Day One; Island
- Songwriters: Young; Carter Lang; Solomon; Dickinson; William Brown
- Producers: Solomonophonic; Lang; Manuka

Lola Young singles chronology
"Like Him" (2024)	"One Thing" (2025)	"Not Like That Anymore" (2025)

Music video
- "One Thing" on YouTube

"One Thing" is a song by English singer Lola Young, released on 16 May 2025 as the lead single from her third studio album, I'm Only F**king Myself (2025).

The song peaked at number 14 on the Bubbling Under Hot 100 chart.

== Background ==
In a press release for the music video, Young stated:

“It’s a song about sex and passion without strings needing to be attached, as it’s something I struggle achieving most of the time but something that I think is important for women especially to feel confident doing".

== Charts ==
Chart performance for "One Thing"
Chart (2025)	Peak position
Australia (ARIA)	43
Canada Hot 100 (Billboard)	54
Ireland (IRMA)	19
New Zealand (Recorded Music NZ)	32
UK Singles (Official Charts)	18
US Bubbling Under Hot 100 (Billboard)	14
US Hot Rock & Alternative Songs (Billboard)	16

== Certifications ==
Certifications for "One Thing"
Region	Certification	Certified units/sales
Australia (ARIA)	Gold	35,000^{‡}
Brazil (Pro-Música Brasil)	Gold	20,000^{‡}
Canada (Music Canada)	Gold	40,000^{‡}
New Zealand (RMNZ)	Gold	15,000^{‡}
United Kingdom (BPI)	Gold	400,000^{‡}
^{‡} Sales+streaming figures based on certification alone.
