= This Wasn't Meant for You Anyway =

Studio album by Lola Young
- Released: 21 June 2024
- Recorded: 2023–2024
- Length: 38:07
- Label: Island
- Producers: Carter Lang; Cass Lowe; Manuka; Monsune; Buddy Ross; Solomonophonic; Matt Zara

Lola Young chronology
My Mind Wanders and Sometimes Leaves Completely (2023)	This Wasn't Meant for You Anyway (2024)	I'm Only F**king Myself (2025)

Singles from This Wasn't Meant for You Anyway
- 1. "Conceited" Released: 29 September 2023; 2. "Wish You Were Dead" Released: 12 January 2024; 3. "Intrusive Thoughts" Released: 23 February 2024; 4. "Big Brown Eyes" Released: 5 April 2024; 5. "Fuck" Released: 3 May 2024; 6. "Messy" Released: 30 May 2024; 7. "Good Books" Released: 18 June 2024

Professional ratings
Aggregate scores
Source	Rating
Metacritic	91/100
Review scores
Source	Rating
The Guardian	4/5 stars
NME	5/5 stars

This Wasn't Meant for You Anyway is the second studio album by English singer and songwriter Lola Young. It was released on 21 June 2024 via Island Records. It follows her 2023 debut album, My Mind Wanders and Sometimes Leaves Completely. The album contains her UK number-one single "Messy", which was the sixth single, and was met with acclaim from critics; it reached number sixteen on the UK Albums Chart.

It also earned Young nominations for Best New Artist and won Best Pop Solo Performance for "Messy" at the 68th Grammy Awards.

== Track listing ==
This Wasn't Meant for You Anyway track listing
No.	Title	Writer(s)	Producer(s)	Length
1.	"Good Books"	Lola Young; William Brown; Conor Dickinson; Carter Lang; Buddy Ross; Jared Solomon	Buddy Ross; Carter Lang; Solomonophonic; Manuka^{[a]}	4:14
2.	"Wish You Were Dead"	Young; Brown; Dickinson; Solomon; Matt Zara	Matt Zara; Solomonophonic; Manuka	3:14
3.	"Big Brown Eyes"	Young; Brown; Dickinson; Solomon	Solomonophonic; Manuka	3:38
4.	"Conceited"	Young; Brown; Dickinson; Solomon	Solomonophonic; Manuka^{[a]}	3:59
5.	"Messy"	Young; Dickinson	Lang; Monsune; Solomonophonic; Manuka	4:44
6.	"Walk on By"	Young; Brown; Dickinson; Solomon	Solomonophonic; Manuka	3:34
7.	"You Noticed"	Young; Brown; Dickinson; Solomon	Solomonophonic; Manuka	4:30
8.	"Crush"	Young; Brown; Dickinson; Lang; Solomon	Solomonophonic; Manuka	3:46
9.	"Fuck"	Young; Brown; Dickinson; Solomon	Solomonophonic; Manuka^{[a]}	2:44
10.	"Intrusive Thoughts"	Young; Cass Lowe	Solomonophonic; Cass Lowe	2:31
11.	"Outro"	Young	Young	1:13
Total length:				38:07

Note

- ^{^[a]} signifies an additional producer

== Personnel ==
Credits adapted from Tidal.

=== Musicians ===
- Lola Young – vocals
- Jared Solomon – bass (tracks 1–3, 5, 6, 8), synthesiser (1–3, 6, 9), programming (1, 5, 6, 9), electric guitar (2, 3, 5, 6, 8), drums (2, 3, 9), acoustic bass guitar (7)
- Conor Dickinson – electric guitar (tracks 1, 2, 4, 9), percussion (4), acoustic guitar (5, 7), bass guitar (5), bass (9)
- Will Brown – keyboards (tracks 1, 5), organ (1, 7), synthesiser (2, 3, 5, 9), drums (2, 4, 6, 9); bass, electric guitar (2); piano (3, 6)
- Carter Lang – bass, drums (track 1); electric guitar, keyboards, percussion, synthesiser (5)
- Buddy Ross – programming, sampler, synthesiser (track 1)
- Matt Zara – electric guitar, piano, programming, synthesiser (track 2)
- Monsune – keyboards, programming (track 5)
- Cass Lowe – electric guitar, programming (track 10)

=== Technical ===
- Dale Becker – mastering (tracks 1–10)
- Jasper Ward – mastering (track 11)
- Nathan Phillips – mixing (tracks 1–9)
- David Wrench – mixing (track 10)
- Jared Solomon – engineering (track 2)
- Nate Mingo – mastering assistance (track 4)

=== Visuals ===
- Studio Island – artwork
- Sophie Jones – photography

== Charts ==
=== Weekly charts ===
Weekly chart performance for This Wasn't Meant for You Anyway
Chart (2024–2025)	Peak position
Austrian Albums (Ö3 Austria)	43
Belgian Albums (Ultratop Flanders)	25
Belgian Albums (Ultratop Wallonia)	27
Canadian Albums (Billboard)	38
Danish Albums (Hitlisten)	28
Dutch Albums (Album Top 100)	12
French Albums (SNEP)	41
French Rock & Metal Albums (SNEP)	3
German Albums (Offizielle Top 100)	12
Scottish Albums (Official Charts)	6
Swiss Albums (Schweizer Hitparade)	53
UK Albums (Official Charts)	16
US Billboard 200	64
US Top Rock & Alternative Albums (Billboard)	8

=== Year-end charts ===
Year-end chart performance for This Wasn't Meant for You Anyway
Chart (2025)	Position
French Albums (SNEP)	97

== Certifications ==
Certifications for This Wasn't Meant for You Anyway
Region	Certification	Certified units/sales
Belgium (BRMA)	Gold	10,000^{‡}
France (SNEP)	Gold	50,000^{‡}
Norway (IFPI Norway)	Gold	10,000^{‡}
Poland (ZPAV)	Gold	15,000^{‡}
^{‡} Sales+streaming figures based on certification alone.
