= From Down Here =

2026 single by Lola Young

Single by Lola Young
- Released: 22 May 2026
- Recorded: 2026
- Length: 4:01
- Label: Island
- Songwriters: Lola Young; James Blake; Dom Maker; Jameela Jamil
- Producers: James Blake; Dom Maker; Jameela Jamil

Lola Young singles chronology
"Spiders" (2025)	"From Down Here" (2026)

Music video
- "From Down Here" on YouTube

"From Down Here" is a song by English singer Lola Young, released on 22 May 2026. This song marks the first release from Lola Young after she went on temporary hiatus due to her on-stage collapse at All Things Go's New York festival.

== Background ==
Young stated in a press release for the song:

"The day after the GRAMMYs, I had a wave of inspiration hit me, so I got in the studio with the incredible James Blake and made this song".

== Reception ==
The Fader wrote a positive review of the song saying, "The song features Young's recognizably vulnerable writing style and emotionally raw vocals, filled with rasp and expressiveness. It's a promising and exciting start to a new chapter for Young".

== Live performance ==
Young played the song live for the first time at BBC Radio 1's Big Weekend before joining James Blake during his BBC Radio 1's Big Weekend set to perform a song from his album, Trying Times.

== Charts ==
=== Weekly charts ===
Weekly chart performance
Chart (2026)	Peak position
Estonia Airplay (TopHit)	71
New Zealand Hot Singles (RMNZ)	11
UK Singles Sales (OCC)	88
US Hot Rock & Alternative Songs (Billboard)	46

=== Monthly charts ===
Monthly chart performance
Chart (2026)	Peak position
Estonia Airplay (TopHit)	95
