= Grammy Award for Best Pop Solo Performance =

Annual popular music award

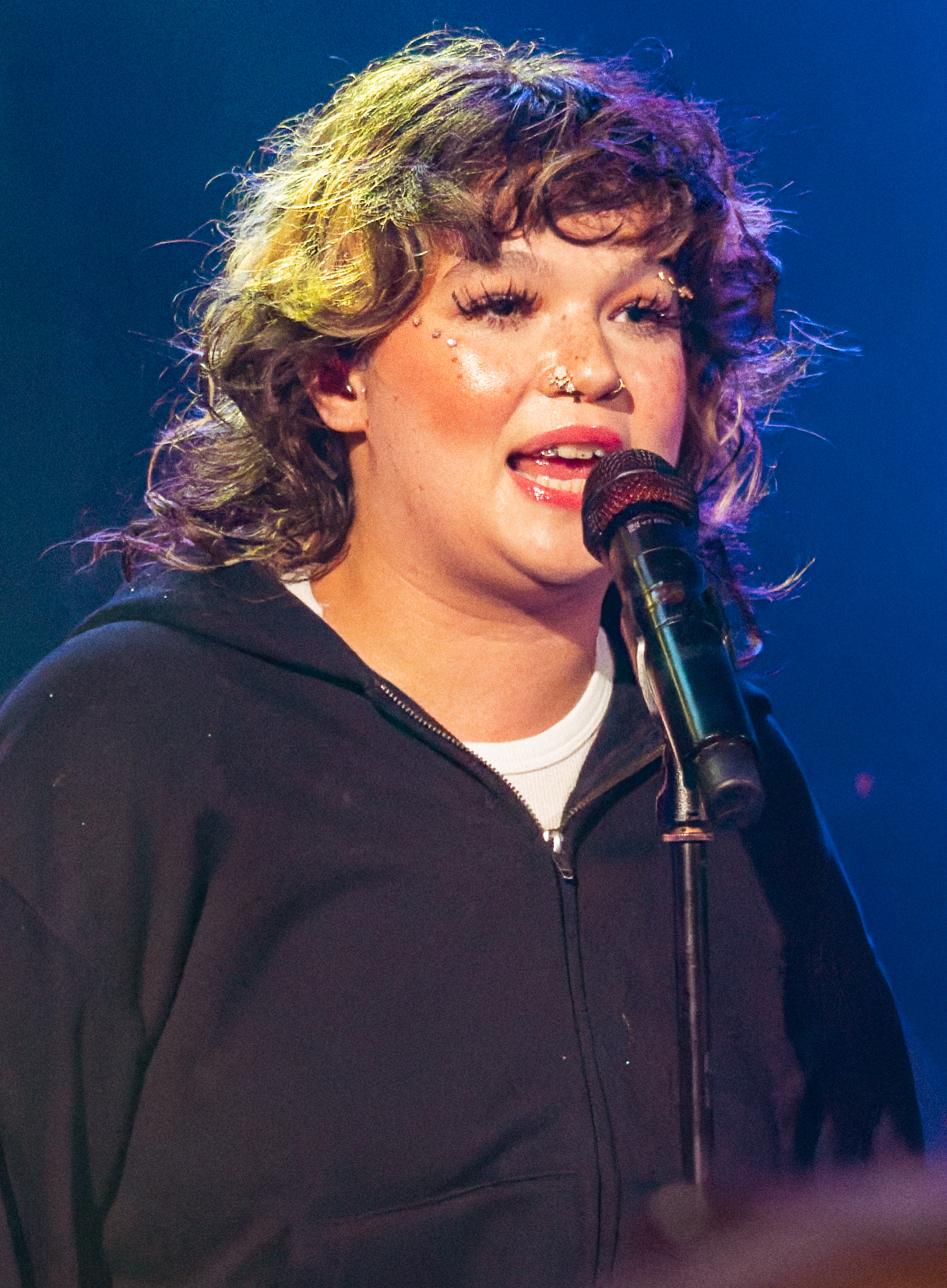
- "Messy" by Lola Young is the most recent recipient
- Awarded for: Artistic excellence in a solo vocal or instrumental pop performance
- Country: United States
- Presented by: National Academy of Recording Arts and Sciences
- First award: 2012
- Currently held by: Lola Young – "Messy" (2026)

Highlights
- Most wins: Adele (4)
- Most nominations: Taylor Swift; Billie Eilish (5 each)
- Website: grammy.com

The Grammy Award for Best Pop Solo Performance is an award presented at the Grammy Awards, a ceremony that was established in 1958 and originally called the Gramophone Awards. According to the 54th Grammy Awards description guides, the Best Pop Solo Performance Award as being designed for a solo performance pop recording (vocal and instrumental) and is limited to singles or tracks only.

The category was introduced at the 54th Annual Grammy Awards in 2012 and combined the previous categories for Best Female Pop Vocal Performance, Best Male Pop Vocal Performance and Best Pop Instrumental Performance. The restructuring of these categories was a result of the Recording Academy's wish to decrease the list of categories and awards and to eliminate the distinctions between male and female (and in some cases, solo instrumental) performances.

The award goes to the performing artist. The producer, engineer and songwriter can apply for a Winners Certificate.

Adele has the most victories (with four wins), and is the only act so far to win this category for consecutive years. Taylor Swift and Billie Eilish lead all performers with five nominations. The current holder of the award is Lola Young for "Messy", which won at the 68th Annual Grammy Awards.

== Recipients ==
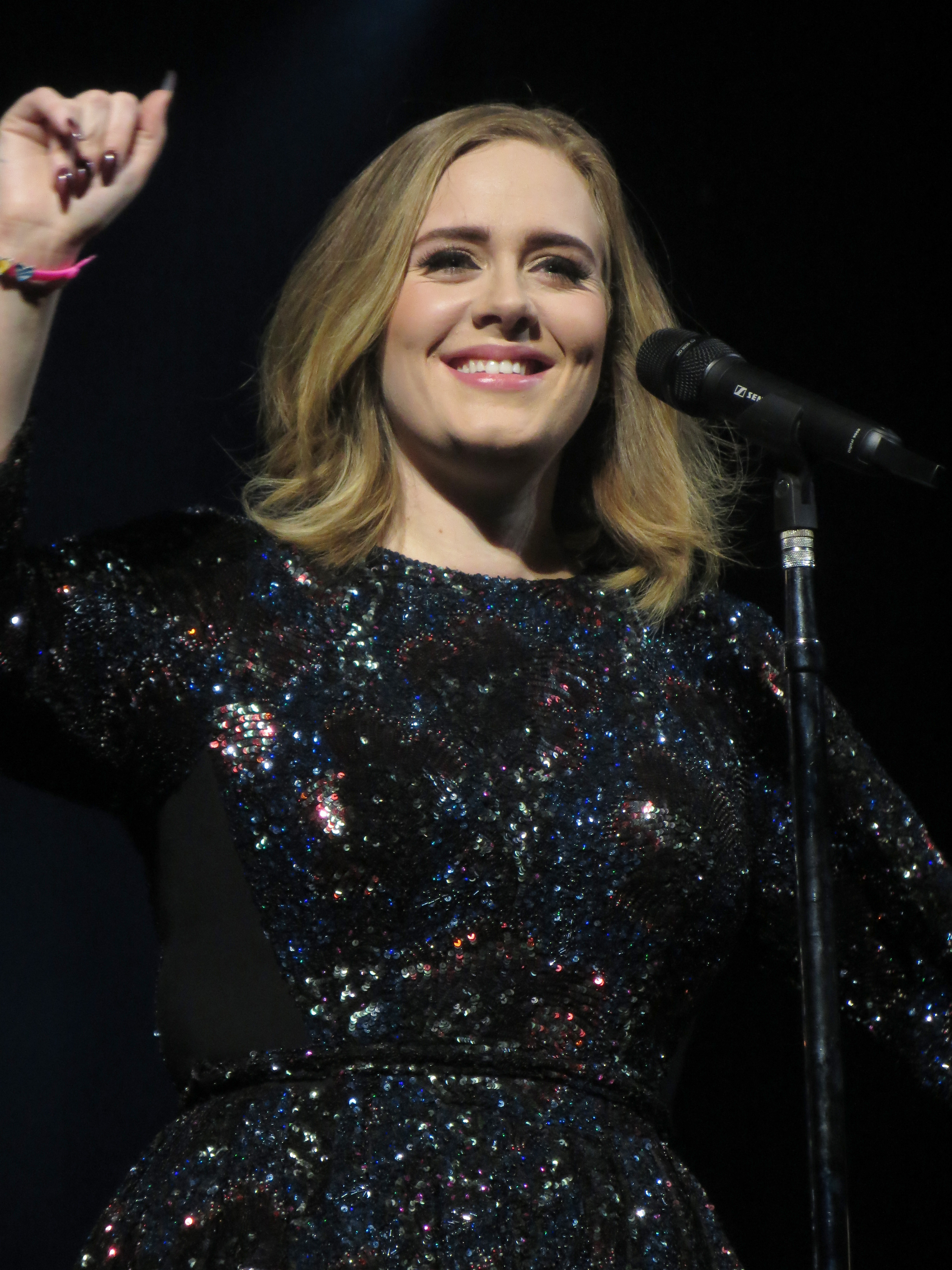
Adele was the first recipient of this award, and won it four times in 2012, 2013, 2017, and 2023.

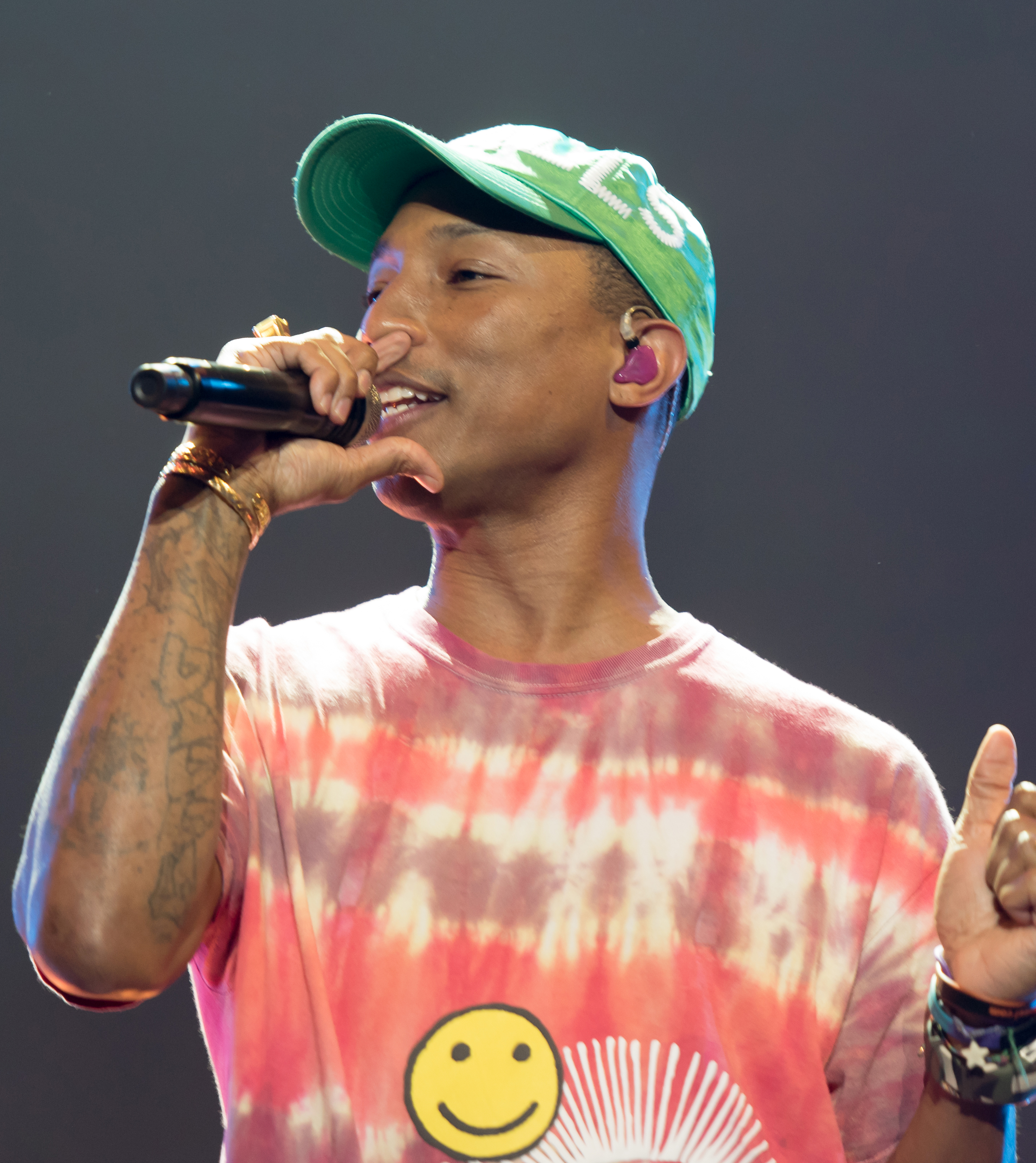
2015 winner Pharrell Williams.

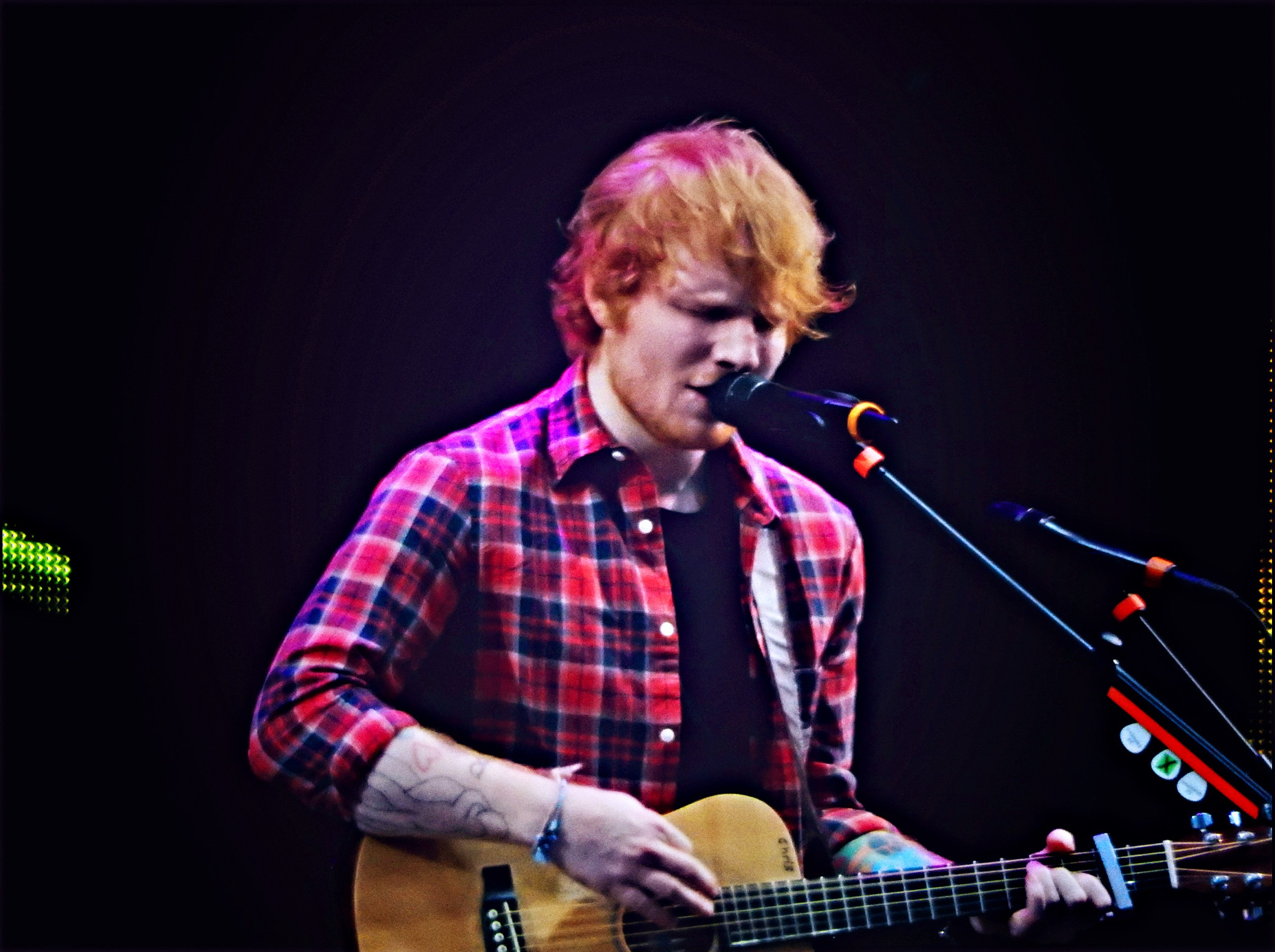
Two-time winner Ed Sheeran won in 2016 and 2018.

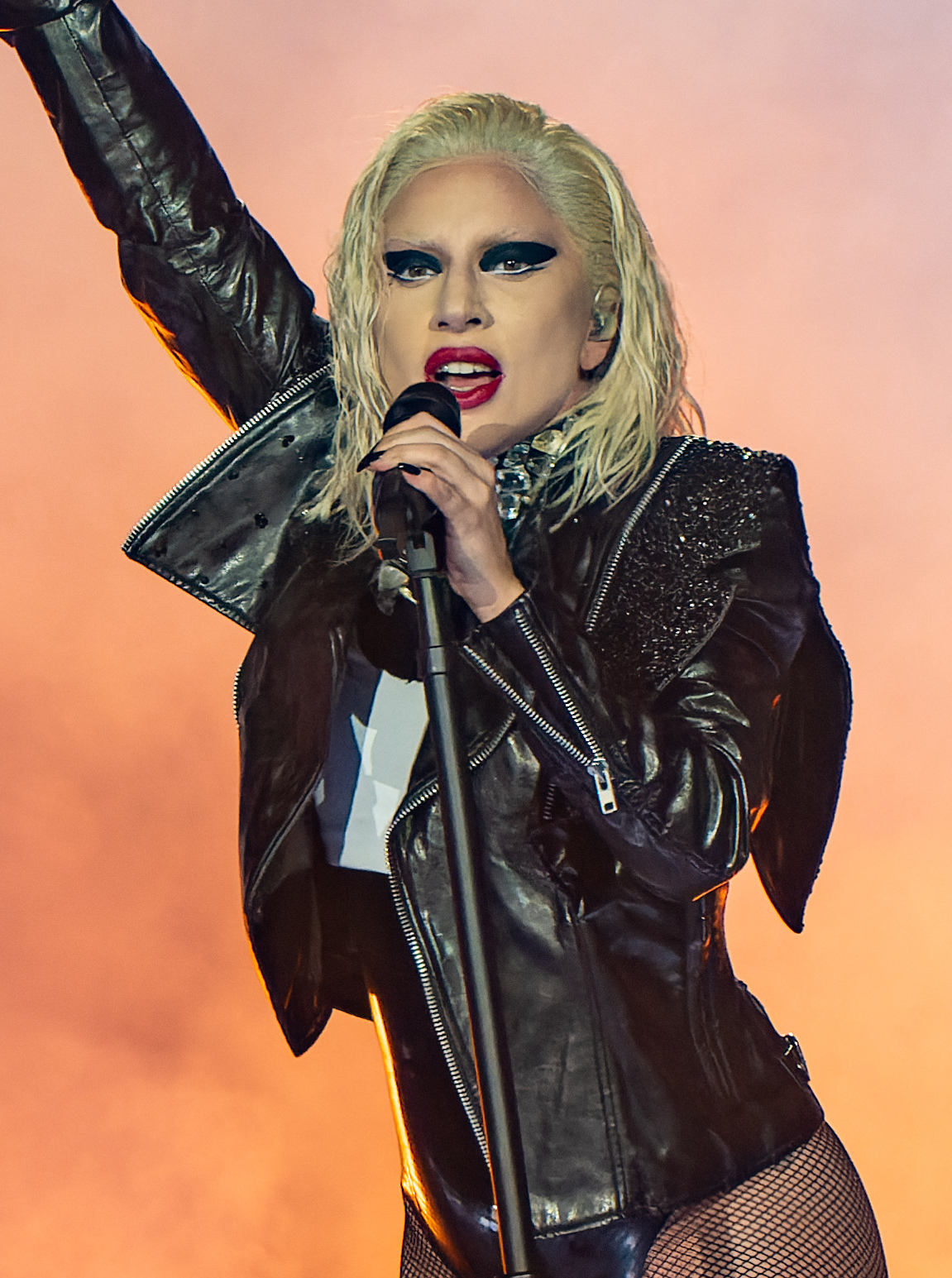
2019 winner Lady Gaga.

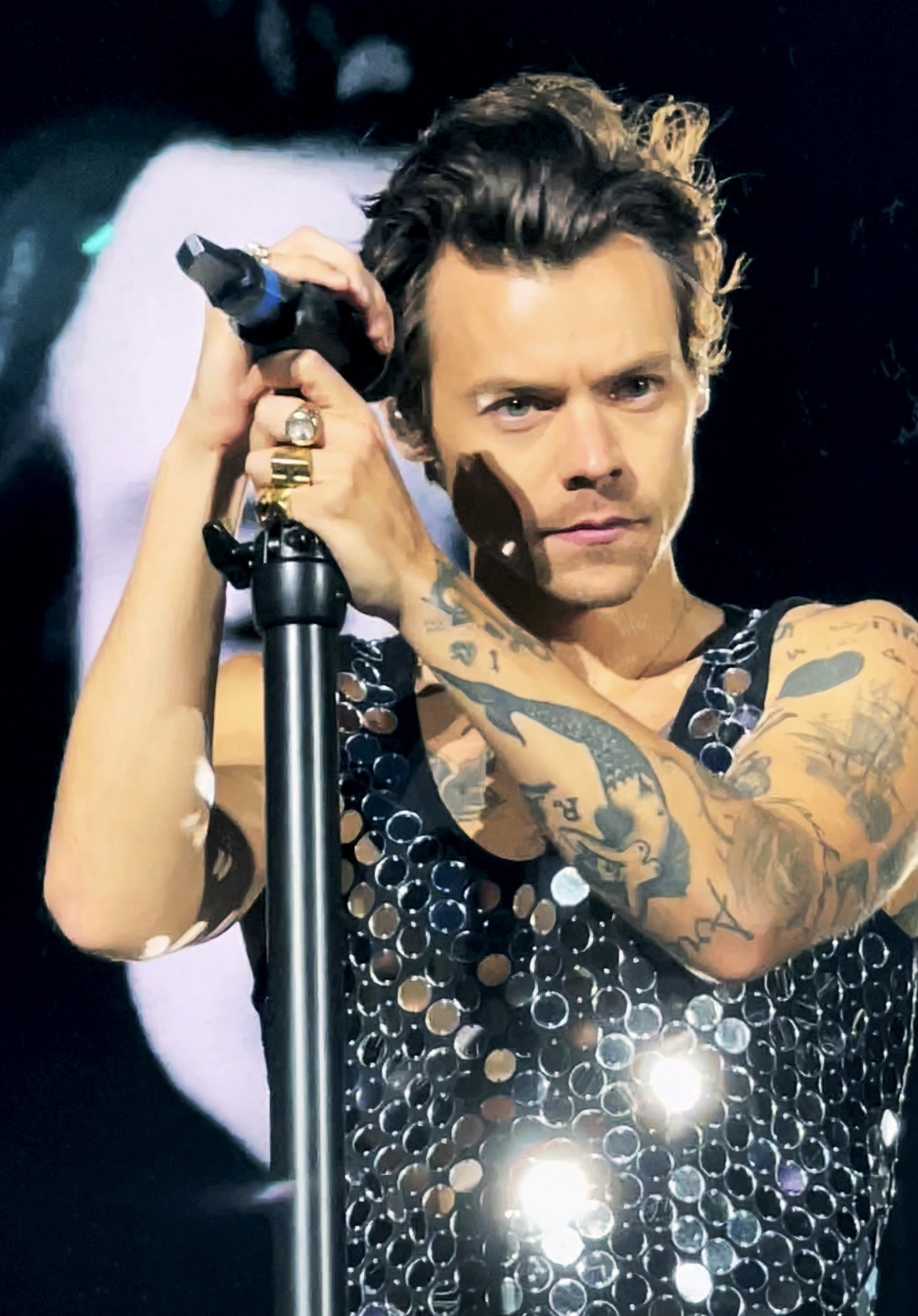
2021 winner Harry Styles.

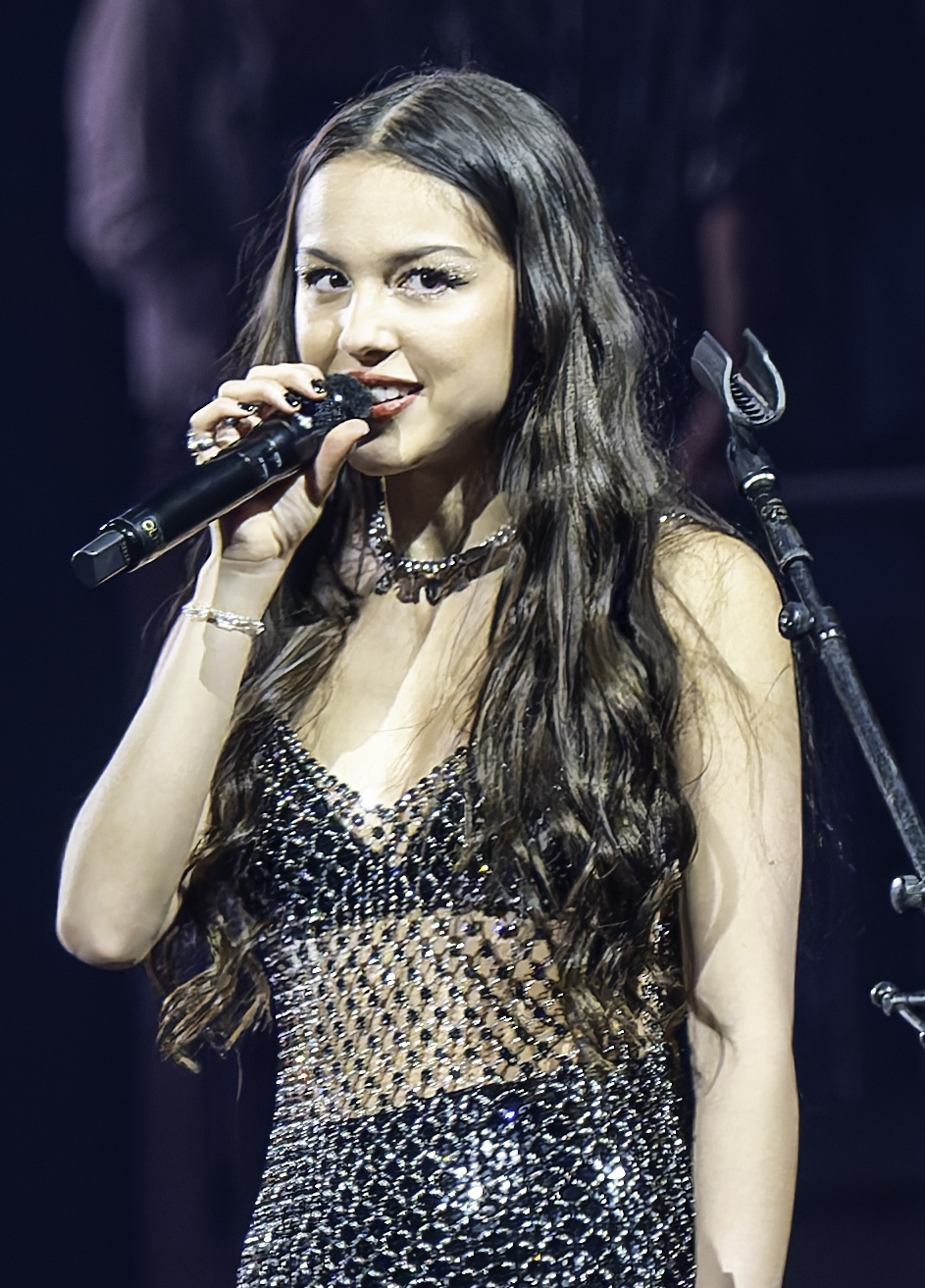
2022 winner Olivia Rodrigo.

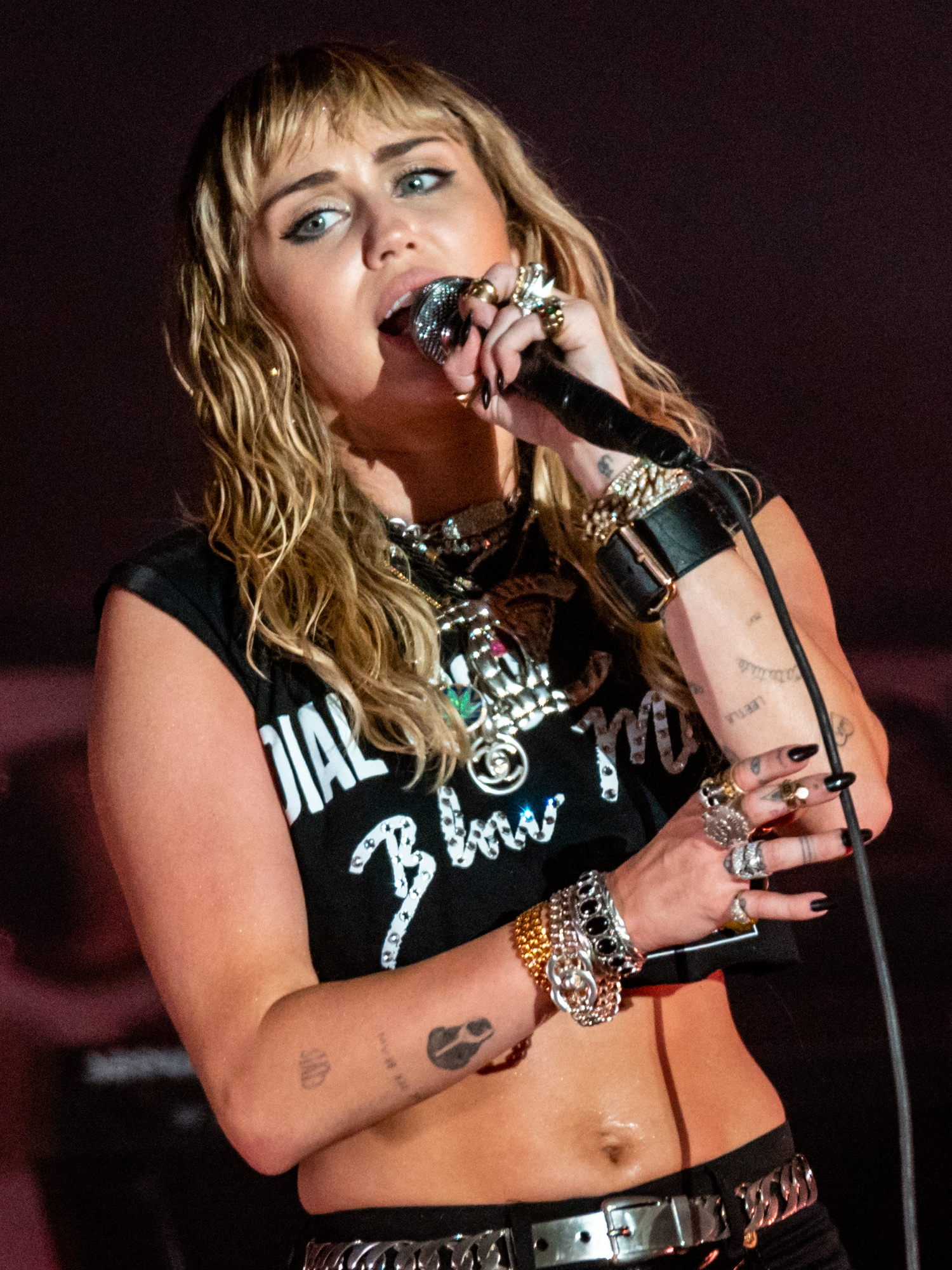
2024 winner Miley Cyrus.

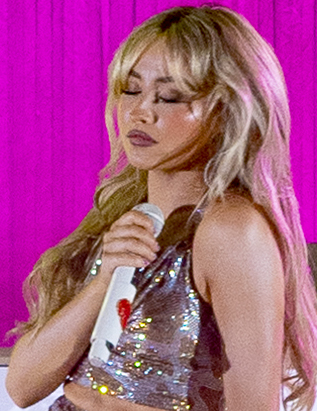
2025 winner Sabrina Carpenter.

=== 2010s ===
| Year | Performing artist(s) | Work |
2012
| 2012 | Adele | "Someone Like You" |
| 2012 | Lady Gaga | "You and I" |
| 2012 | Bruno Mars | "Grenade" |
| 2012 | Katy Perry | "Firework" |
| 2012 | Pink | "Fuckin' Perfect" |
2013
| 2013 | Adele | "Set Fire to the Rain" (Live) |
| 2013 | Kelly Clarkson | "Stronger (What Doesn't Kill You)" |
| 2013 | Carly Rae Jepsen | "Call Me Maybe" |
| 2013 | Katy Perry | "Wide Awake" |
| 2013 | Rihanna | "Where Have You Been" |
2014
| 2014 | Lorde | "Royals" |
| 2014 | Sara Bareilles | "Brave" |
| 2014 | Bruno Mars | "When I Was Your Man" |
| 2014 | Katy Perry | "Roar" |
| 2014 | Justin Timberlake | "Mirrors" |
2015
| 2015 | Pharrell Williams | "Happy" (Live) |
| 2015 | John Legend | "All of Me" (Live) |
| 2015 | Sia | "Chandelier" |
| 2015 | Sam Smith | "Stay with Me" (Darkchild version) |
| 2015 | Taylor Swift | "Shake It Off" |
2016
| 2016 | Ed Sheeran | "Thinking Out Loud" |
| 2016 | Kelly Clarkson | "Heartbeat Song" |
| 2016 | Ellie Goulding | "Love Me Like You Do" |
| 2016 | Taylor Swift | "Blank Space" |
| 2016 | The Weeknd | "Can't Feel My Face" |
2017
| 2017 | Adele | "Hello" |
| 2017 | Beyoncé | "Hold Up" |
| 2017 | Justin Bieber | "Love Yourself" |
| 2017 | Kelly Clarkson | "Piece by Piece" (Idol version) |
| 2017 | Ariana Grande | "Dangerous Woman" |
2018
| 2018 | Ed Sheeran | "Shape of You" |
| 2018 | Kelly Clarkson | "Love So Soft" |
| 2018 | Kesha | "Praying" |
| 2018 | Lady Gaga | "Million Reasons" |
| 2018 | Pink | "What About Us" |
2019
| 2019 | Lady Gaga | "Joanne (Where Do You Think You're Goin'?)" |
| 2019 | Beck | "Colors" |
| 2019 | Camila Cabello | "Havana" (Live) |
| 2019 | Ariana Grande | "God Is a Woman" |
| 2019 | Post Malone | "Better Now" |

=== 2020s ===
| Year | Performing artist(s) | Work |
2020
| 2020 | Lizzo | "Truth Hurts" |
| 2020 | Beyoncé | "Spirit" |
| 2020 | Billie Eilish | "Bad Guy" |
| 2020 | Ariana Grande | "7 Rings" |
| 2020 | Taylor Swift | "You Need to Calm Down" |
2021
| 2021 | Harry Styles | "Watermelon Sugar" |
| 2021 | Justin Bieber | "Yummy" |
| 2021 | Doja Cat | "Say So" |
| 2021 | Billie Eilish | "Everything I Wanted" |
| 2021 | Dua Lipa | "Don't Start Now" |
| 2021 | Taylor Swift | "Cardigan" |
2022
| 2022 | Olivia Rodrigo | "Drivers License" |
| 2022 | Justin Bieber | "Anyone" |
| 2022 | Brandi Carlile | "Right on Time" |
| 2022 | Billie Eilish | "Happier Than Ever" |
| 2022 | Ariana Grande | "Positions" |
2023
| 2023 | Adele | "Easy on Me" |
| 2023 | Bad Bunny | "Moscow Mule" |
| 2023 | Doja Cat | "Woman" |
| 2023 | Steve Lacy | "Bad Habit" |
| 2023 | Lizzo | "About Damn Time" |
| 2023 | Harry Styles | "As It Was" |
2024
| 2024 | Miley Cyrus | "Flowers" |
| 2024 | Doja Cat | "Paint the Town Red" |
| 2024 | Billie Eilish | "What Was I Made For?" |
| 2024 | Olivia Rodrigo | "Vampire" |
| 2024 | Taylor Swift | "Anti-Hero" |
2025
| 2025 | Sabrina Carpenter | "Espresso" |
| 2025 | Beyoncé | "Bodyguard" |
| 2025 | Charli XCX | "Apple" |
| 2025 | Billie Eilish | "Birds of a Feather" |
| 2025 | Chappell Roan | "Good Luck, Babe!" |
2026
| 2026 | Lola Young | "Messy" |
| 2026 | Justin Bieber | "Daisies" |
| 2026 | Sabrina Carpenter | "Manchild" |
| 2026 | Lady Gaga | "Disease" |
| 2026 | Chappell Roan | "The Subway" |
| 2027 | Olivia Dean | "Man I Need" |
| 2027 | Bruno Mars | "Risk It All" |
| 2027 | Raye | "Where Is My Husband!" |
| 2027 | Olivia Rodrigo | "The Cure" |
| 2027 | Rosalía | "Sauvignon Blanc" |

== Artists with multiple awards ==
4 wins

- Adele

2 wins

- Ed Sheeran

== Artists with multiple nominations ==
5 nominations

- Billie Eilish
- Taylor Swift

4 nominations

- Ariana Grande
- Adele
- Justin Bieber
- Kelly Clarkson
- Lady Gaga

3 nominations

- Beyoncé
- Doja Cat
- Katy Perry
- Bruno Mars
- Olivia Rodrigo

2 nominations

- Sabrina Carpenter
- Lizzo
- P!nk
- Chappell Roan
- Ed Sheeran
- Harry Styles

== See also ==
- Grammy Award for Best Female Pop Vocal Performance
- Grammy Award for Best Male Pop Vocal Performance
- Grammy Award for Best Pop Instrumental Performance
