= Cruel (Snakehips song) =

Single by Snakehips featuring Zayn
- Released: 15 July 2016
- Genre: Pop
- Length: 3:48
- Label: Sony UK; Columbia
- Songwriters: Snakehips; Cass Lowe; Erik Hassle; Zayn Malik
- Producers: Snakehips; Cass Lowe

Snakehips singles chronology
"Money on Me" (2016)	"Cruel" (2016)	"Burn Break Crash" (2016)

Zayn singles chronology
"Wrong" (2016)	"Cruel" (2016)	"Freedun" (2016)

Music video
- "Cruel" on YouTube

"Cruel" is a song by British production duo Snakehips featuring English singer-songwriter Zayn. It was released as a single on 15 July 2016 by Sony Music UK and Columbia Records. The song was written and composed by Oliver Lee and James Carter of Snakehips, along with Cass Lowe, Erik Hassle and Zayn. "Cruel" received critical acclaim, with NME ranking the song at number 50 on their "50 Best Tracks of 2016" list, and MuuMuse ranking it at number 88 on their "Top 100 Singles of 2016" list.

== Music video ==
An accompanying music video for "Cruel" premiered on YouTube on 9 August 2016 and stars Zayn as he sings the song inside a building in an Asian town. The video was directed by Alex Southam.

== Charts ==
=== Weekly charts ===
Chart (2016)	Peak position
Australia (ARIA)	34
Belgium (Ultratip Bubbling Under Flanders)	24
France (SNEP)	147
Ireland (IRMA)	55
Netherlands (Dutch Top 40 Tiparade)	9
New Zealand (Recorded Music NZ)	31
Portugal (AFP)	89
Scottish Singles Sales (Official Charts)	31
Sweden (Sverigetopplistan)	79
UK Singles (Official Charts)	33
UK Asian (Official Charts Company)	1
US Hot Dance/Electronic Songs (Billboard)	17

=== Year-end charts ===
Chart (2016)	Position
US Hot Dance/Electronic Songs (Billboard)	62

== Certifications ==
Region	Certification	Certified units/sales
Australia (ARIA)	Gold	35,000^{‡}
Brazil (Pro-Música Brasil)	Gold	30,000^{‡}
New Zealand (RMNZ)	Platinum	30,000^{‡}
United Kingdom (BPI)	Silver	200,000^{‡}
^{‡} Sales+streaming figures based on certification alone.

== Release history ==
Region	Date	Format	Version	Label	Ref.
Worldwide	15 July 2016	Digital download	Original	Sony UK; Columbia	
Worldwide	23 September 2016	Digital download	Remixes	Sony UK; Columbia	
