= ASCAP Vanguard Award =

American music award

- Awarded for: "Shaping the future of music"
- Country: United States
- Presented by: American Society of Composers, Authors and Publishers (ASCAP)
- First award: 1996
- Website: www.ascap.com

The ASCAP Vanguard Award is an annual award presented by the American Society of Composers, Authors and Publishers (ASCAP), in recognition of "the impact of new and developing musical genres, which help shape the future of music. The award was first presented to Soul Asylum and Björk in 1996. The honor was not presented in 2012, and years with more than one recipient include 1996, 1997, 1998, 2007, 2008, 2010, 2011, and 2013. It is awarded at each of their ceremonies: pop, country, Latin, and rhythm & soul music.

== Recipients ==
- 2025 - N/A
- 2024 - Victoria Monét (R&B), Cian Ducrot (London)
- 2023 - N/A
- 2022 - N/A
- 2021 - N/A
- 2020 - N/A
- 2019 - Billie Eilish & Finneas (Pop), Draco Rosa (Latin), Brothers Osborne (Country), Benj Pasek & Justin Paul (Screen)
- 2018 - Visitante (Latin), Gerald Clayton (Jazz), Portugal. The Man (Pop), Migos (R&B), Tom Walker & Stefflon Don (London)
- 2017 - Meghan Trainor (Pop), Vico C (Latin), Kelsea Ballerini (Country), Dua Lipa & The Amazons (London)
- 2016 - Walk the Moon (Pop), Chris Stapleton (Country), Jess Glynne & MNEK (London)
- 2015 - St. Vincent (Pop)
- 2014 - Fun, Dan Smith
- 2013 - Kendrick Lamar (R&B), Diplo (Pop)
- 2012 - N/A (Not presented)
- 2011 - Third Day, The Civil Wars, Band of Horses
- 2010 - Taio Cruz, Janelle Monáe, The Killers
- 2009 - Santigold, Calvin Harris
- 2008 - Kate Nash, Black Guayaba, Sara Bareilles
- 2007 - Bat for Lashes, The All-American Rejects
- 2006 - Joseph Arthur
- 2005 - Arcade Fire
- 2004 - The Mars Volta
- 2003 - Jack Johnson
- 2002 - The Strokes
- 2001 - Modest Mouse
- 2000 - Built to Spill
- 1999 - Beastie Boys
- 1998 - Nine Inch Nails, The Mighty Mighty Bosstones
- 1997 - Beck, The Presidents of the United States of America
- 1996 - Soul Asylum, Björk
