= Messy (Lola Young song) =

2024 single by Lola Young

Single by Lola Young

from the album This Wasn't Meant for You Anyway
- Released: 30 May 2024
- Recorded: 2023
- Genre: Indie pop; pop rock; pop soul
- Length: 4:44; 3:20 (radio edit)
- Label: Day One; Island
- Songwriters: Lola Young; Conor Dickinson
- Producers: Solomonophonic; Manuka; Monsune; Carter Lang

Lola Young singles chronology
"Fuck" (2024)	"Messy" (2024)	"Good Books" (2024)

Music video
- "Messy" on YouTube

"Messy" is a song by English singer Lola Young, released on 30 May 2024 as the sixth single from her second studio album, This Wasn't Meant for You Anyway (2024). It went viral on the video sharing app TikTok and became her first charting song, peaking at the top of the UK Singles Chart.

Outside the United Kingdom, the song reached number one in Australia, Belgium, Croatia, Ireland, and Israel. It also peaked within the top ten in several other countries, including Austria, Canada, Denmark, France, Germany, Greece, Latvia, Luxembourg, the Netherlands, New Zealand, Norway, Sweden, and Switzerland, while peaking at number 14 on the US Billboard Hot 100 and topping the Pop Airplay chart, becoming Young's first top 40 hit as an solo artist in the US to date.

It also earned Young nominations for Best Alternative at the 2025 MTV Video Music Awards and a win for the category Best Pop Solo Performance at the 68th Grammy Awards.

== Background ==
Young stated in an interview with Metal Magazine:

"Messy" is an ADHD anthem, it really showcases everything I felt during my last relationship, but also it is deeper than that, as it talks about how I feel about myself in general—being too messy one day and too clean another, struggling to find that balance in myself.

In an interview with Atwood Magazine, Young said that "Messy" had her favourite lyrics in This Wasn't Meant for You Anyway and she considered them some of her best. She also described: "It's raw, honest, and encapsulates a lot of the themes of the album. It's about embracing imperfections and finding strength in who I am, scatty or not lol."

== Composition ==
"Messy" is a soul-pop and '80s inspired pop-rock song. It finds Young in an increasingly angry vocal tone, as she directs sharp criticism toward a lover for certain expectations imposed on her. In a Variety interview, Young stated she took the demo to 64Sound in Los Angeles where she described the analog studio "like a studio in the '70s". She described the influences in the song as “It feels a bit rocky, there’s a ’90s hip-hop influence, folk music inspired the lyricism and there’s some pop too.”

== Music video ==
In the video for the song directed by Sarah Dattani Tucker, Young dances around a mostly empty room. She is also seen with a large birthday cake and stands in the far right corner of the room near the end of the video.

== Critical reception ==
Brian Denney of Atwood Magazine wrote: "'Messy' is a beautiful display of Young's gritty vocals and world-class lyrical storytelling. As a listener, it plays out as if you are watching the singer leave an angry voicemail to her lover, simply fed up with the irrationality of trying to please a partner who will never be satisfied."

== Promotion ==
On 28 November 2024, social media personalities Jake Shane and Sofia Richie posted a clip on TikTok of them dancing to the song, with moves including finger guns and a "half-shimmy". It led to the song gaining significant popularity, achieving 3.9 million official on-demand streams in the United States, and being used in over 250,000 videos on TikTok, including one by Kylie Jenner of her lip syncing to the song.

Young has performed the song live on The Graham Norton Show, The Tonight Show Starring Jimmy Fallon, Like a Version, and Elvis Duran and the Morning Show.

== Charts ==
=== Weekly charts ===
Weekly chart performance for "Messy"
Chart (2024–2025)	Peak position
Argentina Anglo Airplay (Monitor Latino)	4
Australia (ARIA)	1
Austria (Ö3 Austria Top 40)	6
Austria Airplay (IFPI)	2
Belarus Airplay (TopHit)	118
Belgium (Ultratop 50 Flanders)	1
Belgium (Ultratop 50 Wallonia)	1
Brazil Hot 100 (Billboard)	97
Brazil Airplay (Top 100 Brasil)	53
Bulgaria Airplay (PROPHON)	4
Canada Hot 100 (Billboard)	7
Canada AC (Billboard)	10
Canada CHR/Top 40 (Billboard)	3
Canada Hot AC (Billboard)	1
Canada Modern Rock (Billboard Canada)	2
Central America Anglo Airplay (Monitor Latino)	4
Chile Anglo Airplay (Monitor Latino)	3
Colombia Anglo Airplay (National-Report)	2
CIS Airplay (TopHit)	9
Costa Rica Anglo Airplay (Monitor Latino)	2
Croatia International Airplay (Top lista)	1
Czech Republic Airplay (ČNS IFPI)	4
Czech Republic Singles Digital (ČNS IFPI)	20
Denmark (Tracklisten)	8
Dominican Republic Anglo Airplay (Monitor Latino)	1
Ecuador Anglo Airplay (Monitor Latino)	3
Estonia Airplay (TopHit)	3
Finland (Suomen virallinen lista)	32
France (SNEP)	6
Germany (GfK)	7
Global 200 (Billboard)	5
Greece International (IFPI)	7
Guatemala Anglo Airplay (Monitor Latino)	3
Hungary (Rádiós Top 40)	3
Hungary (Single Top 40)	36
Iceland (Tónlistinn)	3
Ireland (IRMA)	1
Israel (Mako Hitlist)	33
Italy (FIMI)	32
Italy Airplay (EarOne)	1
Japan Hot Overseas (Billboard Japan)	18
Latin America Anglo Airplay (Monitor Latino)	2
Latvia Airplay (LaIPA)	1
Latvia Streaming (LaIPA)	5
Lebanon (Lebanese Top 20)	2
Lithuania (AGATA)	5
Lithuania Airplay (TopHit)	4
Luxembourg (Billboard)	3
Malta Airplay (Radiomonitor)	6
Mexico Anglo Airplay (Monitor Latino)	1
Netherlands (Dutch Top 40)	2
Netherlands (Single Top 100)	4
New Zealand (Recorded Music NZ)	4
Nigeria (TurnTable Top 100)	28
North Macedonia Airplay (Radiomonitor)	1
Norway (VG-lista)	4
Panama Anglo Airplay (Monitor Latino)	1
Paraguay Airplay (Monitor Latino)	6
Peru Airplay (Monitor Latino)	13
Poland Airplay (OLiS)	3
Poland Streaming (OLiS)	8
Portugal (AFP)	8
Puerto Rico Airplay (Monitor Latino)	5
Romania Airplay (UPFR)	2
Romania Airplay (Media Forest)	1
Romania TV Airplay (Media Forest)	8
Russia Airplay (TopHit)	14
San Marino Airplay (SMRTV Top 50)	1
Serbia Airplay (Radiomonitor)	6
Slovakia Airplay (ČNS IFPI)	3
Slovakia Singles Digital (ČNS IFPI)	26
Slovenia Airplay (Radiomonitor)	2
Spain (Promusicae)	53
Spain Airplay (Promusicae)	1
Sweden (Sverigetopplistan)	8
Switzerland (Schweizer Hitparade)	3
Switzerland Airplay (IFPI)	2
Thailand (IFPI)	15
Turkey International Airplay (Radiomonitor Türkiye)	6
Ukraine Airplay (TopHit)	109
UK Singles (Official Charts)	1
Uruguay Anglo Airplay (Monitor Latino)	3
US Billboard Hot 100	14
US Adult Contemporary (Billboard)	21
US Adult Pop Airplay (Billboard)	1
US Hot Rock & Alternative Songs (Billboard)	2
US Pop Airplay (Billboard)	1
US Rock & Alternative Airplay (Billboard)	1
Venezuela Anglo Airplay (Monitor Latino)	7

=== Monthly charts ===
Monthly chart performance for "Messy"
Chart (2025)	Position
CIS Airplay (TopHit)	13
Czech Republic (Rádio Top 100)	54
Estonia Airplay (TopHit)	4
Lithuania Airplay (TopHit)	4
Paraguay Airplay (SGP)	40
Romania Airplay (TopHit)	21
Russia Airplay (TopHit)	26

=== Year-end charts ===
Year-end chart performance for "Messy"
Chart (2025)	Position
Argentina Anglo Airplay (Monitor Latino)	12
Australia (ARIA)	8
Austria (Ö3 Austria Top 40)	7
Belgium (Ultratop 50 Flanders)	3
Belgium (Ultratop 50 Wallonia)	4
Canada (Canadian Hot 100)	9
Canada AC (Billboard)	17
Canada CHR/Top 40 (Billboard)	12
Canada Hot AC (Billboard)	15
Canada Modern Rock (Billboard)	8
Chile Airplay (Monitor Latino)	78
CIS Airplay (TopHit)	26
Estonia Airplay (TopHit)	41
France (SNEP)	14
Germany (GfK)	10
Global 200 (Billboard)	17
Hungary (Rádiós Top 40)	59
Hungary (Single Top 40)	80
Iceland (Tónlistinn)	30
Italy (FIMI)	81
Lithuania Airplay (TopHit)	6
Netherlands (Dutch Top 40)	2
Netherlands (Single Top 100)	5
New Zealand (Recorded Music NZ)	10
Poland (Polish Airplay Top 100)	4
Poland (Polish Streaming Top 100)	29
Romania Airplay (TopHit)	95
Russia Airplay (TopHit)	71
Sweden (Sverigetopplistan)	29
Switzerland (Schweizer Hitparade)	4
UK Singles (OCC)	2
US Billboard Hot 100	28
US Adult Pop Airplay (Billboard)	11
US Hot Rock & Alternative Songs (Billboard)	5
US Pop Airplay (Billboard)	16
US Rock & Alternative Airplay (Billboard)	1

== Certifications ==
Certifications for "Messy"
Region	Certification	Certified units/sales
Australia (ARIA)	5× Platinum	350,000^{‡}
Belgium (BRMA)	Platinum	40,000^{‡}
Brazil (Pro-Música Brasil)	2× Diamond	320,000^{‡}
Canada (Music Canada)	4× Platinum	320,000^{‡}
Denmark (IFPI Danmark)	Platinum	90,000^{‡}
France (SNEP)	Diamond	333,333^{‡}
Germany (BVMI)	Platinum	600,000^{‡}
Italy (FIMI)	Gold	100,000^{‡}
New Zealand (RMNZ)	3× Platinum	90,000^{‡}
Norway (IFPI Norway)	Platinum	60,000^{‡}
Poland (ZPAV)	2× Platinum	250,000^{‡}
Portugal (AFP)	3× Platinum	30,000^{‡}
Spain (Promusicae)	Platinum	100,000^{‡}
Switzerland (IFPI Switzerland)	Platinum	30,000^{‡}
United Kingdom (BPI)	3× Platinum	1,800,000^{‡}
United States (RIAA)	2× Platinum	2,000,000^{‡}
Streaming
Central America (CFC)	Gold	3,500,000^{†}
Greece (IFPI Greece)	2× Platinum	4,000,000^{†}
^{‡} Sales+streaming figures based on certification alone.^{†} Streaming-only figures based on certification alone.

== See also ==
- List of number-one singles of 2025 (Australia)
- List of number-one singles of 2025 (Ireland)
- List of UK Singles Chart number ones of the 2020s
