= My Mind Wanders and Sometimes Leaves Completely =

Studio album by Lola Young
- Released: 26 May 2023
- Genre: R&B
- Length: 32:04
- Labels: Day One; Island
- Producers: Jim-E Stack; Cass Lowe; Charlie Perry; Malay; Manuka

Lola Young chronology
After Midnight (2021)	My Mind Wanders and Sometimes Leaves Completely (2023)	This Wasn't Meant for You Anyway (2024)

Singles from My Mind Wanders and Sometimes Leaves Completely
- 1. "Stream of Consciousness" Released: 25 November 2022; 2. "Annabel's House" Released: 25 January 2023; 3. "Don't Hate Me" Released: 24 February 2023; 4. "What Is It About Me" Released: 31 March 2023; 5. "Money" Released: 5 May 2023

My Mind Wanders and Sometimes Leaves Completely is the debut studio album by English singer and songwriter Lola Young. It was released on 26 May 2023 through Day One and Island Records.

== Background ==
Young has stated that she doesn't consider the album as an "album"; instead, she sees it as a "project". Young has schizoaffective disorder, which was a major inspiration for the lyrics on the album.

== Reception ==
Professional ratings
Aggregate scores
Source	Rating
Metacritic	79/100
Review scores
Source	Rating
De Standaard	4/5 stars
DIY	3/5 stars
Gigwise	8/10
NME	4/5 stars
The Guardian	4/5 stars
The Line of Best Fit	6/10

Young's voice on the album has been compared to Adele and Amy Winehouse, and her lyrics to those of Lily Allen. Kitty Empire of The Guardian claims that she also heard "a smidge of Kae Tempest" in Young's lyrics. Having a cyst on her vocal cords, Sophie Williams of NME noticed that this made Young sound rawer and deeper than before. According to Williams, Young goes beyond the "spacey atmospherics" of her earlier work on this album. She called the album "the overdue arrival of a completely credible new talent." Peter Vantyghem of De Standaard compared Young's "approach" to the debut album by Belgian soul singer Selah Sue.

== Tracklist ==
No.	Title	Length
1.	"Stream of Consciousness"	3:21
2.	"Revolve Around You"	3:12
3.	"Annabel’s House"	3:25
4.	"Semantic Satiation"	3:00
5.	"Pretty in Pink"	3:37
6.	"Money"	2:40
7.	"What Is It About Me"	3:34
8.	"Black Cab"	3:44
9.	"Don’t Hate Me"	2:42
10.	"Chill Out"	2:48
Total length:		32:04
