= Lola Young =

English musician (born 2001)

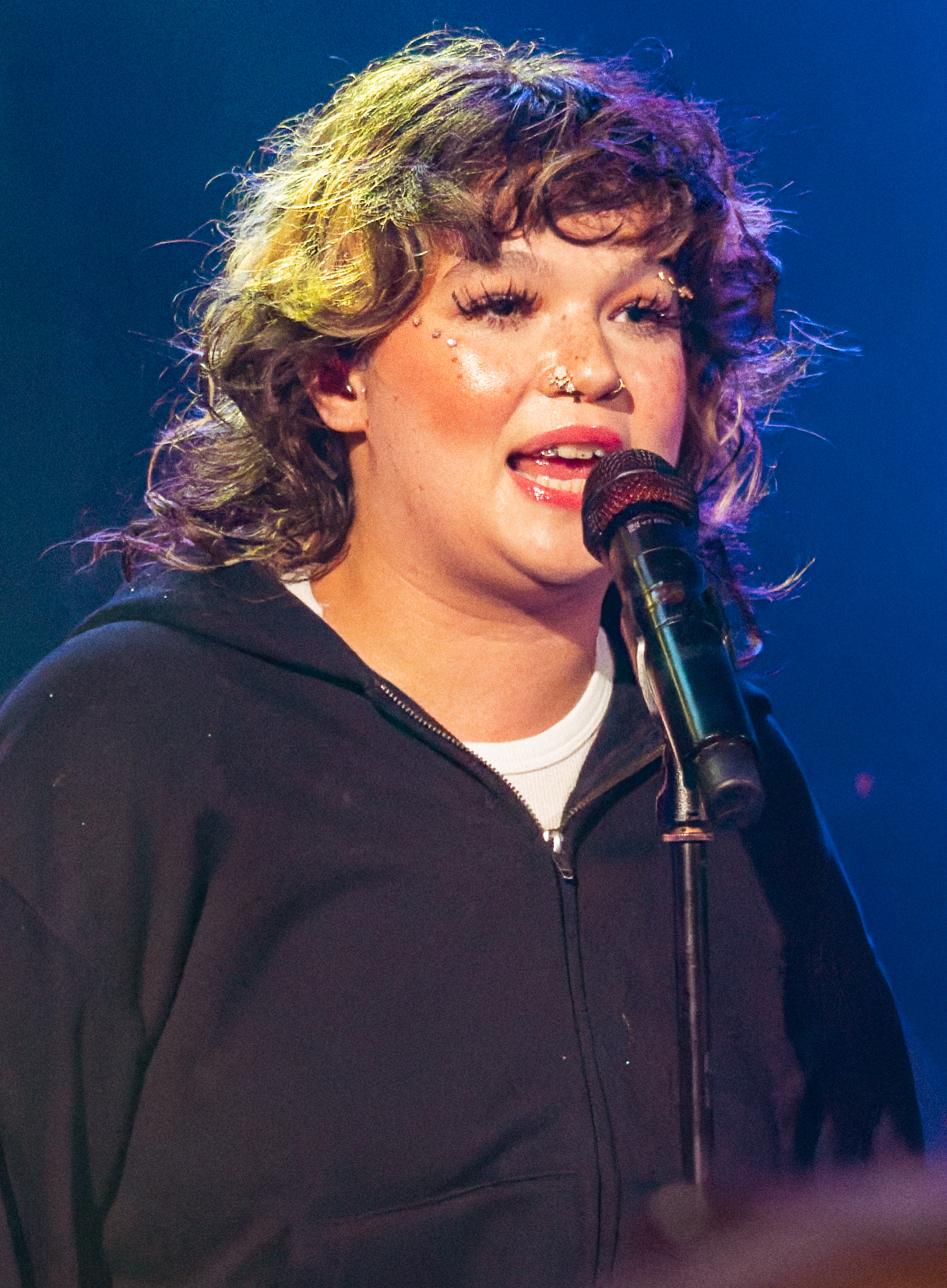
- Young performing in 2025

Background information
- Born: Lola Emily Mary Young; 4 January 2001 (age 25); London, England
- Genres: Pop; R&B; soul
- Occupations: Singer; songwriter
- Years active: 2019–present
- Labels: Day One; Island
- Website: lola-young.com

Lola Emily Mary Young (born 4 January 2001) is an English singer and songwriter. Born and raised in South London, she attracted attention in 2016 when she won the under-16 category of Open Mic UK and reached the finals of Got What It Takes?. She released her debut single in October 2019 and then the EPs Intro, Renaissance, and After Midnight. In 2021, she recorded a version of Giorgio Moroder and Philip Oakey's "Together in Electric Dreams" for that year's John Lewis Christmas advert. Around this time, she was nominated for the Brit Award for Rising Star and came fourth on the BBC's Sound of....

Young released the albums My Mind Wanders and Sometimes Leaves Completely and This Wasn't Meant for You Anyway in 2023 and 2024. The latter reached the top 20 of the UK Albums Chart after its single "Messy" went viral on TikTok and topped several singles charts, earning her a Grammy Award for Best Pop Solo Performance. The album track "Conceited" later peaked at number 63. Young was subsequently listed on Forbes 30 Under 30 and won the Ivor Novello Award for Rising Star and the ASCAP Vanguard Award.

Her third album I'm Only F**king Myself and its tracks "One Thing", "D£aler", and "Post Sex Clarity" peaked at numbers 3, 18, 27, and 60 in the UK. Young's health declined around the time of I'm Only F**king Myself's release and she paused her public appearances for three months after collapsing mid-performance. She has cited influence from Arctic Monkeys's AM, SZA's Ctrl, and from the artists Joni Mitchell, Prince, Frank Ocean, and Anderson .Paak. Her works have addressed substandard partners, sex, and her schizoaffective disorder, drug use, bisexuality, and attention deficit hyperactivity disorder.

== Life and career ==
=== 2001–2023: Early life and career beginnings ===
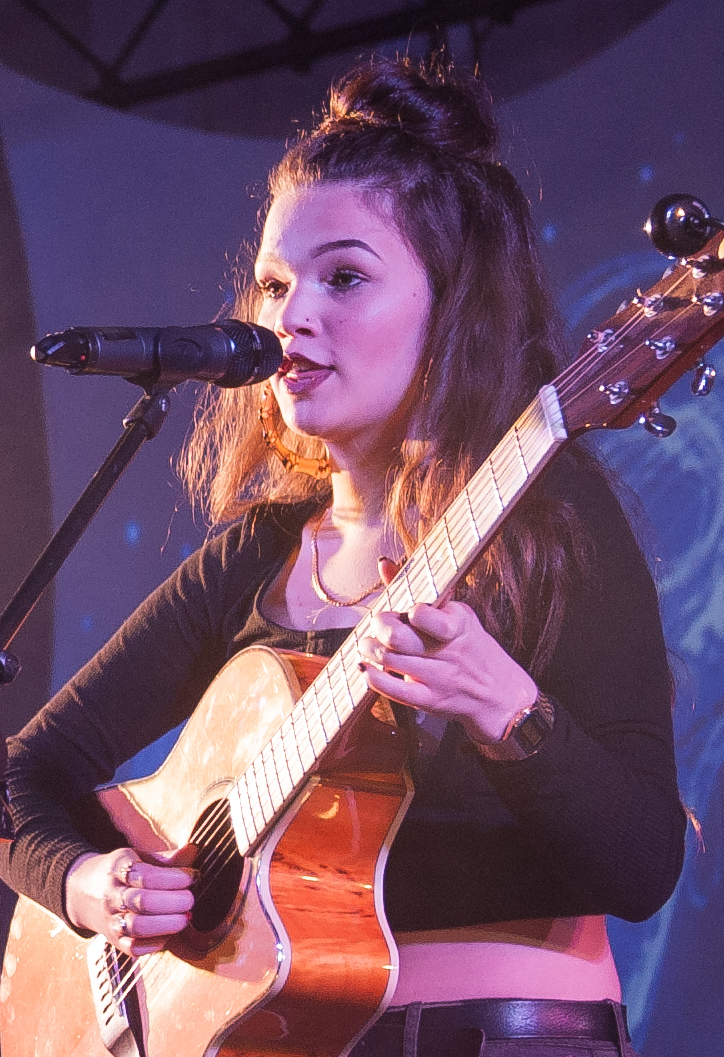
Young in 2016

Lola Emily Mary Young was born on 4 January 2001 in Croydon to a Jamaican-Chinese father and English mother. She grew up in Beckenham with three sisters including Becky Young, who campaigned for the music industry environmental charity EarthPercent and ran the anti-fatphobia Instagram account Anti-Diet Riot Club. Their mother worked for Mind, while their stepfather was a bass player and their great-aunt is The Gruffalo author Julia Donaldson. Lola started writing songs aged 11 and began performing at open mic nights aged 14. From Year 10, she attended the BRIT School, a place she described in an interview as "a hub for people who maybe couldn't be themselves even at home, but [...] could be themselves there".

In January 2016, she won the under-16 category of the Open Mic UK singing competition and appeared on CBBC's Got What It Takes?, which she reached the finals of. Amy Winehouse's former manager Nick Shymansky met Young the following year after she performed at The Bedford in Balham. He had gone there looking for a replacement artist for a documentary and subsequently became Young's joint manager with Nick Huggett, who had previously signed Adele. Young was subsequently diagnosed with schizoaffective disorder aged 17.

Young released her debut single, "6 Feet Under", in October 2019. She also released the EP Intro that year, followed by a music video for Intro track "3rd of Jan (Getting Ready)" that day. Promotion for Intro was interrupted due to Young developing a cyst on her vocal cords, for which she underwent surgery. She released "Pick Me Up" on Capitol Records in March 2020 and the single "None for You" and the EP Renaissance in April. In July, she released the single "Woman", which was accompanied the month after by a video in which she and several other women appeared nude.

Island Records subsequently signed Young and released her single "Ruin My Make Up" in March 2021. By August, she also had released the singles "Bad Tattoo" and "Blue (2AM)". That month, she released After Midnight, an EP of love songs recorded on piano. In September, she performed on The Late Late Show with James Corden and released the single "Fake", which she performed on Later... with Jools Holland. In November, her rendition of Giorgio Moroder and Philip Oakey's "Together in Electric Dreams" soundtracked that year's John Lewis Christmas advert. Around this time, she was nominated for the Brit Award for Rising Star and came fourth on the BBC's Sound of... poll.

Young released "So Sorry" in January 2022, which she performed on The Graham Norton Show. Her subsequent singles "Stream of Consciousness", "Annabel's House", "Don't Hate Me", "What Is It About Me", and "Money", were released between November 2022 and May 2023 and featured on her debut album My Mind Wanders and Sometimes Leaves Completely in May 2023. The title was a reference to her schizoaffective disorder and many of the tracks pertained to it. A returning cyst meant that Young's voice was raspier than on previous records. The album failed to reach the main chart, but appeared at number 40 on the Albums Sales chart, although "Don't Hate Me" went viral on TikTok.

=== 2023–present: "Messy" and chart successes ===
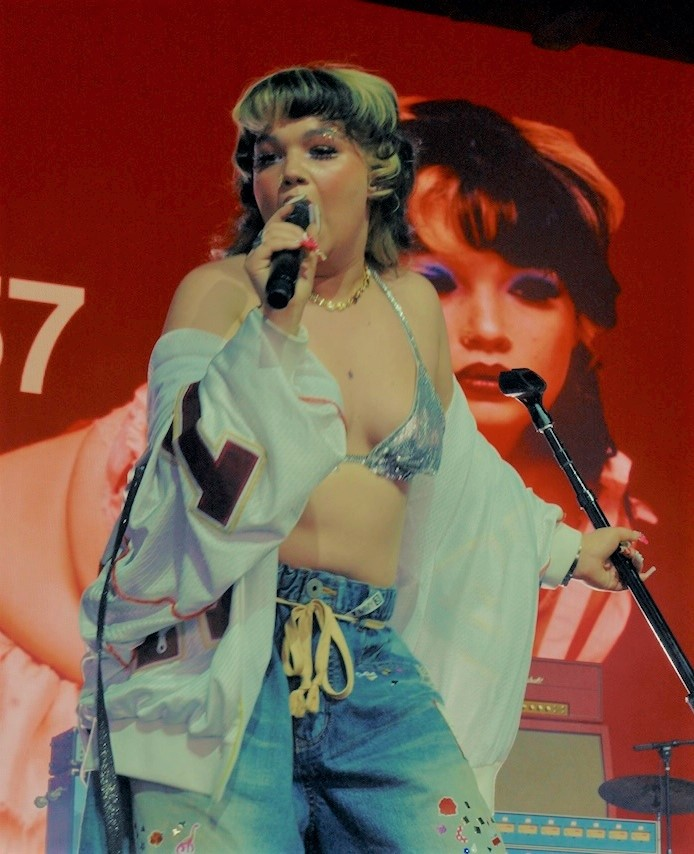
Young in 2025

Between September 2023 and May 2024, Young released the singles "Conceited", "Wish You Were Dead", "Fuck", and "Messy". That June, all four appeared on This Wasn't Meant for You Anyway, an album largely written about substandard ex-boyfriends. She then released the August single "Flicker of Light", which subsequently featured on the soundtrack to EA Sports FC 25, and the October single "Charlie", which featured Lil Yachty. Around the time of the latter, she featured on Tyler, the Creator's "Like Him" from his album Chromakopia.

From November 2024, Young spent five weeks undergoing drug rehabilitation to address a cocaine addiction. Around this time, "Messy" went viral on TikTok and live, stripped, instrumental, and sped-up variations of the song were released. The song topped the UK singles chart for four weeks, topped the charts in Belgium, Croatia, Israel, Australia, and Ireland, and charted at No. 14 on the Billboard Hot 100. "Like Him" also entered the top 40 in the UK and US around this time. Young performed "Messy" on The Tonight Show Starring Jimmy Fallon in January 2025.

In March 2025, This Wasn't Meant for You Anyway entered the top 20 of the UK Albums Chart after vinyl variants and a CD edition were released. Around this time, Young performed "Messy" at that year's Brit Awards and went viral for her reaction to losing the Brit Award for British Pop Act to Jade. In April 2025, "Conceited" peaked at No. 63 on the UK singles chart following popularity on TikTok and BBC Radio 1 and the release of a 7 inch single. Young was subsequently listed on Forbes 30 Under 30 and won the Ivor Novello Award for Rising Star and the ASCAP Vanguard Award.

She released the single "One Thing" in May 2025 alongside a music video, which was later nominated for Best Pop Video at the 2025 UK Music Video Awards. She subsequently supported Billie Eilish in Paris on two June stops of her Hit Me Hard and Soft: The Tour at Eilish's invitation. Young released the singles "Not Like That Anymore", "D£aler", and "Spiders" between June and September 2025; all three and "One Thing" featured on I'm Only F**king Myself [sic], an album about sex, drugs, and poor mental health. "One Thing", "D£aler", focus track "Post Sex Clarity", and "Spiders" entered the UK singles chart, the first three at 18, 27, and 60, respectively, and the album debuted at number 3 on the UK Albums Chart. Young planned a deluxe version of the album and a tour visiting the UK and North America in late 2025 and South America and Europe in 2026. She was one of several acts to call on Keir Starmer to block drilling at Rosebank oil and gas field in August 2025 and to be interviewed by NME for their November coffee table book The Cover 2024-2025.

Throughout 2025, Young concerts occasionally suffered complications; an April performance at Coachella was interrupted after she ran offstage retching and a June performance at the Summertime Ball reduced her to tears after her in-ear monitors failed mid-performance. Her team hired a sober coach after she relapsed and cancelled an appearance on The Tonight Show in July and welfared her out of a performance at a Prudential Center charity concert in September. A planned set at that year's Reading Festival was also cancelled on scheduling grounds. Two days after her planned Prudential performance, she got five songs into a set at All Things Go's New York festival before collapsing during "Conceited" and pausing public activity to work on herself; she resumed performing in January 2026. Some sources published from late October 2025 attributed her collapse to exhaustion; however, in a March 2026 Rolling Stone interview, she stated that she had spent two months in a residential facility and had attended Alcoholics Anonymous meetings.

Young and "Messy" were nominated for 2026's Grammy Awards for Best New Artist and Best Pop Solo Performance; the latter won, making Young one of four Brit School alumni to win an award at the ceremony. She also won that year's Brit Award for British Breakthrough Artist in February and contributed a video message for the benefit concert Trans Mission in March. That May, "Messy" won a PRS for Music Most Performed Work trophy at the 71st Ivor Novello Awards and Young released "From Down Here" and an Apple Music-exclusive EP of live tracks performed for their Music Room series. She then collaborated with Campaign Against Living Miserably in September for a line of T-shirts containing lyrics from "Flicker of Light".

== Artistry and personal life ==
"I typically write a song on piano or guitar, then I put it down on voice memos in my phone and type it out in my notes app. [...] I never want to force writing, because once you force something it becomes very disjointed, and not intentional. Typically I have to have had a particular experience that inspired me or if not that, I have to be in the right frame of mind and to be feeling the song. If there is no inspiration it's hard to get something out of the thin air." [sic]

— Young in May 2020

Young wrote her early works and her works from This Wasn't Meant for You Anyway onwards as though she was talking to a friend, having been inspired to return to the writing practice after listening to SZA's Ctrl. She has also cited influence from Joni Mitchell, Prince, Frank Ocean, and Anderson .Paak. She stated in June 2024 that she grew up listening to a combination of hip-hop such as Eminem and "singer-songwriter-type stuff" such as Avril Lavigne and Bon Iver, before developing interest in older artists such as Prince and Michael Jackson. In an interview with Junkee, she described Arctic Monkeys' AM as an influence on This Wasn't Meant for You Anyway, though stated that she avoided bringing in references in favour of just making music "until something magic happens". Clash used their review of I'm Only F**king Myself to assert that they could hear influence from Leonard Cohen, Frank Ocean, and Radiohead in the album.

Young was diagnosed with attention deficit hyperactivity disorder after writing "Messy", a track she has described as "an ADHD anthem". In May 2025, she replied "I like p***y as well u kno" [sic] to a comment on a video on her TikTok account of her dancing to CMAT's "Take a Sexy Picture of Me". Multiple outlets interpreted Young's comment as her coming out as bisexual, though James Factora of Them argued that liking "p***y" did not necessarily constitute attraction to women. Young later discussed her bisexuality on I'm Only F**king Myself's opening track "F**k Everyone" [sic]. She said in May 2026 that she had returned to dating women after a sex session with a man was interrupted by his wife calling to ask for nappies and in September 2026 that she was struggling to breathe as a result of her vaping addiction. In October and November 2025, she filed but then withdrew a lawsuit against "Messy" producer Carter Lang after he claimed writing credits on four of her songs.

== Discography ==
=== Studio albums ===
| Title | Album details | Peak chart positions | | | | | | | | | | Certifications |
| Title | Album details | UK | AUT | BEL (FL) | CAN | DEN | FRA | GER | NLD | SWI | US | Certifications |
|---|---|---|---|---|---|---|---|---|---|---|---|---|
| My Mind Wanders and Sometimes Leaves Completely | Released: 26 May 2023; Label: Day One, Island; Format: CD, cassette, LP, digital download, streaming | — (Note: My Mind Wanders and Sometimes Leaves Completely did not enter the UK Albums Chart, but it peaked at number 40 on the UK Albums Sales Chart.) | — | — | — | — | — | — | — | — | — | |
| This Wasn't Meant for You Anyway | Released: 21 June 2024; Label: Day One, Island; Format: CD, LP, digital download, streaming | 16 | 43 | 25 | 38 | 28 | 41 | 12 | 12 | 53 | 64 | BRMA: Gold; SNEP: Gold |
| I'm Only F**king Myself | Release date: 19 September 2025; Label: Day One, Island; Format: CD, LP, cassette, digital download, streaming | 3 | 18 | 3 | — | — | 35 | 11 | 7 | 18 | 68 | |
"—" denotes album did not chart in that territory.

=== Extended plays ===
| Title | EP details |
|---|---|
| Intro | Released: 7 November 2019; Label: Day One, Island; Format: CD, digital download |
| Renaissance | Released: 28 April 2020; Label: Day One, Island; Format: Digital download, streaming |
| After Midnight | Released: 20 August 2021; Label: Day One, Island; Format: Digital download, streaming |

=== Singles ===
==== As lead artist ====
List of singles, with selected chart positions and certifications, showing year released and album name
| Title | Year | Peak chart positions | | | | | | | | | | Certifications | Album |
| Title | Year | UK | AUS | AUT | CAN | FRA | IRE | NZ | SWE | US | WW | Certifications | Album |
|---|---|---|---|---|---|---|---|---|---|---|---|---|---|
| "6 Feet Under" | 2019 | — | — | — | — | — | — | — | — | — | — | | Intro |
| "Pick Me Up" | 2020 | — | — | — | — | — | — | — | — | — | — | | Renaissance |
| "None for You" | 2020 | — | — | — | — | — | — | — | — | — | — | | Renaissance |
| "Woman" | 2020 | — | — | — | — | — | — | — | — | — | — | | Non-album singles |
| "Ruin My Make Up" | 2021 | — | — | — | — | — | — | — | — | — | — | | Non-album singles |
| "Bad Tattoo" | 2021 | — | — | — | — | — | — | — | — | — | — | | Non-album singles |
| "Blue (2AM)" | 2021 | — | — | — | — | — | — | — | — | — | — | | After Midnight |
| "Fake" | 2021 | — | — | — | — | — | — | — | — | — | — | | Non-album singles |
| "Together in Electric Dreams" | 2021 | — | — | — | — | — | — | — | — | — | — | | Non-album singles |
| "So Sorry" | 2022 | — (Note: "So Sorry" did not enter the UK Singles Chart, but peaked at number 34 on the UK Downloads Chart.) | — | — | — | — | — | — | — | — | — | | Non-album singles |
| "Stream of Consciousness" | 2022 | — | — | — | — | — | — | — | — | — | — | | My Mind Wanders and Sometimes Leaves Completely |
| "Annabel's House" | 2023 | — | — | — | — | — | — | — | — | — | — | | My Mind Wanders and Sometimes Leaves Completely |
| "Don't Hate Me" | 2023 | — | — | — | — | — | — | — | — | — | — | | My Mind Wanders and Sometimes Leaves Completely |
| "What Is It About Me" | 2023 | — | — | — | — | — | — | — | — | — | — | | My Mind Wanders and Sometimes Leaves Completely |
| "Money" | 2023 | — | — | — | — | — | — | — | — | — | — | | My Mind Wanders and Sometimes Leaves Completely |
| "Conceited" | 2023 | 63 | — | — | — | — | — | — | — | — | — | BPI: Silver | This Wasn't Meant for You Anyway |
| "Wish You Were Dead" | 2024 | — | — | — | — | — | — | — | — | — | — | | This Wasn't Meant for You Anyway |
| "Intrusive Thoughts" | 2024 | — | — | — | — | — | — | — | — | — | — | | This Wasn't Meant for You Anyway |
| "Big Brown Eyes" | 2024 | — | — | — | — | — | — | — | — | — | — | | This Wasn't Meant for You Anyway |
| "Fuck" | 2024 | — | — | — | — | — | — | — | — | — | — | | This Wasn't Meant for You Anyway |
| "Messy" | 2024 | 1 | 1 | 6 | 7 | 6 | 1 | 4 | 8 | 14 | 5 | BPI: 3× Platinum; ARIA: 5× Platinum; MC: 4× Platinum; RIAA: 2× Platinum; RMNZ: 3× Platinum; SNEP: Diamond | This Wasn't Meant for You Anyway |
| "Good Books" | 2024 | — | — | — | — | — | — | — | — | — | — | | This Wasn't Meant for You Anyway |
| "Flicker of Light" | 2024 | — | — | — | — | — | — | — | — | — | — | | EA Sports FC 25 |
| "Charlie" (featuring Lil Yachty) | 2024 | — | — | — | — | — | — | — | — | — | — | | Non-album single |
| "One Thing" | 2025 | 18 | 43 | — | 54 | — | 19 | 32 | — | — (Note: "One Thing" did not enter the Billboard Hot 100, but peaked at number 14 on the Bubbling Under Hot 100 chart.) | 132 | BPI: Gold; ARIA: Gold; MC: Gold; RMNZ: Gold | I'm Only F**king Myself |
| "Not Like That Anymore" | 2025 | — | — | — | — | — | — | — (Note: "Not Like That Anymore" did not enter the NZ Top 40 Singles Chart, but peaked at number 35 on the NZ Hot Singles Chart.) | — | — | — | | I'm Only F**king Myself |
| "D£aler" | 2025 | 27 | — | — | — | — | — | — (Note: "D£aler" did not enter the NZ Top 40 Singles Chart, but peaked at number 15 on the NZ Hot Singles Chart.) | — | — | — | BPI: Silver | I'm Only F**king Myself |
| "Spiders" | 2025 | 88 | — | — | — | — | — | — (Note: "Spiders" did not enter the NZ Top 40 Singles Chart, but peaked at number 21 on the NZ Hot Singles Chart.) | — | — | — | | I'm Only F**king Myself |
| "From Down Here" | 2026 | — | — | — | — | — | — | — (Note: "From Down Here" did not enter the NZ Top 40 Singles Chart, but peaked at number 11 on the NZ Hot Singles Chart.) | — | — | — | | TBA |
"—" denotes a recording that did not chart in that territory.

==== As featured artist ====
List of singles as featured artist, with selected chart positions and certifications, showing year released and album name
| Title | Year | Peak chart positions | | | | | | | | | Certifications | Album |
| Title | Year | UK | AUS | CAN | FRA | IRE | NZ | SWE Heat. | US | WW | Certifications | Album |
|---|---|---|---|---|---|---|---|---|---|---|---|---|
| "Outta My Mind Pt. 2" (Chlothegod featuring Lola Young) | 2024 | — | — | — | — | — | — | — | — | — | | Non-album single |
| "Like Him" (Tyler, the Creator featuring Lola Young) | 2024 | 30 | 55 | 43 | 147 | 28 | 28 | 16 | 29 | 37 | BPI: Gold; MC: Platinum; RIAA: 2× Platinum; RMNZ: Platinum; SNEP: Gold | Chromakopia |
"—" denotes a recording that did not chart in that territory.

=== Other charted songs ===
List of other charted songs, with selected chart positions, showing year released and album name
| Title | Year | Peak chart positions | | Album |
| Title | Year | UK | NZ Hot | Album |
|---|---|---|---|---|
| "Post Sex Clarity" | 2025 | 60 | 12 | I'm Only F**king Myself |

=== Guest appearances ===
List of guest appearances, showing year released and album name
| Title | Year | Album |
|---|---|---|
| "I Don't Mind" | 2024 | Bose x NME: C24 |

== Tours ==
- This Wasn't Meant For You Anyway Tour (2024–2025)
- US & Canada Tour 2025 (cancelled)
- UK & EU Tour 2025 (cancelled)
- EU Tour & London (2026)
- Everything Begins North American Tour (2027)

== Awards and nominations ==
| Organization | Year | Category | Recipient(s) | Result | Ref. |
|---|---|---|---|---|---|
| ASCAP London Music Awards | 2025 | Vanguard Award | Herself | Won | |
| BBC | 2021 | Sound of 2022 | Herself | Fourth | |
| Brit Awards | 2021 | Rising Star | Herself | Nominated | |
| Brit Awards | 2025 | British Pop Act | Herself | Nominated | |
| Brit Awards | 2026 | British Pop Act | Herself | Nominated | |
| Brit Awards | 2026 | Rock/Alternative Act | Herself | Nominated | |
| Brit Awards | 2026 | Song of the Year | "Messy" | Nominated | |
| Brit Awards | 2026 | Breakthrough Artist | Herself | Won | |
| Brit Awards | 2026 | Artist of the Year | Herself | Nominated | |
| Grammy Awards | 2026 | Best New Artist | Herself | Nominated | |
| Grammy Awards | 2026 | Best Pop Solo Performance | "Messy" | Won | |
| Ivor Novello Awards | 2025 | Best Album | This Wasn't Meant for You Anyway | Nominated | |
| Ivor Novello Awards | 2025 | Best Song Musically and Lyrically | "Messy" | Nominated | |
| Ivor Novello Awards | 2025 | Rising Star | Herself | Won | |
| Ivor Novello Awards | 2026 | PRS for Music most performed work | "Messy" | Nominated | |
| Nickelodeon Kids' Choice Awards | 2025 | Favorite Viral Song | "Messy" | Nominated | |
| TikTok Awards | 2025 | Artist of the Year | Herself | Nominated | |
| UK Music Video Awards | 2025 | Best Pop Video | "One Thing" | Nominated | |
