= All My Friends (Snakehips song) =

2015 single by Snakehips featuring Tinashe and Chance the Rapper

Single by Snakehips featuring Tinashe and Chance the Rapper

from the album All My Friends EP
- Released: 21 October 2015
- Genre: Alternative R&B
- Length: 3:47
- Label: Sony Music UK; Columbia; RCA
- Songwriters: Snakehips; Cass Lowe; Chance the Rapper
- Producers: Snakehips; Cass Lowe

Snakehips singles chronology
"Days with You" (2014)	"All My Friends" (2015)	"Money on Me" (2016)

Tinashe singles chronology
"Player" (2015)	"All My Friends" (2015)	"Just Say" (2016)

Chance the Rapper singles chronology
"Church" (2015)	"All My Friends" (2015)	"Angels" (2015)

Music video
- "All My Friends" on YouTube

"All My Friends" is a song by British production duo Snakehips, featuring American singer Tinashe and American rapper Chance the Rapper. It was released as a single on 21 October 2015 by Sony Music UK and Columbia Records. It won the Ivor Novello Award for Best Contemporary Song in May 2016.

== Background and composition ==
On Genius, Snakehips summarised the song: "We wanted to make something that had a classic hip-hop groove and gospel vibes but then have some modern more electronic sounds going on too. We made the beat and wrote the hook last year in London. We thought Tinashe and Chance would be the perfect vocalists for it and so we reached out to them. We never really expected to be able to make it happen as they were both huge artists doing their own thing, but they both were into it and we managed to put it all together. It was recorded in a few different places and we never all got into the studio at once just because everyone's schedules were so crazy!"

Regarding the chorus ("All my friends are wasted / And I hate this club, man I drink too much / Another Friday night I've wasted / My eyes are black and red, I'm crawling back to your bed"), the duo said: "We wrote the hook and came up with the concept with our writing partner Cass Lowe last year. We thought it would be cool to do an anti-party track that kinda sounded uplifting at the same time and had some gospel vibes to it. And yeah we've had a load of whack nights out in the past, I think it's something everyone can relate to."

In an interview with the Official Charts Company, Snakehips member Ollie Lee explained that the song is not about one particular story, but "really just about years of bad nights out... living in London!" When asked about how the collaboration came about, Lee continued, "I have no idea to be honest with you. We made the beat to the song last year and we really wanted Tinashe and Chance on the song. Honestly, they were our first choices for the track – they were two relatively new acts at the time and we both loved what they were doing. We just sent them the song and they both said they liked it. We couldn't believe that they'd even heard of us. I still can't believe it all worked out actually. The whole thing is sort of ridiculous..."

== Commercial performance ==
"All My Friends" debuted on the ARIA Singles Chart at number 27 on the chart date 21 December 2015. It eventually peaked at number 3.

In the United Kingdom, the song peaked at number 5 on the Official Singles Chart. The song also peaked at number 2 in New Zealand, number 7 in Scotland and number 15 in Ireland. The song marked Tinashe as her biggest track to perform successfully as a featured artist in UK and Australia.

== Music video ==
A music video for the track was released on 16 November 2015. It was directed by Mister Whitmore.

The video opens with Tinashe sitting on the edge of the roof of a building at night whilst singing her verse. It then cuts to a long queue to get into a nightclub and the shot continues panning to the left, where we see couples kissing, people throwing up and a young man in a snapback stumbling forward before sitting down and drinking out of a bag. The camera continues leftward until it reaches the front of the line (other than a new shot of Tinashe singing the bridge whilst sitting in the back of a taxi and wearing sunglasses). The bouncer, refusing to let anyone in, mouths "Fuck off!" at the camera in front of him.

Chance does not appear in the main video, but there is a director's cut that features him singing on a graphical screen, which the aforementioned guy in the snapback sees and is amazed by.

== Live performances ==
On 25 February 2016, Snakehips, Chance the Rapper and Tinashe performed the track on Jimmy Kimmel Live. In April, Snakehips performed the song live with Tinashe at Coachella.

== Charts ==
=== Weekly charts ===
Chart (2015–16)	Peak position
Australia (ARIA)	3
Belgium (Ultratop 50 Flanders)	25
Belgium (Ultratip Bubbling Under Wallonia)	25
Canada Hot 100 (Billboard)	82
Denmark (Tracklisten)	34
Germany (GfK)	67
Hungary (Stream Top 40)	33
Ireland (IRMA)	15
Italy (FIMI)	91
Netherlands (Dutch Top 40)	25
Netherlands (Single Top 100)	29
New Zealand (Recorded Music NZ)	2
Norway (VG-lista)	25
Scotland (Official Charts Company)	7
Sweden (Sverigetopplistan)	55
Switzerland (Schweizer Hitparade)	54
UK Singles (Official Charts)	5
US Bubbling Under Hot 100 (Billboard)	3
US Dance Club Songs (Billboard)	2
US Hot R&B/Hip-Hop Songs (Billboard)	34

=== Year-end charts ===
Chart (2016)	Position
Australia (ARIA)	39
Netherlands (Single Top 100)	98
New Zealand (Recorded Music NZ)	14
UK Singles (Official Charts Company)	40

== Certifications ==
Region	Certification	Certified units/sales
Australia (ARIA)	3× Platinum	210,000^{‡}
Canada (Music Canada)	Platinum	80,000^{‡}
Denmark (IFPI Danmark)	Platinum	90,000^{‡}
Germany (BVMI)	Gold	200,000^{‡}
Italy (FIMI)	Gold	25,000^{‡}
Mexico (AMPROFON)	Gold	30,000^{‡}
Netherlands (NVPI)	Platinum	30,000^{‡}
New Zealand (RMNZ)	6× Platinum	180,000^{‡}
Poland (ZPAV)	Gold	10,000^{‡}
Sweden (GLF)	Platinum	40,000^{‡}
Switzerland (IFPI Switzerland)	Gold	15,000^{‡}
United Kingdom (BPI)	2× Platinum	1,200,000^{‡}
United States (RIAA)	Platinum	1,000,000^{‡}
^{‡} Sales+streaming figures based on certification alone.

== Release history ==
Region	Date	Format	Label	Ref.
United Kingdom	21 October 2015	Digital download	Sony UK; Columbia	
United States	2 February 2016	Dance radio	RCA	
United States	29 March 2016	Rhythmic contemporary	RCA	
United States	29 March 2016	Contemporary hit radio	RCA	
