= Snakehips (duo) =

British electronic music duo

- Snakehips in 2019

Background information
- Origin: Sheffield, South Yorkshire, United Kingdom
- Genres: Electronic; R&B
- Years active: 2012–present
- Labels: Hoffman West; Columbia; Sony; RCA
- Members: Oliver Lee; James Carter
- Website: snakehipsmusic.com

Snakehips are a British electronic music duo. The line-up consists of Oliver Lee and James Carter. Snakehips made their name with Hype Machine doing remixes for Banks, The Weeknd, Bondax and Wild Belle. They are best known for their 2015 single, "All My Friends" featuring Tinashe and Chance the Rapper.

== Early life ==
Oliver Lee was educated at the Skinners' School, in Tunbridge Wells. Oliver Lee started out in music at a young age in the late 2000s, playing a variety of instruments, from keyboard to tambourine, for mariachi bands. He paid his dues whilst in the band, with his repertoire consisting of popular covers of hits from the era, a practice typical for the time.

The pair crossed paths in Hong Kong in summer 2012, whilst working on separate projects at notable sake bar, Sake Bar Ginn. They bonded over similar music tastes and agreed to meet again to discuss all things music before the trip was over. Both Carter and Lee forgot this engagement; as luck would have it however, the pair were reconnected on a flight travelling to London and agreed to work together in the studio. After success working in the studio with Jane and Jeff Purse, the two decided to call their project Snakehips.

== Career ==
=== 2014–2015: Breakthrough and All My Friends ===
They released their debut single, "Days with You" in August 2014. The song features vocals from British singer Sinead Harnett. They released their debut EP, Forever, Pt. II in March 2015. In October 2015, they released the single "All My Friends". The song features vocals from American singer Tinashe and American hip hop recording artist Chance the Rapper. The song peaked at number 5 on the UK Singles Chart.

=== 2016–present ===
Through 2016 and 2017, the duo released "Cruel", which featured the vocals of former One Direction singer, Zayn Malik. The single debuted in the UK chart at number 38 and hit its peak at number 33 a week later, making it the duo's second top 40 single. The next single "Don't Leave" featured MØ and also charted in the top 40, peaking at number 27. In 2019, they released “Gucci Rock n Rolla”, which featured vocals of Weezer frontman Rivers Cuomo, and KYLE. On May 5, 2023, the duo released their debut studio album never worry, featuring guest appearances from Daya, EarthGang, BIA, Lucky Daye, Duckwrth, Tinashe, Kilo Kish, Nicole Millar, MadeinTYO, Rochelle Jordan, Tkay Maidza, AG Club and Bryce Vine. On July 28, 2023, the duo released the deluxe version of never worry, featuring a guest appearance from Muni Long.

They collaborated with Canadian rapper DijahSB for the track "Pipe Down" in 2025. "Pipe Down" made into the official video game soundtrack for Forza Horizon 6 in 2026.

== Discography ==
- Never Worry (2023)

== Nominations ==
- 2016: Berlin Music Video Awards, Best Art Director for 'FOREVER (PT II) '
