= List of Escape the Fate band members =

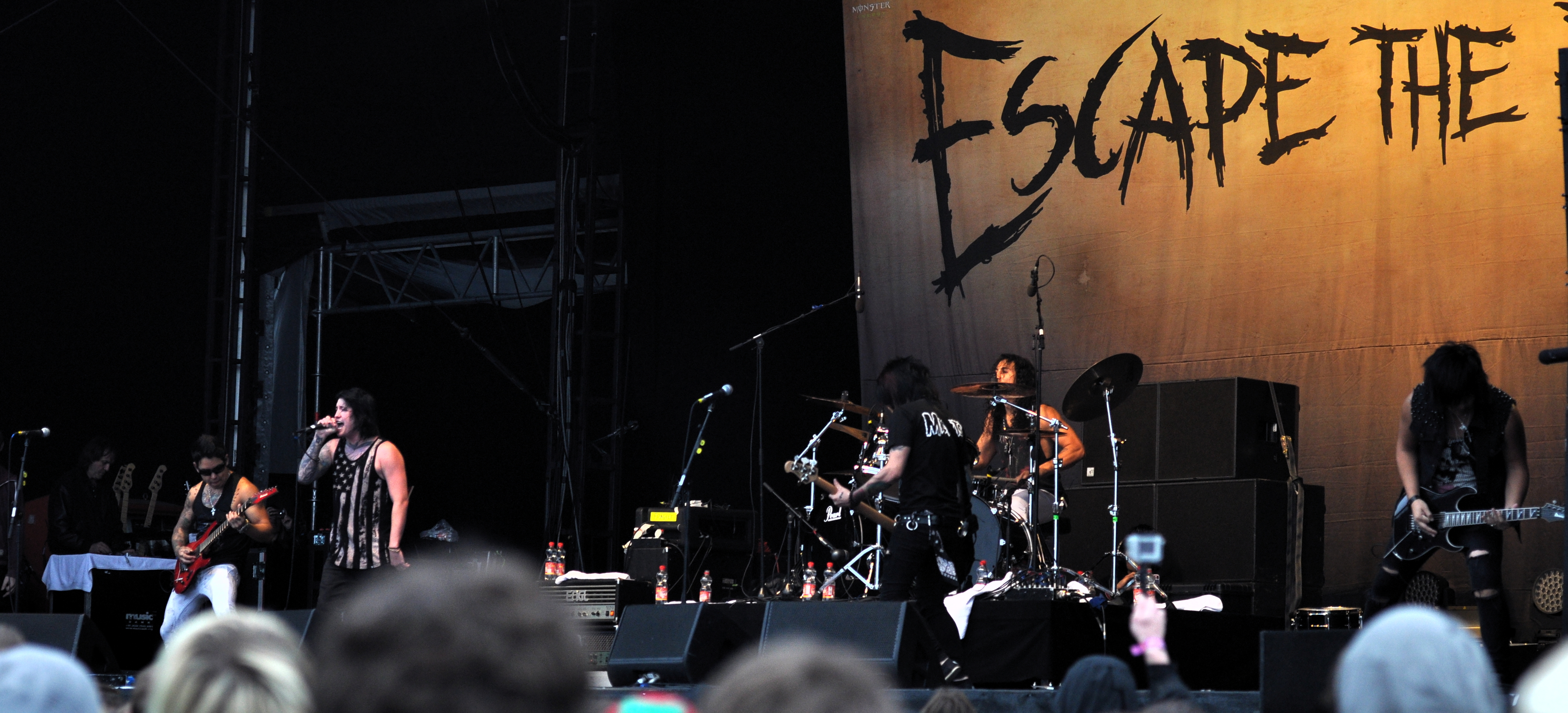
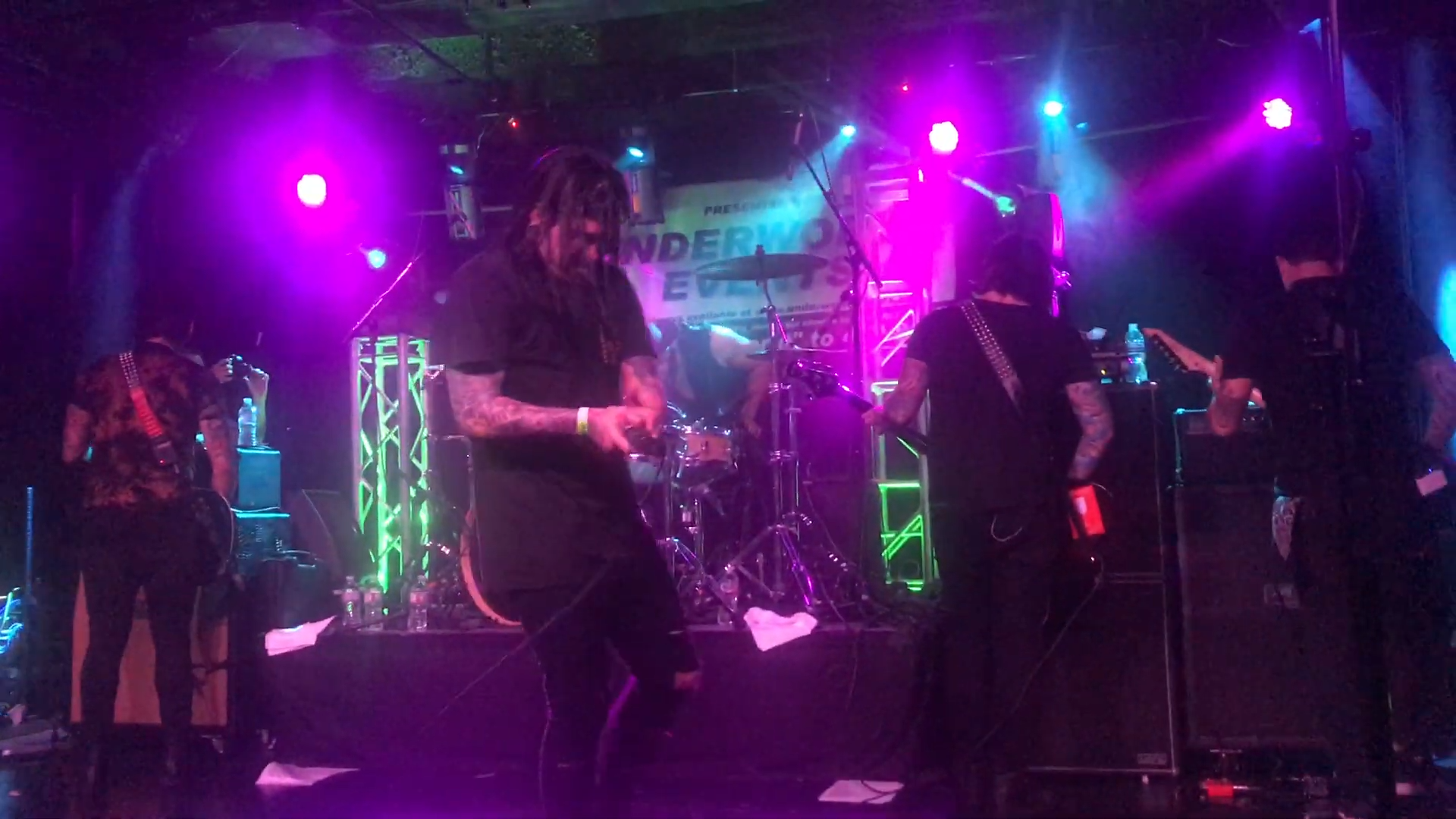
Escape the Fate performing in 2013 and 2017

Escape the Fate is an American rock band from Las Vegas, Nevada, formed in 2005 and originally from Pahrump, Nevada. The group consists of drummer Robert Ortiz, vocalist Craig Mabbitt, rhythm guitarist and bassist Erik Jensen, and lead guitarist Matti Hoffman. The group was founded by original vocalist Ronnie Radke, bassist Max Green, and lead guitarist Monte Money. The band has had 11 official members and 7 touring members and throughout 2010–2022 had a fluctuating lineup and has recorded eight albums with five different studio lineups.

== History ==
The band had their first lineup change when keyboardist and backing vocalist Carson Allen, left before the band's first studio album Dying Is Your Latest Fashion, and lead guitarist Monte Money started playing keyboards along with guitar instead of getting a new keyboardist. The band's next lineup change came when rhythm guitarist Omar Espinosa left and was replaced by Monte Money's brother, Michael Money as a touring member and Monte played the rhythm guitar on records.

Later, Ronnie Radke was involved in an altercation in Las Vegas that resulted in the fatal shooting of 18-year-old Michael Cook. While Radke did not shoot Cook, he was indicted on battery charges, while the man who shot Cook claimed self-defense. These charges against Radke, combined with Ronnie's past troubles with narcotics and rehab, led to a sentence of five years' probation. Radke failed to report to his parole officer and was arrested in June 2008, where he was sentenced to two years in prison. Radke was officially fired from Escape the Fate in mid-2008. Radke was then replaced by former blessthefall vocalist, Craig Mabbitt.

The band's next lineup change would come in late 2011 when the Money brothers and Max Green went on hiatus and were replaced by touring members Kevin "Thrasher" Gruft on lead guitar, TJ Bell on rhythm guitar and Zakk Sandler on bass. It was not an official departure at the time as the Money brother would return but Max Green would make his departure permanent. TJ Bell would then become an official member and switch to bass. In 2013 the band recorded their first album without Green and with Bell on bass. Later that year Monte and Michael would leave the band. TJ then switched back to rhythm guitar, Kevin Gruft re-joined the band as a permanent member on lead guitar and Max Green returned to the band on bass. In 2014 Green would leave once more, joining former vocalist Ronnie Radke's band Falling in Reverse, and left that band months after joining. Since 2014, the band has gone through a string of touring bassists who include Davey Richmond (2014), Alex Torres (2014–2015), Tyler Burgess (2015), Max Georgiev (2015–2017) and Erik Jensen since 2017. With the band not having an official bassist, Gruft played bass in addition to lead guitar and keyboards on Hate Me (2015) to Chemical Warfare (2021).

The band line-up next changed in late 2021, as Robert Ortiz and Kevin "Thrasher" Gruft went on hiatus and were replaced by touring members Blake Bailey on drums and Matti Hoffman on lead guitar. Robert Ortiz returned after recovering from injury, but Kevin "Thrasher" Gruft did not confirm his departure, and the band subsequently removed him from their social pages and added Erik Jensen as permanent bassist after 5 years touring with the band. Matti Hoffman was also added as the new lead guitarist.

== Official members ==
=== Current ===
Image	Name	Years active	Instruments	Release contributions
	Robert Ortiz	2004–present	drums; occasional backing vocals	all Escape the Fate releases
	Craig Mabbitt	2008–present	lead vocals	all Escape the Fate releases from This War Is Ours (2008) to present
	Erik Jensen	2021–present (touring 2017–2021)	rhythm guitar (2025–present); bass; backing vocals	all Escape the Fate releases from Out of the Shadows (2023) to present
	Matti Hoffman	2021–present	lead guitar	all Escape the Fate releases from Out of the Shadows (2023) to present

=== Former ===
Image	Name	Years active	Instruments	Release contributions
	Monte Money	2004–2013	lead guitar; rhythm guitar; keyboards; backing vocals	all Escape the fate releases from Escape the Fate (EP) (2005) to Ungrateful (2013)
	Max Green	2004–2012; 2013–2014	bass; backing vocals	all Escape the Fate releases from Escape the Fate (EP) (2005) to Escape the Fate (2010)
	Ronnie Radke	2004–2008	lead vocals	all Escape the Fate releases from Escape the Fate (EP) (2005) to Situations (EP) (2007)
	Omar Espinosa	2004–2007	rhythm guitar; backing vocals	all Escape the Fate releases from Escape the Fate (EP) (2005) to Dying Is Your Latest Fashion (2006)
	Carson Allen	2005–2006	keyboards; vocals	all Escape the Fate releases from Escape the Fate (EP) (2005) to Dying Is Your Latest Fashion (2006)
	Michael Money	2012–2013 (touring 2007–2011)	rhythm guitar	all Escape the Fate releases from Escape the Fate (2010) to Ungrateful (2013)
	TJ Bell	2012–2025 (touring 2011–2012)	rhythm guitar (2011–2012, 2013–2025); bass (2012–2013, 2014–2015); backing vocals	all Escape the Fate release from Ungrateful (2013) to Out of the Shadows (2023)
	Kevin "Thrasher" Gruft	2013–2021 (touring 2011–2012)	lead guitar; bass (studio 2014–2021); keyboards; backing vocals	all releases from Acoustic Sessions (EP) (2014) to Chemical Warfare (2021)

== Other contributors ==
=== Touring ===
Image	Name	Years active	Instruments
	Zakk Sandler	2011–2012	bass; backing vocals
	Davey Richmond	2014	bass; backing vocals
	Alex Torres	2014–2015	bass; backing vocals
	Tyler Burgess	2015	bass; backing vocals
	Max Georgiev	2015–2017	bass; backing vocals
	Blake Bailey	2021–2022	drums; percussion

=== Session ===
Image	Name	Years active	Instruments	Release contributions
	Michael Baskette	2005–2007	keyboards; production; additional writing	all Escape the Fate releases from There's No Sympathy For The Dead (EP) (2006) to Situations (EP) (2007)
	Dave Holdredge	2006	cello	Dying Is Your Latest Fashion (2006)
	Matt Appleton	2008	keyboards; synthesizers; horn; ukulele; charango; vocals	This War Is Ours (2008)
	Kyle Moorman	2008	kalimba	This War Is Ours (2008)
	Jess Neilson	2008	flute	This War Is Ours (2008)
	John Feldmann	2008–2013; 2020–2021	keyboards; percussion; programming; mixing; production; additional vocals; additional writing	This War Is Ours (2008); Ungrateful (2013); Chemical Warfare (2021)
	John 5	2010	lead guitar; additional writing	Escape the Fate (2010)
	Bart Hendrickson	2010	keyboards; programming	Escape the Fate (2010)
	Howard Benson	2015–2018	production; programming; arranger; mixing; keyboards; additional writing	Hate Me (2015); I Am Human (2018)
	Brandon Saller	2013–2021	production; drums; additional vocals; additional writing	Ungrateful (2013); Chemical Warfare (2021)
	Travis Barker	2021	drums; additional writing	Chemical Warfare (2021)

== Line-ups ==
Period	Members	Studio and live releases
2004 – 2006	Ronnie Radke – lead vocals; Monte Money – lead guitar, backing vocals; Omar Espinosa – rhythm guitar, backing vocals; Max Green – bass, vocals; Robert Ortiz – drums, backing vocals; Carson Allen – keyboards, backing vocals	none
2006 – November 2007	Ronnie Radke – lead vocals; Monte Money – lead guitar, backing vocals, keyboards; Omar Espinosa – rhythm guitar, backing vocals; Max Green – bass, vocals; Robert Ortiz – drums, backing vocals	There's No Sympathy for the Dead (2006); Dying Is Your Latest Fashion (2006); Situations EP (2007)
November 2007 – mid 2008	Ronnie Radke – lead vocals; Monte Money – lead and rhythm guitar, backing vocals, keyboards; Max Green – bass, vocals; Robert Ortiz – drums, backing vocals; Michael Money – rhythm guitar (touring)	none
mid 2008 – late 2011	Monte Money – lead and rhythm guitar, backing vocals, keyboards; Max Green – bass, vocals; Robert Ortiz – drums, backing vocals; Michael Money – rhythm guitar (touring); Craig Mabbitt – lead vocals	This War Is Ours (2008); Escape the Fate (2010); Issues Remixes EP (2011)
late 2011 – 2012	Robert Ortiz – drums, backing vocals; Craig Mabbitt – lead vocals; Kevin "Thrasher" Gruft – lead guitar backing vocals (touring); TJ Bell – rhythm guitar, backing vocals (touring); Zakk Sandler – bass, backing vocals (touring)	none
2012 – October 2013	Robert Ortiz – drums, backing vocals; Craig Mabbitt – lead vocals; TJ Bell – bass, backing vocals; Monte Money – lead guitar, backing vocals, keyboards; Michael Money – rhythm guitar	Ungrateful (2013)
October 2013 – May 2014	Robert Ortiz – drums, backing vocals; Craig Mabbitt – lead vocals; TJ Bell – rhythm guitar, backing vocals; Kevin "Thrasher" Gruft – lead guitar backing vocals, keyboards; Max Green – bass, backing vocals	Hate Me (2015)
May 2014 – late 2014	Robert Ortiz – drums, backing vocals; Craig Mabbitt – lead vocals; TJ Bell – rhythm guitar, backing vocals, studio bass; Kevin "Thrasher" Gruft – lead guitar backing vocals, keyboards, studio bass; Davey Richmond – bass, backing vocals (touring)	Hate Me (2015)
late 2014 – 2015	Robert Ortiz – drums, backing vocals; Craig Mabbitt – lead vocals; TJ Bell – rhythm guitar, backing vocals, studio bass; Kevin "Thrasher" Gruft – lead guitar backing vocals, keyboards, studio bass; Alex Torres – bass, backing vocals (touring)	Hate Me (2015)
2015	Robert Ortiz – drums, backing vocals; Craig Mabbitt – lead vocals; TJ Bell – rhythm guitar, backing vocals, studio bass; Kevin "Thrasher" Gruft – lead guitar backing vocals, keyboards, studio bass; Tyler Burgess – bass, backing vocals (touring)	Hate Me (2015)
2015 – 2017	Robert Ortiz – drums, backing vocals; Craig Mabbitt – lead vocals; TJ Bell – rhythm guitar, backing vocals; Kevin "Thrasher" Gruft – lead guitar backing vocals, keyboards, studio bass; Max Georgiev – bass, backing vocals (touring)	I Am Human (2018); Chemical Warfare (2021)
2017 – 2021	Robert Ortiz – drums, backing vocals; Craig Mabbitt – lead vocals; TJ Bell – rhythm guitar, backing vocals; Kevin "Thrasher" Gruft – lead guitar backing vocals, keyboards, studio bass; Erik Jensen – bass, backing vocals (touring)	I Am Human (2018); Chemical Warfare (2021)
2021 – 2022	Craig Mabbitt – lead vocals; TJ Bell – rhythm guitar, backing vocals; Erik Jensen – bass, backing vocals (touring); Matti Hoffman – lead guitar (touring); Blake Bailey – drums (touring)	none
2022 – 2025	Craig Mabbitt – lead vocals; TJ Bell – rhythm guitar, backing vocals; Erik Jensen – bass, backing vocals; Matti Hoffman – lead guitar; Robert Ortiz – drums, backing vocals	Out of the Shadows (2023)
2025 – present	Craig Mabbitt – lead vocals; Erik Jensen – rhythm guitar, bass, backing vocals; Matti Hoffman – lead guitar; Robert Ortiz – drums, backing vocals	none
