= Escape the Fate discography =

American rock band discography

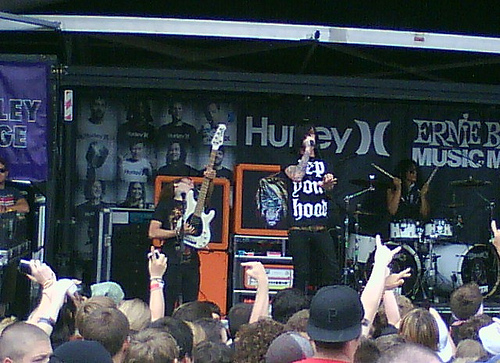
- Escape the Fate playing at Warped Tour in 2009.
- Studio albums: 8
- Extended plays: 4
- Singles: 36
- Music videos: 34

The American rock band Escape the Fate has released eight studio albums, three extended plays, one demo, thirty-six singles, and thirty-four music videos.

== Studio albums ==
List of studio albums, with selected details, chart positions and sales
Year	Album details	Peak chart positions						Sales	Certifications
Year	Album details	US	US Rock	AUS	CAN	GER	UK	Sales	Certifications
2006	Dying Is Your Latest Fashion: Released: September 26, 2006; Label: Epitaph	—	—	99	—	—	—	US: 168,000+	RIAA: Gold
2008	This War Is Ours: Released: October 21, 2008; Label: Epitaph	35	12	33	—	—	—	US: 13,000	
2010	Escape the Fate: Released: November 2, 2010; Label: DGC/Interscope	25	4	58	—	—	145		
2013	Ungrateful: Released: May 14, 2013; Label: Eleven Seven Music	27	7	34	—	—	—		
2015	Hate Me: Released: October 30, 2015; Label: Eleven Seven Music	58	—	32	84	—	—		
2018	I Am Human: Released: March 30, 2018; Label: Better Noise Music	—	43	39	—	—	—	US: 3,605	
2021	Chemical Warfare: Released: April 16, 2021; Label: Better Noise Music	—	—	—	—	94	—		
2023	Out of the Shadows: Released: September 1, 2023; Label: Big Noise	—	—	—	—	–	—		
2026	The Last Goodbye: Released: October 2, 2026; Label: Big Noise	—	—	—	—	–	—		

== Extended plays ==
List of EPs, with selected details
Year	Details
2005	Escape the Fate: Released: 2005; Label: Self-released
2006	There's No Sympathy for the Dead: Released: May 23, 2006; Label: Epitaph
2007	Situations EP: Released: 2007; Label: Epitaph
2011	Issues Remixes EP: Released: January 11, 2011; Label: Interscope, DGC

== Singles ==
List of singles, with selected chart positions
Year	Song	Peak chart positions			Certifications	Album
Year	Song	US Alt.	US Main.	US Rock	Certifications	Album
2005	"Not Good Enough for Truth in Cliché" (demo)	—	—	×		Escape the Fate (Demo)
2006	"There's No Sympathy for the Dead"	—	—	×		There's No Sympathy for the Dead
2006	"Not Good Enough for Truth in Cliché"	—	—	×		Dying Is Your Latest Fashion
2007	"Situations"	—	—	×		Dying Is Your Latest Fashion
2008	"The Flood"	—	—	×		This War Is Ours
2009	"Something"	—	—	×		This War Is Ours
2009	"10 Miles Wide"	—	—	×		This War Is Ours
2010	"This War Is Ours (The Guillotine II)"	—	—	—		This War Is Ours
2010	"Massacre"	—	—	—		Escape the Fate
2010	"Issues"	29	23	33		Escape the Fate
2011	"Gorgeous Nightmare"	—	36	—		Escape the Fate
2013	"Ungrateful"	—	—	—		Ungrateful
2013	"You're Insane"	—	25	—		Ungrateful
2013	"One for the Money"	—	11	20	RIAA: Platinum	Ungrateful
2014	"Picture Perfect"	—	31	—		Ungrateful
2015	"Just a Memory"	—	—	—		Hate Me
2015	"Remember Every Scar"	—	24	—		Hate Me
2015	"Les Enfants Terribles"	—	—	—		Hate Me
2015	"Alive"	—	25	—		Hate Me
2017	"Empire"	—	—	—		I Am Human
2017	"Do You Love Me"	—	—	—		I Am Human
2018	"Broken Heart"	—	15	—		I Am Human
2018	"Digging My Own Grave"	—	—	—		I Am Human
2018	"I Am Human"	—	—	—		I Am Human
2020	"Walk On"	—	—	—		Chemical Warfare
2020	"Invincible" (featuring Lindsey Stirling)	—	13	—		Chemical Warfare
2021	"Not My Problem" (featuring Travis Barker)	—	—	—		Chemical Warfare
2021	"Unbreakable"	—	—	—		Chemical Warfare
2023	"H8 My Self"	—	—	—		Out of the Shadows
2023	"Low"	—	—	—		Out of the Shadows
2023	"Cheers to Goodbye" (featuring Spencer Charnas)	—	—	—		Out of the Shadows
2024	"Dearly Departed" (featuring Bert McCracken)	—	—	—		Out of the Shadows
2024	"M.O.N.S.T.E.R"	—	—	—		Non-album single
2026	"Déjà Vu"	—	—	—		The Last Goodbye
2026	"Idle Potential"	—	—	—		The Last Goodbye
2026	"Paranoia"	—	—	—		The Last Goodbye
"—" denotes the single failed to chart, or not released. "×" denotes periods where charts did not exist or were not archived.

== Album appearances ==
Year	Song	Album
2009	"Smooth"	Punk Goes Pop 2
2014	"Give Me Novacaine"	Kerrang! Does Green Day's American Idiot
2016	"Hallowed Be Thy Name'"	Kerrang! Maiden Heaven: Volume 2
2016	"Dead!"	Rock Sound Presents: The Black Parade

== Music videos ==
Year	Song	Director
2005	"Not Good Enough for Truth in Cliché" (demo)	J. Reyes
2006	"There's No Sympathy for the Dead"	
2007	"Not Good Enough for Truth in Cliché"	
2007	"Situations"	Zach Merck
2008	"The Flood"	Zach Merck
2009	"Something"	Zach Merck
2009	"10 Miles Wide"	Elliot Dillman
2010	"This War Is Ours (The Guillotine II)"	Elliot Dillman
2010	"Issues"	P. R. Brown
2010	"City of Sin"	Robby Starbuck
2011	"Gorgeous Nightmare"	Robby Starbuck
2013	"Ungrateful"	Frankie Nasso
2013	"You're Insane"	Frankie Nasso
2013	"One for the Money"	
2014	"Picture Perfect"	Frankie Nasso
2015	"Just a Memory"	Dale "Rage" Resteghini
2015	"Alive"	Dale "Rage" Resteghini and Craig Mabbitt
2016	"Remember Every Scar"	Robyn August
2016	"Les Enfants Terribles (The Terrible Children)"	Britt Boyce
2016	"Breaking Me Down"	Orie McGinness
2018	"Broken Heart"	Frankie Nasso
2018	"I Am Human"	Robyn August
2019	"Do You Love Me?"	Robyn August
2020	"Walk On"	
2020	"Invincible"	Samuel Gonzalez Jr.
2020	"Christmas Song"	Jacob Reynolds
2021	"Not My Problem"	Mooch
2021	"Lightning Strike"	Mooch
2023	"H8 MY SELF"	Orie McGinness
2023	"LOW"	Jacob Reynolds
2023	"Cheers to Goodbye"	Jacob Reynolds
2024	"Dearly Departed"	Matthew Duncan
2026	"Last Goodbye"	Nick Gaiski and Elliot Gruenberg
2026	"Paranoia"	Nick Gaiski

== Other appearances ==
Year	Song	Work
2006	"Reverse This Curse"	Tony Hawk's Downhill Jam

== Notes ==
- "Escape the Fate Discography". Billboard.
- "Escape the Fate Discography". AllMusic.
- "MTV – Escape the Fate". MTV.
