= Ungrateful Dead =

The Ungrateful Dead is the 2013 season 3 premiere of the TV show Grimm, 45th overall TV episode

Ungrateful Dead may also refer to:

- Ungrateful Dead (play), a 1993 stage play by Parv Bancil
- Ungrateful Dead (story), a 2008 short story by Kelley Armstrong set in Otherworld; see Women of the Otherworld

== See also ==
- Grateful dead (disambiguation)
- Ungrateful (disambiguation)
- Dead (disambiguation)
