= List of artists who reached number one on the U.S. Mainstream Rock chart =

This is an alphabetical list of artists who reached the number one position on the United States Billboard Mainstream Rock chart, which has been active since 1981. The number in parentheses indicates the total of number-one hits for that band on this chart.

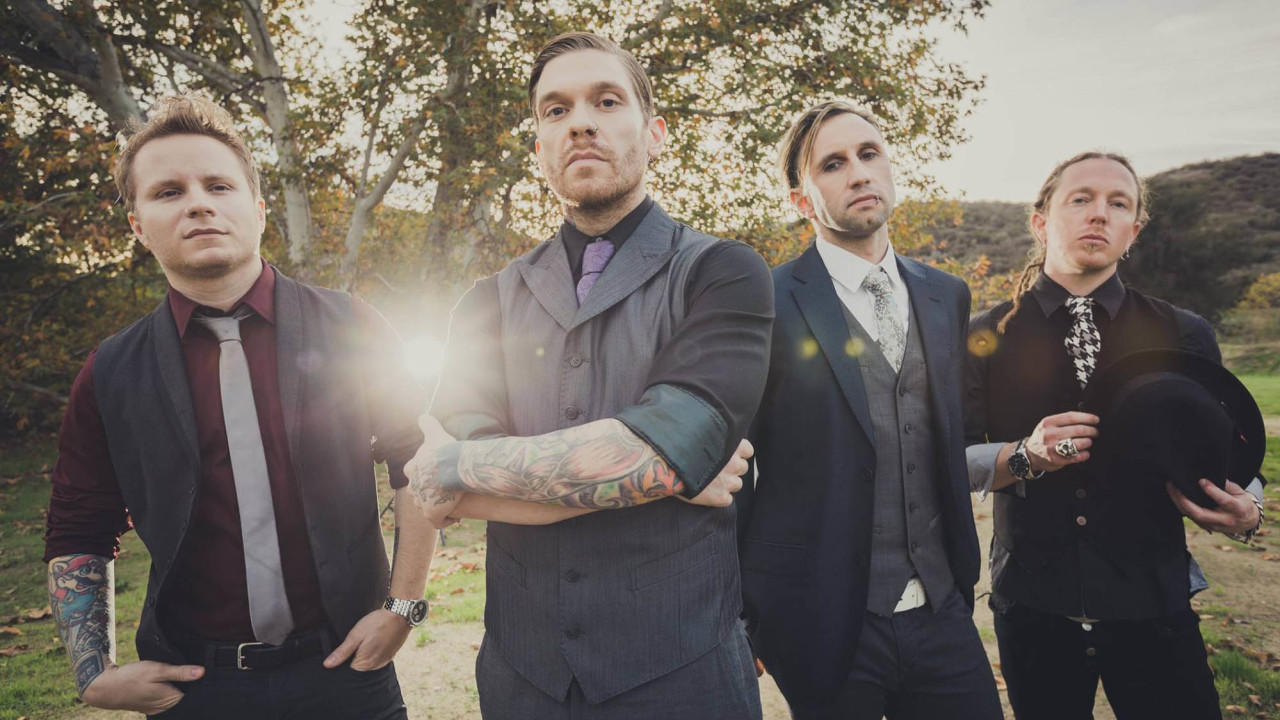
With a total of 24 songs, Shinedown hold the record for the most number ones.

== 0-9 ==
- 3 Doors Down (5)
- Johnny 3 Tears (1)
- John 5
- .38 Special (2)

== A ==
- AC/DC (5)
- Bryan Adams (2)
- Adelitas Way (1)
- Aerosmith (9)
- Alice in Chains (5)
- All Good Things (1)
- The Allman Brothers Band (1)
- All That Remains (1)
- Alter Bridge (1)
- Apocalyptica (1)
- Architects (2)
- Asia (2)
- Asking Alexandria (2)
- Audioslave (2)
- Avatar (1)
- Avenged Sevenfold (3)

== B ==
- Bad Company (2)
- Badflower (2)
- Bad Omens (3)
- Bad Wolves (4)
- Babymetal (1)
- Beartooth (2)
- Jeff Beck (1)
- Pat Benatar (1)
- Chester Bennington (1)
- The Black Crowes (6)
- The Black Keys (1)
- Blind Melon (1)
- Blue Öyster Cult (1)
- Bon Jovi (2)
- Jon Bon Jovi (1)
- Boston (1)
- Breaking Benjamin (9)
- Bring Me the Horizon (1)
- Maria Brink (1)
- Brother Cane (2)
- Buckcherry (1)

== C ==
- John Cafferty (2)
- The Call (1)
- Matt Cameron (1)
- The Cars (3)
- Cavo (1)
- Spencer Carnas (1)
- Chevelle (6)
- Eric Clapton (5)
- Collective Soul (7)
- Phil Collins (1)
- Chris Cornell (2)
- David Coverdale (1)
- Creed (4)
- Cry of Love (1)

== D ==
- Damn Yankees (1)
- Daughtry (4)
- Days of the New (2)
- Daysleeper (1)
- Def Leppard (5)
- Deftones (1)
- Device (1)
- Dire Straits (2)
- Dirty Honey (1)
- Disturbed (13)
- DMX (1)
- The Doobie Brothers (2)
- David Draiman (1)
- Duran Duran (1)
- Fred Durst (1)

== E ==
- Eurythmics (1)
- Evanescence (2)
- Everclear (1)
- Everlast (1)
- Extreme (1)

== F ==
- Falco (1)
- Falling in Reverse (4)
- Neil Fallon (1)
- Five Finger Death Punch (18)
- Finger Eleven (1)
- The Firm (2)
- The Fixx (3)
- John Fogerty (1)
- Foreigner (4)
- Foo Fighters (17)
- Glenn Frey (1)
- From Ashes to New (2)
- The Funeral Portrait (3)

== G ==
- Peter Gabriel (4)
- The J. Geils Band (1)
- Genesis (2)
- Ghost (4)
- Brantley Gilbert (1)
- The Glorious Sons (2)
- Godsmack (13)
- Golden Earring (1)
- Goo Goo Dolls (1)
- Mckenna Grace (1)
- Lou Gramm (1)
- The Grateful Dead (1)
- Green Day (9)
- Greta Van Fleet (5)
- Skylar Grey (1)

== H ==
- Rob Halford (1)
- Sammy Hagar (2)
- Halestorm (7)
- Heart (1)
- Don Henley (4)
- Highly Suspect (3)
- Bruce Hornsby (2)

== I ==
- Ice Nine Kills (1)
- Billy Idol (1)
- INXS (1)
- I Prevail (3)

== J ==
- Mick Jagger (2)
- Jefferson Starship (1)
- Jet (1)
- Joan Jett (1)
- Ayron Jones (2)
- Danko Jones (1)
- Journey (1)

== K ==
- Myles Kennedy (2)
- Kiss (1)
- Korn (1)
- Lenny Kravitz (2)
- Chad Kroeger (2)

== L ==
- Courtney LaPlante (1)
- Amy Lee (1)
- Aaron Lewis (1)
- Huey Lewis and the News (3)
- Linkin Park (13)
- Little Feat (2)
- Live (1)

== M ==
- Mammoth WVH (4)
- Richard Marx (1)
- Brian May (1)
- Christine McVie (1)
- Meat Loaf (1)
- John Mellencamp (7)
- Men at Work (1)
- Metallica (14)
- Toby Morse (1)
- Mudvayne (1)
- Steve Miller Band (1)
- Eddie Money (3)
- The Moody Blues (1)
- Ivan Moody (1)
- Tom Morello (1)
- The Motels (1)
- Motionless in White (2)
- Mr. Mister (1)
- Muse (1)
- Alannah Myles (1)
- My Darkest Days (1)

== N ==
- Nickelback (9)
- Stevie Nicks (2)
- Ninth Key (1)
- Nirvana (1)
- Randy Newman (1)
- Nothing More (5)

== O ==
- Ric Ocasek (1)
- The Offspring (3)
- Ozzy Osbourne (4)

== P ==
- Jimmy Page (1)
- Robert Palmer (2)
- Papa Roach (13)
- Pearl Jam (5)
- A Perfect Circle (2)
- Steve Perry (1)
- Tom Petty (4)
- Tom Petty and the Heartbreakers (6)
- Pierce the Veil
- Pink Floyd (3)
- Robert Plant (6)
- The Police (3)
- Pop Evil (8)
- Poppy (1)
- The Pretenders (2)
- The Pretty Reckless (9)
- Prism (1)
- Puddle of Mudd (5)

== Q ==
- Quarterflash (1)
- Queensrÿche (1)

== R ==
- Rainbow (1)
- Rakim (1)
- Red Hot Chili Peppers (6)
- R.E.M. (3)
- Red Sun Rising (2)
- The Replacements (1)
- Rise Against (1)
- Rival Sons (1)
- Jelly Roll (4)
- The Rolling Stones (5)
- David Lee Roth (1)
- Royal Blood (4)
- Rush (5)

== S ==
- Saving Abel (1)
- Charlie Scene (1)
- Scorpions (1)
- Seether (10)
- Bob Seger (2)
- Seven Mary Three (1)
- Kenny Wayne Shepherd (2)
- Shinedown (24)
- Silverchair (1)
- Simple Minds (1)
- Sixx:A.M. (1)
- Skillet (1)
- Slade (1)
- Slash (2)
- Sleep Theory (3)
- The Smashing Pumpkins (1)
- The Smithereens (1)
- Snow Patrol (1)
- Soundgarden (6)
- Spacehog (1)
- Bruce Springsteen (5)
- Billy Squier (2)
- Staind (5)
- Starship (1)
- Rod Stewart (1)
- Sting (3)
- Stone Sour (4)
- Stone Temple Pilots (7)
- Nita Strauss (1)
- Survivor (2)
- System of a Down (1)

== T ==
- Tantric (1)
- Corey Taylor (2)
- Kim Thayil (1)
- Theory of a Deadman (4)
- Three Days Grace (21)
- Tonic (1)
- Tool (1)
- Trapt (2)
- Tommy Tutone (1)

== U ==
- U2 (7)

== V ==
- Van Halen (13)
- Eric Vanlerberghe (1)
- Stevie Ray Vaughan (1)
- Velvet Revolver (2)
- Volbeat (13)

== W ==
- Wage War (1)
- The Wallflowers (1)
- Joe Walsh (1)
- Scooter Ward (1)
- The Warning (1)
- The Who (1)
- Steve Winwood (4)
- Zakk Wylde (1)

== Y ==
- Yes (3)
- Young Guns (1)

== Z ==
- Zac Brown Band (1)
- ZZ Top (6)
