= Chemical warfare (disambiguation) =

Chemical warfare is the use of chemical substances in warfare.

Chemical Warfare may also refer to:

- Chemical Warfare (The Alchemist album), 2009
- Chemical Warfare (Escape the Fate album), 2021
- "Chemical Warfare", a song by Dead Kennedys from the 1980 album Fresh Fruit for Rotting Vegetables
- "Chemical Warfare", a song by thrash metal band Slayer from the 1984 EP Haunting the Chapel
