= Kevin Gruft =

American musician and record producer

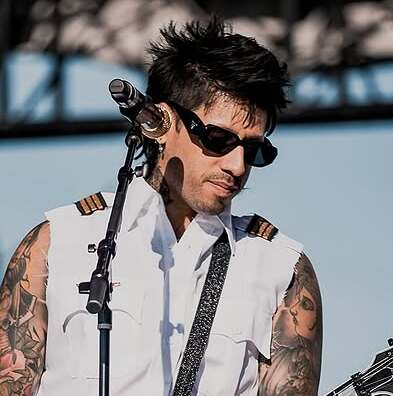
- Gruft in 2024

Background information
- Also known as: Thrasher, KThrash
- Born: May 5, 1988 (age 38); Albany, New York, U.S.
- Genres: Post-hardcore; hard rock; heavy metal; metalcore; pop-punk
- Occupations: Musician; songwriter; record producer; session player
- Instruments: Guitar; bass; keyboards; vocals
- Years active: 2005–present
- Member of: The Take Away
- Formerly of: Escape the Fate, The Dead Rabbitts, LoveHateHero
- Children: 2

Kevin Gruft (born May 5, 1988), also known as Kevin Thrasher or KThrash, is an American guitarist and music producer from Albany, New York, known for being the former lead guitarist of the rock bands Escape the Fate and LoveHateHero. He released two studio albums with LoveHateHero and three studio albums with Escape The Fate since joining the band in late 2013 until his departure in early 2021.

As a music producer and engineer, he has worked with artists such as Machine Gun Kelly, Gwen Stefani, Avril Lavigne and Blink-182.

== Biography ==
Kevin Gruft began playing guitar at the age of 8. At the age of 17, he joined the band LoveHateHero after a tour in New York, as the band was in search of a guitarist. After 5 years with the band and two studio albums, LoveHateHero disbanded in 2011. That year, he joined The Dead Rabbitts, the side-project of Escape The Fate singer, Craig Mabbitt. In late 2013, brothers Monte Money and Michael Money announced their departure from Escape The Fate to focus on their new project. Craig Mabbitt contacted Kevin to help them on the Ungrateful tour, becoming an official member soon after.

=== Escape the Fate ===
In early 2015, the band, along with Gruft, entered the studio with producer Howard Benson to record their fifth album titled "Hate Me". The album would release later that year and chart at No. 58 on the Billboard 200. Gruft played a significant role in writing the album, with the band demoing around 40 songs at his apartment in Los Angeles. As Max Green had recently left the band, Gruft and fellow guitarist TJ Bell ended up playing bass on the album. After the release of the album, the band embarked on a headlining tour with A Skylit Drive, Sworn In, Sirens and Sailors and Myka Relocate In 2016, they covered the My Chemical Romance song, "Dead!", for a Rock Sound tribute of The Black Parade.

On November 3, 2017, the band released the first single, "Empire", from their new album, I Am Human, which was set to be released on February 16, 2018, but later postponed to March 30, 2018. The band's single "Broken Heart" peaked at No. 16 on the Billboard Mainstream Rock Songs chart.

On April 16, 2021, the band released Chemical Warfare, which he co-produced with John Feldmann, which would mark the last album before his departure to focus on production work.

== Discography ==
With LoveHateHero

- White Lies (2007)
- America Underwater (2009)

With The Dead Rabbitts

- Edge of Reality (EP) (2012)

With Escape the Fate

- Hate Me (2015)
- I Am Human (2018)
- Chemical Warfare (2021)

With The Take Away

- Sad About Nothing (Single, 2020)
- Catch Me (Single, 2020)
- Angel Numbers (Single, 2025)

== Producer ==
Gruft started producing albums at a studio in Hollywood called STRZ Enterprises, producing songs with pop artists including Zendaya. He co-produced Escape The Fate's sixth album, I Am Human, as well as their seventh album, Chemical Warfare, with producer John Feldmann. He currently works with Blink-182 drummer Travis Barker as an engineer at his home studio in Calabasas, California. In this studio, he engineered Machine Gun Kelly's critically acclaimed album Tickets To My Downfall along with Barker, which would go on to peak at #1 in the Billboard 200 charts. He would engineer Blink-182 comeback song "Edging" in 2023, playing with Mark Hoppus and Barker on the latest's 'House of Horrors' pay-per-view live broadcast. Other credits include working with pop artists Gwen Stefani on her song "True Babe", and Avril Lavigne on her album Love Sux, with whom he played on a performance of "Bite Me" at The Ellen Degeneres Show.

== Production discography ==
Year	Album	Artist	Credits (Note: For albums, it indicates the credit for at least one song. "Engineer" also refers to related credits such as "Additional engineering", etc.)
2025	The Fool EP	Sarina	Composer, Producer
2025	Yokai	Dropout Kings	Producer, Engineer
2025	New Addiction	The Haunt	Composer, Producer, Engineer
2025	Sunfaded	Gunnar	Producer, Writer "Upside Down", "Dirty Blonde", "Dead of Night", "This Is Now", "2AM", "Bitter"
2025	Cycles	Iann Dior	Producer, Writer, Engineer "Six Feet"
2025	"28 and Dying"	Niki Demar	Writer, Producer
2025	"Pay Up"	justdalt.	Writer, Producer
2025	"Therapy"	Deyaz	Engineer
2025	"your name forever"	Machine Gun Kelly	Vocal Producer
2025	"Cupid's a Cowgirl"	Alexandra Kay	Writer
2024	"Santa Baby"	Kim Kardashian	Engineer
2024	"Halo"	Call Me Karizma	Producer, Writer
2024	"Need Me"	Jack Kays	Engineer
2024	"Strut"	Miss Velvet	Guitar, Mixing
2024	"Prisoner"	Yuta	Composer, Producer
2024	The Reset EP	Azra USA	Writer, Producer
2024	"Sobering"	State Champs	Writer, Co-Producer
2024	"Elusive Dreams"	Rain City Drive	Writer
2024	Lollipop Killer EP	Jeffree Star	Co-Writer, Mixing "Hi, How Are Ya?", "Beauty Killer", "Red Lipstick"
2024	"Walking on Sunshine"	Ice Nine Kills	Producer
2024	"Dream On"	Miss Velvet	Mixing
2024	"Shades of Blue"	Chad Tepper	Writer, Producer
2024	When the Music Stops	jxdn	Engineer
2024	"Can People Really Change?"	The Haunt	Producer
2024	"Edge of Tomorrow"	Iann Dior	Writer, Producer
2024	"Over You"	Landon Barker	Writer, Producer
2024	Infinity Now	Keith Wallen	Guitar, Composer, Producer
2024	"They Won't Like This"	Lauren Sanderson	Co-Writer, Producer
2024	Do Not Resuscitate EP	The Haunt	Writer, Mixing, Engineer, Producer "Little Like Hell", "I Don't Like the Quiet", "Morally Incompetent"
2024	"Wasted Youth"	Chloe Star	Composer, Producer
2024	Higher Power	Scott Stapp	Writer, Engineer, Producer
2024	Skin	Ho99o9	Mixing, Engineer
2023	"I Think That You’re Pretty"	Kid Prexy	Producer, Mixing, Mastering
2023	Blurry Eyes	Gavin Magnus	Writer, Producer "You Don't Mean It", "Nothing Left to Say", "I Need You"
2023	Valkyrie One	Set to Stun	Producer "IV: Death of a Dreamcatcher", "The Holy Mountain", "The Last Adam", "Bodysnatcher Triumphant", "V: Valkyrie One"
2023	"Again & Again"	Gunnar	Producer
2023	"Low Tide"	Iann Dior	Guitar
2023	One More Time...	Blink-182	Engineer
2023	"My Own Hell"	Jules Is Dead	Writer, Producer
2023	"You Don't Even"	Iann Dior	Engineer
2023	Dead on Arrival EP	The Haunt	Producer, Mixing, Engineer "I'm Done", "More", "I'm Not Yours"
2023	Out of the Shadows	Escape the Fate	Writer
2023	To the Wolves	Stitched Up Heart	Producer, Engineer, Writer, Guitar "To the Wolves", "Taste for Blood"
2023	Blink and You'll Miss It EP	KennyHoopla	Engineer
2023	Enigmasis	Uverworld	Composer "Don’t Think.Sing"
2023	Whitsitt Chapel	Jelly Roll	Bass, Writer, Engineer, Guitar, Keyboards, Producer, Vocals (Background) "She"
2023	"True Babe"	Gwen Stefani	Producer, Engineer
2023	Illenium	Illenium	Writer, Engineer "Eyes Wide Shut", "Lifeline", "Back To You"
2023	"Moonlit"	Chad Tepper	Producer, Engineer
2023	"Girls Don’t Come with Instructions"	VOILÀ	Writer, Producer
2023	"Alone"	Pardyalone	Engineer
2023	"In My Head"	Kid Prexy	Mixing, Producer
2023	Angela EP	Sheyna Gee	Producer
2022	Kat Leigh EP	Kat Leigh	Guitar, Drums, Engineer, Producer, Programmer, Composer "Criminal"
2022	in loving memory	blackbear	Engineer
2022	"Don’t Let Go"	The Future X	Writer, Producer
2022	It’s Not Easy Being Human	Islander	Composer, Mixing, Producer "It’s Not Easy Being Human", "Lookin’ for Love", "What Do You Gotta Lose?", "Y’all", "The Outsider"
2022	"In My Head"	24kGoldn	Guitar
2022	Mainstream Sellout	Machine Gun Kelly	Engineer "Maybe", "emo girl", "papercuts"
2022	Untitled Vol. 1	Caspr	Mixing "Hate Me", "Don't Make Sense"
2022	Love Sux	Avril Lavigne	Engineer "F.U.", "Bois Lie", "Kiss Me like the World Is Ending", "All I Wanted"
2022	Cowboy Tears	Oliver Tree	Engineer "A-Okay", "Suitcase Full of Cash", "Cigarettes"
2021	My Favorite Nightmares EP	Jack Kays	Engineer
2021	"Had to Let You Go"	Danny Goo	Producer, Writer
2021	"Raindrops"	PhaseOne	Writer
2021	Sad Looks Pretty on Me	RIVALS	Producer, Writer "Why", "Lavenders", "Change Things", "To Dom"
2021	Survivors Guilt: The Mixtape	KennyHoopla	Engineer
2021	Follow Your Nightmares	Daemon Grey	Guitar, Composer, Producer "Whiskey Devil Girl", "Stoned and Alone"
2021	"Love Race"	Machine Gun Kelly	Engineer
2021	Chemical Warfare	Escape the Fate	Engineer, Composer, Producer
2021	"On My Own"	HYDE	Writer
2021	"monsters under my bed"	Mvssie	Writer, Producer
2021	The Good Times and the Bad Ones	Why Don't We	Engineer "Slow Down", "Lotus Inn", "Look at Me"
2021	"Do Ya?"	Scarlet Spencer	Writer
2020	Weird!	Yungblud	Engineer "acting like that"
2020	Pegasus: Neon Shark vs Pegasus	Trippie Redd	Engineer, Mixing
2020	"Chasing the Fog"	Scarlet Spencer	Writer, Producer
2020	Tickets to My Downfall	Machine Gun Kelly	Engineer, Mixing, Vocals (Background)
2020	Arrested Youth & the Quarantiners EP	Arrested Youth	Producer
2020	Alpha	Whitney Peyton	Producer "Enemy"
2019	The Space Between the Shadows	Scott Stapp	Additional Production, Writer "Purpose for Pain"
2019	No Sleep Till Tokyo	Miyavi	Composer "Tears on Fire"
2019	On to Better Things	Iann Dior	Writer, Producer "Obvious"
2018	"Auld Lang Syne"	Diamante	Producer
2018	Iridescent	Whitney Peyton	Guitar, Mixing, Producer "Figured It Out"
2018	Coming In Hot	Diamante	Bass "Haunted"
2018	I Am Human	Escape the Fate	Bass, Programming, Engineer, Producer
2017	Stones	Manafest	Guitar "When the Truth Comes Out"
2017	This Emptiness	The Dead Rabbitts	Guitar, Composer, Producer, Mixing, Mastering
2015	Hate Me	Escape the Fate	Bass, Programming, Engineer
2012	Nine Lives	Deuce	Guitar
2009	"Masquerade"	Ashley Tisdale	Guitar
