= Grateful dead (disambiguation) =

The Grateful Dead was an American rock band established in 1965.

Grateful Dead may also refer to:

== Grateful Dead band related topics ==
- The Grateful Dead (album), their debut album (1967)
- Grateful Dead (album), also known as Skull and Roses (1971)
- Grateful Dead Records, a record label established by the band in 1973
- The Grateful Dead Movie, a 1977 concert film shot mostly in 1974
- The Grateful Dead Movie Soundtrack, a live album recorded at the same concerts as The Grateful Dead Movie
- Grateful Dead Archive, an archive of the band's music and other artifacts
- The Grateful Dead Channel, a Sirius XM satellite radio channel
- Grateful Dead discography
- List of Grateful Dead members
- Unfinished Grateful Dead album that was being worked on in 1995 when Jerry Garcia died
- The Best of the Grateful Dead, 2015 compilation album
- The Best of the Grateful Dead Live, 2018 compilation album
- The Story of the Grateful Dead, 2020 LP box set
- Grateful Dead Origins, 2020 graphic novel about the early days of the band
- Grateful Dead Comix, 1991–1994 comic book series

== Other uses ==
- Grateful dead (folklore), a motif from folklore

== See also ==
- Category:Grateful Dead
- Ungrateful Dead (disambiguation)
- Grateful (disambiguation)
- Dead (disambiguation)
