= Broken Heart (Escape the Fate song) =

Single by Escape the Fate

from the album I Am Human
- Released: January 16, 2018
- Recorded: 2017
- Genre: Pop-punk; post-hardcore; emo
- Length: 3:07
- Label: Eleven Seven
- Songwriters: Howard Benson: Craig Mabbitt; Kevin Gruft; John August Pregler
- Producer: Howard Benson

Escape the Fate singles chronology
"Do You Love Me?" (2017)	"Broken Heart" (2018)	"I Am Human" (2018)

"Broken Heart is a song by American rock band Escape the Fate. It was their first single off of their sixth studio album I Am Human. As of July 2018, it had peaked at No. 15 on the Billboard Mainstream Rock Songs chart.

== Background ==
The song was first released on January 16, 2018, alongside an accompanying lyric video. The single was one of four songs released in advance of the release of their sixth studio album, I Am Human on March 30, 2018. The song's music video was released a week ahead of the album's released on March 24, 2018. The video, directed by Frankie Nasso, follows the same themes as the song's lyrical themes, chronicling an emotional romantic breakup, featuring alternating between footage of the band performing and a young woman dancing to the music while showering and getting ready for her day, while avoiding calls and texts from their ex-romantic partner.

== Themes and composition ==
The song was described as being about working through a difficult emotional breakup, and the relief that comes with finally being able to move on. Journalists described its composition in a variety of ways, including that it had a clear pop punk influence, to it having the guitar tones, chord progression, lyrics, and vocal melodies commonly found in 2000s post-hardcore.

== Personnel ==
Band

- Craig Mabbitt – lead vocals
- Kevin Gruft – lead guitar,
- TJ Bell – rhythm guitar, bass
- Robert Ortiz – drums

Production

- Howard Benson – producer

== Charts ==
Chart (2018)	Peak position
US Mainstream Rock (Billboard)	15
