= Ungrateful =

Ungratefulness is the lack of gratitude.

Ungrateful may also refer to:

- Ungrateful (album), a 2013 album by Escape the Fate, or its title track
- "Ungrateful" (song), by Megan Thee Stallion featuring Key Glock, 2022
- "Ungrateful", a song by Central Cee from the mixtape 23, 2022

== See also ==
- "Ungreatful", a song by Messy Marv and Berner from the album Blow, 2009
- The Ingrateful (1727), a novel by Arabella Plantin
- Grateful (disambiguation)
