= Dead Rabbitts =

American metalcore supergroup

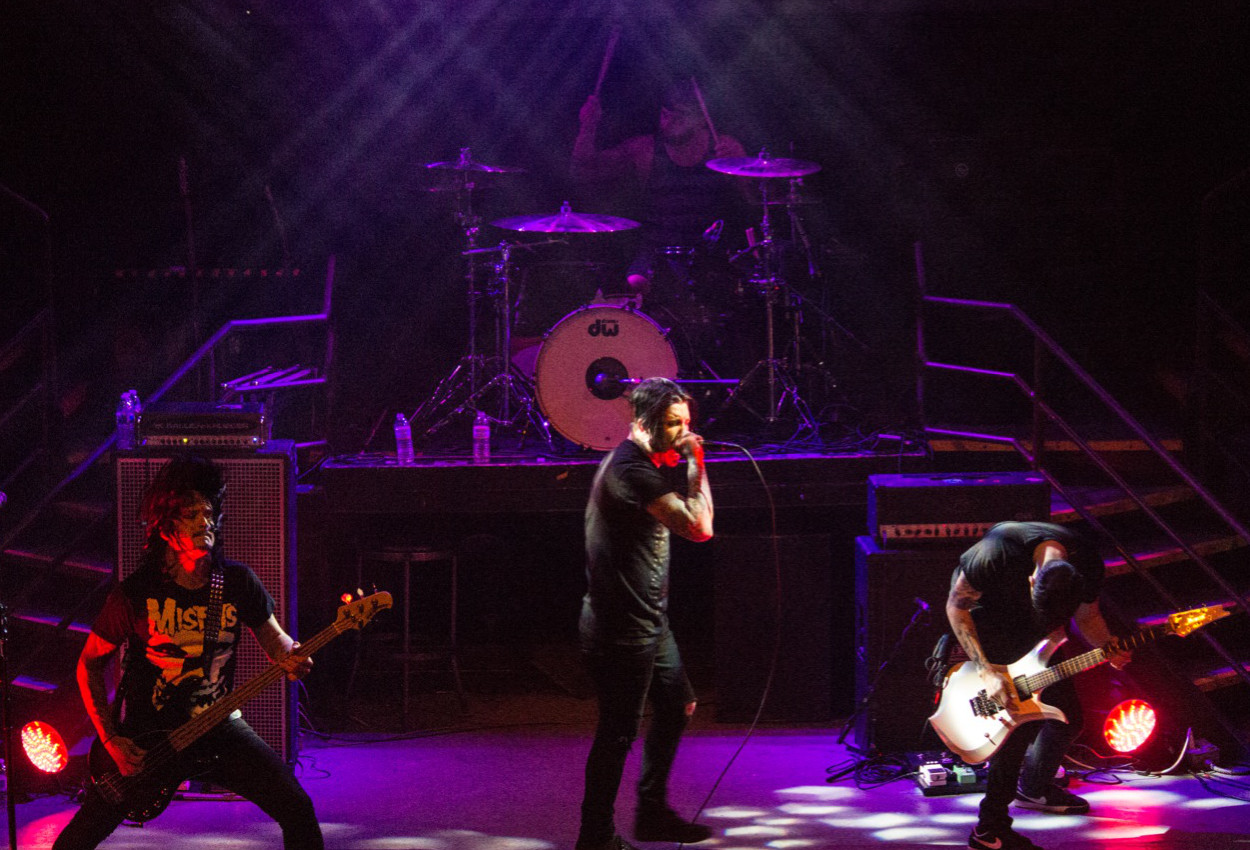
- Dead Rabbitts performing live in 2014. From left to right: TJ Bell, Rob Pierce (above), Craig Mabbitt (below) and Alex Torres.

Background information
- Origin: Phoenix, Arizona, U.S.
- Genres: Metalcore; post-hardcore
- Years active: 2011–present
- Labels: Judge & Jury; Tragic Hero
- Members: Craig Mabbitt; Erik "Shredz" Jensen; Blake Bailey; Colton Westerman
- Past members: Kevin "Thrasher" Gruft; Brian O'Dawd; Tony Aguilera; August Cryns; Chris Julian; Alex Torres; Rob Pierce; Bobby Whitaker; TJ Bell
- Website: https://deadrabbitts.com/

Dead Rabbitts are an American metalcore supergroup from Phoenix, Arizona. The band is a side project of Escape the Fate's lead vocalist, Craig Mabbitt. Dead Rabbitt's debut EP, Edge of Reality, was released in 2012. The band's second EP, Break the Static, was released in 2019. The band's debut album, Shapeshifter, was released in 2014. The album debuted at No. 127 on the Billboard 200. The band's second studio album, This Emptiness, was released in 2017. The band's third studio album, Rumination, was released in 2022. The band's fourth studio album, Redefined, was released in 2025.

== History ==
=== Formation and Edge of Reality (2011–2013) ===
In late 2011, lead vocalist Craig Mabbitt announced an upcoming side-project, along with an upcoming album for Escape the Fate. Mabbitt revealed that a single from the side-project would be released in February 2012, and the album would be produced by Caleb Shomo of Beartooth. Members of the side project would include Kevin "Thrasher" Gruft of LoveHateHero who later went on to join Escape the Fate, TJ Bell of Escape the Fate and formerly of Motionless in White, Alex Torres formerly of Eyes Set to Kill, Greeley Estates, and Alesana. He hinted that the album will be a reminiscent of the music he made while in his previous bands Blessthefall and The Word Alive.

Mabbitt announced a tentative April 9 release date for the album, stating "what better day to release your album than on your birthday?", but this was later delayed. In January, he created a Facebook page and posted that he would stream a song from the side-project's upcoming EP if the page got to 50,000 "likes". When the page got to around 49,500 likes, he revealed the title and lyrics for the upcoming song, titled "Edge of Reality". The song "Edge of Reality" was released the moment the page reached 50,000 likes.

On March 30, he announced the name of the upcoming EP, Edge of Reality, under the band name "Dead Rabbitts". On April 9, he released another song from the EP titled "World of Disaster".

In mid-2012, Dead Rabbitts announced that they would be teaming with To Write Love on Her Arms and PledgeMusic with the release of the EP. Through PledgeMusic, fans were able to pre-order the EP along with extra items such as signed CDs, posters, concert tickets, and more. People who pre-ordered the album through the website, or "pledged", would also be able to download the album earlier than others. When the pre-orders hit the target goal, 5 percent of the money raised would be donated to To Write Love On Her Arms. Pledgers would also receive updates and exclusive videos. Mabbitt released certain songs from the EP when the target percentage of donations reached certain points, such as 55 or 75 percent. The target was reached on October 4, 2012, and the album was released on October 19. The band set off on the "Pizza Party Tour" with bands Get Scared and Rob the Cartel and As Thick As Thieves The tour started in Tucson, Arizona on September 12, 2012, and ended September 29 in Sacramento, California.

=== Recent works, Line-up changes (2014–present) ===
In November 2013, Dead Rabbitts signed with Tragic Hero Records and announced that they will be releasing an album sometime in 2014. In December, they began recording songs with Andrew Wade. On May 16, 2014, the band released their first single "My Only Regret" from their debut album Shapeshifter, which was released on July 1, 2014. This is the first and last album with the band's guitarist Alex Torres. On November 7, the band released a music video from their song "Deer in the Headlights".

On January 24, 2017, the band released their first single "Dead Again" from their second studio album This Emptiness which will be released on April 14, 2017. Two days later after the album's release, guitarist Bobby Whitaker parted ways with the band. On June 13, 2017, the band released a remix version of their single "Dead Again" featuring rapper Whitney Peyton.

In September 2019, the band posted in the studio with Cameron Mizell, and also announced TJ Bell was no longer part of the band. Mabbitt said "TJ Bell is no longer a member of Dead Rabbitts but their door is always open to him." On October 25, 2019, the band released a single titled "Dead by Daylight" on the same day the band also announced lineup changes, Erik Jensen as guitarist and Blake Bailey as drummer. On November 22, 2019, the band released the single "Gutter" with Whitney Peyton and Courtney LaPlante as guest vocals. On December 6, 2019, their second EP Break the Static was released. This is the band's first release without an official bassist since TJ Bell's departure in early 2019.

In September 2020, former short-time rhythm guitarist August Cryns passed away. In mid-2020 to late 2021, the band released five songs including "Echo" and most recently "Acceptance" from their third album to be released in 2022.

On January 23, 2022, the band announced their third album Rumination will be released on April 1, 2022.

At their album release party, Colton Westerman joined on stage, playing bass. Soon after, he was announced as the band's new bassist.

On June 21, 2024, the band released "Mistake" featuring Lauren Babic, the first single from the band's forthcoming Redefined EP, which will be released this fall via Judge & Jury Records, the record label and production company founded by producers Howard Benson and Neil Sanderson. The EP was cut by engineer Mike Plotnikoff at West Valley Recording Studios in Woodland Hills, California.

On March 14, 2025, the band released their fourth studio album, Redefined.

== Band members ==
Current

- Craig Mabbitt – lead vocals (2011–present)
- Erik "Shredz" Jensen – guitar, co-lead vocals (2017–present), bass (2019–2022)
- Blake Bailey – drums, percussion (2017–present)
- Colton Westerman - bass (2022–present)

Former

- Kevin "Thrasher" Gruft – guitar, backing vocals (2011–2012)
- Brian O'Dawd – drums, percussion (2011–2012)
- TJ Bell – bass, co-lead vocals (2011–2019, 2021–2022)
- Tony Aguilera – drums, percussion (2012–2013)
- August Cryns – guitar, backing vocals (2012–2014; died 2020)
- Alex Torres – guitar, backing vocals (2012–2015)
- Chris Julian – drums, percussion (2013–2014)
- Rob Pierce – drums, percussion (2014–2017)
- Bobby Whitaker – guitar, backing vocals (2016–2017)
- Carlos Ruiz – bass (2019–2021; 2021)
- Skylar Schular - bass (2021)

Timeline

== Discography ==
=== Studio albums ===
- Shapeshifter (2014)
- This Emptiness (2017)
- Rumination (2022)
- Redefined (2025)

=== EPs ===
- Edge of Reality (2012)
- Break the Static (2019)

=== Music videos ===
- "Edge of Reality" (2012)
- "Deer in the Headlights" (2014)
- "Burn It Down" (2017)
- "This Emptiness" (2017)
- "Dead by Daylight" (2020)
- "Echo" (2020)
- "Rumination" (2021)
- "Cobra Kai" (2021)
- "Options" (2022)
- "Raisehell.exe" (2022)
- "Mistake" (2024)
- "Oxygen" (2024)
- "T/R/A/P/P/E/D" (2025)
- "Hellscape" (2025)
