= The Haunt =

American rock band

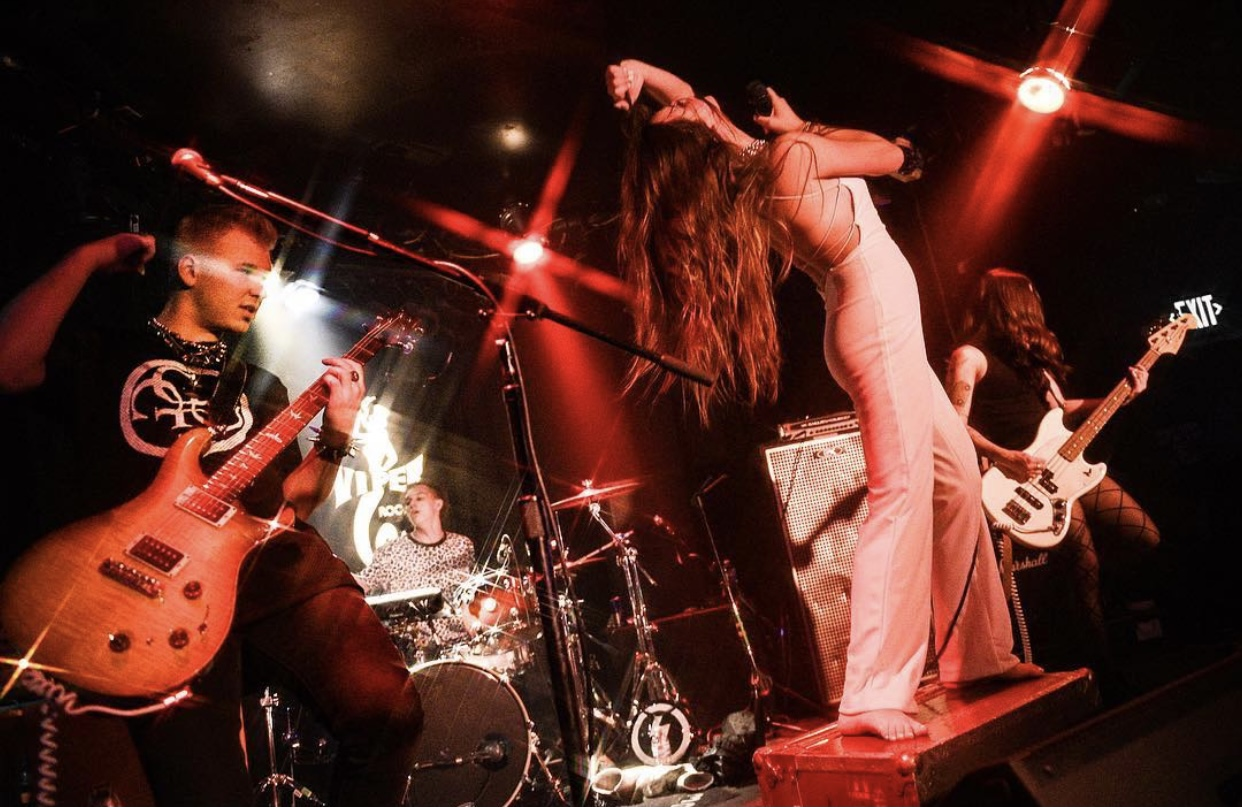
- The Haunt performing at The Viper Room in Los Angeles, California in 2019

Background information
- Origin: Fort Lauderdale, Florida, U.S.
- Genres: Alternative rock; hard rock; pop rock
- Years active: 2015–present
- Members: Anastasia Grace Haunt; Maxamillion Haunt
- Past members: Sage Duvall; Steph Pino; Rob Kingsley; Felipe Silva; Nick Lewert; Nat Smallish
- Website: thehauntband.com

The Haunt is an American rock band formed in Fort Lauderdale, Florida in 2015. The group consists of siblings Anastasia Grace Haunt (vocals) and Maxamillion Haunt (vocals, guitar). They gained recognition with the release of their self-titled debut EP (2018) and tours with Palaye Royale.

== History ==
Anastasia and Maxamillion Haunt began performing locally, writing and releasing music around the time Anastasia was 12 years old. Singer and guitarist Maxamillion Haunt co-produced their debut EP alongside producer and musician Josh Diaz. The band begun releasing the EP with the first single "All Went Black" which talked personally about Anastasia's history with bullying and how she found strength through music. The song was critically acclaimed, allowing the band to release three more singles, leading up to the debut of the record. After the release, The Haunt opened for fashion-rock band Palaye Royale, providing support on concerts in the United States, Canada, and Europe.

After returning from tour, The Haunt recorded two singles to be released independent of a studio album; "Why Are You So Cold?" and "Cigarettes & Feelings" The band then proceeded to record a new EP, the Social Intercourse EP with From First to Last guitarist/producer, Matt Good. All the songs on the EP, except "Permanent", were released as singles. One of the singles, "Twisted Dream", saw its video directed by Darren Stein, known for his work on Jawbreaker, and G.B.F. In 2021 The Haunt supported The Hu on two tours of North America.

In 2023, The Haunt released their new EP, Dead on Arrival, produced by Kevin Gruft. York Calling described the release as a charismatic and emotional collection that balanced "rock undertones" with mainstream accessibility.

The following year, the duo released their fourth EP, Do Not Resuscitate. Jo Cosgrove of Distorted Sound praised the record's high production standards and "soulful and seething lyrics," noting the harmony between the siblings as a standout element in contemporary music.

== Discography ==
=== The Haunt EP ===
(2018)

No.	Title	Length
1.	"Brat"	3:29
2.	"Dirty"	2:52
3.	"Bullet"	4:32
4.	"Get Away"	3:36
5.	"Streets & Lies"	2:39
6.	"All Went Black"	3:16

=== Social Intercourse - EP ===
(2021)

No.	Title	Length
1.	"Brag About"	3:15
2.	"Wish You Stayed"	3:12
3.	"Constant"	3:32
4.	"Love You Better"	3:56
5.	"Permanent"	3:24
6.	"Twisted Dream"	3:04

=== Dead On Arrival - EP ===
(2023)

No.	Title	Length
1.	"Overdose"	2:51
2.	"Shake"	3:35
3.	"This Won't Go Over Well"	3:24
4.	"I'm Done"	3:23
5.	"More"	3:11
6.	"OK"	3:26

=== Do Not Resuscitate - EP ===
(2024)

No.	Title	Length
1.	"FML"	3:40
2.	"Little Like Hell"	3:07
3.	"I Don't Like The Quiet"	3:00
4.	"Damage"	2:38
5.	"Morally Incompetent"	2:55
6.	"On My Grave"	3:12

=== New Addiction ===
(2025)

No.	Title	Length
1.	"New Addiction"	3:10
2.	"Bad Omen"	2:31
3.	"Going Under"	2:20
4.	"Masochistic Lovers" (feat. Craig Mabbitt)	2:07
5.	"Blood Red Heart"	2:25
6.	"Claws"	2:31
7.	"Teeth"	2:30
8.	"Dead 2 Me"	2:28
9.	"Worst In Me"	2:22
10.	"Own Me"	3:08

=== Ghost ===
(2026)

No.	Title	Length
1.	"Ghost"	2:41
2.	"Favorite Way To Die"	2:43
3.	"Alone On Your Planet"	2:40
4.	"Worse Taste In Men"	2:34
5.	"Seasonal Depression"	2:32
6.	"Until I Die"	2:39
7.	"Cocaine"	2:42
8.	"Misery Loves Company (I Hate You)"	3:14
9.	"Psychotic Love"	2:15
10.	"Rain Clouds"	2:37
11.	"Hate Me"	2:52
12.	"Six Feet Underneath"	3:18
13.	"Leaving, I'm Done"	2:48

=== Albums ===
- New Addiction (2025)
- Ghost (2026)

=== Extended plays ===
- The Haunt EP (2018)
- Social Intercourse (2021)
- Dead On Arrival (2023)
- Do Not Resuscitate (2024)

=== Singles ===
- "All Went Black" (2017)
- '"Dirty" (2017)
- "Bullet" (2018)
- "Get Away" (2018)
- "Why Are You So Cold?" (2019)
- "Cigarettes & Feelings" (2019)
- "Brag About" (2020)
- "Constant" (2020)
- "Twisted Dream" (2020)
- "Wish You Stayed" (2021)
- "Love You Better" (2021)
- "Hollywood" (2021)
- "Make Me King" (2021)
- "I'm Not Yours" (2022)
- "You Know I'm No Good" (2022)
- "Shake" (2023)
- "This Won't Go Over Well" (2023)
- "FML" (2023)
- "Gaslight" (2024)
- "Can People Really Change?" (2024)
- "New Addiction" (2024)
- "Dead 2 Me" (2025)
- "What If...?" (2025)
- "Nervous Wreck" (2025)
- "Ghost" (2026)
- "Favourite Way To Die" (2026)
- "Worst Taste In Men" (2026)
- "Seasonal Depression" (2026)
- "Until I Die" (2026)

=== Charted singles ===
Year	Song	Peak chart positions	Album
Year	Song	US Main.	Album
2024	"Masochistic Lovers" (feat. Craig Mabbitt)	24	New Addiction
2024	"Bad Omen"	25	New Addiction
2026	"Alone On Your Planet"	38	Ghost

=== Music videos ===
List of music videos, showing year released, album and director(s)
Title	Year	Album	Director(s)
"All Went Black"	2017	The Haunt	Chris Hill
"Dirty"	2017	The Haunt	Chris Hill
"Bullet"	2018	The Haunt	Chris Hill
"Why Are You So Cold?"	2019	Non-album singles	Chris Hill
"Cigarettes and Feelings"	2019	Non-album singles	Unknown
"Brag About"	2020	Social Intercourse	Chris Hill
"Constant"	2020	Social Intercourse	Chris Hill
"Twisted Dreams"	2020	Social Intercourse	Darren Stein
"Wish You Stayed"	2021	Social Intercourse	Chris Hill
"Love You Better"	2021	Social Intercourse	Chris Hill
"Permanent"	2021	Social Intercourse	Jacqueline Kulla
"Hollywood"	2021	Plan B	Chris Hill
"Make Me King"	2021	Non-album singles	Nick Lewert
"I'm Not Yours"	2022	Non-album singles	Chris Hill and Nick Lewert
"You Know I'm No Good" (with DYLYN)	2022	Non-album singles	Chris Hill
"Shake"	2023	Dead On Arrival	Chris Hill
"This Won't Go Over Well"	2023	Dead On Arrival	Nick Lewert
"I'm Done"	2023	Dead On Arrival	Nick Lewert
"More"	2023	Dead On Arrival	Nick Lewert
"OK"	2023	Dead On Arrival	Chris Hill
"Overdose"	2023	Dead On Arrival	Nick Lewert
"FML"	2023	Do Not Resuscitate	Nick Lewert
"Little Like Hell"	2023	Do Not Resuscitate	Unknown
"I Don't Like the Quiet"	2024	Do Not Resuscitate	Unknown
"Damage"	2024	Do Not Resuscitate	Unknown
"Morally Incompetent"	2024	Do Not Resuscitate	Unknown
"New Addiction"	2024	New Addiction	Unknown
"Masochistic Lovers" (feat. Craig Mabbitt)	2024	New Addiction	Unknown
"Bad Omen"	2024	New Addiction	Unknown
"Going Under"	2024	New Addiction	Unknown
"Blood Red Heart"	2024	New Addiction	Unknown
"Claws"	2025	New Addiction	Unknown
"Teeth"	2025	New Addiction	Unknown
"Dead 2 Me"	2025	New Addiction	Unknown
"Own Me" (feat. Mod Sun)	2025	New Addiction	Unknown
"Worst In Me"	2025	New Addiction	Unknown
"Nervous Wreck"	2025	Non-album single	Unknown
"Ghost"	2026	Ghost	Unknown
"Favorite Way To Die"	2026	Ghost	Unknown
"Alone On Your Planet"	2026	Ghost	Unknown
"Worst Taste In Men"	2026	Ghost	Unknown
"Seasonal Depression"	2026	Ghost	Unknown
"Until I Die"	2026	Ghost	Unknown
"Cocaine"	2026	Ghost	Unknown
