= Gratitude (disambiguation) =

Gratitude is an emotion.

Gratitude or Gratitud may also refer to:

== Music ==
- Gratitude (band), an early 2000s American rock band

=== Albums ===
- Gratitud, by Fonseca, or the title song, 2008
- Gratitude (Benjamin Francis Leftwich album) or the title song, 2019
- Gratitude (Chris Potter album) or the title song, 2001
- Gratitude (Dayna Stephens album), 2017
- Gratitude (Earth, Wind & Fire album) or the title song, 1975
- Gratitude (Gratitude album), 2005
- Gratitude (Lisa album), 2004
- Gratitude (Mary J. Blige album), 2024
- Gratitude (P-Money album) or the title song, 2013
- Gen Hoshino Singles Box: Gratitude, 2020

=== Songs ===
- "Gratitude" (Beastie Boys song), 1992
- "Gratitude" (Brandon Lake song), 2020
- "Gratitude", by Big Red Machine from their self-titled album, 2018
- "Gratitude", by Björk from Drawing Restraint 9, 2005
- "GrAttitude", by Bruno Sutter from Bruno Sutter, 2015
- "Gratitude", by Danny Elfman and Oingo Boingo from So-Lo, 1984
- "Gratitude", by I Am the Avalanche from Avalanche United, 2011
- "Gratitude", by Paul McCartney from Memory Almost Full, 2007
- "Gratitude", by XO-IQ, featured in the television series Make It Pop, 2015

== Other uses ==
- Gratitude (play), an 1881 play by W.A. Burnage
- Gratitude Fund, an American non-profit organization
- Gratitude Magwanishe, South African politician
- Gratitude, a 2015 book by Oliver Sacks

== See also ==
- Grateful (disambiguation)
