= Shapeshifter (Dead Rabbitts album) =

2014 studio album by Dead Rabbitts

Studio album by The Dead Rabbitts
- Released: July 1, 2014
- Genre: Metalcore, post-hardcore
- Length: 37:29
- Label: Tragic Hero
- Producer: Andrew Wade

The Dead Rabbitts chronology
Edge of Reality (2012)	Shapeshifter (2014)	This Emptiness (2017)

Singles from Shapeshifter
- 1. "My Only Regret" Released: May 16, 2014; 2. "Shapeshifter" Released: June 3, 2014; 3. "Bats In the Belfry" Released: June 21, 2014

Shapeshifter is the debut album by American metalcore band The Dead Rabbitts. It was released on July 1, 2014.

== Background ==
This album was released a year after the band's debut EP Edge of Reality was released. Before the announcement, the band toured with Metalcore band Eyes Set to Kill in the Arizona, US. In November 2013, the band signed with Tragic Hero Records and announced that they will be releasing an album sometime in 2014. and In December 2013. they began recording songs with Andrew Wade.

The album was announced by the band a month prior to its release on May 16 and stated that the album would be released on July 1, 2014, through Tragic Hero Records.

== Promotion ==
"My Only Regret" was released as the debut single off the album on May 16, 2014, along with its lyric video. The second single "Shapeshifter" was released on June 3, 2014. The third single "Bats In the Belfry" was released on June 21, 2014. and the band premiered a music video for "Deer In the Headlights" on November 7, 2014.

=== Tour ===
In support of the album, The band embarked on ShapeshifTour, which took place from June 20 to July 26, 2014. Support for the tour included The Relapse Symphony, Myka Relocate, and Nightmares. for the 28-date summer trek.

== Critical reception ==
Professional ratings
Review scores
Source	Rating
Revolver	4/5 stars
AllMusic	3/5 stars

Shapeshifter was met with positive reception by critics. In a four-star review for Revolver, David McKenna averring, "Fans of post-hardcore will definitely want to check this album out."

== Track listing ==
All tracks are written by The Dead Rabbitts.

No.	Title	Writer(s)	Length
1.	"My Only Regret"	Craig Mabbitt, August Cryns	3:01
2.	"Nothin' But a Reject"	Mabbitt, Cryns	3:57
3.	"Make Me Believe It" (featuring Caleb Shomo)	Mabbitt, Caleb Shomo	3:39
4.	"Shapeshifter"	Mabbitt, Alex Torres	4:02
5.	"Deer in the Headlights"	Mabbitt, Torres	3:55
6.	"Bats in the Belfry"	Mabbitt, Torres	3:32
7.	"Ghosts in My Bedroom"	Mabbitt, Cryns, TJ Bell	3:30
8.	"The Air I Breathe Is You"	Mabbitt, Shomo	3:38
9.	"Keep Tellin' Yourself You Were Right"	Mabbitt, Torres	3:08
10.	"Edge of Reality"	Mabbitt, Shomo	3:01
11.	"Black Cloud"	Mabbitt, Cryns	3:26
Total length:			37:29

== Personnel ==
Album personnel as listed on Allmusic

=== The Dead Rabbitts ===
- Craig Mabbitt – lead vocals
- TJ Bell – bass, backing clean and unclean vocals
- Alex Torres – lead guitar, backing clean vocals
- Chris Julian – drums

=== Additional personnel ===
- Rob Pierce – drums on "Deer in the Headlights" music video
- Caleb Shomo – songwriter, guest vocals on "Make Me Believe It"
- Augustus Cryns – songwriter, guitar, bass, background vocals
- Andrew Wade – producer, mixing, mastering

== Charts ==
Chart (2014)	Peak; position
U.S. Billboard 200	127
U.S. Top Hard Rock Albums	8
U.S. Top Independent Albums	17
U.S. Top Rock Albums	23
U.S. Top Heatseekers	1
U.S. Top New Artist	1
