= Issues (Escape the Fate song) =

Single by Escape the Fate

from the album Escape the Fate
- Released: September 19, 2010
- Recorded: 2010
- Genre: Post-hardcore, hard rock
- Length: 2:42
- Label: Interscope
- Songwriters: Robert Ortiz: Craig Mabbitt; Monte Money; Michael Money; Max Green
- Producer: Don Gilmore

Escape the Fate singles chronology
"Massacre" (2010)	"Issues" (2010)	"Gorgeous Nightmare" (2011)

"Issues" is a single by Escape the Fate off of their 2010 self-titled album. It was released on September 14, 2010. This song debuted at No. 48 on America's Music Charts for Active Rock, and peaked at No. 27 on the Billboard Hot Mainstream Rock Tracks chart, and debut No. 32 on both the Billboard Alternative Songs chart, and No. 39 on the Billboard Rock Songs chart.

== Music video ==
The music video was released on September 28, 2010 and was directed by P.R. Brown. It presents a narrative that is told out of chronology. It features the band members playing in a Churchlike building. A mob of people break into the church and attack the band members, capturing them. Max is seen being tied to a wooden stake, where he is subsequently burned. Monte is tied up in a similar action, however his rope is pulled as he falls into a lake. Robert is forced to lean his head against a stump, while a man with an axe is implied to have chopped his head off. Meanwhile, Craig is tied to a noose, and is seen barely keeping himself up by lifting his body up by pushing on a stick with his foot. When the video ends, the stick cracks and breaks.

== Track listing ==
iTunes Single Edition
No.	Title	Length
1.	"Issues"	2:42

Issues- Remixes EP

No.	Title		Length
1.	"Issues (Jakwob Remix)"		3:00
2.	"Issues (Does It Offend You, Yeah? Remix)"		3:47
3.	"Issues (Wolves At The Gate Remix)"		3:44
4.	"Issues (LA Riots Remix)"		5:43
		Total Length	16:14

European Bonus Track

No.	Title		Length
5.	"Issues (Neus Remix)"		4:13
		Total Length	20:27

== Personnel ==
- Craig Mabbitt - lead vocals
- Monte Money - guitars, backing vocals
- Max Green - bass, backing vocals
- Robert Ortiz - drums, percussion

== Chart performance ==
Chart (2010)	Peak position
U.S. Billboard Alternative Songs	29
U.S. Billboard Hot Mainstream Rock Tracks	23
U.S. Billboard Rock Songs	33
