= Grateful =

Grateful may refer to:

- Gratitude, an emotion

== Albums ==
- Grateful (Carpark North album), 2008
- Grateful (Coko album) or the title song, 2006
- Grateful (DJ Khaled album), 2017
- Grateful (The Red Clay Strays album), 2026

== Songs ==
- "Grateful" (Edyta Górniak song), 2016
- "Grateful" (Rita Ora song), 2014
- "Grateful", by John Bucchino, 1998
- "Grateful", by Neffex, 2018
- "Grateful", by Plan B from Heaven Before All Hell Breaks Loose, 2018

== See also ==
- Greatful, an album by Classified, 2016
- Ungrateful (disambiguation)
- Gratitude (disambiguation)
