= The Last Goodbye (Escape the Fate album) =

Studio album by Escape the Fate
- Released: October 2, 2026
- Length: 47:48
- Label: Big Noise
- Producer: Matt Good

Escape the Fate chronology
Out of the Shadows (2023)	The Last Goodbye (2026)

Singles from The Last Goodbye
- 1. "Déjà Vu" Released: March 27, 2026; 2. "Idle Potential" Released: May 29, 2026; 3. "Paranoia" Released: August 28, 2026

The Last Goodbye is the ninth studio album by American rock band Escape the Fate. It was released on October 2, 2026, through Big Noise Music and was produced by Matt Good.

== Track listing ==
All lyrics are written by Craig Mabbitt; all music is composed by Mabbitt, Matti Hoffman, Erik Jensen, Robert Ortiz, and Matt Good.

The Last Goodbye track listing
No.	Title	Length
1.	"Last Goodbye"	3:10
2.	"Comatose"	3:50
3.	"Coffin Kingdom"	3:19
4.	"Paranoia"	4:06
5.	"Idle Potential"	4:04
6.	"Déjà Vu"	3:36
7.	"Devil in Wait"	3:18
8.	"Money Power Fame"	3:41
9.	"Hurt"	3:54
10.	"Medicine"	3:36
11.	"Other Side"	3:54
12.	"Bedroom Wall"	3:47
13.	"Remedy of Numbness"	3:33
Total length:		47:48

== Personnel ==
Credits are adapted from Tidal.

=== Escape the Fate ===
- Craig Mabbitt – lead vocals
- Matti Hoffman – lead guitar
- Erik Jensen – rhythm guitar, bass guitar, backing vocals
- Robert Ortiz – drums

=== Technical ===
- Matt Good – production, mixing, engineering
- Ted Jensen – mastering
