= All Good Things (band) =

American Rock band

- Origin: Los Angeles, California
- Genres: Alternative rock; pop rock; electronic rock; arena rock; hard rock
- Years active: 2013–Present
- Label: Better Noise Records
- Members: Dan Murphy; Andrew Bojanic; Liz Hooper; Miles Franco; Tim Spier
- Website: allgoodthings.la

All Good Things is an American alternative rock band formed in Los Angeles in 2013. The group consists of Dan Murphy (vocals), Andrew Bojanic (guitars, bass, vocals, keyboards, producer), Liz Hooper (bass, vocals, keyboards, producer), Miles Franco (guitars, bass, vocals), and Tim Spier (drums, vocals). They were signed to Better Noise Records in 2019 after their song "For The Glory" and their album Machines appeared in multiple television and film advertisements, such as for the NHL, WWE, PlayStation, and their music videos were streamed and viewed more than 100 million times.

The band signed with the Better Noise Records label in 2019 and released the single "Kingdom" from their forthcoming album.

== Band Members ==
=== Present ===
- Dan Murphy - vocals, guitar
- Andrew Bojanic - guitar, vocals
- Liz Hooper - bass, keyboard, vocals
- Miles Franco - guitar, bass, vocals
- Tim Spier - drums, vocals

=== Past ===
- Joe Pringle - vocals
- Phil X - vocals, guitar
- Randy Cooke - drums

== Discography ==
=== Albums ===
Title	Details
Battle Rock 2	Released: May 19, 2014; Label: Extreme Music; Formats: digital stream/download
All Good Songs	Released: November 17, 2016; Label: Superpop.Co; Formats: digital stream/download
Machines	Originally Released: 2017, Re-Released: August 16, 2019; Label: Superpop.Co | Better Noise Records; Formats: digital stream/download
Live @ The Whisky a Go Go	Released: April 27, 2018; Label: Superpop.Co; Formats: digital stream/download
Acoustic, Vol. 1	Released: September 12, 2019; Label: Superpop.Co; Formats: digital stream/download
A Hope In Hell	Released: August 21, 2021; Label: Better Noise Music; Formats: digital stream/download
Ascend	Released: October 10, 2025; Formats: digital stream/download

=== Singles ===
List of singles as lead artist, showing year released and album name
Title	Year	Peak chart positions	Album
Title	Year	US Main.	Album
"Kingdom"	2020	—	A Hope In Hell
"For the Glory" (featuring Johnny 3 Tears and Charlie Scene)	2021	1	A Hope In Hell
"The Comeback" (featuring Craig Mabbitt)	2021	17	A Hope In Hell
"Hold On" (solo or featuring Lacey Sturm)	2022	—	A Hope In Hell

=== Music videos ===
Year	Video	Director
2017	"Machines"	Jeremy Danger and Travis Shinn
2018	"Break Through This Wall"	—N/a
2018	"The Middle (Zedd, Maren Morris, Grey - Epic Rock Cover)"	—N/a
2020	"Kingdom"	—N/a
2021	"For the Glory"	—N/a
2021	"The Comeback"	Robyn August
