= Hate Me (album) =

Studio album by Escape the Fate
- Released: October 30, 2015
- Genres: Post-hardcore; hard rock; metalcore
- Length: 38:15
- Label: Eleven Seven
- Producer: Howard Benson

Escape the Fate chronology
Ungrateful (2013)	Hate Me (2015)	I Am Human (2018)

Singles from Hate Me
- 1. "Just a Memory" Released: August 18, 2015; 2. "Remember Every Scar" Released: September 25, 2015; 3. "Les Enfants Terribles (The Terrible Children)" Released: October 16, 2015; 4. "Alive" Released: October 20, 2015; 5. "Breaking Me Down" Released: November 7, 2016

Hate Me is the fifth studio album by American rock band Escape the Fate. The album was produced by Howard Benson. The album features a new lineup; with Kevin "Thrasher" Gruft on lead guitar, bass, programming and TJ Bell on rhythm guitar and bass. It is the first album without Michael and Monte Money. The album was released on October 30, 2015, through Eleven Seven Music.

== Background ==
After the return of bassist Max Green in 2013 and his second departure in 2014 the band went through a string of touring bassist and left the band in a state of uncertainty. Kevin "Thrasher" Gruft and TJ Bell ended up playing bass on the album. The band also lost guitarists Monte and Michael Money in late 2013. The band entered the studio on May 10, 2015, to start recording the album with Howard Benson.

== Singles and promotion ==
In early August 2015 the band changed all of their social media photos to read "8.18.15" which was speculated to be a single release or an album announcement.

On August 18, the band released the single "Just a Memory" for free online and officially announced the album along with a worldwide tour.

== Track listing ==
No.	Title	Writer(s)	Length
1.	"Just a Memory"	Craig Mabbitt, Robert Ortiz, Howard Benson, Kevin Gruft	4:28
2.	"Live for Today"	Kevin Gruft	4:41
3.	"Remember Every Scar"	Gruft, Bell, Mabbitt, Ortiz, Johnny Andrews, Benson	4:03
4.	"Breaking Me Down"	Bell, Mabbitt, Ortiz, Jacoby Shaddix, Tobin Esperance, Anthony Esperance, Kevin Churko, Benson, Kevin Gruft	3:31
5.	"Alive"	Gruft, Bell, Mabbitt, Ortiz, Michael Carey, Benson	3:09
6.	"Get Up, Get Out"	Gruft, Bell, Mabbitt, Ortiz, Joe Cotela, Drew Fulk, Benson	3:58
7.	"Hate Me"	Gruft, Bell, Mabbitt, Ortiz, Esjay Jones, Benson	4:09
8.	"Les Enfants Terribles" (The Terrible Children)	Bell	3:32
9.	"I Won't Break"	Gruft, Bell, Mabbitt, Ortiz, Brandon Saller, Fulk, Benson	3:12
10.	"Let Me Be"	Gruft, Bell, Mabbitt, Ortiz, Jason Phelps, Benson	3:32
Total length:			38:15

Deluxe version
No.	Title	Writer(s)	Length
11.	"Redline"	Gruft, Bell, Mabbitt, Ortiz, Fulk, Benson	3:28
12.	"End of the World"	Ortiz, Carey, David Walsh, Benson	3:36
13.	"Just a Memory" (Mozaix remix)		3:55
14.	"Live for Today" (Mozaix remix)		3:57
Total length:			52:21

== Personnel ==
Escape the Fate

- Craig Mabbitt – lead vocals
- Kevin Gruft – guitar, bass, additional programming, engineer
- TJ Bell – guitar, bass, backing vocals
- Robert Ortiz – drums

Artwork and design

- Spiral Grey – illustrations
- Trevor Niemann – design

Production

- Howard Benson – producer, mixing, keyboards
- Mike Plotnikoff – producer, mixing, engineer
- Lenny Skolnik – producer, keyboards, programming
- Don Bakeman – assistant engineer
- Chris Bousquet – assistant engineer
- Wendell Teague – assistant engineer
- Hatsukazu "Hatch" Inagaki – engineer
- Marc VanGool – guitar technician
- Jonny Litten – drum programming, keyboards, programming
- Paul DeCarli – digital editing

== Charts ==
Chart (2015)	Peak position
Australian Albums (ARIA)	32
Canadian Albums (Billboard)	84
US Billboard 200	58
US Top Hard Rock Albums (Billboard)	2
US Independent Albums (Billboard)	5
