= Out of the Shadows (Escape the Fate album) =

Studio album by Escape the Fate
- Released: September 1, 2023
- Recorded: 2022
- Studios: Foxy, Woodland Hills, California
- Genres: Alternative metal; post-hardcore; alternative rock
- Length: 38:36
- Label: Big Noise
- Producer: John Feldmann

Escape the Fate chronology
Chemical Warfare (2021)	Out of the Shadows (2023)	The Last Goodbye (2026)

Singles from Out of the Shadows
- 1. "H8 My Self" Released: January 27, 2023; 2. "Low" Released: March 31, 2023; 3. "Cheers to Goodbye" Released: June 30, 2023; 4. "Dearly Departed" Released: March 15, 2024

Out of the Shadows is the eighth studio album by American rock band Escape the Fate. The album was released on September 1, 2023, through Big Noise Music and was produced by John Feldmann. This is the first album to feature guitarist Matti Hoffman and bassist Erik Jensen. This is also the last album to feature rhythm guitarist TJ Bell.

== Background ==
After Kevin Gruft's departure of the band, Escape the Fate brought on Matti Hoffman on lead guitar and Erik Jensen on bass. Out of the Shadows is the first Escape the Fate record to feature this new lineup.

Despite Gruft's departure, he had involvement in the songwriting process for several of the record's songs.

== Track listing ==
Out of the Shadows track listing
No.	Title	Writer(s)	Length
1.	"Forgive Me"	Feldmann, Mabbitt, Bell, Robert Ortiz, Erik Jensen, Matti Hoffman	5:03
2.	"Choke"	Feldmann, Mabbitt, Kevin Gruft, Bell, Ortiz, Jensen, Hoffman	3:13
3.	"LOW"	Feldmann, Mabbitt, Jensen, Hoffman	3:14
4.	"Rather Be Dead"	Feldmann, Matt McAndrew, Mabbitt, Gruft, Jensen	2:36
5.	"F U N in Funeral"	Feldmann, Mabbitt, Travis Mills, Gruft, Jensen, Hoffman	2:30
6.	"Lips Like Knives"	Feldmann, Mabbitt, Mills, Gruft, Jensen, Hoffman	2:41
7.	"Hypnotized"	Feldmann, Mabbitt, Nick Anderson, Gruft, Jensen, Hoffman	2:07
8.	"H8 MY SELF"	Feldmann, Mabbitt, Simon Wilcox, Bell, Ortiz, Jensen, Hoffman	2:59
9.	"Traumatized"	Feldmann, Mabbitt, Sierra Deaton, Gruft, Jensen, Hoffman	3:39
10.	"Irreversible"	Feldmann, Mabbitt, Wilcox, Gruft, Jensen, Hoffman	3:34
11.	"Kings of Nothing"	Feldmann, Mabbitt, Deaton, Jensen, Hoffman	3:14
12.	"Cheers to Goodbye" (featuring Spencer Charnas of Ice Nine Kills)	Feldmann, Mabbitt, Spencer Charnas, Bell, Ortiz, Jensen, Hoffman	3:46
Total length:			38:36

Out of the Shadows 2.0
No.	Title	Writer(s)	Length
13.	"Dearly Departed" (featuring Bert McCracken of The Used)	Feldmann, Mabbitt, Bert McCracken, Jensen, Hoffman, Bell, Ortiz	3:16
14.	"Animal"	Feldmann, Mabbitt, Jensen, Hoffman	2:10
15.	"Feral"	Feldmann, Mabbitt, Jensen, Hoffman	3:39
16.	"Legend"	Feldmann, Mabbitt, Jensen, Hoffman	3:05
17.	"Unsatisfied"	Feldmann, Mabbitt, Jensen, Hoffman	2:56
18.	"Weight of the World"	Feldmann, Mabbitt, Jensen, Hoffman	3:03
19.	"Bloodline"	Feldmann, Mabbitt, Jensen, Hoffman	3:15
20.	"Half Breed"	Feldmann, Mabbitt, Jensen, Hoffman	3:06
21.	"Out of the Shadows"	Feldmann, Mabbitt, Jensen, Hoffman, Bell, Ortiz	3:32
22.	"Rather Be Dead" (Highsociety Remix)	Feldmann, Matt McAndrew, Mabbitt, Gruft, Jensen	3:26
Total length:			67:08

== Personnel ==
Escape the Fate

- Craig Mabbitt – vocals
- Matti Hoffman – lead guitar
- TJ Bell – rhythm guitar
- Erik Jensen – bass
- Robert Ortiz – drums

Production

- John Feldmann – production
