= Chemical Warfare (Escape the Fate album) =

Studio album by Escape the Fate
- Released: April 16, 2021
- Recorded: 2020
- Studios: Foxy Studios, Woodland Hills, California
- Genres: Hard rock; easycore; pop rock
- Length: 37:59
- Label: Better Noise
- Producers: John Feldmann; Kevin Gruft

Escape the Fate chronology
I Am Human (2018)	Chemical Warfare (2021)	Out of the Shadows (2023)

Singles from Chemical Warfare
- 1. "Walk On" Released: August 28, 2020; 2. "Invincible" Released: October 16, 2020; 3. "Not My Problem" Released: January 8, 2021; 4. "Unbreakable" Released: March 5, 2021; 5. "Lightning Strike" Released: April 16, 2021

Professional ratings
Review scores
Source	Rating
Heavy Mag	6/10
Kerrang!	4/5
Metal Injection	2/10
Wall of Sound	6.5/10

Chemical Warfare is the seventh studio album by American rock band Escape the Fate, released on April 16, 2021. The album was produced by the band's lead guitarist Kevin Gruft and John Feldmann, who also previously produced the band's albums This War Is Ours and Ungrateful. The album received mixed reviews.

== Track listing ==
Chemical Warfare track listing
No.	Title	Writer(s)	Length
1.	"Lightning Strike"	Craig Mabbitt, Kevin Gruft, John Feldmann, Travis Barker, Nick Anderson	2:46
2.	"Invincible" (featuring Lindsey Stirling)	Mabbitt, Gruft, Feldmann, Lindsey Stirling, Rachel West	3:52
3.	"Unbreakable"	Mabbitt, Gruft, Feldmann, Robert Ortiz	3:02
4.	"Chemical Warfare"	Mabbitt, Gruft, Feldmann, Matt McAndrew	3:14
5.	"Erase You"	Mabbitt, Gruft, Ortiz, Feldmann, John Clark	2:28
6.	"Not My Problem" (featuring Travis Barker)	Mabbitt, Gruft, Feldmann, Barker, West	3:25
7.	"Burn the Bridges"	Mabbitt, Gruft, Ortiz, Feldmann, Joe Kirkland	3:40
8.	"Demons"	Mabbitt, Gruft, Ortiz, Feldmann, Lil Aaron	2:54
9.	"Hand Grenade"	Mabbitt, Gruft, Feldmann, Barker	2:40
10.	"Ashes (Broken World)"	Mabbitt, Gruft, McAndrew	3:05
11.	"My Gravity"	Mabbitt, Gruft, Feldmann, Liv Marisco	3:19
12.	"Walk On"	Mabbitt, Gruft, Ortiz, Feldmann	3:34
Total length:			37:59

B-Sides
No.	Title	Length
13.	"Around the Sun" (featuring Brandon Saller)	2:35
14.	"Shut Up and Listen"	3:18
15.	"Over It"	3:30
16.	"Invincible" (acoustic; featuring Lindsey Stirling)	2:59
17.	"Not My Problem" (acoustic)	2:27
Total length:		52:48

== Personnel ==
Escape the Fate

- Craig Mabbitt – lead vocals
- Kevin Gruft – lead guitar, bass, keyboards, vocals
- TJ Bell – guitar
- Robert Ortiz – drums

Additional musicians

- Brandon Saller – drums, additional vocals (tracks 2–5, 7–8, 10–15)
- Travis Barker – drums, composer (tracks 1, 6, 9)
- Joe Kirkland – piano
- Matt McAndrew – composer
- Nick Anderson – composer
- Lil Aaron – composer

Production

- Kevin Gruft – production, engineering
- John Feldmann – production, engineering, mixing
- Dylan McLean – co-production, engineering, mixing
- Scot Stewart – co-production, engineering, mixing
- Michael Bono – co-production, assistant engineering
- Jake Magness – co-producer, assistant engineering
- Victor Murgatroyd – A&R
- Alec Gousset – assistant engineering
- Josh Thornberry – assistant engineering
- Sus Boy – artwork, design
- Ted Jensen – mastering

== Charts ==
Chart performance for Escape the Fate
Chart (2021)	Peak position
German Albums (Offizielle Top 100)	94
