= I Am Human =

Studio album by Escape the Fate
- Released: March 30, 2018
- Recorded: 2016–2017
- Genres: Pop metal; post-hardcore
- Length: 46:00
- Label: Better Noise
- Producer: Howard Benson

Escape the Fate chronology
| Hate Me (2015) | I Am Human (2018) | Chemical Warfare (2021) |

Singles from I Am Human
- 1. "Empire" Released: November 2, 2017; 2. "Do You Love Me?" Released: December 1, 2017; 3. "Broken Heart" Released: January 16, 2018; 4. "Digging My Own Grave" Released: February 15, 2018; 5. "I Am Human" Released: August 17, 2018

Professional ratings
Review scores
| Source | Rating |
|---|---|
| Cryptic Rock | 4.5/5 |
| Dead Press! | 7/10 |
| Distorted Sound | 8/10 |
| Ghost Cult | 6.5/10 |
| The Soundboard | 2/10 |

I Am Human is the sixth studio album by American rock band Escape the Fate. It was released on March 30, 2018. The album's single "Broken Heart" peaked at number 15 on the Billboard Mainstream Rock Songs chart in July 2018.

== Track listing ==
I Am Human track listing
| No. | Title | Writer(s) | Length |
|---|---|---|---|
| 1. | "Beautifully Tragic" | Craig Mabbitt, Kevin Gruft, Howard Benson, Robert Ortiz | 3:14 |
| 2. | "Broken Heart" | Mabbitt, Gruft, Benson, John Pregler | 3:07 |
| 3. | "Four Letter Word" | Mabbitt, Steve Aiello, Gruft, Benson, Nick Long | 3:30 |
| 4. | "I Will Make It Up to You" | Mabbitt, Ortiz, Gruft, Bell, Benson | 3:13 |
| 5. | "Bleed for Me" | Mabbitt, Pregler, Gruft, Benson, Ortiz | 3:17 |
| 6. | "Do You Love Me?" | Mabbitt, Gruft, Benson, Pregler | 3:06 |
| 7. | "I Am Human" | Mabbitt, Gruft | 4:12 |
| 8. | "If Only" | Mabbitt, Bell, Gruft, Ortiz | 3:10 |
| 9. | "Empire" | Mabbitt, Gruft, Benson, Seann Bowe | 3:12 |
| 10. | "Recipe for Disaster" (featuring Joe Cotela of Ded) | Mabbitt, Guft, Benson, Joe Cotela | 3:24 |
| 11. | "Riot" | Gruft, Mabbitt, Pregler, Benson | 2:27 |
| 12. | "Digging My Own Grave" | Mabbitt, Ortiz, Bell, Gruft, Benson | 3:17 |
| 13. | "Resistance" | Mabbitt, Ortiz, Bell, Gruft | 3:13 |
| 14. | "Let Me Be" | Benson, Mabbitt, Bell, Gruft, Jason Phelps, Ortiz | 3:32 |
| Total length: | | | 45:54 |

Deluxe version bonus tracks
| No. | Title | Writer(s) | Length |
|---|---|---|---|
| 14. | "Dead to Me" | Mabbitt, Gruft, Bell, Ortiz | 2:44 |
| 15. | "Mask" | Mabbitt, Gruft, Bell, Ortiz | 3:30 |
| Total length: | | | 48:36 |

== Personnel ==
Escape the Fate

- TJ Bell – guitar, vocals
- Kevin Gruft – lead guitar, bass, vocals, programming, production, engineering
- Craig Mabbitt – vocals
- Robert Ortiz – drums

Additional musicians

- Howard Benson – keyboards, programming
- Diamante Azzura – background vocals
- Seann Bowe – background vocals
- Selah Ford – background vocals
- Meron Ryan – background vocals
- Sidnie Tipton – background vocals

Artwork and design

- Melody Myers – art direction, design, layout
- Sanjay Parikh – art direction

Production

- Howard Benson – production, arrangement
- Mike Plotnikoff – production, arrangement
- Hatsukazu "Hatch" Inagaki – engineering
- Zach Darf – engineering assistance
- Trevor Dietrich – engineering assistance
- Shaun Ezrol – engineering assistance
- Marc Vangool – guitar technician
- Jon Nicholson – drum technician
- Paul DeCarli – digital editing
- Evan Rodaniche – mixing

== Charts ==
Chart performance for I Am Human
| Chart (2018) | Peak position |
|---|---|
| Australian Albums (ARIA) | 39 |
| US Digital Albums (Billboard) | 19 |
| US Independent Albums (Billboard) | 8 |
| US Top Alternative Albums (Billboard) | 21 |
| US Top Rock Albums (Billboard) | 43 |
| US Top Hard Rock Albums (Billboard) | 13 |
