= Escape the Fate (album) =

Studio album by Escape the Fate
- Released: November 2, 2010
- Recorded: January–July 2010
- Genres: Alternative metal; post-hardcore; hard rock
- Length: 40:11
- Labels: DGC; Interscope
- Producer: Don Gilmore

Escape the Fate chronology
This War Is Ours (2008)	Escape the Fate (2010)	Ungrateful (2013)

Singles from Escape the Fate
- 1. "Massacre" Released: August 28, 2010; 2. "Issues" Released: September 14, 2010; 3. "City of Sin" Released: December 15, 2010; 4. "Gorgeous Nightmare" Released: June 16, 2011

Singles from Escape the Fate (Deluxe)
- 1. "Liars and Monsters" Released: August 30, 2011

Escape the Fate is the third studio album by American rock band Escape the Fate. It was released worldwide on November 2, 2010. It is the band's first and only album released on DGC/Interscope following their departure from Epitaph Records. The album charted at No. 25 on the Billboard 200, No. 1 on the Hard Rock Albums chart, No. 14 on the Rock Albums charts, No. 13 on both the Alternative and Independent charts and No. 118 on the Digital Albums Chart in the US. Upon release, the album received mixed to positive reviews, and is Escape the Fate's highest-charting album to date.

== Background and production ==
Although they dropped Ronnie Radke because of his jail sentence, the band continued to move forward with former Blessthefall singer, Craig Mabbit. In an interview during Warped Tour 2009, bassist Max Green stated that the album will feature a song co-written by Mick Mars of Mötley Crüe, who approached Escape the Fate to collaborate on some songs, but later was revealed that they decided against putting the song on the album and saving for a future release. Max Green also confirmed through Formspring that there will be a song co-written by guitarist John 5 of Rob Zombie, later seen to be "Liars and Monsters".

On April 23, vocalist Craig Mabbitt stated via Twitter, "off to vegas today to finish out last minute badass demos with monte, then off to bamboozle, then studio time", giving the notion that the band will begin recording their studio album directly after The Bamboozle, and release it mid/late Summer 2010. Soon after, Mabbitt stated through his Twitter account that the band had a few more songs to record, and that the new album will be coming sooner than expected. He has also hinted towards there being a third Guillotine song on the album, "The Aftermath".

During early recording, Max Green was questioned on Formspring about the band possibly changing record labels. Max responded by saying that he will reveal all of that at a later time. This would make the record the first to be released without Epitaph Records. On July 26, Escape the Fate confirmed that the new record will be released through major record label, DGC/Interscope Records. Craig Mabbitt stated that the band had no issues with Epitaph but the appeal to bring their music to a wider audience led to their signing with Interscope. The band was initially worried about switching but were pleased that neither the new label or the new producer wanted to change or control the band. "Interscope was hopping on board with us, instead of us hopping on board with Interscope." In the same press release, they have listed Don Gilmore as the album's producer, who has worked with bands such as Linkin Park, Bullet for My Valentine, and Hollywood Undead. A November 2 release date was also confirmed. Speaking about the album, Max Green commented, "This record is the cure for the modern day music epidemic, We are wiping the slate clean and re-writing rock music as you know it.”

== Writing and recording ==
The band had been working on the album since the release of This War is Ours in 2008. Being able to completely form the writing and recording process with the current lineup for the first time, the band felt that the album would be a great representation for the band. This is due to the fact that when Mabbitt first joined the band, he felt very rushed to write a record and fit into an already established band. In addition, the debut on a major label also led to the band choosing to self-title the album. Lyrically, the album is heavier and darker than previous efforts, according to Mabbitt. In an interview, he explained the choice of direction for the album in that they were, "figuring out what we enjoy playing live, what we enjoy listening to on our record." Mabbitt feels that the past two albums have been working up to Escape the Fate and that this direction will continue with future releases. For writing, Craig Mabbitt expressed that he believes it is more important to focus on what the band enjoys doing rather than copying other bands for success. "[We] definitely could have been like, ‘Oh, let's throw another minute-long solo, let's do a chugga-chug here, let's scream over this, and let's sound like every other band and put the same song on the record ten times so that we have a one song, ten different track album.'... we just like to be very diverse..." On working with producer Don Gilmore, the band said that he helped them "find themselves" and continue to push different parts of the song until they formed a record they were satisfied with. Mabbitt also praised Gilmore for his ability to perfect the album without affecting their music. Commenting on the album, Mabbitt feels that "This record has the heaviest song the band has ever written, it has the softest ballad the band has ever written, it has the craziest solo Monte has ever written. The whole record just has everything in it."

For inspiration, Craig Mabbitt said that he drew experiences from many things, stating, "I wanted to write about every emotion that you can get from life, everything that kind of happens, every kind of story I've heard that really upset me." The track "Lost in Darkness" tells the story about one of Mabbitt's friends who was dragged out of her home and raped at gunpoint. Mabbitt stated that, "[She] was screaming for help and nobody helped her at all. Everybody just turned the other cheek. That was something that really struck me, and I see that happening a lot, just people not wanting to lend a helping hand to people when somebody is hurting... That's definitely where I went with that song." The second track, "Massacre", is about Mabbitt's past addictions and the things he did to overcome them. The ballad track "World Around Me" takes a broader view and was written about life in general. "[World Around Me is] about relationships with my ex and my child, everything accumulated into one song." The closing track, "The Aftermath (The Guillotine III)", is the third song under the Guillotine series started by Ronnie Radke with the first song titled "The Guillotine", inspired by the Halo series, from Dying Is Your Latest Fashion. When Mabbitt joined, a song entitled "This War Is Ours (The Guillotine II)" was included on This War Is Ours and was also about Halo; however, it was written in relation to real-life soldiers in battle. For the series, Mabbitt wrote a third Guillotine song but did not want to base it off of Halo again. Instead, he wrote a more personal track about his father who was in the military when Mabbitt was a child. "[The] chorus, ‘Now I'm coming home,' is an ode to my Dad and an ode to all the soldiers out there who are fighting a war for us and waiting to come home to their families." As a whole, Mabbitt feels that, "every track has a completely different underlying story to it."

Vocally, Mabbitt experimented for the album. On both tracks "Lost in Darkness" and "Liars and Monsters", a track that appears on the Deluxe Edition of the album, he sang at the lowest pitch he has done yet for a track. On the track "Zombie Dance", Mabbitt described the recording process and that he recorded five layers of vocal harmony for the final mix in addition to little sound effects. He explained it was difficult to achieve the high harmonies and right pitches right for all of the tracks. Another difficulty he experienced while recording was boosting the endings of songs for an epic feels. Despite this, Craig stated he enjoyed experimenting and that he "can't wait to keep on going back into the studio and experimenting on a ton of different things."

Rather than have eleven tracks for the regular version of the album, the band wanted to include both "Liars and Monsters" and "The Final Blow" from the deluxe edition on the album. The decision to put them as bonus tracks were encouraged to keep the length and tracks on the album to a manageable size. Mabbitt jokingly stated that the band recorded so much material, almost two albums worth, that he "just want[ed] to record everything and just release a 20 track album." There were at least six or seven tracks recorded that did not make the cut for the album. Two ballads and about five heavier songs were cut because the band had to decide "Which one is the strongest one? Which one do we have most vocals to? What's going to fit in the diversity of the record?" This was to give the fans variety rather than having a straight, one-genre record. On this, Mabbitt commented, "We could have thrown those songs on there and not put "World Around Me" or "Gorgeous Nightmare" or "Zombie Dance" or "Issues" or anything like that. It would have been more like a straightforward record. That's not what we like to do. We like to have a lot of that diversity in our sound." Another track, entitled "Dream" was fully recorded and mixed for the final cut of the album. Before finalizing, however, Monte Money decided to rerecord the guitar part with a lower tune to change the sound of the song. After rerecording, the band agreed they liked the original version better but the deadline for the record did not allow them to finish the song in time so they are going to keep it for a later release.

== Release and promotion ==
On August 23, Escape the Fate updated their Myspace homepage with a new logo and some information about the new album. The band's new logo is to be featured on the cover of the album. Mabbitt has also stated on his Twitter that the band has shot a music video for a new song. On August 28, the band released a new song called "Massacre" for download on their website, the song was later confirmed as a pre-album single. "Massacre" charted 19 in Rock Chart. The next single, titled "Issues", was originally planned to be released on September 14 but was leaked early on KROQ Radio on September 9. To promote the album, Escape the Fate will take on a US and Canada tour prior to releasing it, touring with Bullet for My Valentine, Drive-A and Black Tide.

On September 27 the band revealed the album cover exclusively through Artist Direct. The cover contains the new "Escape the Fate" logo, as was previously shown on the singles "Massacre" and "Issues". Below the logo adorns the four band members profiles with scarred and mangled faces, all in front of a solid black backdrop. On October 2, the track list was released. On October 3, the band began playing the song "Day of Wreckoning" during live shows, the very first being at Toad's Place in Connecticut. On October 26 band began playing "City of Sin". On October 29, the album was released in the United States by means of Pre-Order. On October 30, the band started streaming the regular edition of the album on their Myspace.

Following Max Green's admittance to rehabilitation, the band decided to pull out of the rest of the European tour with Bullet for My Valentine to allow Green time to recover. Instead, to promote the album, the band will be headlining their own tour called "The Dead Masquerade Tour", a title stemming from a lyric in the track "Zombie Dance". The tour will begin in January 2011 and will feature supporting acts including: Alesana, Motionless in White, Get Scared and Drive-A. and Max Green will be back in time to begin touring.

Despite the second single being announced as "Zombie Dance", the band released a music video for "City of Sin" instead on December 15, 2010. This is due to Max Green still being in rehab, and therefore was unavailable to shoot a video. Still wanting to release a single before beginning their 2011 headlining tour, they released footage of a live concert inside a Las Vegas strip joint, similar to the format of the video for "This War Is Ours (The Guillotine II)", but with higher production value. The video also contains segments of strippers dancing around a stage, appealing to the title "City of Sin".

=== Deluxe edition ===
On October 3, Amazon.com put to sale the pre-order of the Deluxe Edition version of the new album. The deluxe edition has an alternative cover, will be in format CD, and in addition it is going to contain new material to the normal version. New material includes a digital booklet and three new songs: "Liars And Monsters", and "The Final Blow", as well as a remixed version of "Issues". On October 29, the deluxe edition of the album was released in the United States by means of pre-order, along with the standard edition pre-orders. Escape The Fate have released a stream of a remix of "Issues" from their new self-titled album. The deluxe edition of the album in the UK includes another remix track of "Issues" by British Synth band Does It Offend You, Yeah?.

== Reception ==
=== Critical ===
Professional ratings
Review scores
Source	Rating
AllMusic	3/5 stars

Escape the Fate received mixed to positive reviews upon its release. Greogory Heaney of AllMusic complimented the Gilmore's production on the album, calling it the "slickest and most “produced”-sounding album to date, with lots of electronic ambience and editing tricks working together to craft a highly polished yet darkly foreboding atmosphere".

=== Commercial ===
Escape the Fate debuted in the U.S. at No. 25 on the Billboard 200, selling around 18,000 copies in the first week. The bands' previous album, This War Is Ours, was the best-selling effort for them and had only sold 13,000 copies in its first week, debuting at No. 35 on the Billboard 200, making Escape The Fate their most successful record to date. In addition, their previous albums had not charted anywhere outside the United States and Canada. Their self-titled album charted at No. 58 on the Australian charts. The album being the band's most successful chart-wise may be attributed to switching to a major record label, Interscope, to promote the album.

As of January 15, 2011, the album has sold 50,379 copies in the United States.

== Track listing ==
All tracks are written by Max Green, Craig Mabbitt, Monte Money, Michael Money, and Robert Ortiz, except where noted

Standard edition
No.	Title	Writer(s)	Length
1.	"Choose Your Fate"		1:41
2.	"Massacre"		4:15
3.	"Issues"		2:42
4.	"Zombie Dance"	Jay Gordon, Green, Mabbitt, Money, Money, Ortiz	3:18
5.	"Gorgeous Nightmare"		3:16
6.	"City of Sin"	Gordon, Green, Mabbitt, Money, Money, Ortiz	2:43
7.	"Day of Wreckoning"		3:15
8.	"Lost in Darkness"		3:41
9.	"Prepare Your Weapon"		4:41
10.	"World Around Me"	Gordon, Green, Mabbitt, Money, Money, Ortiz	5:09
11.	"The Aftermath (The Guillotine III)" (titled "The Aftermath (G3)" on Spotify)		5:34
Total length:			40:11

Deluxe edition
No.	Title	Writer(s)	Length
12.	"Liars and Monsters"	John 5, Green, Mabbitt, Money, Money, Ortiz	3:22
13.	"The Final Blow"		3:21
14.	"Issues" (Ruxpin remix)		5:25
Total length:			52:19

UK deluxe edition bonus track
No.	Title	Length
15.	"Issues" (Does It Offend You, Yeah? remix)	3:50
Total length:		56:09

Instrumental edition
No.	Title	Length
1.	"Choose Your Fate" (Instrumental)	1:43
2.	"Massacre" (Instrumental)	4:17
3.	"Issues" (Instrumental)	2:44
4.	"Zombie Dance" (Instrumental)	3:19
5.	"Gorgeous Nightmare" (Instrumental)	3:18
6.	"City of Sin" (Instrumental)	2:44
7.	"Day of Wreckoning" (Instrumental)	3:16
8.	"Lost in Darkness" (Instrumental)	3:43
9.	"Prepare Your Weapon" (Instrumental)	4:43
10.	"World Around Me" (Instrumental)	5:10
11.	"The Aftermath (G3)" (Instrumental)	5:40
12.	"Dream" (Instrumental)	3:19
13.	"Liars and Monsters" (Instrumental)	3:24
14.	"The Final Blow" (Instrumental)	3:21
Total length:		50:47

Note

- "Lost in Darkness" contains a sample of "Sweet Dreams (Are Made of This)" by Marilyn Manson

== Personnel ==
Escape the Fate album personnel as listed on AllMusic.

Escape the Fate

- Craig Mabbitt – lead vocals
- Monte Money – guitar, vocals, keyboards
- Max Green – bass
- Robert Ortiz – drums

Additional musicians

- Rory Frosinos-Mabbitt – vocals on Massacre and Zombie Dance
- Jay Gordon – composer
- John 5 – composer
- Michael Money – rhythm guitar
- Bart Hendrickson – synthesizers, programming

Artwork and design

- P.R. Brown – art direction, photography

Production

- Keith Armstrong – assistant engineering
- Don Gilmore – production
- Ted Jensen – mastering
- Nik Karpen – assistant engineering
- Mark Kiczula – engineering
- Chris Lord-Alge – mixing
- Monte Money – production
- Jackie Petri – A&R
- Andrew Schubert – mixing
- Les Scurry – production
- Jeff Sosnow – A&R
- Brad Townsend – mixing

== Charts ==
Chart (2010)	Peak position
Australian Albums Chart	58
UK Albums Chart	145
US Billboard 200	25
US Top Digital Albums	18
US Top Tastemaker Albums	1
US Top Hard Rock Albums	1
US Top Alternative Albums	3
US Top Rock Albums	4
US Top Independent Albums	3

== Release history ==
Region	Date	Label
Via pre-order USA	October 29, 2010	Interscope
Via pre-order	October 30, 2010	Interscope
In stores USA	November 2, 2010	Interscope
In stores UK & worldwide	November 1, 2010	Interscope
