= Ungrateful (album) =

Studio album by Escape the Fate
- Released: May 14, 2013
- Recorded: February–September 2012
- Genres: Heavy metal; metalcore; hard rock
- Length: 39:36
- Label: Eleven Seven
- Producers: John Feldmann; Monte Money; Brandon Saller

Escape the Fate chronology
Escape the Fate (2010)	Ungrateful (2013)	Hate Me (2015)

Singles from Ungrateful
- 1. "Ungrateful" Released: February 12, 2013; 2. "You're Insane" Released: March 18, 2013; 3. "One For The Money" Released: 10 September 2013; 4. "Picture Perfect" Released: 6 May 2014

Ungrateful is the fourth studio album by American rock band Escape the Fate, released on May 14, 2013, through Eleven Seven. Several of the tracks on the album were produced by John Feldmann, who also produced the band's second album This War Is Ours; however, other tracks were either produced by Brandon Saller or by the band's lead guitarist Monte Money.

== Background ==
Since the release of their third album, Escape the Fate, the band had begun writing material for their tentative fourth album. Recording began in February 2012, following the recording for Craig Mabbitt's solo project Dead Rabbitts, and ended in March. The band hinted towards the new album on a Facebook post on New Year's Eve saying, "Happy new year everyone. We love you all. Next year will see a new album for all of you!!!". The band's lead guitarist, Monte, originally left their tour in 2011 because he did not feel comfortable around Max Green. During his absence from the tour, he recorded over a hundred guitar demos for the album. In March 2012, the band announced that bassist Max Green had left the band due to personal differences. Despite the departure, Green remained friends with the band to the point where he even attended a concert by them. To replace Green, the band made former Motionless in White member, TJ Bell, who had already been touring with the band since early 2011 in place of Max, an official member. Along with this, the band also announced that touring member, Michael Money, had become an official member, providing rhythm guitar for the band.

On Twitter, Mabbitt and TJ Bell revealed that Patrick Stump was working with the band to write a new track. This was later confirmed and the title of the song is "Painting", and ultimately the album was titled "Picture Perfect". In an interview, the band spoke about the song they wrote with Mick Mars of Mötley Crüe. Mabbitt said that although they liked the track, they did not feel it was right for them, thus voting against using it.

On December 17, 2012, the band released a short clip of an upcoming track titled "Ungrateful", along with the official statement regarding joining Eleven Seven Music. Mabbitt commented on joining the label, saying, "We are excited to be working with Allen and all the people at Eleven Seven Music and having Monster partner with us in 2013! We are stoked to get shit rolling again and we are thankful for all our fans that have stuck with us during this down time. We hope everyone is ready to go hard with us in 2013." Eleven Seven Music EVP Joe McFadden added, "We are extremely excited to have signed ESCAPE THE FATE. We've been watching them for some time now and we look forward to working with them as they define the future of rock and roll."

== Singles and promotion ==
To promote the album, the band co-headlined the This World Is Ours tour with metalcore band Attack Attack!. Other acts on the tour included The Word Alive, Secrets, and Mest. The first leg of the tour was in North America, and started on April 5, 2012, in Buffalo, New York, and ended in Vancouver, Canada on May 16. On the tour, the band played a new song from the fourth album titled "Live Fast, Die Beautiful" with Attack Attack! lead singer Caleb Shomo possibly hinting towards him being featured on the song, which ultimately didn't end up happening, although Shomo helped write the song. There was originally going to be a second leg of the tour in Central and South America, starting on June 23 in Curitiba, Brazil, and ending on July 1 in Mexico City, Mexico, but Attack Attack! announced that they were cancelling it. Escape the Fate then announced that instead, they will be joining Underoath and Protest the Hero on a different South American tour, starting on May 26 in Curitiba, Brazil, and ending on May 30 in Santiago, Chile.

The first single from the album, "Ungrateful" was released on February 12. The song was made available for free during the first 24 hours of the release on the Alternative Press website, as a thank you to the fans. They have also shot a video for "Ungrateful", on March 7 a music video for "Ungrateful" was released. On March 18, the next single, "You're Insane" was also made available for those who pre-ordered the album, and on April 1 the music video was released as well.

On April 29, Escape the Fate streamed their song, "Until We Die" through Artistdirect. To further promote the album, the band will partake in several music festivals in 2013, including Rock on the Range, Rocklahoma, and others. A track entitled, "Forever" was said to appear on the physical deluxe version but it never did and instead of "Losing Control" being on it they were replaced by, "I Alone" & "Father, Brother" instead, with "Losing Control" being an iTunes exclusive along with "Apologize" being a Japanese exclusive.

== Reception ==
=== Commercial ===
Ungrateful debuted in the United States at number 27 on the Billboard 200, with sales of around 17,000 copies in its debut week. This nearly matches the sales and chart rankings of their previous album, Escape the Fate, which charted at number 25 on the Billboard 200 with around 18,000 copies in its first week. Despite not charting as high on the Billboard 200 as their self-titled album did, Ungrateful charted at number 34 on the Australian charts, which is significantly higher than their self-titled, which charted at number 58.

On smaller charts, the album debuted at number 2 on the U.S. Hard Rock albums chart, number 22 on the Top Digital Albums chart, number 6 on the Top Alternative Albums chart, number 7 on the Top Rock albums chart, and number 5 on the Top Independent Albums chart.

In February 2026, their single "One for the money" was certified platinum on the RIAA.

=== Critical response ===
Professional ratings
Review scores
Source	Rating
AllMusic	3/5 stars
Alternative Press	2/5 stars
Kerrang!	4/5 stars
Q Magazine	2/5 stars
Rock Sound	3/5 stars

Ungrateful received mixed reviews from critics. On Metacritic, which assigns a normalized rating out of 100, the album currently holds a 56, indicating "mixed or average reviews".

== Chart positions ==
Chart (2013)	Peak position
Australian Albums Chart	34
US Billboard 200	27
US Top Digital Albums	22
US Top Hard Rock Albums	2
US Top Alternative Albums	6
US Top Rock Albums	7
US Top Independent Albums	5

== Track listing ==
No.	Title	Writer(s)	Producer	Length
1.	"Ungrateful"	Brandon Saller, Monte Money, Michael Money	Monte Money, Saller	3:23
2.	"Until We Die"	Craig Mabbitt, Monte Money, Michael Money	Money, Saller	4:26
3.	"Live Fast, Die Beautiful"	John Feldmann, Caleb Shomo, Mabbitt, Monte Money, Michael Money	Feldmann	3:52
4.	"Forget About Me"	Feldmann, Martin Johnson, Monte Money, Michael Money, Mabbitt	Feldmann	3:02
5.	"You're Insane"	Saller, Monte Money, Michael Money	Money, Saller	3:34
6.	"Chemical Love"	Mabbitt, Monte Money, Michael Money	Money, Saller	3:29
7.	"Picture Perfect" (featuring Patrick Stump)	Feldmann, Stump, Mabbitt, Monte Money, Michael Money	Feldmann	3:51
8.	"Risk It All"	Feldmann, Monte Money, Michael Money	Feldmann	4:00
9.	"Desire"	J Angel, Monte Money, Michael Money	Feldmann	2:45
10.	"One for the Money"	Feldmann, Johnson, Mabbitt, Monte Money, Michael Money	Feldmann	3:19
11.	"Fire It Up"	Saller, Joe Cotela, Julien Jorgenson, Matt McCloskey, Monte Money, Michael Money, Mabbitt	Money, Saller	3:53
Total length:				39:36

Deluxe version
No.	Title	Writer(s)	Producer	Length
12.	"I, Alone"	Feldmann, Mabbitt, Monte Money, Michael Money	Money, Saller, Feldmann	3:53
13.	"Father, Brother"	Mabbitt, Monte Money, Michael Money	Money, Saller, Feldmann	2:47
Total length:				46:16

Japanese deluxe version
No.	Title	Writer(s)	Producer	Length
14.	"Losing Control"	Monte Money, Michael Money, Mabbitt, Bell, Ortiz	Money, Saller, Feldmann	3:53
15.	"Apologize"	Monte Money, Michael Money, Mabbitt, Bell, Ortiz	Money, Saller, Feldmann	3:16
Total length:				49:58

Deluxe version bonus DVD
No.	Title	Length
1.	"Escape the Fate: Live from the Roxy" (Video)	52:56
2.	"Ungrateful" (music video)	5:24
3.	"You're Insane" (music video)	3:48
Total length:		1:02:08

== Personnel ==
Escape the Fate

- Craig Mabbitt – vocals
- Monte Money – guitar, keyboards
- Michael Money – guitar
- TJ Bell – bass
- Robert Ortiz – drums

Production

- John Feldmann – executive producer
- Brandon Saller – composer, producer, vocals
- Caleb Shomo – composer
- Patrick Stump – composer
- Martin Johnson – composer
- Clay Busch – executive producer, management
- Danny Wimmer – executive producer, management
- Christian Coffey – management
- Julien Jorgenson – composer
- Matt McCloskey – composer
- Joe Cotela – composer
- Courtney Ballard – engineer, programming
- Jeremy Hatcher – engineer, programming
- Brandon Paddock – engineer, programming
- Matt Pauling – engineer
- Brad Blackwood – mastering
- Josh Wilbur – mixing
