= Craig Mabbitt =

American singer (born 1987)

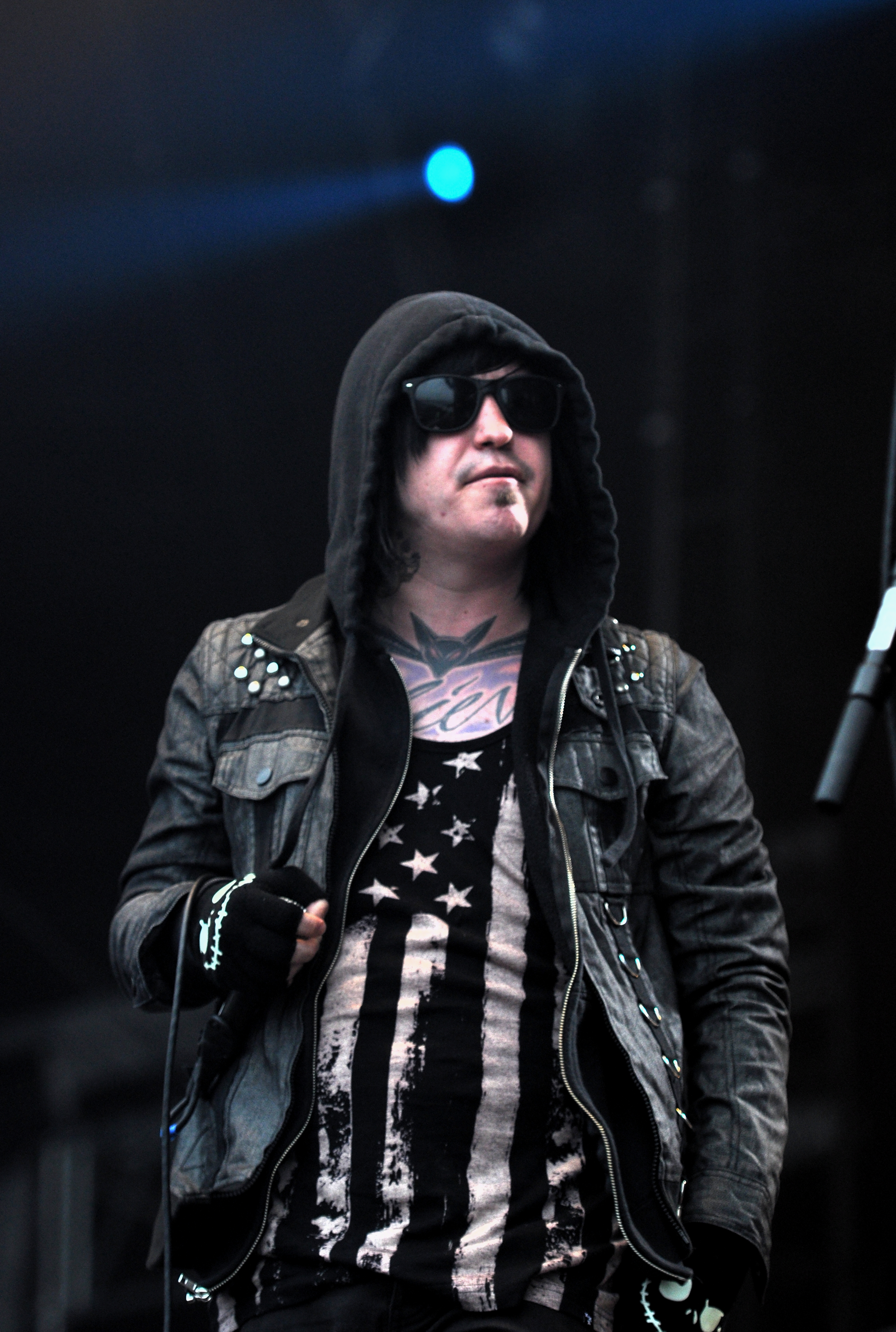
- Mabbitt in 2013

Background information
- Born: Craig Edward Mabbitt; April 9, 1987 (age 39); Phoenix, Arizona, U.S.
- Genres: Post-hardcore; emo; screamo; metalcore; hard rock
- Occupations: Singer; songwriter
- Years active: 2003–present
- Member of: Escape the Fate; Dead Rabbitts
- Formerly of: Blessthefall; The Word Alive
- Children: 2

Craig Edward Mabbitt (born April 9, 1987) is an American singer who is the frontman of the rock band Escape the Fate. He was formerly the lead vocalist for Blessthefall and The Word Alive. He is also the lead vocalist of his side-project band Dead Rabbitts.

== Early life ==
In his early childhood, Mabbitt required the frequent and scheduled use of a nebulizer as a result of severe asthma. He also had to attend a special class due to a speech disorder, but nevertheless he overcame these setbacks, and in his adolescent years, realized his "dream of becoming a singer in a rock band."

== Career ==
=== Blessthefall (2003–2008) ===
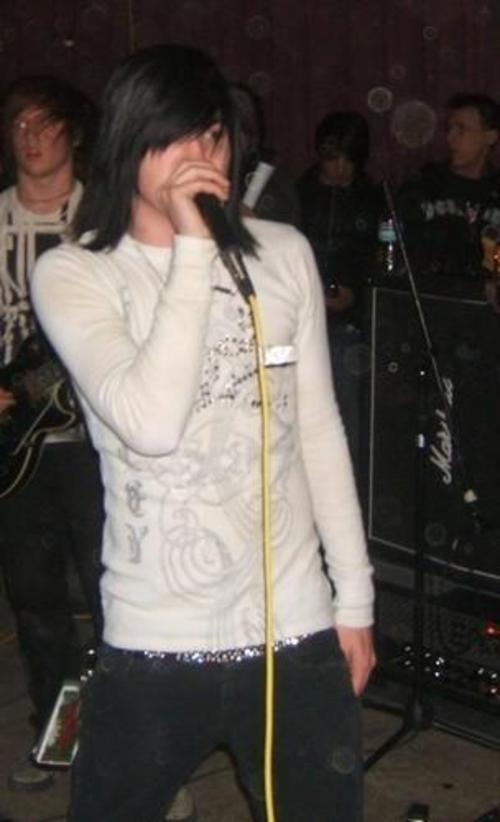
Mabbitt with Blessthefall in 2007

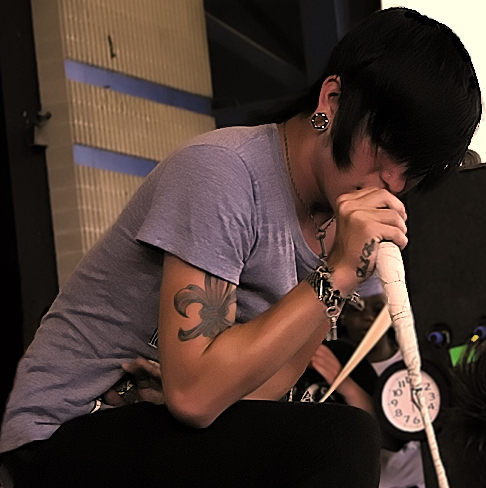
Mabbitt with Blessthefall at the Warped Tour 2007

While with Blessthefall, Mabbitt released two self-released EPs and one full-length album. Their first full album, His Last Walk, was released on April 10, 2007, on Science Records/Ferret Music. It produced four singles, the last of which, "Rise Up", was released after he left the band, and he does not appear in the video.

In the middle of their 2007 European Tour with Silverstein and The Vincent Black Shadow, Mabbitt left the band for personal reasons, and was replaced by Beau Bokan, the former lead vocalist for Take the Crown.

=== The Word Alive (2008) ===
Mabbitt founded the metalcore band The Word Alive in Phoenix in 2008 as a side project while also performing in Escape the Fate. He and the group recorded songs for an EP that was never officially released, and November 2008 the band dropped Mabbitt, claiming complications due to his involvement with Escape the Fate. Mabbitt was replaced by Tyler Smith, formerly the bassist of Greeley Estates and singer/keyboardist of In Fear and Faith; since then, The Word Alive has released an EP and six albums.

=== Escape the Fate (2008–present) ===
After singer Ronnie Radke was sentenced to five years' probation for battery charges (and then two years' imprisonment for failure to report to his probation officer) Escape the Fate turned to Mabbitt, who had played with them on the Black on Black Tour while with Blessthefall. After several trial shows he became the official new singer and they entered the studio to record their second full-length album This War Is Ours, which was released on October 21, 2008. It was the first Escape the Fate album with Mabbitt as singer; the album was a commercial success, entering at No. 35 on the Billboard 200 and selling 13,000 copies in the first week.

The third studio album from the band and second to feature Mabbitt was Escape the Fate which was released on November 2, 2010, and is the band's most successful album to date charting No. 25 on the Billboard 200, No. 1 at Hard Rock Albums, No. 14 in a Rock Albums, No. 13 in Alternative and Independent charts and No. 118 in Digital Albums Chart.

On May 14, 2013, the band released their fourth studio album and third with Mabbitt, Ungrateful. On October 30, 2015, the band released their fifth studio album and fourth with Mabbitt "Hate Me". The band released their sixth studio album, I Am Human, on March 30, 2018. On April 16, 2021, the band released their seventh studio album and sixth with Mabbitt, Chemical Warfare. On September 1, 2023, the band released their eighth studio album and seventh with Mabbitt, Out of the Shadows.

=== Dead Rabbitts (2011–present) ===
In late 2013, Mabbitt and the band announced the release of their full-length debut album sometime in 2014. In December, they began recording songs with Andrew Wade, On May 16, the band released their first single, "My Only Regret" from their debut album Shapeshifter, which was released on July 1, 2014. The album debuted at No. 127 on the Billboard 200. The band released their second studio album, This Emptiness, on April 17, 2017. On October 25, 2019, the band released "Dead by Daylight", a single written by Mabbitt with his son, Mizo, as a guest vocalist. It is based on the horror survival video game Dead by Daylight.

=== Solo (2020) ===
Mabbitt released his first solo song, "Never Be", through SoundCloud on April 9, 2020. It was released to celebrate his 33rd birthday.

== Discography ==
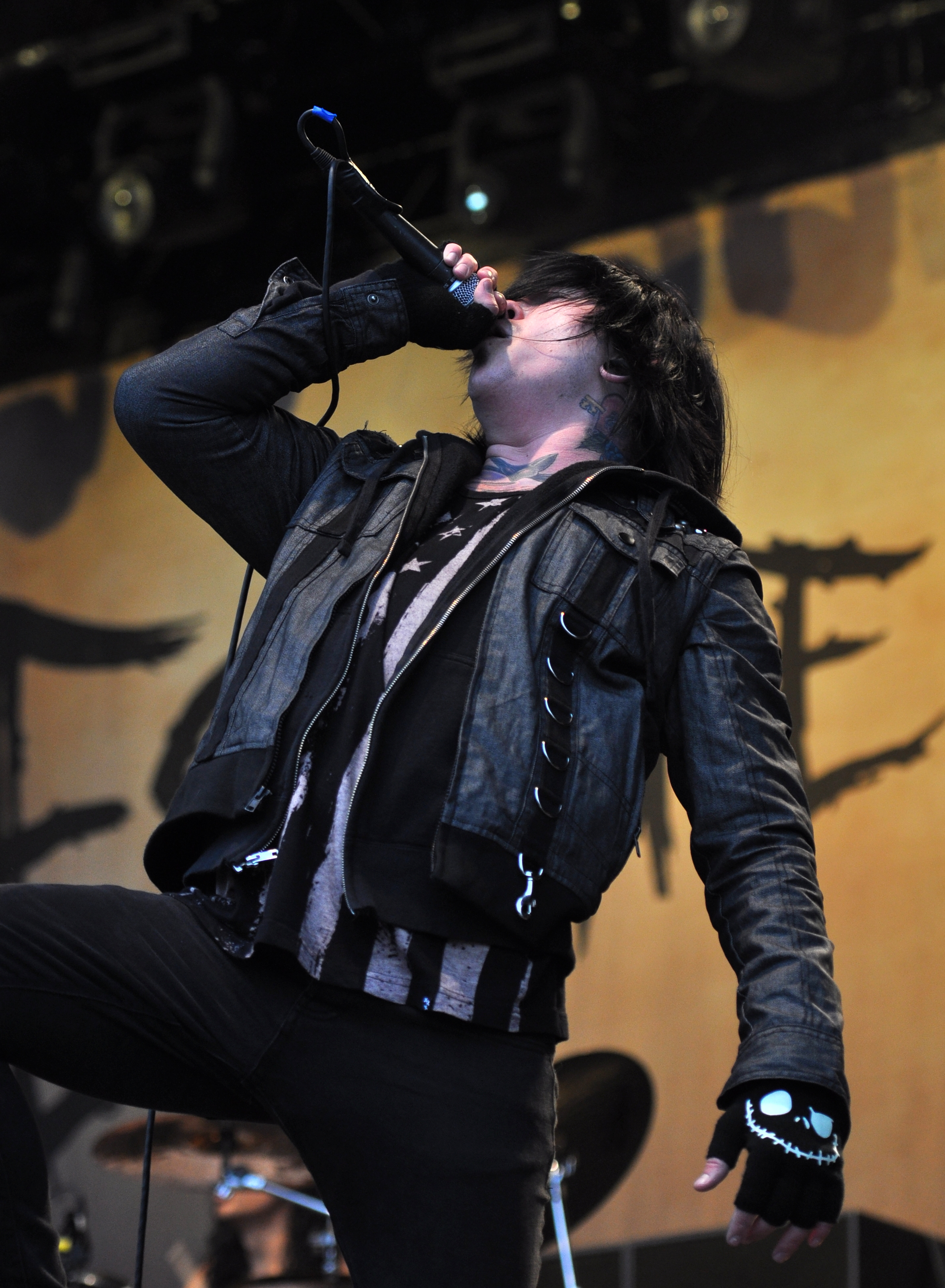
Mabbitt with Escape the Fate in 2013

Solo

- "Never Be" (single, 2020)
- "One More Light" (Linkin Park cover, 2020)
- "Hollywood's Bleeding" (Post Malone cover, 2020)

Blessthefall

- Black Rose Dying (ЕР) (2005)
- Blessthefall (ЕР) (2006)
- His Last Walk (2007)

The Word Alive

- The Word Alive (ЕР) (2008)

Escape the Fate

- This War Is Ours (2008)
- Escape the Fate (2010)
- Ungrateful (2013)
- Hate Me (2015)
- I Am Human (2018)
- Chemical Warfare (2021)
- Out of the Shadows (2023)
- The Last Goodbye (2026)

Dead Rabbitts

- Edge of Reality (ЕР) (2012)
- Shapeshifter (2014)
- This Emptiness (2017)
- Break the Static (ЕР) (2019)
- Rumination (2022)
- Redefined (2025)

== Collaborations ==
Year	Song	Album	Artist
2009	"Deadly Weapons" (featuring Craig Mabbitt)	The World Outside	Eyes Set to Kill
2009	"All That I'm About" (featuring Craig Mabbitt)	Single	DJ Club
2010	"I Shot the Maid" (featuring Cameron Martin, Craig Mabbitt & Jared Warth)	No Rain, No Rainbow	Greeley Estates
2010	"Jealousy Breeds Killing Sprees" (featuring Craig Mabbitt)	No Rain, No Rainbow	Greeley Estates
2010	"Ignore the End" (featuring Craig Mabbitt)	Forget to Remember	Kisses for Kings
2011	"Sarcasm" (featuring Craig Mabbitt)	Best Kind of Mess	Get Scared
2013	"Bury the Hatchet" (featuring Craig Mabbitt)	Watch Me (mixtape)	Ronnie Radke
2014	"(A)Tension" (featuring Craig Mabbitt)	Changes	Versus Me
2014	"EarthQuake" (featuring Craig Mabbitt)	After Hours	Glamour of the Kill
2015	"Pure Horror" (featuring Craig Mabbitt)	Aiden	Aiden
2018	"Summer" (featuring Craig Mabbitt & Mega Ran)	Iridescent	Whitney Peyton
2021	"The Comeback" (featuring Craig Mabbitt)	A Hope in Hell	All Good Things
2021	"It's Killin' Time Baby!" (featuring Craig Mabbitt)	Eye for an Eye...	Butcher Babies
2022	"Darkness" (featuring Craig Mabbitt)	Single	Mitch Jones
2022	"Alive" (featuring Craig Mabbitt)	HELIX	SNAILS
2023	"To the Wolves" (featuring Craig Mabbitt)	To the Wolves	Stitched Up Heart
2023	"Fade Away" (featuring Craig Mabbitt)	Hard Reset	The Word Alive
2024	"Play the Game" (featuring Craig Mabbitt)	Single	Adventure Club and Bear Grillz
2024	"Masochistic Lovers" (featuring Craig Mabbitt)	New Addiction	The Haunt
2025	"Adrenaline" (featuring Craig Mabbitt)	Maps Written in Water	Scary Kids Scaring Kids
2025	"Worth It" (featuring Craig Mabbitt)	X's for Eyes	The Red Jumpsuit Apparatus
