= Nick Anderson (musician) =

American songwriter (born 1995)

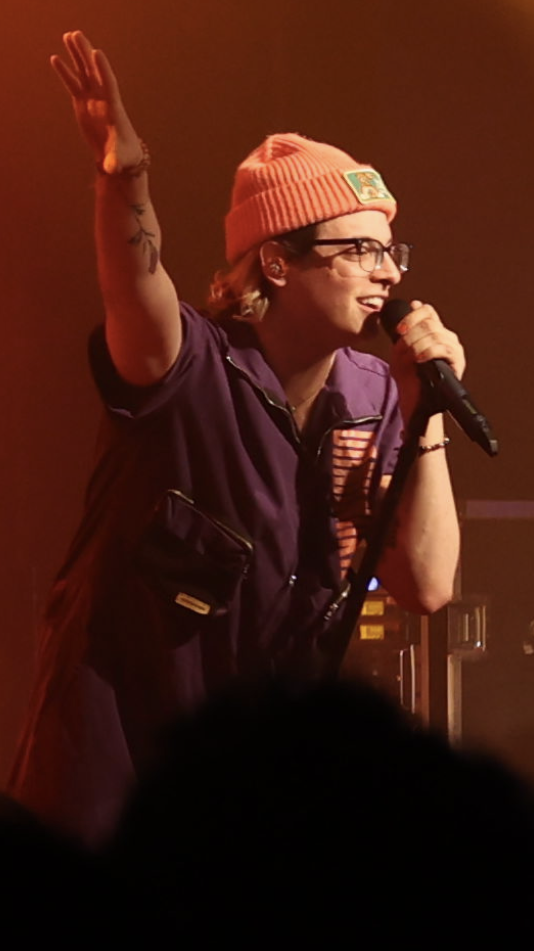
- Anderson at Toad's Place touring for The Wrecks' album Sonder, 2022

Background information
- Born: Nicholas Michael Anderson; April 26, 1995 (age 31); Wellsville, New York
- Genres: Alternative rock; pop-punk; indie rock; DIY music
- Occupations: Producer; Singer; Songwriter; Musician; Feminist
- Instruments: Vocals; Guitar; Piano; Keyboard
- Years active: 2012–present
- Labels: Another Century; Big Noise Music Group; Lava Records
- Member of: The Wrecks

Nicholas Michael Anderson (born April 26, 1995) is an American singer-songwriter, multi-instrumentalist, and record producer. He is best known as the frontman of the alternative rock band The Wrecks since its formation in 2015. He remains their primary producer and lyricist but has recently collaborated with a variety of artists on projects outside the scope of The Wrecks.

== Early life ==
Anderson was born in Western New York to John Anderson, an editor for the Daily News and the Tyler Morning Telegraph, and Kasey Ross Riley, a school secretary. He grew up in rural Wellsville, the second oldest of five siblings. He learned to play the piano at eight years old and taught himself to play the guitar at fourteen. He cites his early experience in producing to experimenting in GarageBand on the iMac at his father's workplace. In December 2012, he formed pop punk cover band Exit Plan with Tyler Cornell, Jesse McKee, and Jimmy Dixon. The band released a four-track CD and a non-album single.

Aside from music, Anderson was also proficient in baseball. Anderson pitched for a varsity team at Wellsville High School from 2011 until his graduation in 2013. After setting several regional records, he played for San Diego City College in California, pursuing a two-year major in digital audio technology alongside baseball. Around this time, Anderson was a successful contestant on gameshow Let's Make a Deal. While balancing his college career, Anderson continued performing at various San Diego music festivals with Exit Plan.

== Career ==
Anderson met future bandmate Aaron Kelley on Facebook around 2010. Remaining friends through 2014, Kelley introduced Anderson to recording industry executive Richard Reines, of whom he was interning for at the time, and Anderson began writing and producing for the bands that Reines managed. In September 2014, Anderson and Cornell formed a pop-punk band, Coastbound, with Kelley and others – Kyle Hulett, Steven Groot, and Taylor Enzminger. The group released five-track EP Wasting Your Breath and a mildly successful cover of The Weeknd's "The Hills." Coastbound continued performing at local music festivals in California throughout 2015; however, in September 2015, Anderson and Kelley announced their intentions to place the band on a hiatus to pursue a "new music endeavor with an indie rock project." Sometime in October 2015, Anderson's new project released a song, "Get 'Em Ready", which features in Episode 5 of CBS's Limitless.

=== The Wrecks ===
In late 2015, Anderson and Kelley invited Billy Nally, Harrison Nussbaum, and Nick "Schmizz" Schmidt to join their new project. In regards to how he met his other band members, Anderson stated, "We weren't picked out... we all knew each other from other bands and projects. I was starting this band and I knew these guys were really talented and I asked them to join it and they all agreed to move to Los Angeles and do it with me."

The Wrecks had formally begun in Thousand Oaks, California, in mid-November 2015. Through a friend's housekeeping engagement, Anderson gained access to a professional home studio, albeit without the owner's permission, and the group self-recorded three tracks for an extended play in just three days, with roommate, sound engineer, and Coastbound collaborator Andrew D'Angelo serving as co-producer. On December 22, 2016, the line-up signed with Another Century Records. Soon after, their debut single "Favorite Liar" received significant airplay and charted in the top forty on alternative radio. The single obtained five million Spotify streams within a year of its release; as of December 2020, the track boasted over twenty-five million streams.

After their record deal with Another Century Records, The Wrecks attempted to professionally record their sophomore EP in Los Angeles; however, discontent with its sound, the band abandoned the project to start from scratch. Having depleted their budget, Anderson and his band members attempted to fund their endeavors by participating in medical studies and working minimum wage jobs. The band temporarily moved into Anderson's grandmother's home in rural Wellsville, New York to record their next EP. Panic Vertigo was released on February 16, 2018.

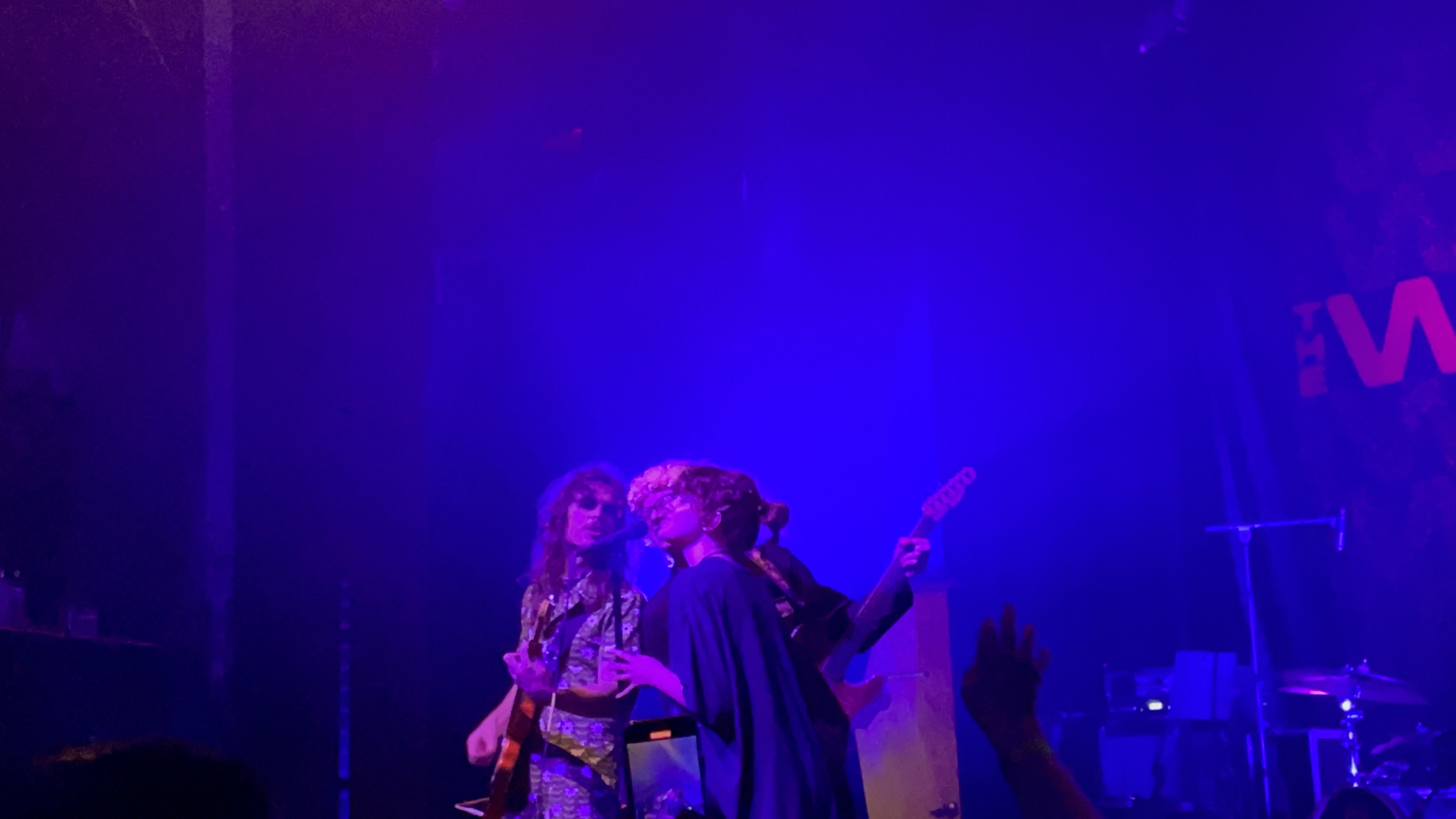
The Wrecks at the Gothic Theatre touring for their album Sonder, 2022 From left to right: Mothé (touring member of the Wrecks), Nick Anderson (lead singer for the Wrecks), & Lauren Luiz of girlhouse

The Wrecks' debut album, Infinitely Ordinary, was released on May 1, 2020. On December 18, 2020, The Wrecks released their third EP, Static. Then, on June 10, 2022, they released their second full length album called Sonder. They are touring this album nationally in 2022, ending in November 2022 in Ventura county (home to the city of Thousand Oaks).

=== Other projects ===
In May 2018, Anderson performed an untitled song on Episode No. 39 of Beyond the Pine. On the podcast, he made it clear that it was written independently from The Wrecks. Sometime later, Anderson gave the song to country band The Roads Below, who are also managed by War Road Music. Their version was released in June 2020.

In August 2019, Hoodie Allen's song "You Should Let Me Know" was released, with lyrics, production, and vocals contributed by Anderson, and guitar supplied by fellow Wrecks guitarist Schmidt. On March 25, 2020, the band's frontman Anderson was featured alongside Hoodie on an MTV Instagram livestream during which he teased The Wrecks' upcoming album. During the same livestream, it was revealed that Anderson produced all of the song's on Hoodie's fifth album.

In August 2020, it was reported that Anderson was a producer and co-writer for the band Fox Royale.

On November 13, 2020, coinciding with Good Boy Daisy's debut single "Grey", Anderson announced his partnership with the band as their producer. In the following year, The Wrecks would feature on the Good Boy Daisy's single "Never Learn" and produce their third single "Summer Rain." Anderson also went on to co-write and produce "Worlds Apart" and "It Can't Be That Hard", the latter of which was the final collaboration between Anderson and Good Boy Daisy. Good Boy Daisy continued on releasing music, just with Anderson no longer serving as their sole producer and co-writer.

In 2022, Anderson was announced as the co-writer and producer for a string of Hoodie Allen singles, leading to him being announced as one of the main collaborator's for Allen's sixth studio album, bub.

== Personal life ==
Anderson often incorporates themes of depression and anxiety into his music, having dealt with them in high school. "Coming to terms with it is the most healthy thing you can do," he has said.

In 2016, Louis Tomlinson of One Direction viewed The Wrecks at the Silverlake Lounge.

In 2020, he was a guest speaker at the Los Angeles College of Music.

Anderson resided in Encino of San Fernando Valley with streamers Steven Suptic and Clayton "Cib" James of Sugar Pine 7 until 2021.

== Discography ==
=== Solo ===
- A Love for Tomorrow (EP) (2012)
- "Here (In Your Arms) x Robbers" mashup (2019)
- "Past Life" (with Scotty Sire and Toddy Smith of "The Vlog Squad") (2020)

=== The Warehouse Conspiracy ===
- "You'll Think of Me" (with Mario Rocchio) (2012)
- "Flashing Lights (Lets go Out)" (with Mario Rocchio) (2012)

=== Exit Plan ===
- Sorry About Last Night (2013)

=== Coastbound ===
- Wasting Your Breath (2015)
- "The Hills" (The Weeknd cover) (2015)

=== The Wrecks ===
- We Are The Wrecks (EP) (2016)
- Panic Vertigo (EP) (2018)
- Infinitely Ordinary (2020)
- Static (EP) (2020)
- Sonder (2022)
- Sonder Deluxe (2022)
- INSIDE (EP) (2025)
- OUTSIDE (EP) (2026)

=== With other artists ===
Select list of contributions
Year	Song	Artist	Album	Contribution	Ref.
2019	"You Should Let Me Know"	Hoodie Allen	Whatever USA	Production, co-written, vocals	
2019	"Wake Up"	Run River North	Monsters Calling Home, Vol. 2	Production	
2020	"Lonely Weather"	Run River North	Creatures in Your Head	Co-written	
2020	"Don't Call Me When You're Lonely"	Fox Royale	non-album single	Production, co-written	
2020	"Out Of My Hands"	Fox Royale	non-album single	Production, co-written	
2020	"Bloody Nose"	The Used	Heartwork	Co-written	
2020	"Cecilia"	Sugar Pine 7	non-album single	Production	
2020	"Should've Been Me"	The Roads Below	non-album single	Co-written	
2020	"Grey"	Good Boy Daisy	non-album single	Production, co-written, vocals	
2021	"Messed Up"	Little Hurt	Every Second	Co-written	
2021	"Left the Car Running"	WHALES•TALK	non-album single	Production, co-written	
2021	"Can't Be Love" (with The Wrecks)	WHALES•TALK	non-album single	Production, co-written, vocals	
2021	"Untouchable" (ft. Jacoby Shaddix)	Atreyu	Baptize	Co-written	
2021	"Lightning Strike"	Escape The Fate	Chemical Warfare	Co-written	
2021	"Never Learn" (with The Wrecks)	Good Boy Daisy	non-album single	Production, co-written, vocals	
2021	"Summer Rain"	Good Boy Daisy	non-album single	Production, co-written, vocals	
2021	"Worlds Apart"	Good Boy Daisy	non-album single	Production, co-written	
2021	"It Can't Be That Hard"	Good Boy Daisy	non-album single	Production, co-written	
2022	"Make This Better" (with Kellin Quinn)	Phangs	non-album single	Production, co-written	
2022	"Wouldn't That Be Nice"	Hoodie Allen	bub	Production, co-written	
2022	"Hey Ben" (with Games We Play)	Hoodie Allen	bub	Production, co-written	
2022	"FYF"	Sky Katz	non-album single	Production, co-written	
2023	"Fingers"	Jutes	Ladybug	Production, co-written (with Schmizz of The Wrecks)	
2023	"Happy Again"	Hoodie Allen	bub	Production, co-written	
2023	"Better Me"	Hoodie Allen	bub	Production, co-written	
2023	"Sabotage"	Hoodie Allen	bub	Production, co-written	
2023	"Alibi"	Hoodie Allen	bub	Production, co-written	
2023	"eraserface"	Hoodie Allen	bub	Production, co-written	
2023	"Day Job" (with The Wrecks)	Jayden Seeley	TBA	Production, co-written, vocals	

== Videography ==
=== Music videos ===
==== Other appearances ====
Title	Artist	Year	Note
"Overrated"	Coastbound	2015	Lyric video
"The Hills" (The Weeknd Cover)	Coastbound	2015	Music video
"Real Love"	Sugar Pine 7	2020	Music video
"Grey"	Good Boy Daisy	2020	Lyric video

=== Filmography ===
==== Television ====
Year	Title	Role
2014	Let's Make A Deal	Contestant

==== Web ====
Year	Title	Role	Notes
2018	All Night	Band	Episode: Sink or Swim
2018–2020	Sugar Pine 7	Himself	Skit: "Drama with The Wrecks"; Skit: "Here's why we might have to quit..." It is noteworthy that the short features "Rich Girl" as background music, which Anderson's band, The Wrecks, would cover two years later.; Beyond the Pine: #39, #88, #103, #112
2020	The Wrecks Mockumentary	Himself	Self-released mockumentary
