= The Wrecks =

American pop rock band

- Also known as: We Are The Wrecks
- Origin: Thousand Oaks, California, U.S.
- Genres: Alternative rock; pop punk; indie rock
- Years active: 2015–present
- Labels: Another Century; Big Noise; Lava Records
- Members: Nick Anderson; Nick Schmidt; Aaron Kelley
- Past members: Harrison Nussbaum; Westen Weiss; Billy Nally
- Website: wearethewrecks.com

The Wrecks are an American pop rock band based in Los Angeles, California. The band is currently made up of Nick Anderson, Nick "Schmizz" Schmidt, and Aaron Kelley. The group's first single "Favorite Liar," released in 2016, was an instant success. However, their following increased exponentially after their debut album Infinitely Ordinary, featuring single "Fvck Somebody," released in 2020.

== History ==
=== Formation, first label signing, We Are The Wrecks, and Panic Vertigo (2014–2018) ===
Nick Anderson met Aaron Kelley on Facebook around 2010 when he was fourteen-years-old. Remaining friends through 2014, Kelley introduced Anderson to recording industry executive Richard Reines, for whom Kelley had been interning at the time, and Anderson began writing and producing for the bands that Reines managed. In September 2014, Anderson and Kelley formed a pop-punk band, Coastbound, with three others. Coastbound continued performing at local music festivals in California throughout 2015; however, in September 2015, Aaron and Kelley announced their intentions to place the band on a hiatus to pursue a "new music endeavor with an indie rock project." Sometime in October 2015, Anderson's new project released a song, "Get 'Em Ready," which features in Episode 5 of CBS's Limitless.

In late 2015, Anderson and Kelley invited Billy Nally and Harrison Nussbaum to join their new project. Nally then enlisted Nick Schmidt, the two having attended school together in Manchester, New Jersey. The five had already been acquainted, their prior musical projects being managed by Reines and Anderson having written for the others' past projects. Additionally, Nally, Nussbaum, and Schmidt had performed in a band alongside musician Clay Borrell in the Official Stand Up Tour in mid-2015. Disregarding the spontaneity of the project, the three New Jersey natives drove to California to record music with Anderson and Kelley at the latter's request. All of the band members were in their early twenties and a majority hail from the east coast. Anderson is native to Upstate New York; Schmidt and Nally grew up by the Jersey Shore; founding member Nussbaum is also native to New Jersey; and Kelley is native to Wisconsin, having attended UW-Stout. None of the band members are originally from California.

The Wrecks had formally begun in Thousand Oaks, California, in mid-November 2015. Through a friend's housekeeping engagement, Anderson gained access to a professional home studio, albeit without the owner's permission, and the group self-recorded three tracks for an extended play in just three days, with roommate, sound engineer, and Coastbound collaborator Andrew D'Angelo serving as co-producer. The band performed at a series of small venues before self-releasing their debut EP, We Are The Wrecks, to the internet in April 2016. That summer and fall, the Wrecks opened for Nothing But Thieves. On December 22, 2016, the line-up signed with Another Century Records. Soon after, their debut single "Favorite Liar" received significant airplay and charted in the top forty on alternative radio. The single obtained five million Spotify streams within a year of its release; as of January 2025, the track boasted over fifty million streams.

Harrison Nussbaum played guitar in the original line-up from late 2015 to late 2016 until leaving the band, briefly making the Wrecks a four-piece. He was subsequently replaced by Pittsburgh native Westen Weiss – who had also lived in Germany and China – in early 2017.

After their record deal with Another Century Records, The Wrecks attempted to professionally record their sophomore EP in Los Angeles; however, discontent with its sound, the band abandoned the project to start from scratch. Having depleted their budget, they continued to fund their endeavors by participating in medical studies and working minimum wage jobs. The band temporarily moved into Anderson's grandmother's home in rural Wellsville, New York and finished their next EP, Panic Vertigo, at the barn studio of friend Patrick Barry. Throughout the process, D'Angelo continued to serve as the band's sound engineer and co-producer. The recording process took one and a half years, and much of it took place over the summer of 2017 during All Time Low's "Last Young Renegade Tour, of which the Wrecks opened for. Panic Vertigo was released on February 16, 2018, and is considered to have been a late release. "Way With Words," a track from the album, was co-written by Alex Gaskarth of All Time Low.

In mid-2018, the Wrecks made an appearance in Episode 6 of Hulu's series All Night performing their song "Favorite Liar." During the fall of 2018, the Wrecks was sponsored by Nerf, recording an original song using their products.

=== New label, Infinitely Ordinary, Static, and Sonder (2019–present) ===
On June 7, 2019, the Wrecks announced a new record deal with label Big Noise Music Group. Weiss is depicted leaving midway through the announcement, implying his withdrawal from the band to pursue a career in producing, once again making the Wrecks a four-piece ensemble. Weiss's departure was jokingly confirmed in August 2019 by a series of tweets from the band's Twitter account. On June 10, 2019, the Wrecks announced a new single, "Freaking Out," gifting people who pre-ordered the song with an original hot sauce, Wrecktum Wrecker™. In another announcement, the band marked the release of the single as the "beginning of a new era" for the Wrecks. The single was released on June 21, 2019 and spent twenty-three weeks in SiriusXMU's "Alt 18" chart. Shortly after, the Wrecks released singles "Out of Style" and "Fvck Somebody," which garnered further mainstream radio play. In August 2019, Hoodie Allen's song "You Should Let Me Know" was released, with lyrics, production, and vocals contributed by Anderson, and guitar supplied by Schmidt.

The Wrecks' debut album, Infinitely Ordinary, was released on May 1, 2020. Infinitely Ordinary took roughly two years of refining, and unlike their previous EPs, the album features an array of producers and collaborators, including Daniel Chae of Run River North. A track from the album, "We All Get Lonely" (featuring TOMI), appears on the NHL 21 soundtrack.

On December 18, 2020, the Wrecks released their third EP, Static. Originally planning to release a deluxe album, it was ultimately decided by the band to split the project into two extended plays, Static being the first of the two. The band revealed on their Twitter account that the second EP will be released in 2021. In 2021, the band announced their intent to release a plethora of new music throughout the year. After their "Rich Girl" cover and their feature on Good Boy Daisy's "Never Learn," the Wrecks released their first new original single since Infinitely Ordinary on March 10, 2021. "I Want My Life Back Now" premiered exclusively on Alt Nation and was released on streaming platforms two days later.

The Wrecks released a new single, "Lone Survivor," on February 11, 2022. They released an accompanying music video for the song in March. On March 24, they released another new single, titled "I Love This Part," before a third single, "Where Are You Now?".

Writing for their sophomore album Sonder commenced immediately after Infinitely Ordinary. Their previous rhythm guitarist, Westen Weiss returned to assist with production. Additionally, Anderson has said that the album production was scattered, with much of it being produced in isolation due to the pandemic. Touring rhythm guitarist Fort has writing and production credits on the song "Don't Be Scared." The Wrecks released Sonder on June 10, 2022. An exclusive release party was held in Los Angeles. The deluxe version of Sonder released on November 4, 2022. It features two remixes, two acoustic reimaginings, and three brand new songs, including "Things You Make Me Do," which was released on September 30, 2022. The Wrecks released a limited run orange nail polish line named after their sophomore album in October 2022.

On October 4, 2024, the band released the single "Always, Everytime" from their upcoming third studio album. On March 7, 2025, they also released the single "Speed" from their upcoming album. On April 11, 2025, the Wrecks released INSIDE:, the first half of their third studio album under Republic Records.

The band was then dropped by Republic Records before they could release the rest of the album, titled OUTSIDE. The band continued to release the music without their label. On May 1, 2026, the band released the single "Mint Tobacco". They then released "Hangin' Out", another single, on July 31, 2026. The full album OUTSIDE was released on September 25, 2026.

On October 1, 2026, the band announced that they were parting ways with drummer Billy Nally.

== Concert tours ==
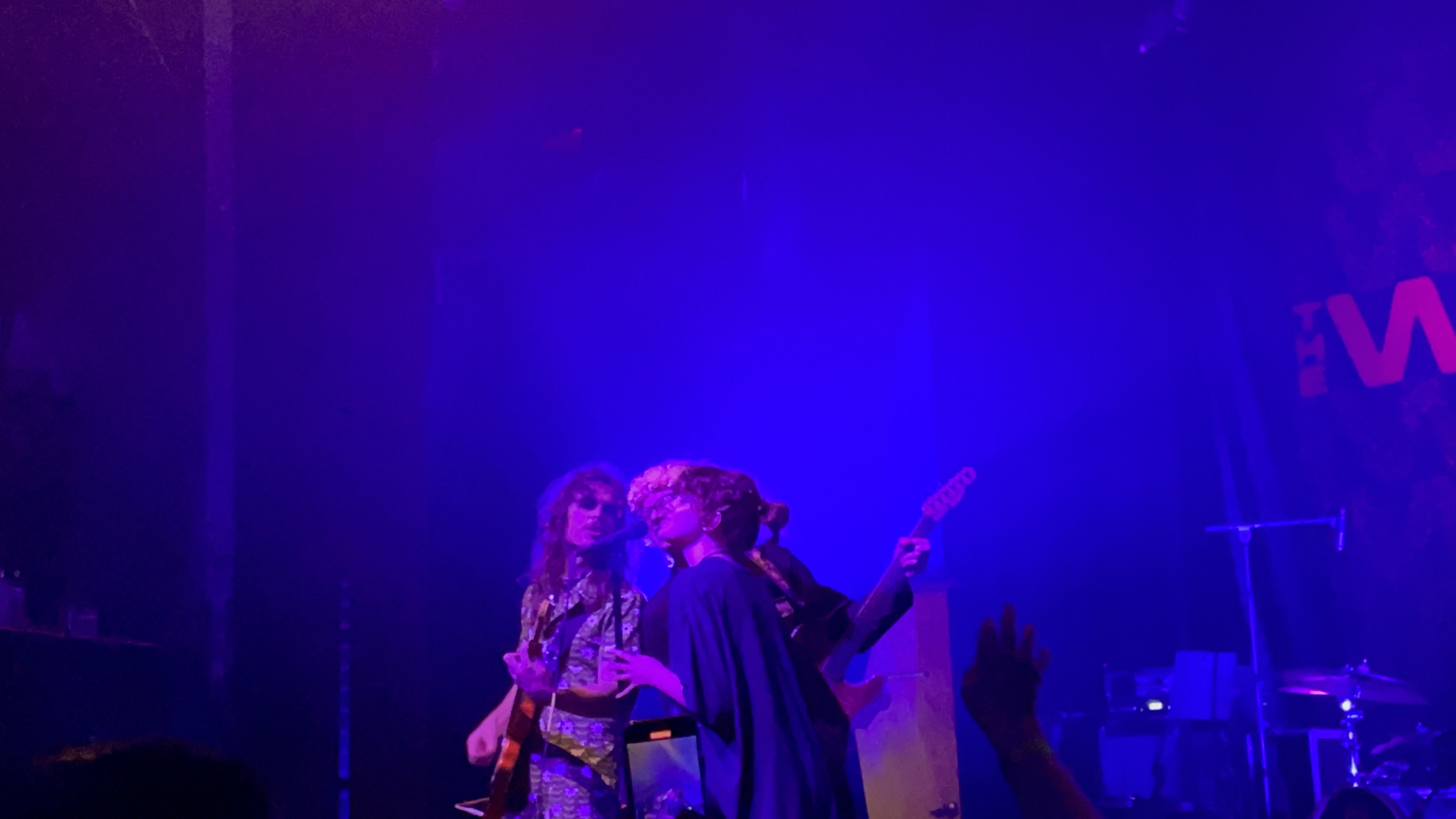
The Wrecks at the Gothic Theatre touring for their album Sonder, 2022 From left to right: Mothé (touring member of the Wrecks), Nick Anderson (lead singer for the Wrecks), & Lauren Luiz of girlhouse

The Wrecks have toured with bands such as All Time Low, SWMRS, Waterparks, The Hunna, and the Struts. Much of their participation with these bands fell under the Advanced Placement Tour in the fall of 2017. Additionally, the Wrecks have opened for Nothing But Thieves, as well as Paramore and Dashboard Confessional on nationwide tours. After opening for All Time Low's "Last Young Renegade Tour," the Wrecks embarked on their first headlining tour, the Robot Army Tour, in November 2017, alongside Mainland amongst other bands.

In March and April 2018, the Wrecks joined The Maine on the "Fry Your Brain with The Maine Tour." Thereafter, the Wrecks joined New Politics and Dreamers on the "Lost in Translation Tour" in April. In the summer of 2018, the Wrecks performed at the Bunbury Music Festival, BottleRock Napa Valley, and Lollapalooza. In November 2018, the band headlined their second tour, the Panic Vertigo Tour, alongside Badflower and Deal Casino.

In December 2019, the Wrecks supported Silversun Pickups alongside the Unlikely Candidates. On account of the COVID-19 pandemic, the band had to abstain from in person performances for the remainder of 2020, instead streaming exclusive live concerts throughout the fall. This included their "Live at the Shag Chateau" concerts in August, and their "The Nightmare Before Wrecksmas" Halloween concerts in October, both featuring Spencer Fort as an official touring member. In the spring of 2020, the Wrecks participated in the Block by Blockwest virtual music festival hosted through sandbox video game Minecraft. The COVID-19 pandemic also led to the postponing of a Driver Era tour, which the Wrecks were set to open for in 2020 and 2021.

The Wrecks assembled for their first live performance since the onset of COVID-19 at Jam in the Van Headquarters in Los Angeles, California on March 29, 2021. They were joined by touring member Fort. In late 2021, the Girlfriend Tour resumed and the Wrecks opened for the Driver Era.

In June 2022 they kicked off their headlining Better Than Ever Tour, featuring touring member Spencer Fort (Mothé), as well as Girlhouse. The tour lasted from June 9, 2022, and to July 23, 2022. Anderson has stated that the tour cycle will revolve around two records, since the first one was released during the COVID-19 pandemic. On July 25, they announced the second leg of their tour, the Back & Better Than Ever Tour. The tour kicked off on October 9 in Sonoma, CA at the Sonoma Harvest Festival and ended on November 19 in Ventura, CA. The tour featured CARR (October 11-October 25) and Arlie (October 27-November 19). The Wrecks also played 3 festival shows in 2023, being Bottlerock in Napa Valley, California in May, Riot Fest in Chicago, Illinois, in September and When We Were Young Fest in Las Vegas, Nevada in October.

In 2023, The Wrecks introduced a new annual touring concept entitled "The Los Angeles Half Marathon" which featured 3 shows spanning 13.1 miles across Los Angeles at legendary club venues, the Moroccan Lounge, the Echo, and the Troubadour. In 2024, The Wrecks rebranded the tour as the Super Half Marathon, spanning 5 cities across the United States. The Wrecks took their tour to club venues in Boston, Brooklyn, Chicago, Denver, and Los Angeles. The tour dates sold out on the same day of release.

In 2024 The Wrecks also announced their 2025 North American "the Inside:Outside tour", set to begin in April 2025. The tour spans 31 cities and 2 countries, featuring the band's first international dates in over 5 years.

Headlining

- Robot Army Tour (2017)
- Panic Vertigo Tour (2018)
- Wrecks Coast Tour (2021)
- Better Than Ever Tour (2022)
- Back & Better Than Ever Tour (2022)
- Los Angeles Half Marathon 2023 (2023)
- Super Half Marathon (2024)
- Inside:Outside Tour (2025)
- Inside:Outside Tour (Continued) (2025)

Opening

- Advanced Placement Tour (2017)
- Last Young Renegade Tour (2017)
- Fry Your Brain with The Maine Tour (2018)
- Lost in Translation Tour (2018)
- Girlfriend Tour (2021)

== Artistry ==
In regards to their band name, Anderson has stated, "Someone just said it one day. Coming up with a band name sucks." On another occasion, Anderson has joked about the band name stemming from a traffic accident the band members were in:

[We were involved in a] five car pile-up on the north-eastern shore of New Jersey... in the middle of Route 9... turns out, none of us had insurance on our vehicles, so we decided to start a band, name it 'The Wrecks,' and use the money we make to pay for our excessive mechanic bills.

The Wrecks often utilize the namesake of their first EP, We Are The Wrecks, as a social media handle – namely on Twitter, Instagram, and for their website.

When asked about the robot that appears on promotional imagery and merchandise, Anderson said, "The We Are The Wrecks EP cover features a robot. His name is Otis. He's basically become the band mascot." Additionally, he said, "The identity of the robot is currently a secret... [that will] unravel eventually." The robot iconography is also featured in the "Favorite Liar" music video and was the namesake of the Wrecks' first tour, the "Robot Army Tour."

The band's lyrics are primarily written by Anderson with an occasional assist from Schmidt. "[Schmizz has] more of a rock brain... I’ve got more of a pop nature," Anderson has noted. Their songs are produced using Pro Tools. The band has also acknowledged the DIY – "low budget, high effort" – attributes of their song production and music videos. Even so, the band has denounced the practice of quickly recording songs and uploading them to Bandcamp, instead opting to "[spend] months trying and failing to perfect a mix."

=== Musical style ===
Before the release of Panic Vertigo, Anderson labeled the Wrecks an alternative rock band, saying, "I think 'alternative rock' is a really good bubble for us to be in because that allows you to go any which way." While Anderson has also described the Wrecks as a rock band, he has acknowledged the versatility of the band's musical style, making it difficult to allot them to a specific genre. With the release of Infinitely Ordinary, the Wrecks ultimately transcended a confinement to any specific genre.

The Wrecks draw influence from the likes of the Pixies, the Strokes, Weezer, and Vampire Weekend. The Killers and Cage the Elephant have also been cited. Their music has also been described as "energetic" and "eccentric," as well as "alternative rock" and "pop-punk." In 2018, Ones to Watch referred to the band as "indie rock's best-kept secret." The Wrecks are also known to have scrapped a nearly complete "radio-friendly" version of their sophomore EP, Panic Vertigo, for a more "rock and roll" approach. In more recent projects, the band has seen a transition to a pop, pop rock, and electropop sound. This includes the incorporatation of lo-fi elements into their music, as seen in Infinitely Ordinary, Static, and Sonder. These projects were heavily influenced by Grouplove, as well as New Order and Pulp.

In 2022, their Sonder material was described as combining "rock" and "dream pop", and being "frantic genre-bending alt-rock."

== Band members ==
Current members

- Nicholas "Nick" Anderson – lead vocals, rhythm guitar, keyboard, producing (2015–present)
- Nicholas "Schmizz" Schmidt – lead guitar, backing vocals (2015–present)
- Aaron Kelley – bass guitar (2015–present)

Past members

- Harrison Dean Nussbaum – rhythm guitar (2015-2016)
- Westen Broek Weiss – rhythm guitar, keyboard (2017-2019)
- William "Billy" Nally – drums (2015–2026)

Touring members

- Mothé – rhythm guitar (2020-2022)

== Discography ==
=== Albums ===
List of albums
Title	Album details
Infinitely Ordinary	Released: May 1, 2020; Label: Big Noise Music Group; Format: Digital download, CD, vinyl
Sonder	Released: June 10, 2022; Deluxe release: November 4, 2022; Label: Big Noise Music Group; Format: Digital download, CD, vinyl

=== Extended plays ===
List of extended plays
Title	EP details
We Are The Wrecks	Released: April 29, 2016; Label: Self-released; Formats: Digital download, CD
Panic Vertigo	Released: February 16, 2018; Label: Another Century Records; Formats: Digital download, CD, vinyl
Static	Released: December 18, 2020; Label: Big Noise Music Group; Formats: Digital download

=== Live albums ===
List of live albums
Title	Album details
Jam in the Van - The Wrecks (Live Session, Los Angeles, CA, 2016)	Released: September 16, 2016; Label: Jam in the Van; Formats: Digital download
Jam in the Van - The Wrecks (Live Session, Los Angeles, CA, 2021)	Released: April 21, 2021; Label: Jam in the Van; Formats: Digital download

=== Singles ===
Song title	Release date	Album
"Favorite Liar"	March 23, 2016	We Are The Wrecks
"James Dean"	February 16, 2018	Panic Vertigo
"Freaking Out"	June 21, 2019	Infinitely Ordinary
"Fvck Somebody"	December 6, 2019	Infinitely Ordinary
"Out Of Style"	March 20, 2020	Infinitely Ordinary
"Psycho Killer" (Talking Heads cover)	October 30, 2020	Non-album single
"Rich Girl" (Hall & Oates cover)	January 15, 2021	Non-album single
"I Want My Life Back Now"	March 10, 2021	Non-album single
"Lone Survivor"	February 11, 2022	Sonder
"I Love This Part"	March 25, 2022	Sonder
"Where Are You Now?" (feat. girlhouse)	May 9, 2022	Sonder
"Things You Make Me Do"	September 30, 2022	Sonder (Deluxe Version)
"Always, Everytime"	October 4, 2024	(Upcoming third studio album)

=== As featured artist ===
Title	Release Date	Album
"Never Learn" (Good Boy Daisy feat. The Wrecks)	January 22, 2021	Non-album single
"Can't Be Love" (WHALES•TALK feat. The Wrecks)	April 15, 2021	Non-album single
"Day Job" (Jayden Seeley feat. The Wrecks)	September 26, 2023	Non-album single

=== Unreleased ===
Unreleased music recorded or performed by the Wrecks
Year	Song	Studio/Live	Notes	Ref.
2015	"Get 'Em Ready"	Studio	Features in Episode 5 of CBS's Limitless.	
2016	"Wasted Youth"	Studio	Performed at the 2018 Bunbury Music Festival., while a studio version has also been leaked.	
2018	"Right Back Where I Started"	Studio	Featured in an episode of Sugar Pine 7, a studio version has also been leaked.	
2018	"Life"	Live	Performed at the 2018 Bunbury Music Festival.	
2018	"Rely"	Live	Throughout November 2018, the Wrecks performed new song "Rely" at several concerts; however, the song remains unreleased.	
2018	"You Should See Me in a Crown" (Billie Eilish cover)	Studio	The Wrecks shared a full studio cover of "You Should See Me In A Crown" on their Twitter account, but it remains unreleased on other platforms.	
2018	"Talk About It" (Demo)	Studio	The band shared a portion of the demo on their Instagram story. The full version, purportedly on their SoundCloud account, is private. The song would eventually bear an entirely different chorus and title, "Panic Vertigo," and appear on the Wrecks' sophomore EP of the same name.	
2019	"Fvck Somebody" (Demo)	Studio	The band shared the full demo of this song to users who signed up for their Community service. The song originally featured an alternate bridge and noticeable production differences. "Fvck Somebody" became one of the band's most successful songs and features on their debut album, Infinitely Ordinary.	

== Filmography ==
=== Music videos ===
List of music videos, showing year released and directors
Title	Year	Director(s)	Ref.
"Favorite Liar (Official Killer Robot Edition)"	2017	Caleb Spillyards	
"Favorite Liar"	2017	Uncredited	
"Nerf Nightmare"	2018	The Wrecks	
"James Dean"	2018	Hunter Garrett	
"Freaking Out"	2019	The Wrecks	
"Fvck Somebody"	2020	Nick Anderson	
"Out of Style"	2020	Chris Grieder	
"Static"	2021	Nick Anderson	
"I Want My Life Back Now"	2021	Marielle Boland	
"Lone Survivor"	2022	Genevieve Andrew	
"I Love This Part"	2022	Daniel Henry	
"Sonder"	2022	Cloudy Thoughts	
"Things You Make Me Do"	2022	Cloudy Thoughts	

|- ! scope="row"| "Normal (Acoustic)" | |- |}

=== Web ===
Year	Title	Role	Notes	Reference
2018	All Night	Band	Episode: Sink or Swim	
2018-2019	Sugar Pine 7	Themselves	Skit: "Drama with The Wrecks"	
2020	The Wrecks Mockumentary	Themselves	Self-released mockumentary	
