= 2019 iHeartRadio Music Awards =

American music awards

- Date: March 14, 2019
- Location: Microsoft Theater, Los Angeles
- Country: United States
- Hosted by: T-Pain
- Most awards: Ariana Grande & Ella Mai (3 each)
- Most nominations: Cardi B (14)

Television/radio coverage
- Network: Fox

The 2019 iHeartRadio Music Awards was held at Microsoft Theater in Los Angeles on March 14, 2019, and was broadcast live on Fox. Ariana Grande and Ella Mai were the most awarded artists, each winning three iHeartRadio Music Awards on the night. Cardi B led the list of nominees with 14 nominations, followed by Drake with eight. T-Pain, who won The Masked Singer, hosted the show.

== Performances ==
Performer(s)	Song title
Halsey; Travis Barker; Yungblud	"Without Me" "11 Minutes"
Kacey Musgraves; Chris Martin	"Rainbow"
Marshmello; Lauv	"Happier" "I'm So Tired..."
Lovelytheband	"Broken"
Ella Mai	"Trip"
John Legend	"Preach"
Backstreet Boys	"No Place" "I Want It That Way"
Alicia Keys	"Raise a Man" "You Don't Know My Name"
Ariana Grande	"Needy" (pre-recorded)
Garth Brooks	Medley: "Callin Baton Rouge" "Ask Me How I Know" "The Thunder Rolls" "Friends in Low Places"

== Winners and nominees ==
The nominations were announced on January 9, 2019. Nominations for Best Fan Army were announced on January 23.

Winners are shown in Boldtype.

Song of the Year	Female Artist of the Year
"The Middle" – Zedd, Maren Morris and Grey; "Better Now" – Post Malone; "Girls Like You" – Maroon 5 featuring Cardi B; "God's Plan"– Drake; "Perfect" – Ed Sheeran	Ariana Grande; Camila Cabello; Cardi B; Dua Lipa; Halsey
Male Artist of the Year	Best Duo/Group of the Year
Drake; Ed Sheeran; Kendrick Lamar; Post Malone; Shawn Mendes	5 Seconds of Summer; Imagine Dragons; Maroon 5; Panic! at the Disco; Twenty One Pilots
Album of the Year (per genre)	Best Collaboration
Pop: Sweetener – Ariana Grande; Rock: Trench – Twenty One Pilots; Country: Rearview Town – Jason Aldean; Dance: Sick Boy – The Chainsmokers; R&B: My Dear Melancholy - The Weeknd; Alternative Rock: Pray for the Wicked – Panic! at the Disco; Latin: Vibras – J Balvin	"Finesse" – Bruno Mars featuring Cardi B; "Meant to Be" – Bebe Rexha and Florida Georgia Line; "I Like It" – Cardi B, Bad Bunny and J Balvin; "Girls Like You" – Maroon 5 featuring Cardi B; "The Middle" – Zedd, Maren Morris and Grey
Best New Pop Artist	Alternative Rock Song of the Year
Marshmello; Bazzi; Lauv; Max Schneider; NF	"High Hopes" – Panic! at the Disco; "Natural" – Imagine Dragons; "Broken" – Lovelytheband; "Happier" – Marshmello and Bastille; "Africa" – Weezer
Alternative Rock Artist of the Year	Best New Rock/Alternative Artist
Imagine Dragons; Lovelytheband; Panic! at the Disco; Portugal. The Man; Thirty Seconds to Mars	Lovelytheband; AJR; Badflower; Billie Eilish; Two Feet
Rock Song of the Year	Rock Artist of the Year
"Safari Song" – Greta Van Fleet; "Zombie" – Bad Wolves; "Are You Ready" – Disturbed; "Bulletproof" – Godsmack; "Devil" – Shinedown	Three Days Grace; Five Finger Death Punch; Godsmack; Greta Van Fleet; Shinedown
Country Song of the Year	Country Artist of the Year
"Meant to Be" – Bebe Rexha and Florida Georgia Line; "Tequila" – Dan + Shay; "Heaven" – Kane Brown; "Most People Are Good" – Luke Bryan; "Rich" – Maren Morris	Luke Combs; Carrie Underwood; Jason Aldean; Luke Bryan; Thomas Rhett
Best New Country Artist	Dance Song of the Year
Jordan Davis; Carly Pearce; Dylan Scott; Lanco; Russell Dickerson	"The Middle" – Zedd, Maren Morris and Grey; "One Kiss" – Calvin Harris and Dua Lipa; "Remind Me to Forget" – Kygo featuring Miguel; "Friends" – Marshmello and Anne-Marie; "Happier" – Marshmello and Bastille
Dance Artist of the Year	Hip-Hop Song of the Year
Marshmello; Calvin Harris; The Chainsmokers; Kygo; Zedd	"God's Plan" – Drake; "I Like It" – Cardi B, Bad Bunny and J Balvin; "In My Feelings" – Drake; "Nice for What" – Drake; "Psycho" – Post Malone featuring Ty Dolla Sign
Hip-Hop Artist of the Year	Best New Hip-Hop Artist
Cardi B; Drake; Kendrick Lamar; Post Malone; Travis Scott	BlocBoy JB; Juice Wrld; Lil Baby; Lil Pump; XXXTentacion
R&B Song of the Year	R&B Artist of the Year
"Boo'd Up" – Ella Mai; "Finesse" – Bruno Mars featuring Cardi B; "Sky Walker" – Miguel featuring Travis Scott; "Medicine" – Queen Naija; "When We" – Tank	Ella Mai; Daniel Caesar; H.E.R.; Miguel; SZA
Best New R&B Artist	Latin Song of the Year
Ella Mai; Brent Faiyaz; H.E.R.; Queen Naija; TK Kravit	"X" – Nicky Jam and J Balvin; "Dura" – Daddy Yankee; "Échame la Culpa" – Luis Fonsi and Demi Lovato; "Me niego" – Reik featuring Ozuna and Wisin; "Clandestino" – Shakira and Maluma
Latin Artist of the Year	Best New Latin Artist
Bad Bunny; Daddy Yankee; J Balvin; Maluma; Ozuna	Manuel Turizo; Lele Pons; Mau y Ricky; Nio Garcia; Raymix
Regional Mexican Song of the Year	Regional Mexican Artist of the Year
"Mitad Y Mitad" – Calibre 50; "Mejor Me Alejo" – Banda MS; "Mi Sorpresa Fuiste Tu" – Calibre 50; "Me Deje Llevar" – Christian Nodal; "Entre Beso Y Beso" – La Arrolladora Banda El Limón	Calibre 50; Banda Carnaval; Banda MS; Christian Nodal; Gerardo Ortiz
Producer of the Year	Songwriter of the Year
Louis Bell; 40; David Garcia; Frank Dukes; Marshmello	Frank Dukes; Andrew Watt; Louis Bell; Max Martin; Sarah Aarons
Best Fan Army (support by Taco Bell)	Best Lyrics
BTS – BTSArmy; 5 Seconds of Summer – 55OSFam; Ariana Grande – Arianators; Camila Cabello – Camilizers; Cardi B – BardiGang; Harry Styles – Stylers; Justin Bieber – Beliebers; Lauren Jauregui – Jaguars; Shawn Mendes – MendesArmy; Taylor Swift – Swifties; Why Don't We – Limelights; Zayn Malik – Zquad	Camila Cabello – "Consequences"; Ariana Grande – "Thank U, Next"; Drake – "God's Plan"; Halsey – "Without Me"; Maroon 5 featuring Cardi B – "Girls Like You"; Shawn Mendes – "In My Blood"
Best Cover Song	Best Music Video
"You're Still the One" (Shania Twain) – Harry Styles and Kacey Musgraves; "(You Make Me Feel Like) A Natural Woman" (Aretha Franklin) – Ariana Grande; "In My Blood" (Shawn Mendes) – Charlie Puth; "Lucid Dreams" (Juice Wrld) – Halsey; "Rewrite the Stars" (Zac Efron and Zendaya) – James Arthur and Anne-Marie; "Fast Car" (Tracy Chapman) – Khalid; "Your Song" (Elton John) – Lady Gaga; "Crying in the Club" (Camila Cabello) – Niall Horan; "A Million Dreams" (Ziv Zaifman, Hugh Jackman and Michelle Williams) – Pink; "Under Pressure" (Queen and David Bowie) – Shawn Mendes and Teddy Geiger; "Africa" (Toto) – Weezer; "Me, Myself and I" (Beyoncé) – Zayn	"Delicate" – Taylor Swift; "Thank U, Next" – Ariana Grande; "Finesse" – Bruno Mars featuring Cardi B; "One Kiss" – Calvin Harris and Dua Lipa; "I Like It" – Cardi B, Bad Bunny and J Balvin; "This Is America" – Childish Gambino; "Dura" – Daddy Yankee; "God's Plan" – Drake; "Freaky Friday" – Lil Dicky featuring Chris Brown; "Girls Like You" – Maroon 5 featuring Cardi B; "Psycho" – Post Malone featuring Ty Dolla Sign; "Taki Taki" – DJ Snake featuring Selena Gomez, Ozuna and Cardi B
Social Star Award	Cutest Musician's Pet
Agnez Mo; Danielle Bregoli; Dylan Minnette; Joji; Lele Pons; Loren Gray; Mason Ramsey; Queen Naija; Tana Mongeau; Trixie Mattel	Gracie – Lauren Jauregui; Mooshu – Alex Pall; Piggy Smallz – Ariana Grande; Edgar – Brett Eldredge; Asia – Lady Gaga; Hatchi – Perrie Edwards; Goodwin – Sabrina Carpenter
Best Solo Breakout	Song That Left Us Shook
Tiffany Young – Girls' Generation; Ally Brooke – Fifth Harmony; Dinah Jane – Fifth Harmony; Lauren Jauregui – Fifth Harmony; Normani – Fifth Harmony	"I'll Never Love Again" – Lady Gaga; "Thank U, Next" – Ariana Grande; "This Is America" – Childish Gambino; "Here Comes the Change" – Kesha; "One Day" – Logic featuring Ryan Tedder; "Youth" – Shawn Mendes featuring Khalid
Favorite Tour Photographer	Tour of the Year
Helene Pambrum – Harry Styles; Andy DeLuca – 5 Seconds of Summer; Christian Tierney – Niall Horan; Josiah Van Dien – Shawn Mendes; Pixie Levinson – Dua Lipa; Rahul B – Camila Cabello; Ravie B – Beyoncé; Zack Caspary – Why Don't We	Taylor Swift – Reputation Stadium Tour
Most Thumbed-Up Artist of the Year	iHeartRadio Innovator Award
Imagine Dragons	Alicia Keys
Artist of the Decade	L'Oréal Fangirls Award
Garth Brooks	Halsey
Artist of the Year
Ariana Grande
