= These Are My Friends =

Single by Lovelytheband

from the album Finding It Hard to Smile
- Released: May 11, 2018
- Genre: Synth-pop; indie pop
- Length: 3:28
- Label: Another Century; Century Media; RED
- Producer: Christian Medice

Lovelytheband singles chronology
"Broken" (2017)	"These Are My Friends" (2018)	"Maybe, I'm Afraid" (2019)

Music video
- "these are my friends" on YouTube

"These Are My Friends" (stylized in all lowercase) is a song by the American indie pop band Lovelytheband. The song was released as the band's second single on May 11, 2018.

== Background ==
Upon the single's May 2018 release, lead vocalist Mitchy Collins described the song's meaning, saying, "This is a song about all of the people in my life as well as the good and bad that lives inside me...Because whether or not I get along with them all the time, I love them. They make me who I am. I have to embrace all, if I didn't I wouldn't be me."

== Music video ==
The single's official music video, directed by Hoeg/Beach, was released on July 13, 2018, via Red Music.

== Reception ==
The independent music blog frtyfve, which highlighted the song as its "track of the day", described the single as "a powerful ode to friendship and battling through the hard times with the right people. With an incredible catchy singalong chorus, it is likely that the single will compete with "broken" in streaming figure terms."

== Charts ==
Chart (2018–19)	Peak position
US Hot Rock Songs (Billboard)	20
US Rock Airplay (Billboard)	11
