= Finding It Hard to Smile =

Studio album by Lovelytheband
- Released: August 3, 2018
- Genre: Indie pop; pop rock; synth-pop; indie rock
- Length: 53:46
- Label: Another Century

Lovelytheband chronology
Everything I Could Never Say... (2017)	Finding It Hard to Smile (2018)	Conversations with Myself About You (2020)

Singles from Finding It Hard to Smile
- 1. "Broken" Released: April 13, 2017; 2. "These Are My Friends" Released: May 11, 2018; 3. "Maybe, I'm Afraid" Released: March 2019

Finding It Hard to Smile (stylized in all lowercase) is the debut studio album by American indie pop band Lovelytheband, released on August 3, 2018. The album was announced on June 29, 2018, along with the release of the track "Alone Time".

Prior to its release, the band had gained a reputation through their opening performances for several bands, including Awolnation and 5 Seconds of Summer. After said tours, they ventured on a festival tour throughout the summer of 2018. The album was promoted with two singles: "Broken" and "These Are My Friends", as well as two promotional singles: "Alone Time" and "Pity Party".

The tracklist includes the songs released on the band's debut EP, Everything I Could Never Say..., excluding "Strangers" and "Don't Worry, You Will".

== Track listing ==
Credits adapted from Tidal.

No.	Title	Writer(s)	Producer(s)	Length
1.	"Finding It Hard to Smile"	Mitchell Collins; Christian Medice	Christian Medice	1:18
2.	"Pity Party"	Medice; Collins	Christian Medice	3:10
3.	"Make You Feel Pretty"	Medice; Denis Lipari; Collins	Charlie Park; Christian Medice	3:50
4.	"Broken"	Samantha DeRosa; Collins; Medice	Christian Medice	3:24
5.	"Alone Time"	Jordan Greenwald; Medice; Collins	Christian Medice; Charlie Park	3:52
6.	"These Are My Friends"	Collins; Medice	Christian Medice	3:28
7.	"Coachella"	Collins; Medice; Greenwald	Charlie Park; Christian Medice	3:46
8.	"Filling a Void"	Medice; Collins	Christian Medice; Sam Price	1:10
9.	"Your Whatever"	Ryan McMahon; Lipari; Larz Principato; Ryan Rabin; Medice; Berger; Collins	Christian Medice	3:13
10.	"Maybe, I’m Afraid"	Medice; Jason Bell; Collins; Jordan Miller	Christian Medice	3:08
11.	"Emotion"	DeRosa; Collins; Medice	Christian Medice; Charlie Park	3:39
12.	"Walk from Here"	Greenwald; Samuel Price; Medice; Collins	Christian Medice	3:22
13.	"Stupid Mistakes"	Ariana Gavrilis; Medice; Collins	Christian Medice	3:54
14.	"Make Believe"	Gavrilis; Medice; Zac Barnett; Collins	Christian Medice	3:46
15.	"I Like the Way"	Dan Book; Medice; Collins	Dan Book; Christian Medice	3:00
16.	"Everything I Could Never Say... to You"	Greenwald; Price; Medice; Collins	Christian Medice	5:46
Total length:				53:46

- All tracks are stylized in lowercase letters.

== Charts ==
Chart performance for Finding It Hard To Smile

Chart (2018)	Peak position
US Billboard 200	168
