= Wellsville Raceway =

Defunct auto racing venue in Wellsville, New York

- Location: Wellsville, New York
- Coordinates: 42.1197°N 77.9282°W
- Operator: Bill Lydle
- Opened: 1950
- Closed: 1954
- Surface: Dirt
- Length: 1 km (0.62 mi)

Wellsville Raceway was a 5/8-mile (1.0 km) dirt oval racing facility located in the Chautauqua-Alleghany (or the western Southern Tier) Region of New York State.

== Overview ==
Wellsville Raceway was located on the former Wellsville Driving Park fairgrounds. A group of 10 investors formed the Wellsville Speedway, Inc. in 1950, and took possession of the old fairgrounds. The first auto race was held August 6, reportedly to a crowd of 4,500 spectators and sanctioned by the Atlantic Stock Car Racing Association.

The raceway was one of a series of venues in the Twin Tiers region of New York and Pennsylvania where drivers began their careers before becoming known on the state and national scene.

The racetrack shut down after the 1954 season, and the land was repurposed for what is now the Wellsville School complex.
