= Broken (Lovelytheband song) =

2017 single by lovelytheband

Single by Lovelytheband

from the album Finding It Hard to Smile
- Released: April 13, 2017 (Billboard); August 3, 2018 (digital download)
- Genre: Synth-pop; indie pop
- Length: 3:24
- Label: Another Century; Century Media; RED
- Songwriters: Mitchell Collins; Samantha Derosa; Christian Medice
- Producer: Christian Medice

Lovelytheband singles chronology
"Broken" (2017)	"These Are My Friends" (2018)

Music video
- "Broken" on YouTube

lovelytheband – "Broken"
A 20-second sample of the song.

"Broken" (stylized in all lowercase) is the debut single by the American indie pop band Lovelytheband, released exclusively to Billboard on April 13, 2017. The song was later included on the band's debut album, Finding It Hard to Smile (2018).

"Broken" was the band's breakout hit, reaching number 29 on the Billboard Hot 100 and spending nine weeks at number one on Billboard's Alternative Songs chart. The song held the record for longest running entry on the latter chart, at 76 weeks, eclipsing the 65 week run of "Savior" by Rise Against, until it was passed by the chart run of "Monsters" by All Time Low. In late 2023, Billboard ranked the song as the second most successful in the chart's history.

== Background ==
Vocalist Mitchy Collins described the background of the song saying: "We all have our demons we fight every day. It's about finding someone whose problems complement yours. Perfectly imperfect. Everyone is a little broken inside, trying to find their band aid". He also explained the song by saying "This song is about finding someone who is just as fucked up and lost as you are, but somehow you make it work together. Everyone is a little bit broken inside, nobody's perfect. This song is an ode to the broken ones". Collins wrote the song when he was undergoing a difficult point in his life, soon after he split with Danielle Bouchard in his former band Oh Honey and after a heartbreak.

== Song description ==
The song takes place in "some trust fund baby's Brooklyn loft". It describes a narrator who meets an unknown woman at a party, and both discover they are broken, which opens them up emotionally.

== Music video ==
The music video, released in September 2017, opens with Mitchy Collins saying: "Life is funny like that, when the dust settles at the end of the day–and we've said all we can, we'll realize every part of us, even the loving ones, were a little broken". The video shows Collins meeting a blonde woman (played by Skylar Benton) at a party and cuts away to fantasies in which he imagines his life with her.

== Critical reception ==
The song received positive reviews. Atwood magazine said, "For all its theatrics, lovely.the.band's debut satisfies an essential part of our complex emotional diet". Music Existence wrote, "'broken' is a bouncy, synth-pop dream of song that winds melancholy lyrics with an infectiously cheerful tune. The song has everything to make it a hit..." Stereogum described the song as a "chirpy tune about the prospect of love between two deeply damaged people. Replete with gang vocals, a rhythm fit for drunken swaying, and a keyboard riff that echoes back to MGMT's "Kids"..."

The song is featured in the season 4 preview video for television series ‘Catastrophe’ starring Rob Delaney and Sharon Horgan and the trailer for the 2020 horror film Come Play.

== Charts ==
=== Weekly charts ===
Chart (2018–2019)	Peak position
Canada (Canadian Hot 100)	18
Iceland (Tónlistinn)	6
Mexico (Billboard Ingles Airplay)	1
New Zealand Hot Singles (RMNZ)	9
US Billboard Hot 100	29
US Adult Contemporary (Billboard)	7
US Adult Top 40 (Billboard)	1
US Hot Rock Songs (Billboard)	2
US Mainstream Top 40 (Billboard)	14
US Rock Airplay (Billboard)	1

=== Year-end charts ===
Chart (2018)	Position
Iceland (Plötutíóindi)	67
US Adult Top 40 (Billboard)	15
US Radio Songs (Billboard)	45
US Hot Rock Songs (Billboard)	7
US Rock Airplay (Billboard)	1
Chart (2019)	Position
Canada (Canadian Hot 100)	89
US Adult Contemporary (Billboard)	20
US Adult Top 40 (Billboard)	24
US Hot Rock Songs (Billboard)	4

=== Decade-end charts ===
Chart (2010–2019)	Position
US Hot Rock Songs (Billboard)	26

== Certifications ==
Region	Certification	Certified units/sales
Canada (Music Canada)	2× Platinum	160,000^{‡}
New Zealand (RMNZ)	Platinum	30,000^{‡}
United Kingdom (BPI)	Silver	200,000^{‡}
United States (RIAA)	3× Platinum	3,000,000^{‡}
^{‡} Sales+streaming figures based on certification alone.
