= Finish Ticket =

American musical group

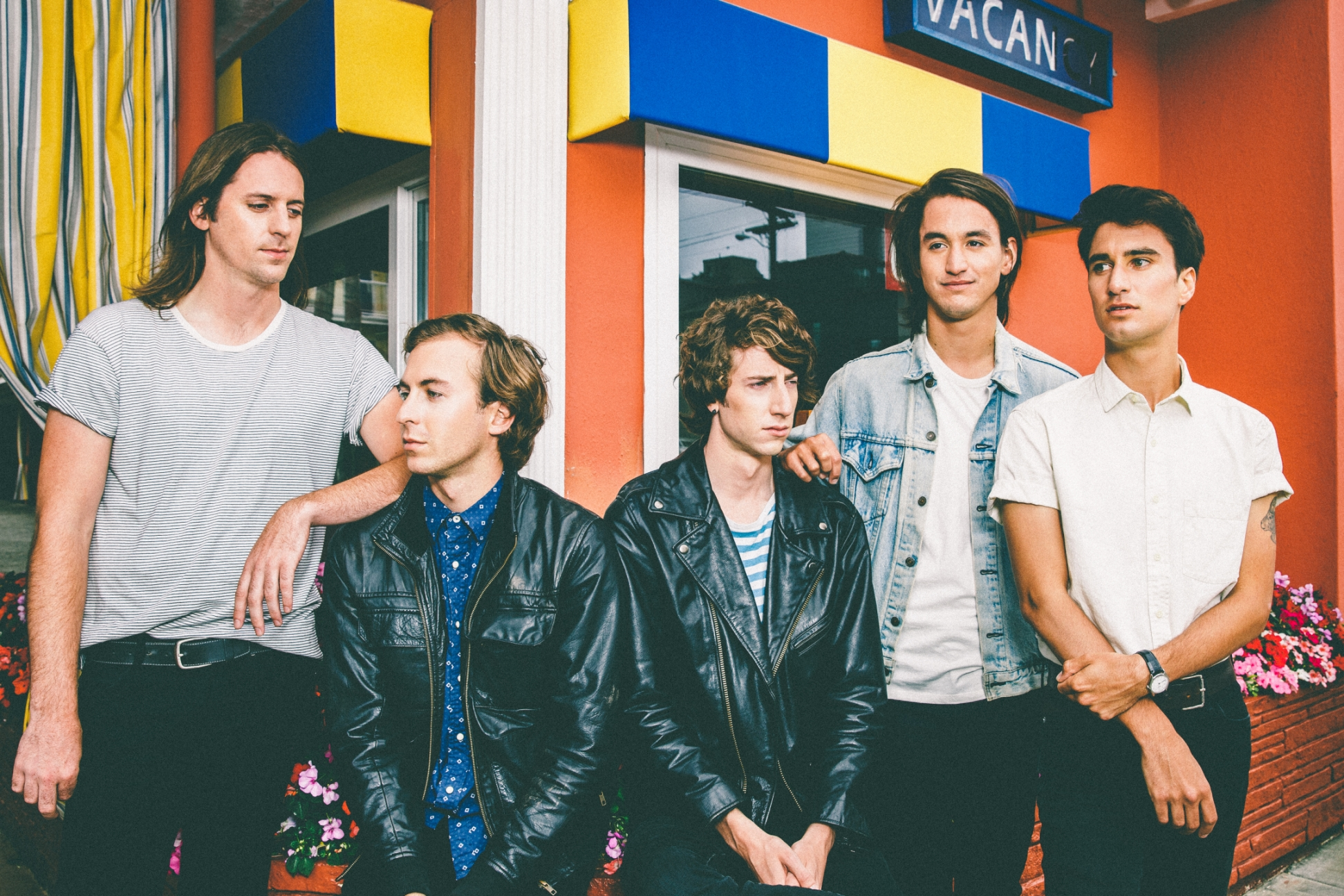

Background information
- Origin: Alameda, California, U.S.
- Genres: Indie pop, indie rock, alternative rock
- Years active: 2008–2026
- Labels: Better Noise Music, Elektra, Atlantic Records
- Past members: Brendan Hoye; Alex DiDonato; Gabe Stein; Ryan Blair; Chris Arellano; Garren Orr; Michael Hoye; Nick Stein
- Website: finishticket.com

Finish Ticket was an American musical group from Alameda, California. The members were Brendan Hoye (vocals), Alex DiDonato (guitar), Gabe Stein (drums) and Ryan Blair (bass). The band was a staple in the local San Francisco music scene, self-releasing two EPs and an album and playing at local venues and music festivals. They gathered national fame after signing to Elektra Records in 2014, releasing their debut EP with the label in 2015. They have toured both nationally in the United States and in Europe and have performed with artists such as Fall Out Boy, The Black Keys, Twenty One Pilots, Fitz and the Tantrums, AWOLNATION, and Ed Sheeran.

== History ==
Finish Ticket began when founding members and twin brothers Brendan and Michael Hoye were still attending Alameda High School. They started the group along with guitarist Alex DiDonato and were later joined by brothers Gabe and Nick Stein in 2012. Early in their career, the group performed at local festivals and headlined local venues. The group had a brief hiatus when the members went to college, reuniting after a year in order to pursue their careers in music.

Finish Ticket continued performing and opening for big names in one-off shows. They also self-released two EPs, Life Underwater in 2009 and Shake a Symphony in 2010. They followed up with a self-released album called Tears You Apart in 2013. They made the rounds at music festivals including playing at Outside Lands Music and Arts Festival and venues such as the Shoreline Amphitheater in Mountain View, California. The group's album Tears You Apart was picked up by Elektra Records who signed the group to a deal and re-released the album in 2014. They traveled to London to record their debut EP for the label which was released in 2015. Following recording, Finish Ticket toured Europe, performing shows in Germany, France, Austria, and Netherlands. They were also recognized as The Best of What's Next by Paste Magazine.

In 2015, Finish Ticket was the opening act for the national Blurryface Tour, headlined by Twenty One Pilots. They returned from the tour as the headliner for a show at the Great American Music Hall. In early 2016, the group embarked on the "Ones To Watch" tour with co-headliners, Vinyl Theatre. Beginning in September 2016, the group performed a headlining tour with the opening bands being Run River North and Irontom.

On November 9, 2018, Finish Ticket announced that Michael Hoye and Nick Stein had left the band, leaving Brendan Hoye, Alex DiDonato, and Gabe Stein as full time members. The latter three re-located to Los Angeles around the same time. In the same year, they also parted ways with their record label Elektra Records.

Finish Ticket made their return to the live stage in May 2019, announcing two shows in San Francisco and Los Angeles. They later announced a full length U.S tour that took place between September 8 to 28 of that same year. On June 27, 2019, the band announced their first new music since the release of When Night Becomes Day in 2015 with the track "Dream Song", which was released July 12. The songs "Ceiling Won't Break" and "Black Horse" were subsequently released in the following months.

In 2022 Finish Ticket announced that they were signed to Better Noise Records on Instagram. In spring of 2023, the band toured with Canadian band The Beaches. In July 2023 they opened for Arrows in Action with Honey Revenge; Finish Ticket also announced that they would be playing Lollapalooza 2023 in Chicago in August, 2023. A new single called "Changing" was released on July 21, 2023. On May 17, 2024, the band released the single, "Let You Go" and announced their sophomore record Echo Afternoon would be released on September 6, 2024 through Better Noise Records.

On September 23, 2026, Finish Ticket announced that they were disbanding. They played their final show on November 16, 2026.

== Discography ==
=== Studio albums ===
Title	Details
Tears You Apart	Released: 2013 (Twirl Tunez Records) / May 19, 2014 (Elektra Records); Label: Elektra Records; Format: CD / Digital download / LP
Echo Afternoon	Released: September 6, 2024; Label: Better Noise Records; Format: CD / Digital download / LP

=== Extended plays ===
Title	Details
Life Underwater	Released: September 4, 2009; Label: Self-released; Format: CD / Digital download
Shake a Symphony	Released: August 7, 2010; Label: Self-released; Format: CD / Digital download
When Night Becomes Day EP	Released: September 4, 2015; Label: Elektra Records; Format: CD / Digital download

=== Singles ===
Year	Title	Peak chart positions		Album
Year	Title	US Alt	US Rock Airplay	Album
2011	"New York"	—	—	Shake A Symphony
2013	"Take It Out"	—	—	Tears You Apart
2013	"Catch You On My Way Out"	—	—	Tears You Apart
2013	"In The Summer"	—	—	Tears You Apart
2014	"Tranquilize"	—	—	Tears You Apart
2015	"Wrong"	—	—	When Night Becomes Day EP
2016	"Color"	24	45	When Night Becomes Day EP
2019	"Dream Song"	—	—	Dream Song
2019	"Black Horse"			
2019	"Ceiling Won't Break"			
2020	"Timebomb"			
2023	"Changing"			Echo Afternoon
2024	"Let You Go"			Echo Afternoon
2024	"Peace of Mind"	—	—	Echo Afternoon
"—" denotes single that did not chart or was not released
