= Arrows in Action =

American pop-rock band

From left, Arrows in Action members Matt Fowler, Victor Viramontes-Pattison, and Jesse Frimmel

Arrows in Action is a Nashville-based pop-rock trio originating in Gainesville, Florida. The group is composed of singer/guitarist Victor Viramontes-Pattison, drummer Jesse Frimmel, and lead guitarist Matt Fowler. The band has released three full-length albums, as well as numerous EPs and singles, with over 223,000,000 streams across various platforms.

== History ==
=== Early work ===
Although Frimmel began laying the foundation for Arrows in Action in 2012, the band had several years of rotating members, and an official lineup was not formally established until 2017 during the members' attendance at the University of Florida. Originally formed as a passion project in the Gainesville underground music scene, drummer and founding member Jesse Frimmel met Victor Viramontes-Pattison at an acoustic set that Viramontes-Pattison was playing, leading the two to collaborate musically over the next several years. By 2015, Adrian DeZayas had joined on as a singer, songwriter, and guitarist, but ultimately left the band in late 2018, as announced by the band on their podcast and Facebook site. Tony Farrah also briefly played bass before parting ways with the current trio in 2021 to pursue other projects. With the formal addition of Fowler as lead guitarist upon DeZayas' departure, the current lineup was finalized.

By 2020, the band had released several singles and extended plays; these include their April 23, 2016, debut EP Running From The Sun and the sophomore EP Coasting, released on October 29, 2017. During 2018 the band wrote and demoed tracks for their eventual 2019 release of the EP Hell in Paradise. During this period of growth, the trio began outsourcing management and art production to their friend Jacob McKay. Soon after the band began working with Tennessee-based musician and producer Dan Swank (associated with such acts as All Time Low and Charlotte Sands), who helped propel forward early singles Honey, This Time, and Failing on Purpose.

In November 2019, Arrows in Action won FM 101.9's Big Break battle of the band competition at the station's Florida Man Music Festival. The prize of the competition, in which the winner was determined by listener vote, had the band open for well-known acts The 1975 and Jimmy Eat World. The same year, Arrows in Action supported rock band The Home Team for a limited run of shows in Florida as part of a DIY east coast tour. The two bands continue to collaborate extensively, featuring on each other's tracks and playing multiple tours together. Arrows in Action planned a similar month-long DIY-style tour for April 2020, but this was ultimately cancelled due to the 2020 coronavirus pandemic. The band sought ways to connect with and widen their fanbase virtually on online platforms like Instagram, TikTok, and YouTube. The three bandmates, who were living together at the time, also took the pandemic shutdown period as a chance to refocus on writing and production, returning to work with Dan Swank once more in autumn of 2020 before the November 2020 release of Honey and subsequent singles This Time and Failing on Purpose in April, 2021.

=== Be More ===
On October 1, 2021, Arrows in Action released their longest EP yet, Be More, heralded by the June 15 release of the single Only Be Mine. Providing seven new tracks to the band's growing discography, the work deals with themes of inner conflict, compromise, and isolation through emotional lyrics and contrasting upbeat rhythms and vocals. Stated influences on Be More include bands such as The Maine, The Band Camino, Bearings, and Bring Me the Horizon. The album also features pop-punk/alternative singer-songwriter Taylor Acorn on the album's fifth track and last single, Uncomfortably Numb. As of September 23, 2026, the song has nearly 30 million streams on Spotify and remains one of the Arrows in Action's most-streamed songs. The band also later performed with the singer during the 2021 This Wild Life tour, during which Arrows in Action also assumed the role of Acorn's live band.

=== Built to Last ===
Singer Victor Viramontes-Pattison performing in 2024 at UC Theatre Taube Family Music Hall

Following their return from supporting Magnolia Park on their headliner Baku's Revenge Tour, Arrows in Action released their debut full-length album Built to Last on May 26, 2023. The 13-track album was ushered in by six singles, released in the order they were written: Put You Through Me (April 4, 2022), Over It (June 24, 2022), High (October 14, 2022), The Credits featuring Magnolia Park (February 24, 2023), Head in the Clouds (April 14, 2023), and Checking In (May 12, 2023). The album was written over the course of a year and a half and several writing trips to different locations, which informed the tone of various songs on Built to Last. The band also cites a range of diverse artists as sonic inspiration, including 5 Seconds of Summer, Foo Fighters, Charlie Puth, Demi Lovato, Post Malone, Maroon 5, The Aces, and Bad Suns. Throughout the album are callbacks to the band's earlier pop-punk and rock roots, resulting in a well-rounded sound praised by critics. With relatable themes of nostalgia, growth, and uncertainty, Built to Last 's cohesion and narrative presentation has earned the album over 56 million total streams on Spotify as of September 13, 2026. On July 5, 2023, the band kicked off their first nationwide U.S. and partial-Canada tour with support from Honey Revenge and Finish Ticket.

=== I Think I've Been Here Before – Present ===
Between their debut album and the official release of their sophomore LP, Arrows in Action toured heavily, supporting such acts as Marianas Trench, The Home Team, and Charlotte Sands. The band played the United Kingdom for the first time with The Summer Set as part of The Blossom Tour UK tour in November 2023. On the heels of touring with Taylor Acorn on her Australian tour came the band's single Cold, released on March 8, 2024. It was three months later on May 31, 2024, that the first single off the band's newest album I Think I've Been Here Before was released. Hello Sunlight, set the tone for Side A of the album; Side B was released later that September. The band then took June and July for their two-month Back to Life tour of the U.K. and U.S.

On October 23, 2024, Arrows in Action released the single Cheekbones. The song made an immediate impact on social media like TikTok and remains the band's highest-streaming song on all major platforms, with over 27 million online streams as of September 2026. While the group's production and influence had steadily grown, the viral social media sensation that followed Cheekbones brought more visibility to the band than ever before. It was in the midst of this release that the long-independent Arrows in Action officially signed to Nettwerk Music Group in November 2024.

Following the success of Cheekbones, several more singles were released before the September 16, 2025, release of Side B of the album. This release of the full album showcased the distinct differences between Side A and Side B, with Side A exhibiting a bright and buoyant feel and a cooler, darker Side B. On September 10, 2026, the trio began their second headline tour, I Think I've Toured Here Before, of the continental U.S.

== Style ==
Although originating in the realm of indie pop-punk, Arrows in Action has continued to explore a variety of styles and influences. Known for guitar-driven melodies, catchy hooks, and energetic presentation, the band has also drawn sonic inspiration from 21st century musical pillars such as Fall Out Boy, Panic! at the Disco, The 1975, Boys Like Girls, Bad Suns, and The Band Camino, as well as 90s rock like Third Eye Blind and New Radicals, and even disco and funk. The band’s writing process is highly collaborative.

With the release of I Think I’ve Been Here Before, the band showed off a more polished, pop sound emerging as they've grown. Singer Victor Viramontes-Pattison told Rock Sound Magazine that "many of those [musical] itches came from the realisation that they aren’t tied to the traditional structures often associated with pop, rock, and alternative music".
