= Wellsville, New York =

- Town
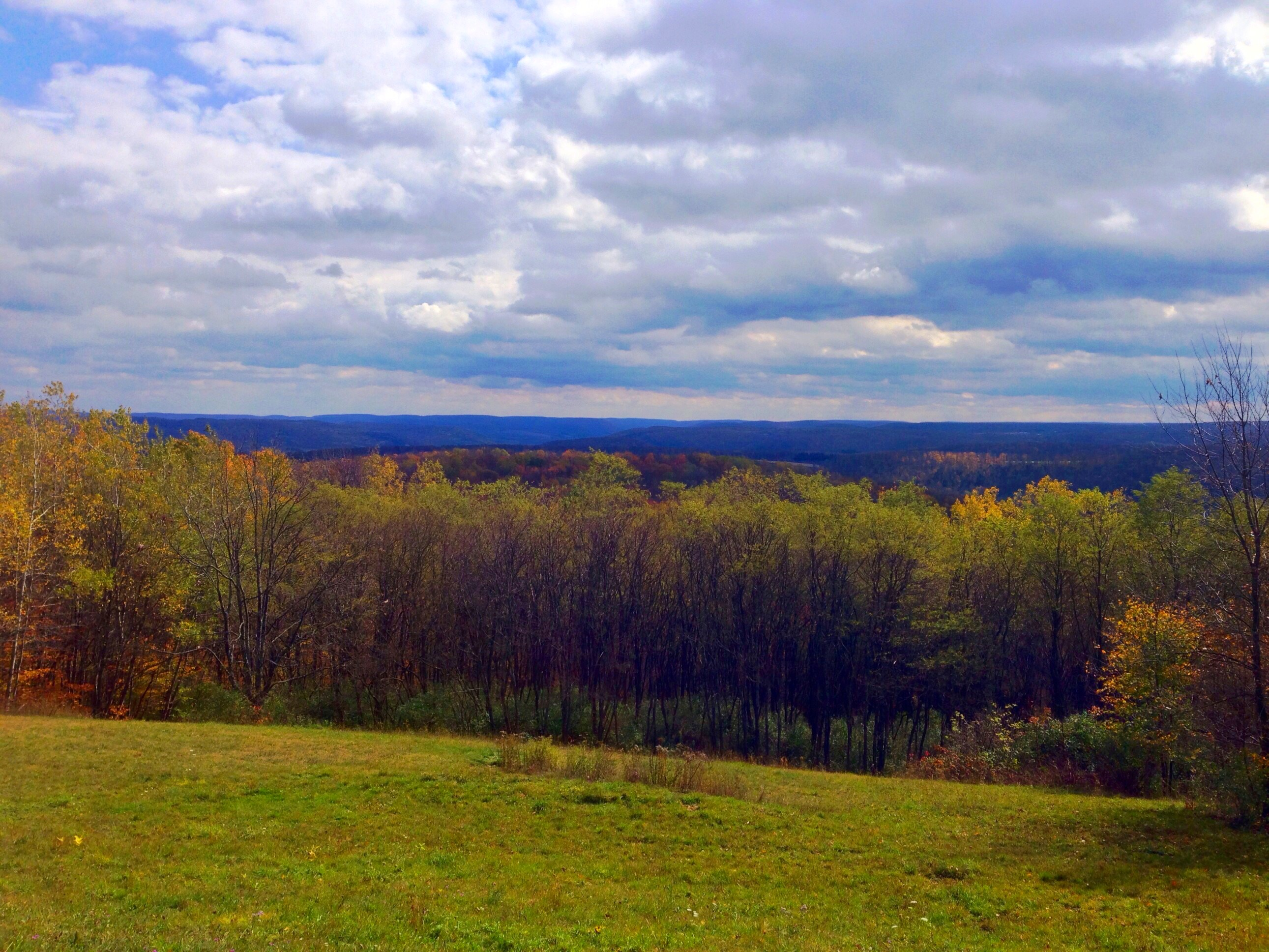
- Landscape in Wellsville

- Location in the state of New York Wellsville (the United States)
- Coordinates: 42°7′19″N 77°56′53″W
- Country: United States
- State: New York
- County: Allegany

Government
  - Type: Town Council
  - Town Supervisor: Darwin Fanton (R)
  - Town Council: Members' List: • Thomas Hennessy (R); • Timothy McNulty (R); • Ronald G. Taylor (R); • Shad Alsworth (R)

Area
  - Total: 36.68 sq mi (95.01 km^{2})
  - Land: 36.64 sq mi (94.91 km^{2})
  - Water: 0.039 sq mi (0.10 km^{2})
- Elevation: 1,505 ft (459 m)

Population (2020)
  - Total: 7,099 ▼
  - Estimate (2021): 7,031
  - Density: 193.4/sq mi (74.69/km^{2})
- Time zone: Eastern (EST)
- ZIP Code: 14895
- FIPS code: 36-003-79103
- Website: www.wellsvilletown.gov

Wellsville is a town and largest community in Allegany County, New York, United States. As of the 2020 census, the town had a population of 7,099.

Wellsville is centrally located in the south half of the county, 8 miles (13 km) north of the Pennsylvania border. Wellsville is also the name of the main village within this town. The village and the town have two separate, paid governments. Alfred State College maintains a branch campus in the town, with the main campus in Alfred 7 miles (11 km) east.

== History ==
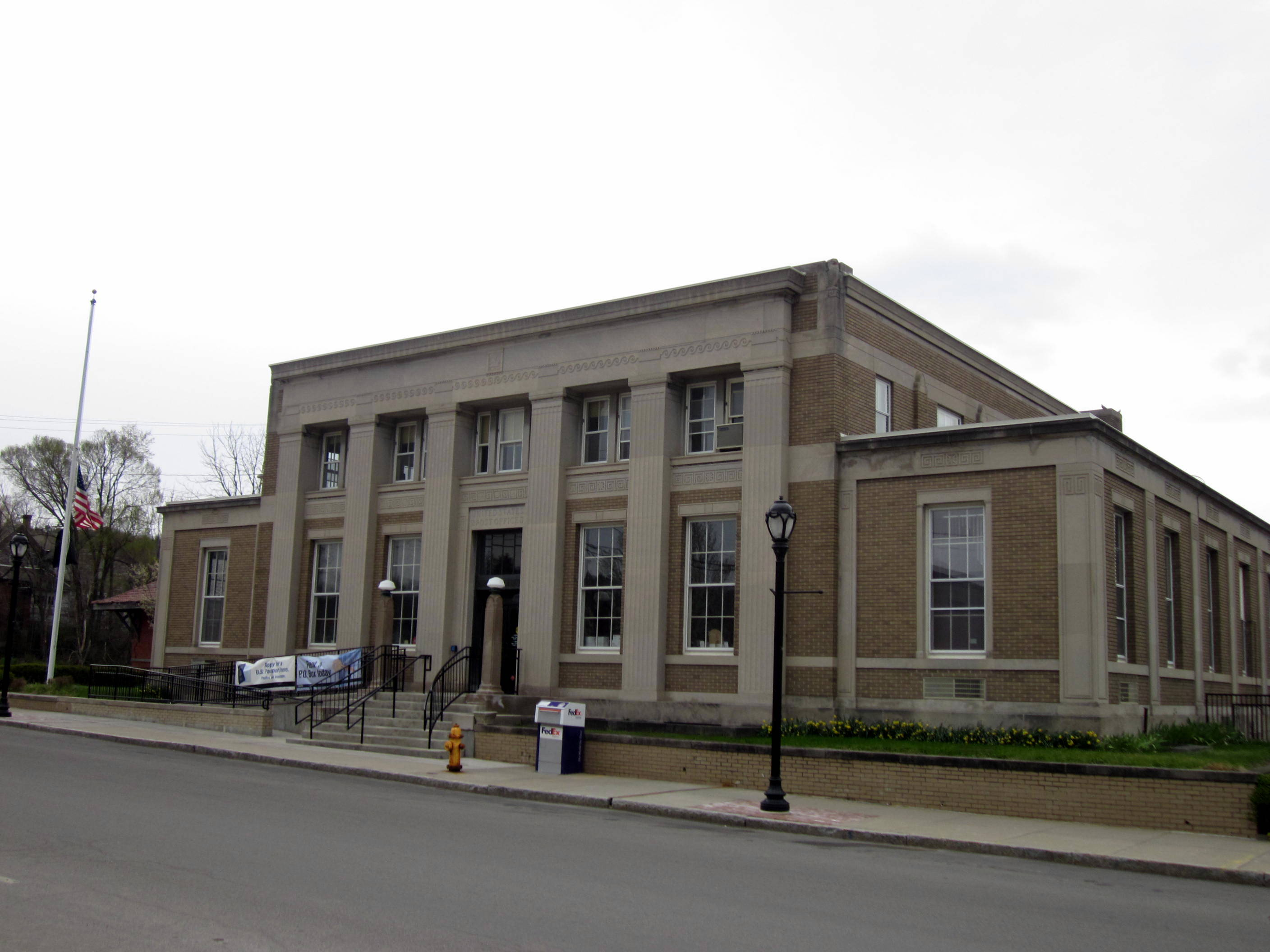
Post Office in Wellsville

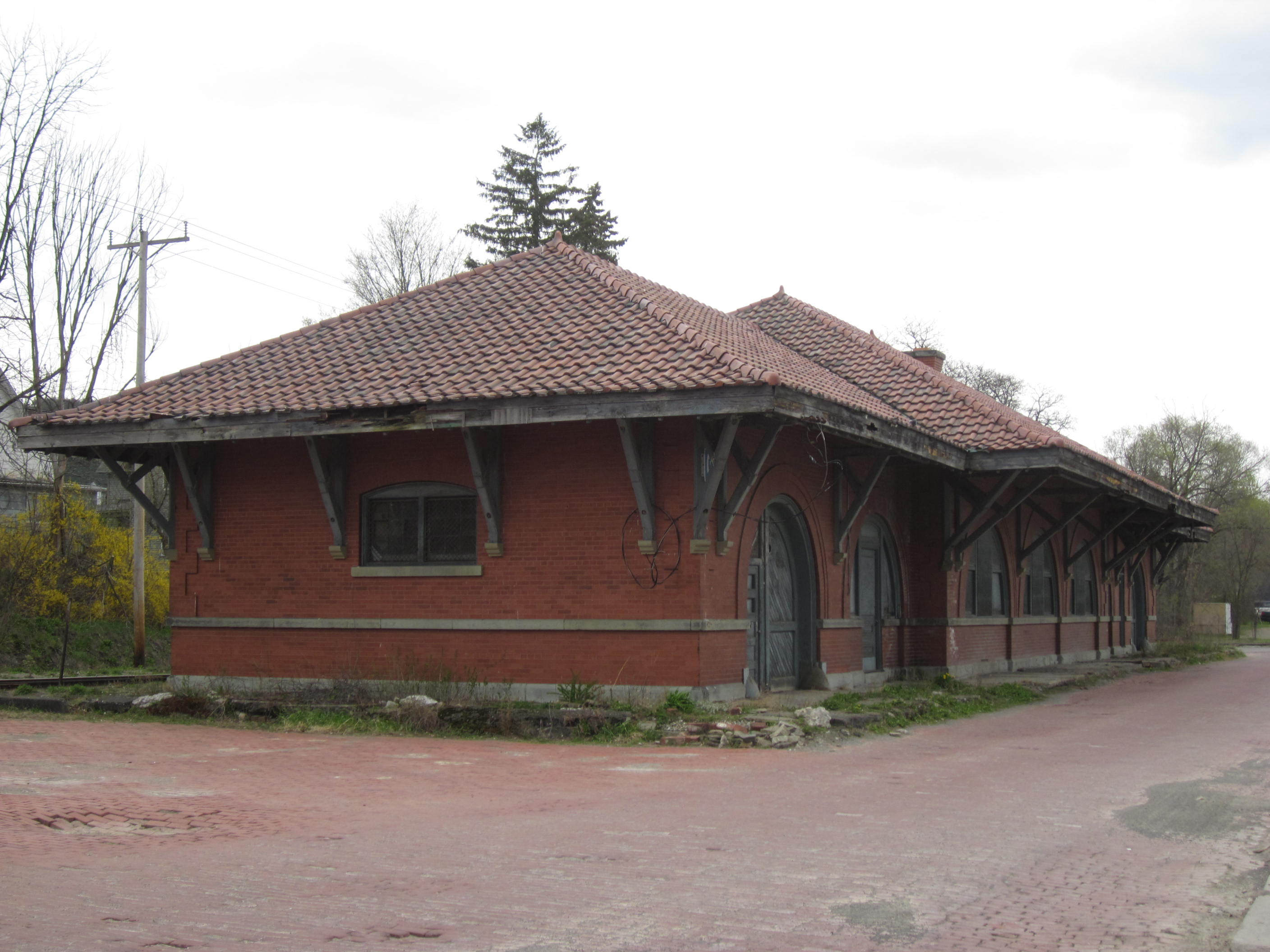
Erie Railroad Depot

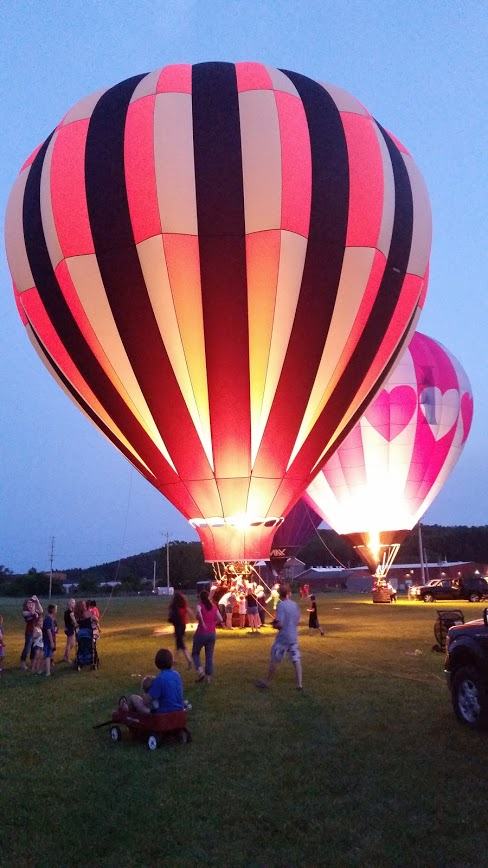
Hot Air Balloons at Great Wellsville Balloon Rally

Originally an encampment for native peoples, Wellsville's settlement was driven, first, by the tanning and lumber industries and, later, the discovery of oil and natural gas.

Wellsville was the location of encampments for thousands of years, including the Lamoka and Brewerton cultures. The latest native people, the Seneca, named Wellsville Gistaguat, according to a map produced in 1771 by Guy Johnson, as the official map of New York state at the time, for then-Governor William Tryon. The Seneca referred to the Wellsville area as "the Pigeon Woods" and held annual festivals and encampments there to take advantage of the passenger pigeon according to the memoirs of Captain Horatio Jones. At the time, passenger pigeons filled the skies by the millions, and the tribes and bands came to the Wellsville area from all over western New York and northern Pennsylvania to Gistaquat to harvest the pigeons by the thousands.

European settlers moved into the area before 1800. Nathaniel Dyke, a native of Connecticut, and a captain in the Revolutionary War, serving under both General George Washington and General Warren of Bunker Hill fame, was the first of these in Allegany County. He married a Native American woman (Esther) and moved his family to the Wellsville area by 1795, while it was still owned by the Seneca Nation (two years before the Big Tree Treaty of 1797). He began running a gristmill, a sawmill, and a tannery on a stream now known as Dykes Creek, by 1803. Dyke is buried in Elm Valley, just east of town. His tombstone has the official memorial placed there by the Catherine Schuyler Chapter of the Daughters of the American Revolution.

Wellsville's first industry was tanning, utilizing the bark of the hemlock tree for its tannins. Three large tanneries operated in Wellsville during the early 19th century. Next came the lumbermen and the railroad. The New York and Erie Railroad came through what would become Wellsville (then the outskirts of Scio) in 1851 as the quickest way west from New York City, crossing New York state. This proved that Nathaniel Dyke's choice of location was the quickest, easiest and most practical way across Allegany County. The trains gave the lumbermen a new and more efficient means to get their product to market. Prior to this, the logs had been floated on the rivers and canals. Logging moved on to more densely forested areas in the latter part of the 19th century but the cleared ground quickly produced excellent grazing for a tremendous dairy industry which followed.

Wellsville was named after a man named Gardiner Wells, who was, according to local history, the one person who didn't show up for the meeting when the residents were naming the town. Wells was the major landowner of the real estate pieces, now the downtown Main Street section of Wellsville. The first oil boom came later in Wellsville's history, several decades after the founding of the town and village when oil was discovered in Wellsville in 1879 by O.P. Taylor in his famous "Triangle No. 1" well in Petrolia, west of Wellsville. A second boom occurred with the discovery of "Secondary Recovery", led by Bradley Producing, based in Wellsville. The method uses water, so abundant in Wellsville, to force the oil from the "oil sands". The Sinclair Refinery was built in Wellsville at the beginning of the 20th century, not closing down until 1957 after two major fires and falling oil prices.

Since World War II, Wellsville's economy has been dominated by skilled engineering and manufacturing with a cluster of multinational companies in the energy sector. It also has a cluster of ceramic artists and artisans fed by its proximity to Alfred University's ceramics school.

The area that is now Wellsville was part of Scio through the first half of the 19th century. It was incorporated as Wellsville and set apart from Scio in 1857. For a brief time during the early 1870s, Wellsville changed its name to "Genesee". On April 4, 1871, the New York State Legislature officially changed Wellsville's name to Genesee. After much political wrangling, by a special act of the legislature, the name Wellsville was again designated as the official name of the town, June 8, 1873. The village of Wellsville was first incorporated in 1857 and then again in 1873.

Wellsville is the junction of many foothill streams including Dyke Creek feeding the Genesee River from the east. The water from Hurricane Agnes in 1972 exceeded the capacity and banks of Dyke Creek, producing a rapid and huge pool of water at the center of the village. The extent of the damaged area continued downstream through Scio and Amity until the valley widened to accept the large flow of water in the lesser populated area. Erosion of topsoil during this flood eliminated many small farms.

The US Post Office-Wellsville, built by the Works Progress Administration during the Great Depression in the art deco style, was listed on the National Register of Historic Places in 1989.^{[5]}

The Wellsville Erie Depot is a historic train station located at Wellsville in Allegany County, New York. It was constructed in 1911, for the Erie Railroad. It is a one-story, 132-foot (40 m) by 33-foot (10 m) structure displaying elements of the Queen Anne and Romanesque Revival styles popular in the late 19th and early 20th century. It is located across the street from the US Post Office-Wellsville. It was listed on the National Register of Historic Places in 1987.

In March 2006, a referendum to dissolve the village was defeated by the residents. At present, local officials are attempting to obtain a charter for the community to reorganize both municipalities into one entity, a city.

== Geography ==
According to the United States Census Bureau, the town has a total area of 36.7 square miles (95.0 km^{2}), of which 36.6 square miles (94.9 km^{2}) is land and 0.04 square miles (0.1 km^{2}), or 0.10%, is water.

The Genesee River flows northward through the town.

New York State Route 417 intersects New York State Route 19 at Wellsville village, and NY 19 intersects New York State Route 248 by the south town line in Stannards.

=== Communities and locations ===
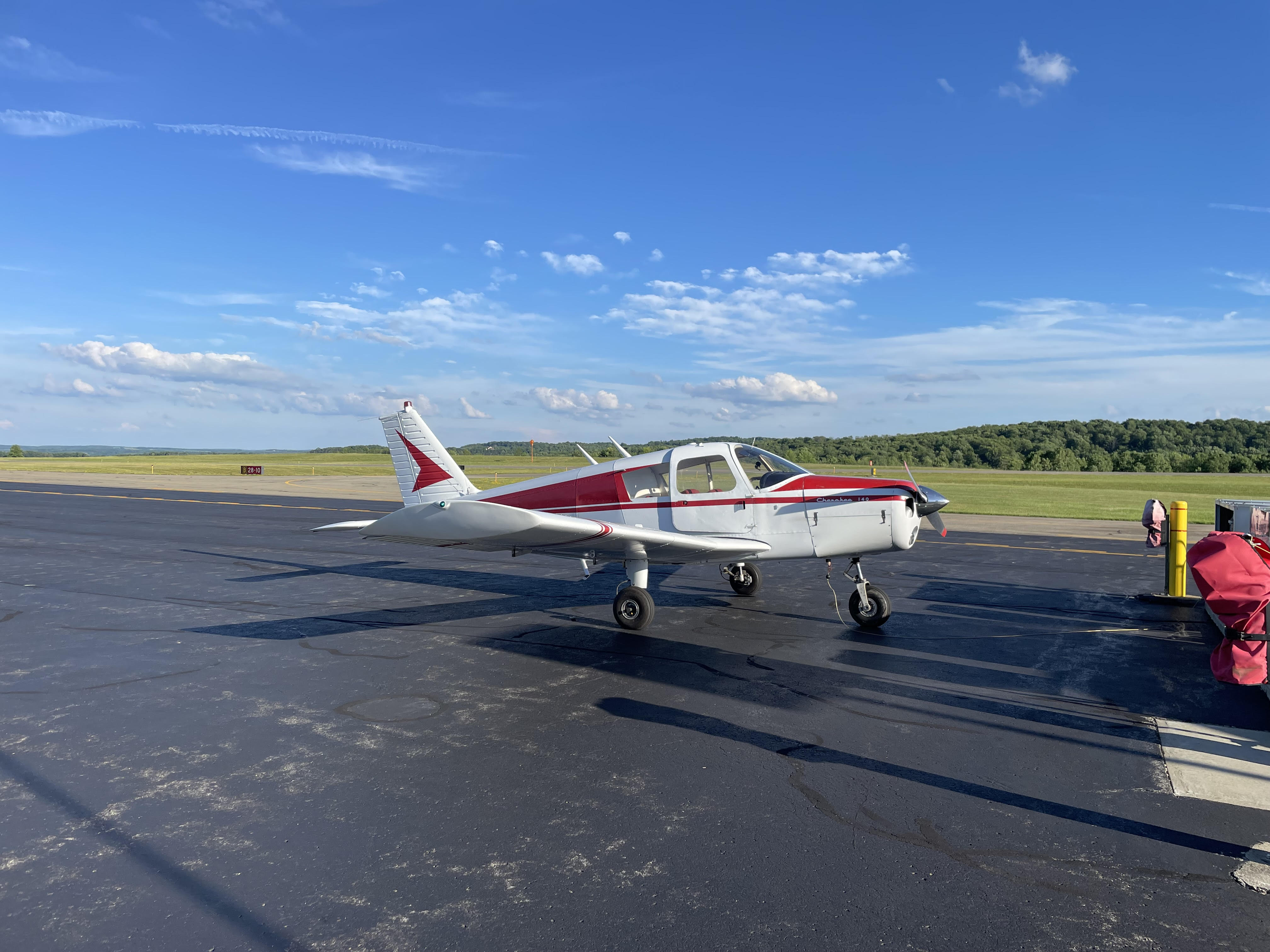
Wellsville Airport

- Dykes Creek – a stream that joins the Genesee River in Wellsville village, named after Allegany County's and Wellsville's first settler, Nathaniel Dike.
- Elm Valley – a hamlet.
- Sunnydale/Proctor District – A neighborhood dominated by post-war homes located near Ljungstrom's Andover Road manufacturing facility.
- Norton Summit
- Stannards – a hamlet.
- Wellsville – a village.
- Wellsville Municipal Airport, Tarantine Field – a general aviation airport.
- Petrolia.
- Tullar Field - minor league baseball field from 1914 to 1965.

=== Climate ===
Climate data for Wellsville, New York (1991–2020)
Month	Jan	Feb	Mar	Apr	May	Jun	Jul	Aug	Sep	Oct	Nov	Dec	Year
Mean daily maximum °F (°C)	30.6 (−0.8)	33.0 (0.6)	41.5 (5.3)	54.8 (12.7)	67.7 (19.8)	75.0 (23.9)	79.2 (26.2)	77.6 (25.3)	70.5 (21.4)	58.3 (14.6)	45.9 (7.7)	35.4 (1.9)	55.8 (13.2)
Daily mean °F (°C)	21.7 (−5.7)	23.6 (−4.7)	30.9 (−0.6)	42.5 (5.8)	54.4 (12.4)	62.7 (17.1)	66.7 (19.3)	65.7 (18.7)	58.4 (14.7)	47.5 (8.6)	36.7 (2.6)	27.7 (−2.4)	44.9 (7.1)
Mean daily minimum °F (°C)	12.9 (−10.6)	14.2 (−9.9)	20.4 (−6.4)	30.2 (−1.0)	41.2 (5.1)	50.4 (10.2)	54.1 (12.3)	53.8 (12.1)	46.3 (7.9)	36.7 (2.6)	27.5 (−2.5)	20.0 (−6.7)	34.0 (1.1)
Average precipitation inches (mm)	2.70 (69)	1.87 (47)	2.53 (64)	3.49 (89)	3.64 (92)	4.09 (104)	4.20 (107)	4.01 (102)	3.59 (91)	3.96 (101)	2.78 (71)	2.83 (72)	39.69 (1,009)
Average snowfall inches (cm)	15.1 (38)	11.4 (29)	8.0 (20)	1.8 (4.6)	0.1 (0.25)	0.0 (0.0)	0.0 (0.0)	0.0 (0.0)	0.0 (0.0)	0.5 (1.3)	5.1 (13)	12.1 (31)	54.1 (137.15)
Source: NOAA

== Demographics ==
Historical population
Census	Pop.	Note	%±
1860	2,432		—
1870	3,781		55.5%
1880	4,259		12.6%
1890	4,765		11.9%
1900	4,981		4.5%
1910	5,663		13.7%
1920	6,171		9.0%
1930	6,909		12.0%
1940	7,641		10.6%
1950	8,555		12.0%
1960	8,278		−3.2%
1970	8,368		1.1%
1980	8,658		3.5%
1990	8,116		−6.3%
2000	7,678		−5.4%
2010	7,397		−3.7%
2020	7,099		−4.0%
2021 (est.)	7,031	▼	−1.0%
U.S. Decennial Census

As of the census of 2000, there were 7,678 people, 3,192 households, and 1,924 families residing in the town. The population density was 209.4 inhabitants per square mile (80.8/km^{2}). There were 3,606 housing units at an average density of 98.4 per square mile (38.0/km^{2}). The racial makeup of the town was 96.65% White, 0.53% Black or African American, 0.26% Native American, 1.24% Asian, 0.00% Pacific Islander, 0.21% from other races, and 1.11% from two or more races. 0.72% of the population were Hispanic or Latino of any race.

There were 3,192 households, out of which 26.9% had children under the age of 18 living with them, 46.9% were married couples living together, 9.9% had a female householder with no husband present, and 39.7% were non-families. 33.6% of all households were made up of individuals, and 15.2% had someone living alone who was 65 years of age or older. The average household size was 2.29 and the average family size was 2.92.

In the town, the population was spread out, with 22.9% under the age of 18, 7.5% from 18 to 24, 25.2% from 25 to 44, 23.7% from 45 to 64, and 20.7% who were 65 years of age or older. The median age was 41 years. For every 100 females, there were 90.4 males. For every 100 females age 18 and over, there were 86.5 males.

The median income for a household in the town was $30,098, and the median income for a family was $39,705. Males had a median income of $36,302 versus $23,387 for females. The per capita income for the town was $18,744. 16.0% of the population and 10.6% of families were below the poverty line. 17.9% of those under the age of 18 and 9.2% of those 65 and older were living below the poverty line.

== Economy ==
Ljungstrom designs and manufactures in Wellsville products for the thermal power plant market, namely air preheaters and gas-gas heaters for thermal power generation facilities.

Northern Lights Candle Company, a manufacturer, retailer and wholesale distributor of candles and novelties, is headquartered in Wellsville.

== Arts and culture ==
=== Public libraries ===
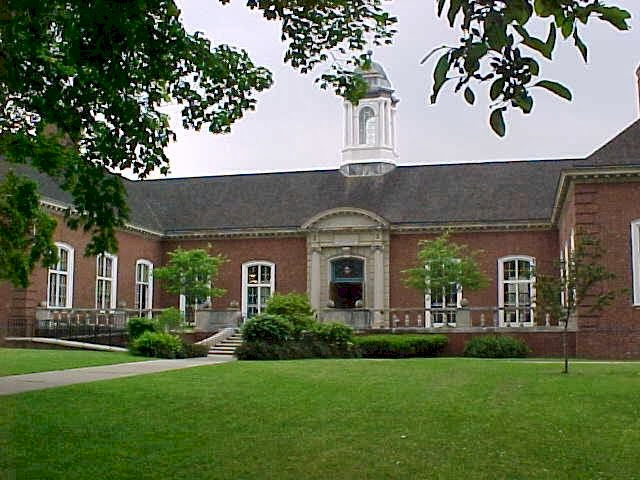
David A. Howe Library in Wellsville

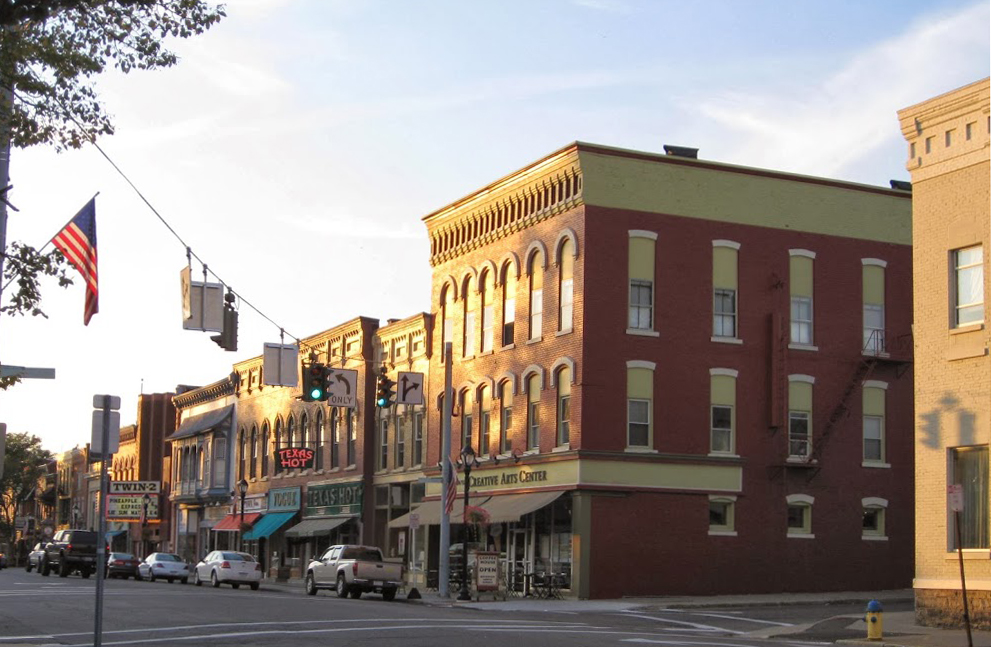
Wellsville Creative Arts Center

=== Landmarks ===
The David A. Howe Library, built in 1910, is a member of the Southern Tier Library System, and is the largest public library in Allegany County.

The Pink House—now a city restaurant—is an Italianate-Revival mansion constructed between 1866 and 1869. The estate grounds include a carriage house, fossil house, and ice house. The fossil house once contained over 5,500 catalogued Paleozoic specimens, part of a collection that won first place at the 1901 Pan-American Exposition. The Birthmark (1987) was filmed here.

The Wellsville Creative Arts Center opened in 2006. It features ceramics and cooking classes, and live music shows.

=== Annual events ===
- The Great Wellsville Balloon Rally
- Ridgewalk and Run trail race, founded in 1993.
- The Great Wellsville Trout Derby

== Education ==
=== Primary and secondary schools ===
Wellsville Central School District serves pre-K-12 on two campuses. In 2004, the district creating a new middle school, additions to the high and elementary schools, and a new swimming pool. In 2010, the district upgraded the elementary school and athletic fields, with a stadium.

=== Colleges ===
Alfred State College's School of Applied Technology includes the culinary arts school, automotive department, building trades, and a sustainable advanced manufacturing center.

== Notable people ==
- Nick Anderson, frontman of the pop rock band the Wrecks, the band's sophomore EP Panic Vertigo was also produced on a ranch in Wellsville
- Chris Beck, former United States Navy SEAL, who gained public attention in 2013 when she came out as a trans woman, after 10 years, he reverted to living as a man
- William B. Duke, horse trainer, won the 1925 Kentucky Derby and the 1925 Preakness Stakes, inducted in U.S Racing Hall of Fame
- George "Gabby" Hayes, actor in many western movies
- Billy Packer, former sports broadcaster and author, born in Wellsville
- John Rigas, founder of Adelphia Communications Corporation, former owner of Buffalo Sabres
- Charles Monroe Sheldon (minister), and leader of the Social Gospel movement
- John Sterling, New York Yankees broadcaster who started his career at WLSV-AM in Wellsville
- Jack Stevenson, author, film showman, born in Wellsville
- Ted Taylor, nuclear physicist who became a nuclear disarmament advocate

== See also ==
- Wellsville Raceway
