= Great Wellsville Balloon Rally =

Hot Air Balloon Festival

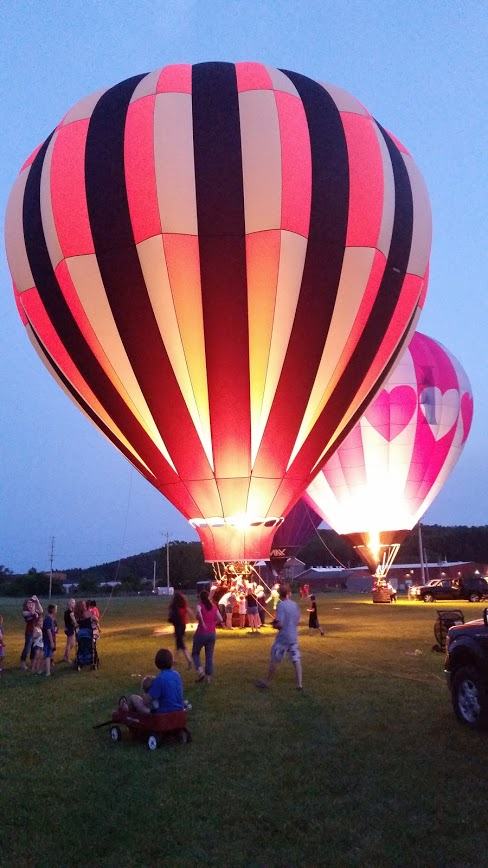
- Genre: Hot Air Balloon Festival
- Date: Third Full Weekend of July
- Frequency: Annually
- Venue: Island Park
- Location: Wellsville, New York
- Country: United States
- Inaugurated: June 1975
- Website: https://wellsvilleballoonrally.com

The Great Wellsville Balloon Rally is an annually held hot-air balloon festival that takes place in Wellsville, New York on the third full weekend of July.

The event includes up to four balloon launches Friday afternoon, Saturday morning, Saturday afternoon, and Sunday morning. The weekend before features a parade through main street. Other events during the weekend includes a balloon afterglow, a Main Street Festival with over 145 local vendors and businesses, and fireworks.

== History ==
The Great Wellsville Balloon Rally was founded in 1975 by a local group of volunteers. Originally conceived as an air show, the attractions included in-the-air and ground displays of home-built aircraft, antique planes, and war birds. Inspired by the 1975 film, The Great Waldo Pepper, which brought to mind the exciting days of early aviation, the organizers named the event "The Great Wellsville Air Show.
