= Lovelytheband =

American indie rock band

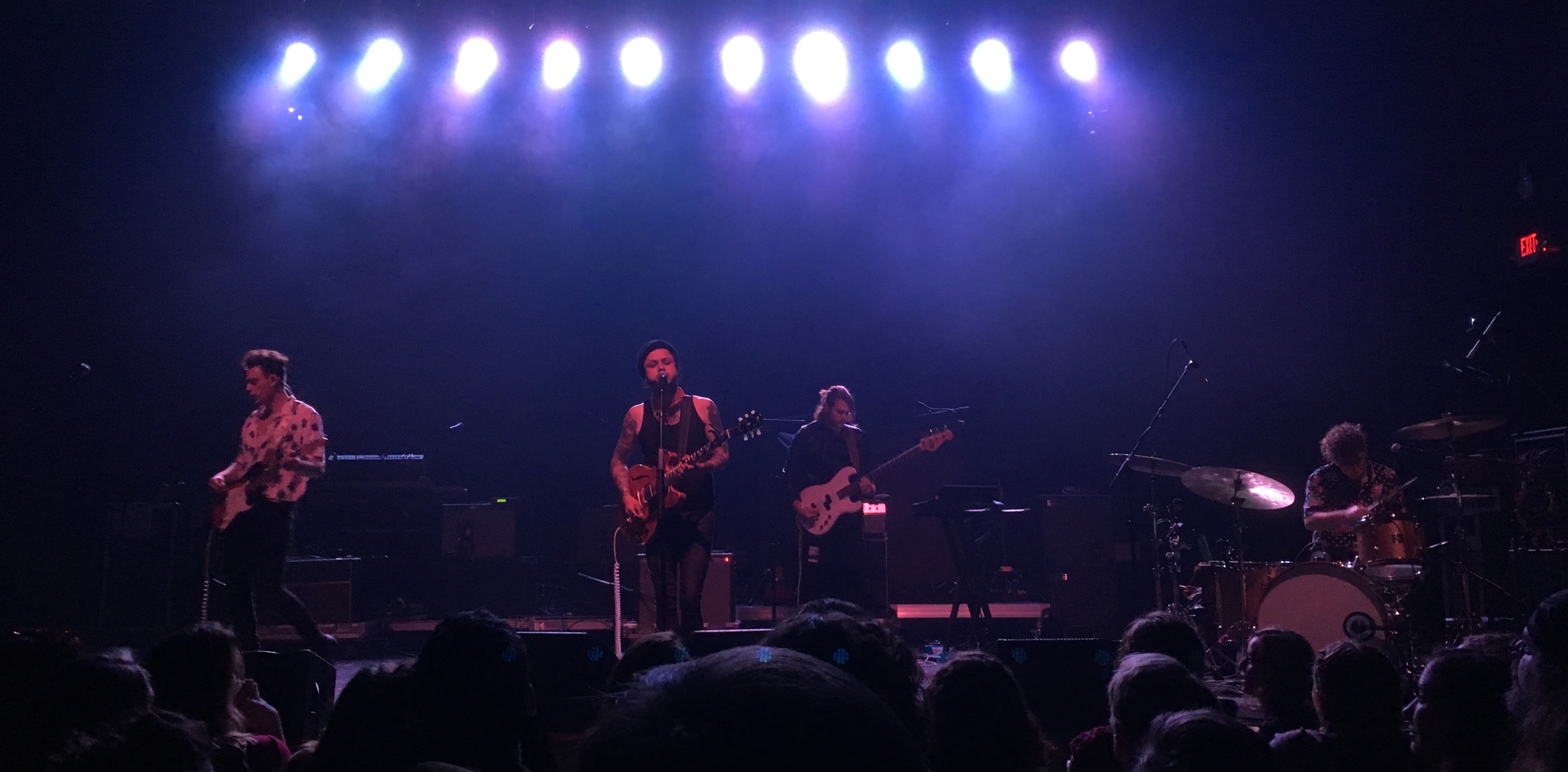
- From left to right: Jordan Greenwald, Mitchy Collins, and Sam Price.

Background information
- Origin: Los Angeles, California, U.S.
- Genres: Indie pop; indie rock; alternative rock
- Years active: 2016–present
- Labels: Another Century; Century Media; RED
- Members: Mitchy Collins; Jordan Greenwald
- Past members: Sam Price
- Website: lovelytheband.com

Lovelytheband (stylized in all lowercase) is an American rock band that formed in 2016 in Los Angeles, California, United States. The band currently consists of vocalist Mitchy Collins, and guitarist Jordan Greenwald. The band is most known for their single "Broken" which charted on several US Billboard charts.

The band debuted in April 2017 with their single "Broken" which quickly earned over three million streams on Spotify. The single charted on several Billboard charts. It topped the Billboard Alternative Songs chart and Billboard Rock Airplay chart for several weeks. The single also became the band's first top 10 on the Billboard Radio Songs chart and first top 40 on the Billboard Hot 100.

In September 2017, the band released their first EP, Everything I Could Never Say.... They released the single "These Are My Friends" in May 2018. On August 3, 2018, they released their debut album Finding It Hard to Smile.

== Career ==
=== 2016–2018: "Broken" and Everything I Could Never Say... ===
Mitchy Collins, Jordan Greenwald, and Sam Price met and formed the band while at a nightclub in West Hollywood. The band then released their debut single, "Broken", in April 2017.

"Broken" appeared on several Billboard charts. It topped the Billboard Alternative Songs chart, dated April 21, 2018, and stayed on top for seven consecutive weeks. It topped the Billboard Rock Airplay chart, dated June 9, 2018, and remained on top for nine consecutive weeks. It peaked at number 10 on the Billboard Radio Songs chart (airplay chart across all genres), number 14 on the Mainstream Top 40 chart (airplay chart for pop songs), and number 29 on the Billboard Hot 100. The single became the band's first top 10 on the Billboard Radio Songs chart and first top 40 on the Hot 100. It was also one of the four songs in 2018 that managed to chart in both the Alternative Songs chart and the Top 10 of the Radio Songs chart.

After signing with Another Century Records, they released their debut EP, Everything I Could Never Say..., in September 2017. The band then toured with The Wrecks and La Bouquet.

=== 2018–present: Finding It Hard to Smile and Conversations with Myself About You ===
On May 11, 2018, the band released the single "These Are My Friends" from their upcoming début album. The album, Finding It Hard to Smile, was then released on August 3, 2018.

The band went on their first headlining tour, the Broken Like Me Tour, which started on August 15, 2018. The tour visited Canada and the United States. They also toured as the opening act for the European leg of 5 Seconds of Summer's Meet You There Tour. The band then embarked on their second headlining tour, Finding It Hard to Smile Tour, to support their debut album. The tour visited cities across the US and Canada, beginning in March 2019.

On February 24, 2020, it was announced that Lovelytheband would be opening acts for Australian band 5 Seconds of Summer on the Latin America arena concert dates on their Take My Hand World Tour. Lovelytheband is set to be opening acts on three dates, starting on May 18, 2022 at the Palacio de los Deportes Arena in Mexico City, Mexico.

On July 2, 2020, the band announced their second album, Conversations with Myself About You, which was released on August 28, 2020. It includes the singles "Loneliness for Love", "Waste", "I Should Be Happy", "IDWGTYP", and "Buzz Cut".

On October 30, 2020 the band released the single "Heartbreak of America" which highlighted problems in America such as gun violence, the 2020 presidential election, drug abuse, etc. The song was co-written by Foster the People frontman Mark Foster.

In May 2025, drummer Sam Price departed from the band.

== Band members ==
Current

- Mitch Collins – lead vocals, guitar (2016–present)
- Jordan Greenwald – guitar, keyboards (2016–present)

Former

- Sam Price – drums, percussion (2017–2025)

== Discography ==
=== Albums ===
- Finding It Hard to Smile (2018)
- Conversations with Myself About You (2020)
- If We're Being Honest (2023)
- Lovelytheband (2024)
- We’re All Feeling the Same (2026)

=== Extended plays ===
- Everything I Could Never Say... (2017)

=== Singles ===
==== As lead artist ====
Title	Year	Chart positions								Certifications	Album
Title	Year	US	US Adult	US Alt.	US Rock	US Rock Airplay	CAN	MEX Airplay	NZ Hot	Certifications	Album
"Broken"	2017	29	1	1	2	1	18	1	9	RIAA: 3× Platinum; MC: 2× Platinum; BPI: Silver	Finding It Hard to Smile
"These Are My Friends"	2018	—	—	10	20	11	—	—	—		Finding It Hard to Smile
"Maybe, I'm Afraid"	2019	—	—	13	36	22	—	—	—		Finding It Hard to Smile
"Loneliness for Love"	2020	—	22	7	13	10	—	—	—		Conversations with Myself About You
"Waste"	2020	—	—	—	—	—	—	—	—		Conversations with Myself About You
"I Should Be Happy"	2020	—	—	—	—	—	—	—	—		Conversations with Myself About You
"Buzz Cut"	2020	—	—	22	—	—	—	—	—		Conversations with Myself About You
"Heartbreak of America"	2020	—	—	—	—	—	—	—	—		Non-album single
"Sail Away"	2022	—	29	3	46	—	—	—	—		If We're Being Honest
"Make Me Wanna Die"	2023	—	—	—	—	—	—	—	—		If We're Being Honest
"Sad Goodbyes"	2023	—	—	—	—	—	—	—	—		If We're Being Honest
"Nice to Know You"	2023	—	—	10	—	—	—	—	—		Lovelytheband
"Take Me to the Moon"	2024	—	—	—	—	—	—	—	—		Lovelytheband
"Kiss Me Goodbye"	2026	—	—	39	—	—	—	—	—		We're All Feeling the Same
"—" denotes a title that did not chart, or was not released in that territory.

==== As featured artist ====
Title	Year	Album
"Change Your Mind" (Dillon Francis featuring Lovelytheband)	2019	Non-album singles
"Games" (Tessa Violet featuring Lovelytheband)	2021	Non-album singles
"Miss You a Little" (Bryce Vine featuring Lovelytheband)	2021	Non-album singles

==== Promotional singles ====
Title	Year	Album
"Alone Time"	2018	Finding It Hard to Smile
"Pity Party"	2018	Finding It Hard to Smile
"IDWGTYP"	2020	Conversations with Myself About You
"Rock Bottom"	2024	Lovelytheband
"Feel Like Summer"	2024	Lovelytheband
"Day Run Out"	2024	Lovelytheband

=== Music videos ===
Title	Year	Director	Ref.
As lead artist
"Broken"	2017	Unknown	
"These Are My Friends"	2018	Hoeg/Beach	
"Maybe, I'm Afraid"	2019	Andrew Sandler	
"Loneliness for Love"	2020	Unknown	
"I Should Be Happy"	2020	Andrew S. Cohen and Ryan Kieffer	
"Buzz Cut"	2020	Bianca Gerasia	
"Waste"	2020	Unknown	
"Sail Away"	2023	Jonathan Hoeg	
"Make Me Wanna Die"	2023	Tanner Zagarino and Connor Brashier	
As featured artist
"Change Your Mind" (Dillon Francis featuring Lovelytheband)	2019	Brandon Dermer	
"The Idea of You" (Grady featuring Lovelytheband)	2021	Reggie.	

== Tours ==
=== Headlining act ===
- Broken Like Me Tour (August–October 2018)
- Finding It Hard to Smile Tour (2019)

=== Supporting act ===
- The Wrecks – Robot Army Tour (November–December 2017)
- Vance Joy – Nation of Two World Tour (April–May 2018)
- AWOLNATION – Here Come The Runts Tour (June 2018)
- 5 Seconds of Summer – Meet You There Tour (October–November 2018)
- LANY World Tour (European dates only) (2019)

== Awards and nominations ==
Billboard Music Awards

Year	Award	Result	Reference
2019	Top Rock Artist	Nominated	
2019	Top Rock Song ("Broken")	Nominated	

iHeartRadio Music Awards

Year	Award	Result	Reference
2019	Best New Rock/Alternative Artist	Won	
2019	Alternative Rock Artist of the Year	Nominated	
2019	Alternative Rock Song of the Year ("Broken")	Nominated	
