= Run River North =

American rock band

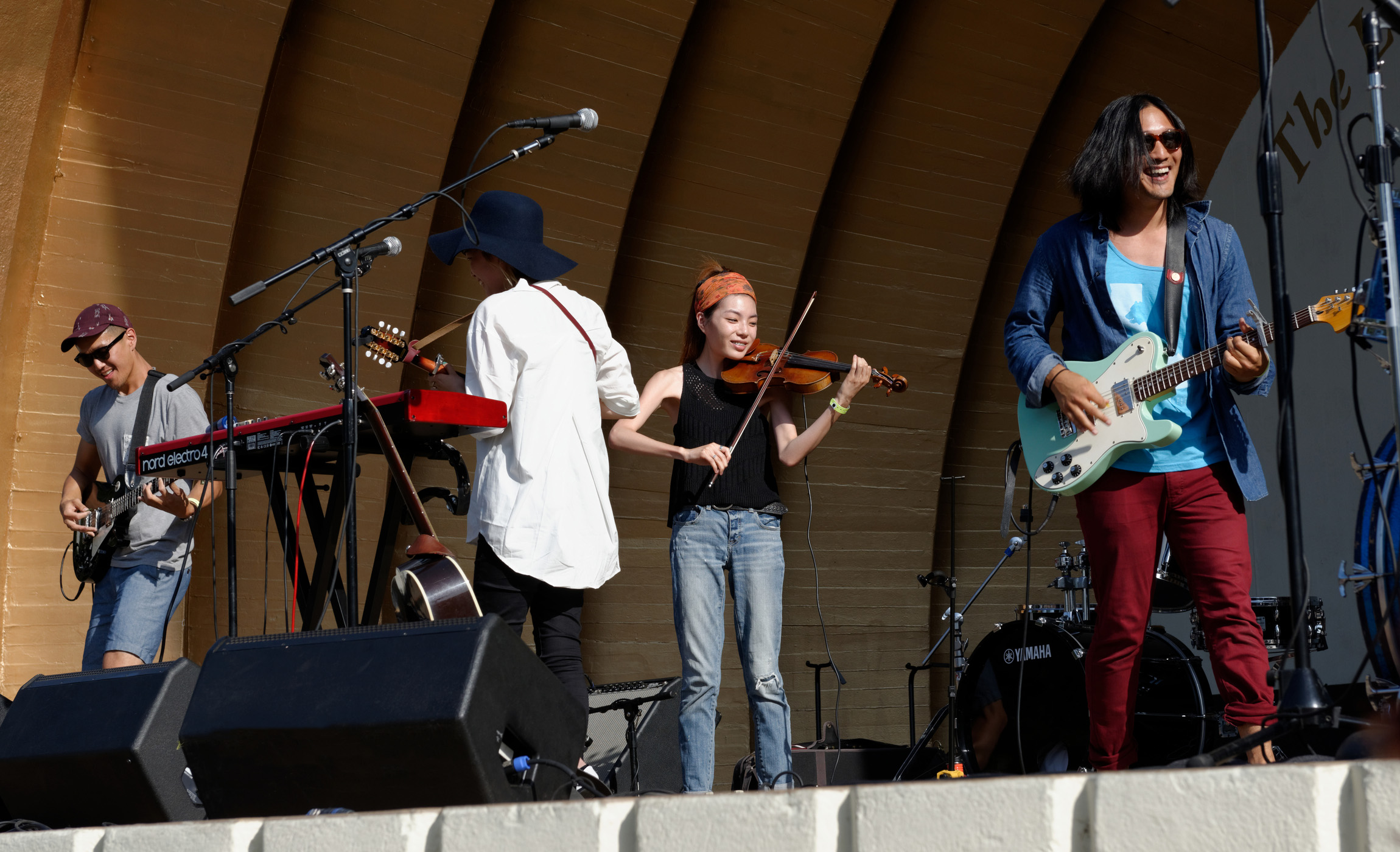
- Run River North performing in 2014

Background information
- Also known as: Monsters Calling Home
- Origin: Los Angeles, California, U.S.
- Genres: Folk rock; indie rock; indie pop
- Years active: 2011–2021; 2025–present
- Labels: Nettwerk
- Members: Daniel Chae; Alex Hwang; Sally Kang
- Past members: John Chong; Jennifer Rim; Joe Chun

Run River North is an American indie folk rock band from Los Angeles, California, formed in 2011. The band was formed as Monsters Calling Home, before changing their name in 2012 to avoid comparisons to indie folk band Of Monsters and Men.

The band was initially a sextet consisting of lead vocalist and guitarist Alex Hwang, guitarist and violinist Daniel Chae, violinist Jennifer Rim, keyboardist and vocalist Sally Kang, bassist Joe Chun, and drummer John Chong. Following Chong's departure in 2017 and Chun and Rim's departures in 2018, the band have been a trio consisting of Hwang, Chae, and Kang.

As of 2025, the band have released four studio albums, four EPs, and five live albums. All the band's current and former members are Korean-American.

== History ==
=== Monsters Calling Home ===
Monsters Calling Home formed in 2011, with early songs inspired by the band members' Korean-American background. The band performed at venues across Southern California, including Super Concert, the DRIP coffeeshop in Los Angeles' Koreatown, and the Kollaboration 11 competition at the Nokia Theatre on December 5, 2011.

Because the band recorded a music video in the band members' Honda cars, the car company secretly booked the band for a gig on Jimmy Kimmel Live! on September 18, 2012, and recorded the surprise as an ad.

=== Run River North ===
On November 16, 2012, the band changed their name from Monsters Calling Home to Run River North. On May 13, 2013, Nettwerk Music Group announced the signing of Run River North to their label. On December 2, 2013, they were featured on a PBS Artbound article as well as performing a set on Artbound's Studio A that included an interview.

The band released their self-titled, debut album, Run River North, on February 25, 2014

=== Drinking from a Salt Pond ===
On February 26, 2016, the band released their second studio album, Drinking from a Salt Pond.

The band was the featured musical guest on Late Night with Seth Meyers on April 26, 2016, performing the song "Run or Hide". In the spring, the band embarked on a headlining North American tour with The Wild Reeds. On August 12, Run River North performed at the Incheon Pentaport Rock Festival in Songdo Pentaport Park, Incheon, South Korea. Following Korea, they were part of Summer Sonic Festival in Japan, playing in Osaka on August 20, and in Tokyo on August 21. In the fall, the band opened with Irontom for Finish Ticket's fall tour.

=== Band member departures ===
In early 2017, drummer John Chong announced his departure from the band. He was replaced by Abe Kim. The band embarked on a headlining tour with Cobi in spring of the same year. In summer of 2017, the band opened for Rooney on their North American tour. On May 27, 2017, the band performed at the Bottlerock Music Festival in Napa, CA.

In early 2018, Jennifer Rim and Joe Chun left the band. Run River North became a 3-piece with Alex Hwang (guitar/vocals), Daniel Chae (guitars/vocals), and Sally Kang (keys/vocals).

=== Monsters Calling Home and going independent ===
In the Spring of 2019, the three-member band of Run River North performed at three venues for South by Southwest, Austin, Texas. Following SXSW, Run River North, accompanied by drummer Fer Fuentes, went on a 19-city spring tour to promote the upcoming Monsters Calling Home Volume 1 as well as new music. Later in the year, Run River North opened for the band Joseph during the California and Arizona stops of Joseph Tour promoting their album Good Luck, Kid.

The band released two new EPs in 2019. The first EP, Monsters Calling Home, Vol. 1, was released on May 3, 2019. The second EP, Monsters Calling Home, Vol. 2, was released on November 1, 2019.

In 2020, Run River North, accompanied by drummer Fer Fuentes and guitarist Andie Guerrero, went on a 21-city winter tour called "lonely weather, favorite sweater". On the end of their tour, Run River North announced that they were released by the Nettwerk Music Group and are an independent band again.

On April 10, 2020, the acoustic album MCH Vol 1 + 2 = 3 (SAD Takes) was released via digital music stores and digital music streaming services. During that weekend, Run River North participated in the online music festival TrillerFest. Following Trillerfest, the band started doing IG live streams on Tuesday nights.

On May 5, 2020, during their weekly IG Live stream, Run River North announced a Patreon page to help support the release of a new album. On May 23, 2020, Run River North participated on 3 livestreams on the same day: Kollaboration Empowered 2020, LiveFromHomeShow on twitch.tv, and Floated Magazine's Facebook Livestream.

=== Creatures in Your Head ===
With the fan support through Patreon, Run River North worked on a new album with both new music and previously released non-album singles. Starting on May 29, 2020, Run River North released new music videos for 6 singles off the new untitled album as well as releasing the singles via Spotify, iTunes, and various digital platforms. Run River North also released live recordings of their live music sessions via their Bandcamp page.

On February 11, 2021, Run River North broadcast a live set of the full album on YouTube, and then, on their Instagram Stories live. The following day, the 10-track album Creatures In Your Head was released to the public through digital media such as Spotify and iTunes. In March, the mobile recording studio group, Jam in the Van, released the live recording of Run River North's September 2020 live set for Jam in the Van's Speakeasy Sessions via Spotify

On April 14, 2021, the single "Slow and Steady" was released in coordination with the bottled water brand LIFEWTR as part of their Life Unseen campaign.

Starting on February 13, 2021, vocalist / keyboardist Sally Kang started posting "Sally's SNACK ATTACK ROAR" videos on the Run River North YouTube channel, with Sally (and bandmates), sampling snacks. As of 2024, there are 8 episodes posted on the Run River North YouTube channel.

From 2021 to 2025, the band was largely on hiatus.

In 2025, the band announced via Instagram that they had begun recording together again.

== Band members ==
=== Current members ===
- Alex Hwang – lead vocals, guitar (2011–present)
- Daniel Chae – guitars, vocals, violin, percussion (2011–present)
- Sally Kang – keyboards, vocals, bass, tambourine, melodica (2011–present)

=== Former members ===
- John Chong – drums, percussion (2011–2017)
- Joe Chun – bass (2011–2018)
- Jennifer Rim – violin, guitars, vocals (2011–2018)

=== Touring members ===
- Fer Fuentes – drums, percussion (2019–2021)
- Andie Guerrero – guitar (2019–2021)
- Keith "Stix" McJimson – drums, percussion (2018)
- Chucky Kim – guitar, percussion (2018)
- Abe Kim – drums, percussion (2017)

== Discography ==
=== Studio albums ===
Title	Details	Peak chart positions		
Title	Details	US	US Folk	US Indie
Run River North	Released: February 25, 2014; Label: Nettwerk; Format: CD, LP, digital download	196	6	36
Drinking from a Salt Pond	Released: February 26, 2016; Label: Nettwerk; Format: CD, LP, digital download	— (Note: Drinking from a Salt Pond did not enter the US Billboard 200, but peaked at number 8 on the US Heatseekers Albums Chart.)	10	50
Creatures In Your Head	Released: February 12, 2021; Label: Monster Calling Home / Create Music Group, Inc; Format: Digital download, streaming	—	—	—
Perfect	Released: July 12, 2025; Label: Warner Chappell Music; Format: Digital download, streaming	—	—	—

=== Extended plays ===
Title	Details
Superstitions EP	Released: January 27, 2017; Label: Nettwerk; Format: CD, digital download
Monsters Calling Home, Vol. 1	Released: May 3, 2019; Label: Nettwerk; Format: Digital download, streaming
Monsters Calling Home, Vol. 2	Released: November 1, 2019; Label: Nettwerk; Format: LP, digital download, streaming
MCH Vol. 1 + 2 = 3 (SAD Takes)	Released: April 10, 2020; Label: Nettwerk; Format: Digital download, streaming

=== Live Albums ===
Title	Details
Run River North on Audiotree Live	Released: June 5, 2019; Label: Audiotree; Format: Digital download, streaming
RRN LIVE (In the Year of Coronavirus) Ep. 1	Released: July 14, 2020; Label: Monster Calling Home; Format: Digital download, streaming
RRN LIVE (In the Year of Coronavirus) Ep. 2	Released: September 4, 2020; Label: Monster Calling Home; Format: Digital download, streaming
RRN LIVE (In the Year of Coronavirus) Ep. 3	Released: November 6, 2020; Label: Monster Calling Home; Format: Digital download, streaming
Run River North (Live in Los Angeles, CA 2020)	Released: March 26, 2021; Label: Jam in the Van; Format: Digital download, streaming

=== Singles ===
Title	Year	Peak chart positions		Album
Title	Year	US Alt.	BEL (FL) Tip	Album
"Fight to Keep"	2014	—	90	Run River North
"Excuses"	2014	—	—	Run River North
"Monsters Calling Home"	2014	—	—	Run River North
"Run or Hide"	2015	29	—	Drinking from a Salt Pond
"Pretender"	2016	—	—	Drinking from a Salt Pond
"29"	2016	—	—	Drinking from a Salt Pond
"The Girl"	2017	—	—	Non-album singles
"Funhouse"	2018	—	—	Non-album singles
"Hands Up"	2019	—	—	Monsters Calling Home, Vol. 1
"Rearview"	2019	—	—	Monsters Calling Home, Vol. 1
"40G"	2019	—	—	Monsters Calling Home, Vol. 1
"Casina"	2019	—	—	Monsters Calling Home, Vol. 1
"Wake Up"	2019	—	—	Monsters Calling Home, Vol. 2
"OK COOL"	2019	—	—	Monsters Calling Home, Vol. 2
"Spiders"	2020	—	—	Creatures In Your Head
"Pretty Lies"	2020	—	—	Creatures In Your Head
"Cemetery"	2020	—	—	Creatures In Your Head
"Hummingbird"	2020	—	—	Creatures In Your Head
"One For Me"	2020	—	—	Creatures In Your Head
"Lonely Weather"	2020	—	—	Creatures In Your Head
"Slow and Steady"	2021	—	—	Originally a non-album single, was later included in Perfect
"—" denotes single that did not chart or was not released

=== Music videos ===
Year	Title	Album
2012	"Growing Up"	Run River North
2014	"Fight To Keep"	Run River North
2014	"Excuses"	Run River North
2014	"Monsters Calling Home"	Run River North
2015	"Superstition"	Superstition
2015	"Run or Hide"	Drinking From a Salt Pond
2016	"Seven"	Superstition
2016	"Pretender"	Drinking From a Salt Pond
2016	"29"	Drinking From a Salt Pond
2018	"Funhouse"	Creatures In Your Head
2019	"Hands Up"	Monsters Calling Home, Vol. 1
2019	"Rearview"	Monsters Calling Home, Vol. 1
2019	"40G"	Monsters Calling Home, Vol. 1
2019	"Casina"	Monsters Calling Home, Vol. 1
2019	"Wake Up"	Monsters Calling Home, Vol. 2
2019	"Okay Cool"	Monsters Calling Home, Vol. 2
2020	"SPIDERS"	Creatures In Your Head
2020	"Pretty Lies"	Creatures In Your Head
2020	"Cemetery"	Creatures In Your Head
2020	"Hummingbird"	Creatures In Your Head
2020	"One For Me"	Creatures In Your Head
2020	"Lonely Weather (JJ Version)"	Creatures In Your Head
2021	"Lonely Weather"	Creatures In Your Head
