= Sugar Pine 7 =

American entertainment company

- Company type: Private
- Industry: Entertainment
- Founded: April 18, 2017; 9 years ago
- Founders: Steven Suptic; James DeAngelis; Clayton "Cib" James
- Headquarters: Los Angeles, California, U.S.
- Products: Alternative Lifestyle; Beyond the Pine; Lifestyle Classic (formerly); The Woods
- Members: 3 (January 2021)
- Parent: Rooster Teeth (2018–2019)

Sugar Pine 7 (abbreviated SP7) is an American production company and comedy troupe. The company was founded in 2017 by Steven Suptic, Clayton "Cib" James, and James DeAngelis; together, they operate a YouTube channel initially based on a vlog series created by Suptic. The channel hosted a mockumentary web series called Alternative Lifestyle, in which the three men play exaggerated versions of themselves.

As of October 2018, the channel had more than one million subscribers, and more than 114 million video views.

In January 2018 they became a part of Rooster Teeth's multi-channel network. In late May 2019, their involvement with Rooster Teeth was announced to be over. On June 2, 2019, Sugar Pine 7 released a video titled “Sugar Pine 7 is cancelled” and their regular uploads came to an end, with the exception of their weekly podcast.

== History ==
Steven Suptic met Clayton "Cib" James in 2012 and the two became friends. He later met James DeAngelis and editor Autumn Farrell while he was working at SourceFed. After SourceFed was cancelled in late March 2017, Suptic began a web series on his personal YouTube channel called Alternative Lifestyle, and subsequently co-founded Sugar Pine 7 with Clayton James and James DeAngelis, who had become regular cast members of the series. Regarding their style, Suptic has described Alternative Lifestyle as a "freeze-frame narrated, hyper-surrealistic, improv-based comedy that uses the vlog format as a vehicle to promote a character-driven story". The show follows something of a plot, a fictionalized take on Suptic's life after SourceFed. The name "Sugar Pine 7" refers to the name of the cabin the main group once stayed in. The first "season" of the series ended with a short film/sketch entitled "Akrasia."

Rapidly gaining popularity, the show is often described as a blend of scripted comedy bits and improvisation.

On September 26, 2017, Sugar Pine 7's Alternative Lifestyle won the Streamy Award for Show of the Year. In early November 2017 they released their first short film, entitled The Woods, to Rooster Teeth's RT First Subscription service. On October 31 of that year, they released the film for free on their YouTube Channel. Michael Duffin of The Triangle referred to the film as a "dark but fun and cheesy horror story." Kyle Kizu of The Daily Californian named Sugar Pine 7 "the pinnacle of YouTube content creation."

In early 2018, after working independently for several months, Sugar Pine 7 became a part of Rooster Teeth's multi-channel network called the Let's Play Network.

On January 24, 2019, Farrell announced she would be leaving Sugar Pine 7. She would leave to work for Rooster Teeth's Funhaus, and later lead the networks Inside Gaming revival.

== Members ==
=== Current members ===
- Clayton "Cib" James (founder)
- James DeAngelis (founder, cameraman)

=== Former members ===
- Steven Suptic (founder, editor)
- James Allen McCune (producer)
- Andrew Givler
- Jeremy Sauder
- Mimi Torres (producer)
- Vicky Pham (editor)
- Autumn Farrell (editor)
- Devin Parker (editor, cameraman)
- Parker Coppins (producer)
