= Another Century Records =

Alternative rock record label

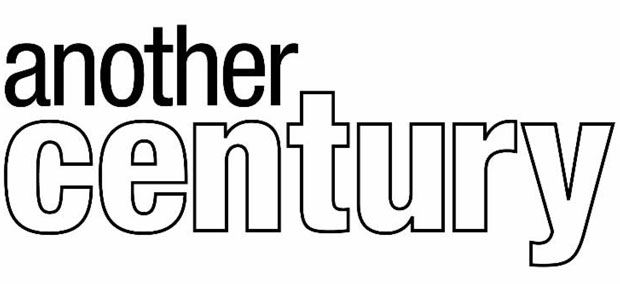
- Parent company: Sony Music Entertainment
- Founded: 2014
- Founder: Robert Kampf
- Status: Active
- Distributor: Sony Music Entertainment (worldwide)
- Genre: Alternative rock, indie rock
- Country of origin: Germany
- Location: Dortmund, Germany (headquarters)
- Official website: www.theorchard.com

Another Century Records is an alternative rock record label having offices in the United States, Germany, and London. It is an imprint of Century Media Records, which was formed in August 2015 by Sony Music Entertainment.

== Origins ==
Founded in late 2014 by Robert Kampf, Another Century differs from the heavy metal focus of its parent company, Century Media, by developing new artists. The label's goal is to become a premiere alternative rock label. Kampf, who started Century Media Records back in 1988, said in a statement that it's his “undying love for rock” that led to the formation of the new label, and he hopes to "develop and break the best bands in rock."

== Artists ==
Artists signed to the label include lovelytheband, Twin XL, Little Hurt, Radkey, Irontom, The Unlikely Candidates, Pretty, The Wrecks, Awkward, The Fame Riot, The Haxans, New Years Day, Stitched Up Heart, and Gemini Syndrome.
