= Atreyu discography =

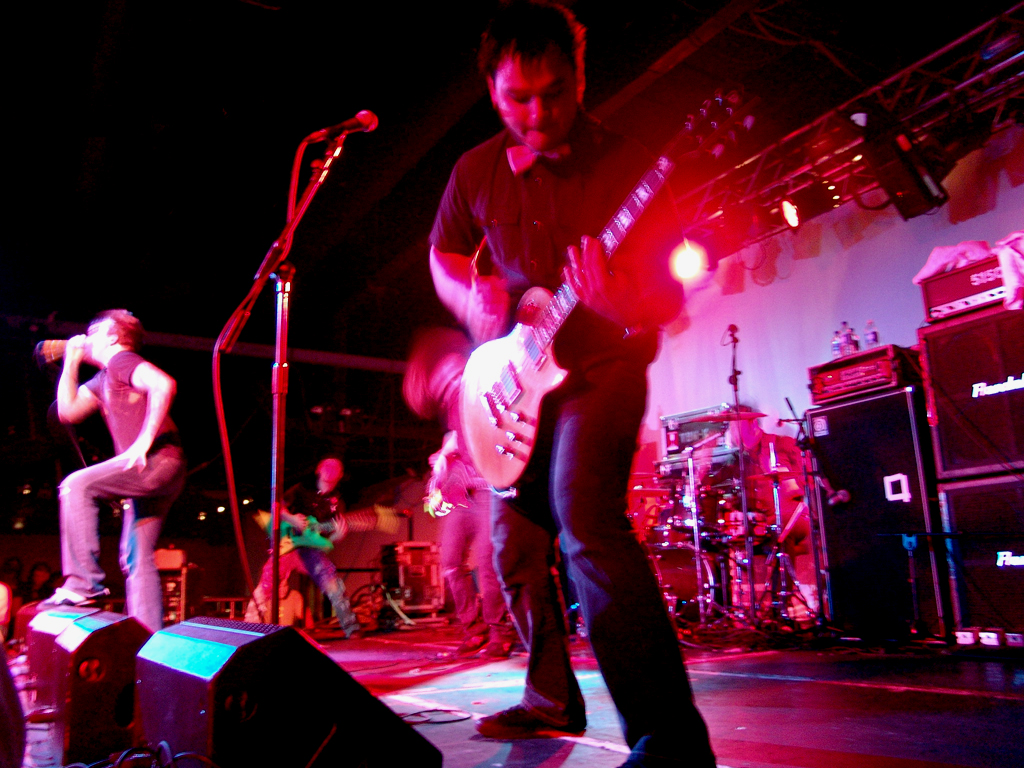
- Studio albums: 10
- Extended plays: 6
- Compilation albums: 2
- Singles: 36
- Music videos: 37
- Promotional singles: 5

The discography of Atreyu, an American rock band, consists of ten studio albums, two compilation album, six extended plays, thirty-six singles, five promotional single and thirty-seven music videos.

== Albums ==
=== Studio albums ===
List of studio albums, with selected chart positions
Title	Album details	Peak chart positions						Certifications
Title	Album details	US	US Hard Rock	US Rock	AUS	CAN	UK	Certifications
Suicide Notes and Butterfly Kisses	Released: June 4, 2002 (US); Label: Victory; Formats: CD, LP, digital download	—	—	—	—	—	—	
The Curse	Released: June 29, 2004 (US); Label: Victory; Formats: CD, LP, digital download	32	—	—	—	—	—	RIAA: Gold
A Death-Grip on Yesterday	Released: March 28, 2006 (US); Label: Victory; Formats: CD, LP, digital download	9	—	—	49	—	92	
Lead Sails Paper Anchor	Released: August 28, 2007 (US); Label: Hollywood; Formats: CD, LP, digital download	8	1	1	38	—	61	RIAA: Gold
Congregation of the Damned	Released: October 27, 2009 (US); Label: Hollywood; Formats: CD, LP, digital download	18	4	8	39	22	116	
Long Live	Released: September 18, 2015 (US); Label: Spinefarm; Formats: CD, LP, digital download	26	4	9	29	17	96	
In Our Wake	Released: October 12, 2018; Label: Spinefarm; Formats: CD, digital download	72	2	9	—	91	—	
Baptize	Released: June 4, 2021; Label: Spinefarm; Formats: CD, digital download	—	21	—	—	—	—	
The Beautiful Dark of Life	Released: December 8, 2023; Label: Spinefarm; Formats: CD, LP, digital download	—	—	—	—	—	—	
The End Is Not the End	Released: April 24, 2026; Label: Spinefarm; Formats: CD, LP, digital download	—	—	—	—	—	—	
"—" denotes a recording that did not chart or was not released in that territory.

=== Compilation albums ===
List of compilation albums, with selected chart positions
Title	Album details	Peak chart positions
Title	Album details	US
The Best Of... Atreyu	Released: January 23, 2007 (US); Label: Victory; Formats: CD, digital download	103
The Pronoia Sessions	Released: October 25, 2024 (US); Label: Spinefarm; Formats: CD, digital download, Vinyl	—

== Extended plays ==
List of extended plays
Title	Details
Visions	Released: 1999 (US); Label: Die Trying; Formats: CD, cassette
Fractures in the Facade of Your Porcelain Beauty	Released: November 20, 2001 (US); Label: Tribunal; Formats: CD, digital download
Covers of the Damned	Released: October 12, 2010 (US); Label: Hollywood; Formats: CD, digital download
The Hope of a Spark	Released: April 14, 2023; Label: Spinefarm; Formats: CD, digital download
The Moment You Find Your Flame	Released: August 18, 2023; Label: Spinefarm; Formats: CD, digital download
A Torch in the Dark	Released: November 3, 2023; Label: Spinefarm; Formats: CD, digital download

== Singles ==
List of singles, with selected chart positions, showing year released and album name
Title	Year	Peak chart positions				Certifications	Album
Title	Year	US	US Alt.	US Main. Rock	US Rock	Certifications	Album
"Ain't Love Grand"	2002	—	—	—	—		Suicide Notes and Butterfly Kisses
"Lip Gloss and Black"	2002	—	—	—	—		Suicide Notes and Butterfly Kisses
"Bleeding Mascara"	2004	—	—	—	— (Note: "Right Side of the Bed" did not enter the Hot Rock & Alternative Songs chart, but peaked at number 40 on the Active Rock chart.)		The Curse
"Right Side of the Bed"	2004	—	—	—	— (Note: "Right Side of the Bed" did not enter the Hot Rock & Alternative Songs chart, but peaked at number 40 on the Active Rock chart.)		The Curse
"The Crimson"	2005	—	—	—	—		The Curse
"You Give Love a Bad Name"	2005	—	—	—	—		Mr. & Mrs. Smith – Original Motion Picture Soundtrack
"Her Portrait in Black"	2006	—	—	—	—		Underworld: Evolution – Original Motion Picture Soundtrack
"Ex's and Oh's"	2006	—	—	24	— (Note: "Ex's and Oh's" did not enter the Hot Rock & Alternative Songs chart, but peaked at number 22 on the Active Rock chart.)		A Death-Grip on Yesterday
"The Theft"	2006	—	—	—	— (Note: "The Theft" did not enter the Hot Rock & Alternative Songs chart, but peaked at number 39 on the Active Rock chart.)		A Death-Grip on Yesterday
"Shameful"	2006	—	—	—	—		A Death-Grip on Yesterday
"Becoming the Bull"	2007	— (Note: "Becoming the Bull" did not enter the Billboard Hot 100, but peaked at number 19 on the Bubbling Under Hot 100 Singles chart.)	11	5	— (Note: "Becoming the Bull" did not enter the Hot Rock & Alternative Songs chart, but peaked at number 4 on the Active Rock chart.)	RIAA: Gold	Lead Sails Paper Anchor
"Doomsday"	2007	—	—	—	—		Lead Sails Paper Anchor
"Falling Down"	2008	— (Note: "Falling Down" did not enter the Billboard Hot 100, but peaked at number 15 on the Bubbling Under Hot 100 Singles chart.)	3	5	— (Note: "Falling Down" did not enter the Hot Rock & Alternative Songs chart, but peaked at number 4 on the Active Rock chart.)	RIAA: Gold	Lead Sails Paper Anchor
"Slow Burn"	2008	—	16	16	— (Note: "Slow Burn" did not enter the Hot Rock & Alternative Songs chart, but peaked at number 14 on the Active Rock chart.)		Lead Sails Paper Anchor
"Storm to Pass"	2009	—	40	20	36		Congregation of the Damned
"Lonely"	2010	—	—	—	—		Congregation of the Damned
"Gallows"	2010	—	—	—	—		Congregation of the Damned
"So Others May Live"	2015	—	—	—	—		Non-album single
"Long Live"	2015	—	—	—	—		Long Live
"Do You Know Who You Are?"	2015	—	—	30	—		Long Live
"In Our Wake"	2018	—	—	—	—		In Our Wake
"The Time Is Now"	2018	—	—	15	— (Note: "The Time Is Now" did not enter the Hot Rock Songs chart, but peaked at number 43 on the Rock Airplay chart.)		In Our Wake
"House of Gold"	2019	—	—	26	—		In Our Wake
"Battle Drums" (with Kayzo)	2020	—	—	—	—		Non-album single
"Save Us"	2020	—	—	35	—		Baptize
"Warrior" (featuring Travis Barker)	2021	—	—	8	—		Baptize
"Underrated"	2021	—	—	—	—		Baptize
"Catastrophe"	2021	—	—	—	—		Baptize
"Untouchable" (featuring Jacoby Shaddix)	2021	—	—	22	—		Baptize
"Drowning"	2023	—	—	—	—		The Beautiful Dark of Life
"Watch Me Burn"	2023	—	—	17	—		The Beautiful Dark of Life
"Gone"	2023	—	—	5	—		The Beautiful Dark of Life
"Immortal"	2023	—	—	—	—		The Beautiful Dark of Life
"(i)"	2023	—	—	—	—		The Beautiful Dark of Life
"Come Down"	2023	—	—	—	—		The Beautiful Dark of Life
"Like a Stone" (Audioslave cover)	2024	—	—	—	—		The Pronoia Sessions
"Mary Jane's Last Dance" (Tom Petty and the Heartbreakers cover)	2024	—	—	—	—		The Pronoia Sessions
"Dead"	2025	—	—	—	—		The End is Not the End
"Ego Death"	2026	—	—	—	—		The End is Not the End
"All For You"	2026	—	—	11	—		The End is Not the End
"—" denotes a recording that did not chart or was not released in that territory.

=== Promotional singles ===
List of promotional singles, showing year released and album name
Title	Year	Album
"Stop! Before It's Too Late and We've Destroyed It All"	2009	Congregation of the Damned
"Honor"	2010	Lead Sails Paper Anchor
"Start to Break"	2015	Long Live
"A Bitter Broken Memory"	2016	Long Live
"Anger Left Behind"	2018	In Our Wake
"Children of Light" (feat. Max Cavalera)	2026	The End Is Not the End

== Music videos ==
List of music videos, showing year released and director
Title	Year	Director(s)
"Ain't Love Grand"	2002	Darren Doane
"Lip Gloss and Black"	2003	Sean Stiegemeier
"Right Side of the Bed"	2004	Scott Kalvert
"The Crimson"	2005	Sean Stiegmeier
"Her Portrait in Black"	2006	Rob Schroeder
"Ex's and Oh's"	2006	Jay Martin
"The Theft"	2006	Sean Stiegemeier
"Becoming the Bull"	2007	Kevin Kerslake
"Doomsday"	2008	Unknown
"Falling Down"	2008	Sean Stiegemeier
"Storm to Pass"	2009	Sean Stiegemeier
"Lonely"	2010	Sean Stiegemeier
"Gallows"	2010	Unknown
"So Others May Live"	2015	Unknown
"Long Live"	2015	Porter McKnight
"Do You Know Who You Are?"	2015	Porter McKnight
"In Our Wake"	2018	Sean Stiegemeier
"The Time Is Now"	2018	Loïc Foulon
"House of Gold"	2019	Monte Legaspi
"Generation"	2019	Porter McKnight & Brandon Saller
"Super Hero" (featuring Aaron Gillespie and M. Shadows)	2020	Anthony Tran
"Save Us"	2020	Unknown
"Warrior" (featuring Travis Barker)	2021	Mait Hudson and Jacob Boyles
"Underrated"	2021	Tony Carrasco
"Catastrophe"	2021	Unknown
"Baptize"	2021	Unknown
"Drowning"	2023	J.T. Ibanez
"Watch Me Burn"	2023	Aaran McKenzie
"God/Devil"	2023	Porter McKnight & Brandon Saller
"Capital F"	2023	Christian Lawrence
"Immortal"	2023	J.T. Ibanez
"Forevermore"	2023	Unknown
"Come Down"	2023	J.T. Ibanez
"Insomnia"	2024	J.T. Ibanez
"Dancing with My Demons"	2024	J.T. Ibanez
"Like a Stone"	2024	Porter McKnight
"Mary Jane's Last Dance"	2024	Porter McKnight
"Dead"	2025	Sean Stiegemeier
"Ego Death"	2026	Sean Stiegemeier
"All For You"	2026	Sean Stiegemeier
