= The Best Of... Atreyu =

Compilation album by Atreyu
- Released: January 23, 2007
- Genre: Metalcore
- Length: 60:09
- Label: Victory
- Producers: Josh Abraham, Atreyu, GGGarth, Eric Rachel

Atreyu chronology
A Death-Grip on Yesterday (2006)	The Best Of... Atreyu (2007)	Lead Sails Paper Anchor (2007)

The Best Of... Atreyu is the first compilation album by American rock band Atreyu. It is band's final release on Victory Records, after being signed to Hollywood Records in 2006. The collection takes songs from the band's first 3 albums. It was released on January 23, 2007. It is a CD/DVD combo. It also comes with a Victory records sample CD.

Professional ratings
Review scores
Source	Rating
Allmusic	4/5 stars
Punknews.org	2.5/4 stars
Punktastic	1/5 stars

== Track listing ==
CD
No.	Title	Album	Length
1.	"Lip Gloss and Black"	Suicide Notes and Butterfly Kisses	5:04
2.	"Ain't Love Grand"	Suicide Notes and Butterfly Kisses	3:43
3.	"Living Each Day Like You're Already Dead"	Suicide Notes and Butterfly Kisses	2:45
4.	"A Song for the Optimists"	Suicide Notes and Butterfly Kisses	4:39
5.	"Deanne the Arsonist"	Suicide Notes and Butterfly Kisses	3:42
6.	"Tulips Are Better"	Suicide Notes and Butterfly Kisses	3:32
7.	"Someone's Standing on My Chest"	Suicide Notes and Butterfly Kisses	4:09
8.	"Bleeding Mascara"	The Curse	2:26
9.	"Right Side of the Bed"	The Curse	3:42
10.	"You Eclipsed by Me"	The Curse	3:39
11.	"The Crimson"	The Curse	4:02
12.	"Demonology and Heartache"	The Curse	3:42
13.	"My Sanity on the Funeral Pyre"	The Curse	3:40
14.	"Creature"	A Death-Grip on Yesterday	2:59
15.	"Untitled Finale"	A Death-Grip on Yesterday	5:16
16.	"Ex's and Oh's"	A Death-Grip on Yesterday	3:31
17.	"Shameful"	A Death-Grip on Yesterday	3:29
18.	"The Theft"	A Death-Grip on Yesterday	3:58

- On some copies of this CD, the song "Untitled Finale" is replaced by "Our Sick Story (Thus Far)" and "Shameful" is replaced by "Untitled Finale".

=== DVD ===
1. "Ain't Love Grand" – music video
2. "Lip Gloss & Black" – music video
3. "Right Side of the Bed" – music video
4. "The Crimson" – music video
5. "Ex's & Oh's" – music video
6. "The Theft" – music video

There is also bonus content on the DVD featuring music videos from other artists on Victory Records.

== Charts ==
Chart performance
Chart (2007)	Peak position
Canadian Albums (Nielsen SoundScan)	157
UK Independent Albums (Official Charts)	10
UK Rock & Metal Albums (Official Charts)	7
US Billboard 200	103
US Independent Albums (Billboard)	6
