= Baptize (album) =

Studio album by Atreyu
- Released: June 4, 2021
- Genres: Hard rock; arena rock; pop metal
- Length: 41:16
- Label: Spinefarm
- Producer: John Feldmann

Atreyu chronology
In Our Wake (2018)	Baptize (2021)	The Beautiful Dark of Life (2023)

Singles from Baptize
- 1. "Save Us" Released: October 16, 2020; 2. "Warrior" Released: March 4, 2021; 3. "Underrated" Released: March 4, 2021; 4. "Catastrophe" Released: May 4, 2021

Baptize is the eighth studio album by American rock band Atreyu. It was released on June 4, 2021, through Spinefarm Records and was produced by John Feldmann. It is the first album not to feature vocalist and founding member Alex Varkatzas who left the band in September 2020 although he is credited on the album for song writing and lyrics as he worked on it shortly before being removed from the band, and the first to feature Kyle Rosa on drums. The album received polarized reviews from music critics, with praise going towards the ambition, but criticism primarily going to lack of focus and consistency.

== Background and promotion ==
In late August 2020, it was rumored that vocalist Alex Varkatzas had left the band. After some uncertainty following these reports, the band officially announced that they were parting ways with Varkatzas a month later on September 30. On October 16, the band officially released the new single "Save Us" along with its music video.

On March 4, 2021, the band released two singles, "Warrior" featuring Blink-182 drummer Travis Barker and "Underrated" along with two corresponding music videos. At the same time, the band announced the album itself, the album cover, the track list, and release date. On May 4, one month before the album release, the band released the fourth single "Catastrophe". A week later, they also unveiled the music video for the song.

== Critical reception ==
Professional ratings
Aggregate scores
Source	Rating
Metacritic	51/100
Review scores
Source	Rating
AllMusic	3/5 stars
Dead Press!	6/10
Distorted Sound	5/10
Exclaim!	4/10
Kerrang!	2/5 stars
Louder Sound	3/5 stars
Metal.de	9/10
Themusic.com.au	1.5/5 stars
Wall of Sound	9/10

The album received mixed to negative reviews from critics. At Metacritic, which assigns a normalised rating out of 100 to reviews from mainstream critics, the album has an average score of 51 out of 100 based on 4 reviews, indicating "mixed or average reviews". AllMusic gave the album a positive review but saying, "If the slickness of its predecessor was a turn-off for longtime fans, then Baptize is sure to disappoint, as it plays out like a sizzle reel for modern rock production. The playing is strong throughout, but Feldmann's fondness for boa constrictor-like compression renders the album as a whole strangely inert." Dead Press! rated the album positively, stating: "Whilst Baptize is somewhat of a gamble for the Californians, Atreyu show a willingness to evolve their sound yet again. Granted, the record as a whole could have had a better impact if presented as a shorter collection of songs, but there are still standout moments to enjoy." Distorted Sound scored the album 5 out of 10 and said: "ATREYU never try to hide the band they want to be. This isn't a metalcore record that flirts with rock. In fact, if anything, it's the opposite. Credit where it's due: they haven't gone half hearted on this new musical stance. However, this watered down, semi credible iteration of the Californians becomes tiresome quickly. Baptize offers an occasional chorus hook or slick solo – and very little else." Owen Morawitz of Exclaim! rated the album 4 out of 10 and said: "Baptize has all the lasting impact of a post-energy drink buzz, sounding about as unique and memorable as the rumbling static from a festival side stage you passed over in favour of the headliner. It's clear Atreyu crave rebirth in the crucible of lifeless arena rock, but with a selection of tracks this dull and inoffensive, they'll probably get their wish. That may sound cocky, but I don't care."

Kerrang! gave the album 2 out of 5 and considered the release to be "...an album striving to do so much, and be so much, in search of fundamental difference. And in spreading itself so thin in the name of newness, Baptize sadly sells itself (and its creators) short." Louder Sound gave the album a positive review, but stated that is "...like an adrenaline rush that wears off quickly." Alex Sievers from Themusic.com.au gave the album 1.5 out of 5 and said: "When I listen to Baptize, I see it for what it is. A transparent attempt to desperately stay relevant that doesn't know what it wants to be. It doesn't once feel authentic, just cynical and calculated. Like the band are trying their hardest to acquire sync deals in radio, ads, and most likely, sports. I can see certain songs getting flogged during the next NBA or NFL seasons, or even during the current AFL season here in Australia. To Atreyu, get that cheddar; you do you. The band clearly want to grow in listenership and popularity, and this album reflects that by hopping into some new sounds and aiming to fill arenas. Yet these 'experimentations' are never interesting, and the songwriting is so played out. The band's mixture of pop, electronic, rock and metalcore doesn't pan out well over these 15 songs. I loved Atreyu – Suicide Notes and Butterfly Kisses, A Death-Grip on Yesterday and Congregation of the Damned forever – but Baptize is just so disenchanting. I knew what I was getting, expected little of it going in but was hoping to be surprised, and ended up with even less." Wall of Sound gave the album almost a perfect score 9/10 and saying: "Atreyu have cemented themselves as an overarching post-hardcore/metalcore god over the last twenty or so years. On Baptize they're feeding off the best aspects of their earlier records and essentially creating a byproduct of that. This album is still Atreyu being true to their core, while hinting at a style they feel comfortable with performing today. I honestly believe this is the band's best work in a long time, and will be enjoyed by fans, new and old."

== Track listing ==
Baptize track listing
No.	Title	Writer(s)	Length
1.	"Strange Powers of Prophecy"	Atreyu; John Feldmann	1:03
2.	"Baptize"	Atreyu; Feldmann; Joe Kirkland; Alex Varkatzas	2:49
3.	"Save Us"	Atreyu; Feldmann; Jordan Benjamin; Kevin Hissink; Varkatzas	2:21
4.	"Underrated"	Atreyu; Feldmann	3:00
5.	"Broken Again"	Atreyu; Feldmann; Varkatzas	2:35
6.	"Weed"	Atreyu; Feldmann	2:17
7.	"Dead Weight"	Atreyu; Feldmann; David Hodges; Mark Hoppus; Varkatzas	3:14
8.	"Catastrophe"	Atreyu; Feldmann	2:44
9.	"Fucked Up"	Atreyu; Feldmann; Varkatzas	2:45
10.	"Sabotage Me"	Atreyu; Feldmann; Hoppus; Varkatzas	2:45
11.	"Untouchable" (featuring Jacoby Shaddix)	Atreyu; Feldmann; Nick Anderson; Varkatzas	3:05
12.	"No Matter What"	Atreyu; Feldmann; Kirkland; Varkatzas	3:48
13.	"Oblivion" (featuring Matt Heafy)	Atreyu; Feldmann; Varkatzas	2:57
14.	"Stay"	Atreyu; Feldmann; Nick Furlong; Varkatzas	3:01
15.	"Warrior" (featuring Travis Barker)	Atreyu; Feldmann; Travis Barker; Varkatzas	2:45
Total length:			41:16

== Personnel ==
Atreyu

- Brandon Saller – clean vocals, additional guitars, keyboards, piano, programming
- Dan Jacobs – lead guitar, backing vocals
- Travis Miguel – rhythm guitar, backing vocals
- Marc "Porter" McKnight – bass, unclean vocals
- Kyle Rosa – drums, backing vocals

Additional musicians

- Jacoby Shaddix – guest vocals on track 11
- Matt Heafy – guest vocals on track 13
- Travis Barker – additional drums on track 15
- Alex Varkatzas – additional lyrics, song writing

Additional personnel

- John Feldmann – production, engineering, recording
