= Slow Burn (Atreyu song) =

Single by Atreyu

from the album Lead Sails Paper Anchor
- Released: June 17, 2008
- Recorded: 2007
- Genre: Post-hardcore, alternative metal
- Label: Hollywood
- Songwriter(s): Dan Jacobs, Marc McKnight, Travis Miguel, Brandon Saller, Alex Varkatzas
- Producer(s): John Feldmann

Atreyu singles chronology
"Falling Down" (2008)	"Slow Burn" (2008)	"Storm To Pass" (2009)

"Slow Burn" is the fourth and final single from Atreyu's fourth album Lead Sails Paper Anchor. Due to "Doomsday" only being released in the UK, it is known as their third US single.

== Music video ==
Atreyu held a contest on YouTube, for the winner to star in the "Slow Burn" music Video. The contestants were required to lip-sync part 1, 2, or 3 of the song. The contest began on June 27, 2008, and ended on July 13, 2008.

== Chart performance ==
The single has so far peaked at #16 on the Hot Mainstream Rock Tracks and #16 on the Hot Modern Rock Tracks. This is Atreyu's fourth single to chart on the Billboard Mainstream rock chart, and third to chart on Billboard Modern rock chart.
