= Becoming the Bull =

Single by Atreyu

from the album Lead Sails Paper Anchor
- Released: July 24, 2007
- Recorded: Mid Early 2006
- Genre: Alternative metal; melodic metalcore
- Length: 3:45
- Label: Hollywood
- Songwriters: Dan Jacobs, Marc McKnight, Travis Miguel, Brandon Saller, Alex Varkatzas
- Producer: John Feldmann

Atreyu singles chronology
"The Theft" (2006)	"Becoming the Bull" (2007)	"Doomsday" (2007)

Music video
- "Becoming the Bull" on YouTube

″Becoming the Bull″ is the 4th track and first single on Atreyu's 4th album Lead Sails Paper Anchor. It is their second highest-charted single to date on Modern Rock Format (#5 on the Mainstream Rock Chart and #11 on the Modern Rock Chart), surpassing Ex's and Oh's. Additionally, the song was featured in the EA Sports American football video game Madden NFL 08, where it was incorrectly listed as being called "Becoming".

The band shot the video with acclaimed director Kevin Kerslake. The video was released on MySpace Music on August 16, 2007. The song itself was used to promote UFC commercials on Spike.

== Background ==
The song has been released by Atreyu in a computer game where players have 20 sound clips and must put them in order in the fastest time. Atreyu made the game a contest where the contestant with the fastest time by August 6, 2007, would win a signed guitar, a phone call from the band, a copy of the CD before it was in stores, and a free membership to Atreyu's exclusive fan club. The top 10 runners-up were given a copy of the CD before it was in stores, and a free membership to Atreyu's exclusive fan club.

== Track listing ==
1. "Becoming the Bull"
2. "Can't Happen Here (Demo)"

== Charts ==
=== Weekly charts ===
Weekly chart performance for "Becoming the Bull"
Chart (2007–2008)	Peak position
US Alternative Airplay (Billboard)	11
US Mainstream Rock (Billboard)	5

=== Year-end charts ===
Year-end chart performance for "Becoming the Bull"
Chart (2008)	Position
US Mainstream Rock Songs (Billboard)	38

== Certifications ==
Certifications for "Becoming the Bull"
Region	Certification	Certified units/sales
United States (RIAA)	Gold	500,000^{‡}
^{‡} Sales+streaming figures based on certification alone.
