= Falling Down (Atreyu song) =

Single by Atreyu

from the album Lead Sails Paper Anchor
- Released: January 29, 2008
- Genre: Hard rock, pop punk, alternative rock
- Length: 2:59
- Label: Hollywood
- Songwriters: Dan Jacobs, Marc McKnight, Travis Miguel, Brandon Saller, Alex Varkatzas
- Producer: John Feldmann

Atreyu singles chronology
"Doomsday" (2007)	"Falling Down" (2008)	"Slow Burn" (2008)

Music video
- "Falling Down" on YouTube

"Falling Down" is the third track and single from Atreyu's fourth album Lead Sails Paper Anchor. Due to "Doomsday" only being released in the UK, it is known as their second US single. Unlike most of Atreyu's music, which features primarily a metalcore style, "Falling Down" features a style reminiscent of pop punk. The song was featured on the music video game, Guitar Hero On Tour: Modern Hits.

"Falling Down" peaked at No. 3 on Billboard's Alternative Songs chart and No. 5 on Billboard's Mainstream Rock Songs chart.

== Music video ==
The Atreyu music video for "Falling Down" (directed by Sean Stiegemeier) is a narrative-driven homage to Francis Ford Coppola's 1983 classic film The Outsiders. It features the band members and their producer, John Feldmann, acting as 1950s-era greasers and staging mud-fight scenes at night.

== Charts ==
=== Weekly charts ===
Weekly chart performance for "Falling Down"
Chart (2008)	Peak position
US Alternative Airplay (Billboard)	3
US Mainstream Rock (Billboard)	5

=== Year-end charts ===
Year-end chart performance for "Falling Down"
Chart (2008)	Position
US Alternative Airplay (Billboard)	27
US Mainstream Rock (Billboard)	27

== Certifications ==
Certifications for "Falling Down
Region	Certification	Certified units/sales
United States (RIAA)	Gold	500,000^{‡}
^{‡} Sales+streaming figures based on certification alone.
