= Long Live =

Long Live may refer to:

- Vive, viva, and vivat, interjections used in the Romance languages usually translated to English as "long live"

== Music ==
- Long Live (Atreyu album) and song of the same name.
- Long Live (The Chariot album)
- "Long Live" (Taylor Swift song)
- "Long Live" (Florida Georgia Line song)

== See also ==
- Pallandu Vazhga (Live Long), a 1975 Indian Tamil-language film
- Palaandu Vaazhga, an Indian Tamil-language film
