= CDVU+ =

Type of enhanced CD released by The Walt Disney Company

CDVU+ (CD-View-Plus)
- Media type: Mixed Mode CD
- Encoding: Various
- Developed by: The Walt Disney Company
- Usage: Audio, Video and multimedia data storage
- Extended from: Compact Disc

CDVU+ (pronounced "CD View Plus") is a type of enhanced CD that was released by The Walt Disney Company beginning in 2007. It was essentially a revamped version of the Compact Disc (CD), and includes multimedia "Extras" on the disc. New features such as "digital magazine extras" like band photos, interviews, lyrics, and exclusive photos could be accessed by inserting the disc into a computer.

== Announced CDVU+ releases ==
- Jonas Brothers - Jonas Brothers, A Little Bit Longer, Lines, Vines and Trying Times
- Jesse McCartney - Departure
- The Cheetah Girls - The Cheetah Girls One World
- Plain White T's - Every Second Counts, Big Bad World
- Atreyu - Lead Sails Paper Anchor 2.0
- Demi Lovato - Don't Forget, Here We Go Again

== Cancelled CDVU+ releases ==
- Hilary Duff - Dignity (re-release)
