= Ain't Love Grand =

Ain't Love Grand may refer to:

- Ain't Love Grand!, a 1985 album by X
- "Ain't Love Grand" (song), a 2002 song by Atreyu
