= In Our Wake =

Studio album by Atreyu
- Released: October 12, 2018
- Genres: Alternative metal; melodic metalcore
- Length: 44:19
- Label: Spinefarm
- Producer: John Feldmann

Atreyu chronology
Long Live (2015)	In Our Wake (2018)	Baptize (2021)

Singles from In Our Wake
- 1. "In Our Wake" Released: August 17, 2018; 2. "The Time Is Now" Released: September 12, 2018; 3. "House of Gold" Released: April 4, 2019

In Our Wake is the seventh studio album by American rock band Atreyu. It was released on October 12, 2018, through Spinefarm. It is the final album to feature vocalist and founding member Alex Varkatzas before his departure from the band in September 2020.

== Track listing ==
All tracks are written by Atreyu and John Feldmann, except where noted.

No.	Title	Writer(s)	Length
1.	"In Our Wake"		3:13
2.	"House of Gold"		3:58
3.	"The Time Is Now"		3:19
4.	"Nothing Will Ever Change"		3:55
5.	"Blind, Deaf, and Dumb"		3:08
6.	"Terrified"		4:09
7.	"Safety Pin"		3:09
8.	"Into the Open"		3:58
9.	"Paper Castle"		3:01
10.	"No Control"		3:38
11.	"Anger Left Behind"		3:23
12.	"Super Hero" (featuring Aaron Gillespie and M. Shadows)	Atreyu; Feldmann; Matt Sanders; Aaron Gillespie	6:25
Total length:			44:19

Target edition
No.	Title	Length
13.	"Generation"	2:28
14.	"Straight to Hell"	3:52
Total length:		51:30

Deluxe edition
No.	Title	Writer(s)	Length
13.	"In Our Wake" (acoustic)		3:50
14.	"The Time Is Now" (alternate)		3:36
15.	"Generation"		2:26
16.	"Straight to Hell"		3:50
17.	"So Others May Live"	Atreyu	4:20
18.	"Stronger Than Me"	Atreyu	3:13
19.	"When the Day Is Done"	Atreyu	4:23
Total length:			69:57

*"So Others May Live" and "Stronger Than Me" are from the Target edition of Long Live.

*"When the Day Is Done" is from the Best Buy edition of Long Live.

*According to a studio video from Atreyu's YouTube page, "Into the Open" was originally going to be titled "Out in the Open".

== Personnel ==
Credits adapted from Tidal.

Atreyu

- Alex Varkatzas – lead vocals
- Dan Jacobs – guitar
- Travis Miguel – guitar
- Porter McKnight – bass
- Brandon Saller – drums, clean vocals

Additional personnel

- John Feldmann – production, mixing, engineering
- Dylan McLean – mixing, engineering
- Jon Lundin – mixing, engineering
- Zakk Cervini – mixing, engineering
- Ted Jensen – mastering
- Matt Malpass – engineering
- Sean Stiegemeier – photography
- Porter McKnight – art direction, design, photo editing

== Charts ==
Chart (2018)	Peak position
Australian Digital Albums (ARIA)	18
Canadian Albums (Billboard)	91
US Billboard 200	72
US Top Hard Rock Albums (Billboard)	2
US Top Rock Albums (Billboard)	9
