= Ex's and Oh's (Atreyu song) =

Single by Atreyu

from the album A Death-Grip on Yesterday
- Released: March 13, 2006
- Genre: Melodic metalcore; post-hardcore
- Length: 3:31
- Label: Victory
- Songwriters: Dan Jacobs, Marc McKnight, Travis Miguel, Brandon Saller, Alex Varkatzas
- Producer: Josh Abraham/Atreyu

Atreyu singles chronology
"Her Portrait in Black" (2006)	"Ex's and Oh's" (2006)	"The Theft" (2006)

"Ex's and Oh's" is the lead single from American rock band Atreyu's third album, A Death-Grip on Yesterday, entering Billboard's Active Rock chart on March 18, 2006. It is Atreyu's second single from 2006, but the first from the album, as "Her Portrait in Black" was also released, which was created for the soundtrack to Underworld: Evolution. The lyrics deal with a period of alcohol addiction of vocalist Alex Varkatzas. This song is included on the video game Madden NFL 07 (however, it is edited). It is also a master recording playable on Guitar Hero II as an Xbox 360 downloadable track.

The song peaked on the Billboard Hot Mainstream Rock Tracks chart at number 24 in June 2006. It is one of Atreyu's most famous songs, and is a staple of their live sets. Varkatzas often encourages audience participation when performing the song.

An instrumental version was heard in the Universal Technical Institute vignette that aired during Nitro Circus Live on MTV2.

The song was featured in the beginning of the eighth episode of the first season of Jersey Shore, "One Shot".

== Track listing ==
No.	Title	Length
1.	"Ex's and Oh's" (radio edit)	3:20
