= Covers of the Damned =

EP of cover songs by Atreyu
- Released: October 12, 2010
- Recorded: 2010
- Genres: Alternative metal; hard rock
- Length: 20:34
- Label: Hollywood

Atreyu chronology
Congregation of the Damned (2009)	Covers of the Damned (2010)	Long Live (2015)

Covers of the Damned is the third EP by American rock band Atreyu. It is for the band's Congregation of the Damned Tour, in support of their fifth album, Congregation of the Damned. The performers were a collaboration of Atreyu, along with their tourmates Blessthefall, Chiodos, Endless Hallway and Architects. Two songs were performed by Atreyu alone, one was by Endless Hallway featuring Travis Miguel of Atreyu, and the last two were a collaboration of certain members from each band.

Professional ratings
Review scores
Source	Rating
Alternative Press	Positive

== Track listing ==
No.	Title	Writer(s)	Performer(s)	Length
1.	"Livin' on the Edge" (Aerosmith, 1993)	Steven Tyler; Joe Perry; Mark Hudson	Atreyu	5:46
2.	"Holiday in Cambodia" (Dead Kennedys, 1980)	Jello Biafra; John Greenway	Endless Hallway feat. Travis Miguel	3:46
3.	"Guitar Gangsters & Cadillac Blood" (Volbeat, 2008)	Michael Poulsen	Atreyu	3:00
4.	"The Boys Are Back in Town" (Thin Lizzy, 1976)	Phil Lynott	Various: Alex Varkatzas – vocals; Sam Carter – vocals; Brandon Bolmer – vocals; Beau Bokan – vocals; Dan Jacobs – guitar; Travis Miguel – guitar; Evan McCarthy – bass; Joe Mullen – drums	4:29
5.	"My Own Summer (Shove It)" (Deftones, 1997)	Chino Moreno; Stephen Carpenter; Chi Cheng; Abe Cunningham	Various: Brandon Bolmer – vocals; Sam Carter – vocals; Jono Evans – guitar; Travis Miguel – guitar; Marc McKnight – bass; Tanner Wayne – drums	3:34
Total length:				20:34

== Personnel ==
Atreyu

- Alex Varkatzas – vocals
- Dan Jacobs – guitar
- Travis Miguel – guitar, additional guitar on track 2
- Marc "Porter" McKnight – bass
- Brandon Saller – drums, co-lead vocals

Endless Hallway

- Ryan Jackson – vocals
- Jono Evans – guitars
- Micheal Tye – guitars
- Evan McCarthy – bass
- Joe Mullen – drums
