= The Beautiful Dark of Life =

Studio album by Atreyu
- Released: December 8, 2023
- Genres: Alternative metal; metalcore
- Length: 50:00
- Label: Spinefarm
- Producer: John Feldmann

Atreyu chronology
Baptize (2021)	The Beautiful Dark of Life (2023)	The End Is Not the End (2026)

Singles from The Beautiful Dark of Life
- 1. "Drowning" Released: January 30, 2023; 2. "Watch Me Burn" Released: March 17, 2023; 3. "Gone" Released: July 7, 2023; 4. "Come Down" Released: December 1, 2023

The Beautiful Dark of Life is the ninth studio album by American rock band Atreyu. It was released on December 8, 2023, through Spinefarm Records. The album contains all tracks from three four-track EPs released earlier in the year along with three new tracks; "Dancing with My Demons", "Insomnia", and the title track. The album received mixed-to-positive reviews from music critics.

== Background and promotion ==
On April 17, 2023, Atreyu released an EP titled The Hope of a Spark. Two singles and music videos were released in advance for the EP; "Drowning" on January 30 and "Watch Me Burn" on March 17. On August 18, the band released a second EP, The Moment You Find Your Flame, and revealed there would be a series of EPs released in 2023, in which all the songs would end up on The Beautiful Dark of Life, which was scheduled to be released by the end of the year. A single from the EP, "Gone" was released on July 7. The third and final EP of the series, A Torch in the Dark, was released on November 3. A single from the EP, "Come Down" was released on December 1. On the day A Torch in the Dark was released, it was revealed The Beautiful Dark of Life would be released on December 8.

In between the EPs' release dates, Atreyu embarked on the We Want Your Misery Tour, co-headlined with Memphis May Fire, from August to September 2023. The band also supported Godsmack's Lighting Up the Sky tour around that time.

== Critical reception ==
Professional ratings
Review scores
Source	Rating
Distorted Sound	8/10
Ghost Cult Magazine	7/10
Kerrang!	3/5

The album received mixed to positive reviews from critics. Distorted Sound scored the album 8 out of 10 and said: "To say that Atreyu's current sound is quite the departure from their roots shouldn't be too much of a surprise – anyone who has paid attention to the band since 2006's A Death-Grip on Yesterday will be well-aware that they aren't ones to stick to the same lane within the metalcore/alternative scene. Those that are willing to set aside any bias they may have to the material of the band's past and join them on this dark journey will find a packed album that has taken their long-serving signature sound and allowed it to grow into something else entirely. The Beautiful Dark of Life is a reflective moment for the band – a therapeutic exploration of the insecurities that plague many of us, taking the knowledge of that shared experience and wielding it to their own strength."

Kerrang! gave the album 3 out of 5 and considered the release to follow "a story of despair, hope and self-discovery, encapsulating all elements with the feeling of jubilation. You can feel the band playing to their passionate best, but whilst some moments fly high into the sky like a band re-finding their true form, there's elements that almost fade into the abyss."

== Track listing ==
All tracks are written by Daniel Jacobs, Porter McKnight, Travis Miguel, Kyle Rosa, and Brandon Saller, with additional writers noted.

The Beautiful Dark of Life track listing
No.	Title	Writer(s)	Length
1.	"Drowning"	John Feldmann; Nick Furlong	2:45
2.	"Insomnia"	Feldmann	3:37
3.	"Capital F"	Sierra Deaton; Feldmann	2:34
4.	"God/Devil"	Matt Pauling	3:00
5.	"Watch Me Burn"	Feldmann; Aaron Jennings Puckett	3:35
6.	"Good Enough"	Feldmann	3:17
7.	"Dancing with My Demons"	Matt Squire	3:14
8.	"Gone"	Feldmann; Rachel West; Simon Wilcox	3:44
9.	"I Don't Wanna Die"	Pauling	3:39
10.	"Immortal"	Feldmann; Wilcox	3:10
11.	"(i)"	Tyler Fortney	3:05
12.	"Death or Glory" (featuring Sierra Deaton)	Deaton; Feldmann	4:14
13.	"Forevermore"	Deaton; Feldmann	2:57
14.	"Come Down"	Pauling	4:00
15.	"The Beautiful Dark of Life"	Deaton; Feldmann	3:09
Total length:			50:00

== Personnel ==
Atreyu

- Brandon Saller – clean vocals, keyboards, piano, programming, additional guitars
- Dan Jacobs – guitar
- Travis Miguel – guitar
- Marc "Porter" McKnight – bass, unclean vocals
- Kyle Rosa – drums

Additional musicians

- Sierra Deaton – guest vocals on track 12

Additional personnel

- John Feldmann – production, mixing, engineering
- Ted Jensen – mastering
- Scot Stewart and Dylan McLean – mixing, engineering
- Dennis Larance – photography
