= Lip Gloss and Black =

Single by Atreyu

from the album Suicide Notes and Butterfly Kisses
- Released: 2002
- Genre: Metalcore
- Length: 5:05
- Label: Victory Records
- Songwriters: Dan Jacobs, Travis Miguel, Brandon Saller, Chris Thompson, Alex Varkatzas
- Producer: Eric Rachel

Atreyu singles chronology
"Ain't Love Grand" (2002)	"Lip Gloss and Black" (2002)	"Right Side of the Bed" (2004)

Lip Gloss and Black is the second single from American rock band Atreyu's debut album, Suicide Notes and Butterfly Kisses released in 2002. The song features the lyrics "Live, Love, Burn, Die" which has become one of Atreyu's signature phrases and one of Alex Varkatzas's most noted lyrics. The song itself was one of the first Atreyu songs to gain them mainstream attention, with the video being played extensively on MTV2 and Uranium.

== Music video ==
The music video features footage of bondage between two loved ones, intercut with footage of the band performing at the Showcase Theatre in Corona, California. While previous bass player Chris Thompson performs in the video, future and current Atreyu bass player, Mark McKnight, is seen in the crowd during the performance.

== Track listing ==
No.	Title	Length
1.	"Lip Gloss and Black" (radio edit)	3:34
2.	"Lip Gloss and Black" (album version)	5:05

== Personnel ==
Atreyu

- Alex Varkatzas – lead vocals
- Dan Jacobs – lead guitar
- Travis Miguel – rhythm guitar
- Chris Thomson – bass
- Brandon Saller – drums, clean vocals

Additional personnel

- Jaime Boepple – piano
