= The End Is Not the End (Atreyu album) =

Studio album by Atreyu
- Released: April 24, 2026
- Genres: Metalcore; alternative metal
- Length: 45:06
- Label: Spinefarm
- Producer: Matthew Pauling

Atreyu chronology
The Beautiful Dark of Life (2023)	The End Is Not the End (2026)

Singles from The End Is Not the End
- 1. "Dead" Released: September 17, 2025; 2. "Ego Death" Released: January 30, 2026; 3. "All for You" Released: February 27, 2026; 4. "Children of Light" Released: April 10, 2026

Professional ratings
Review scores
Source	Rating
Blabbermouth.net	8.5/10
Kerrang!	4/5

The End Is Not the End is the tenth studio album by American rock band Atreyu. It was released on April 24, 2026, through Spinefarm Records.

== Background and promotion ==
On September 12, 2025, Atreyu changed their Instagram account to a black box and profile bio to "R.I.P." This led to a countdown that ended on midnight five days later, after which they released the first single for their upcoming tenth studio album entitled "Dead". On January 30, 2026, Atreyu released the second single "Ego Death". On February 27, 2026, the band announced their tenth studio album The End Is Not the End as well as the album's third single "All for You". The band described the album as the heaviest and most adventurous they ever made. They also described it as their biggest musical journey in years.

== Touring ==
In February 2026, Atreyu was announced as part of the lineup for the Louder Than Life music festival in Louisville, scheduled to take place in September. The band are also confirmed to be appearing at Welcome to Rockville taking place in Daytona Beach, Florida in May 2026. Additionally, they will make an appearance on the 2026 Vans Warped Tour.

== Track listing ==
All tracks are written by Dan Jacobs, Porter McKnight, Travis Miguel, Brandon Saller, and Matthew Pauling.

The End Is Not the End track listing
No.	Title	Length
1.	"The End Is Not the End"	0:55
2.	"Dead"	4:04
3.	"Break Me"	3:10
4.	"All for You"	3:54
5.	"Ghost in Me"	2:56
6.	"Glass Eater"	3:50
7.	"Wait My Love, I'll Be Home Soon"	4:09
8.	"Ego Death"	2:12
9.	"Death Rattle"	3:29
10.	"Children of Light" (featuring Max Cavalera)	4:12
11.	"In the Dark"	3:52
12.	"Afterglow"	3:32
13.	"Break the Glass"	4:51
Total length:		45:06

== Personnel ==
Credits are adapted from Tidal.

Atreyu

- Brandon Saller – lead vocals, keyboards, backing vocals
- Dan Jacobs – guitar, backing vocals
- Travis Miguel – guitar, backing vocals
- Porter McKnight – bass, unclean vocals
- Kyle Rosa – drums

Additional musicians

- Max Cavalera – guest vocals (track 10)
- Ashley Saller – backing vocals
- Jennifer Miguel – backing vocals
- Julia McKnight – backing vocals
- Mollie Rosen – backing vocals
- Piper Saller – backing vocals
- Ruby Saller – backing vocals

Additional personnel

- Matthew Pauling – guitar, production, engineering, mixing; backing vocals
- Tyler Beans – engineering
- Ted Jensen – mastering

== Charts ==
Chart performance for The End Is Not the End
Chart (2026)	Peak position
French Rock & Metal Albums (SNEP)	55
UK Album Downloads (Official Charts)	48
UK Rock & Metal Albums (Official Charts)	19
