= Ain't Love Grand (song) =

Single by Atreyu

from the album Suicide Notes and Butterfly Kisses
- Released: 2002
- Genre: Metalcore
- Length: 3:43
- Label: Victory Records
- Songwriters: Dan Jacobs, Travis Miguel, Brandon Saller, Chris Thompson, Alex Varkatzas
- Producer: Eric Rachel

Atreyu singles chronology
"Ain't Love Grand" (2002)	"Lip Gloss and Black" (2002)

"Ain't Love Grand" is the first single from American rock band Atreyu's debut album, Suicide Notes and Butterfly Kisses, released in 2002.

== Concept ==
I wrote this after watching someone very close to me go through a devastating break up, and it made me reflect on some things I have been through. I kind of wrote this to share with my friend that we have gone through the same things, and I feel his pain exactly; the "gutted like a pig" line and "all you want is the world to bleed" were taken verbatim from a convo we had, so in a way he should get partial writing credit on this song.

- Alex Varkatzas

== Music video ==
The music video features the band performing in red room, with footage of party intercut. At the party, a man becomes intoxicated and eventually blacks out. He later comes to watch medics inspect his unconscious body, while screaming at his body to get up. Members of the band also are seen as background characters at the party.
