= Fractures in the Facade of Your Porcelain Beauty =

EP by Atreyu
- Released: November 20, 2001
- Recorded: July 2001
- Venue: Orange County, California
- Studio: For the Record
- Genre: Metalcore
- Length: 18:36
- Label: Tribunal
- Producer: Atreyu and Paul Miner

Atreyu chronology
| Visions (1999) | Fractures in the Facade of Your Porcelain Beauty (2001) | Suicide Notes and Butterfly Kisses (2002) |

Fractures in the Facade of Your Porcelain Beauty is the second EP by American rock band Atreyu. It was originally released on November 20, 2001, and released again on January 29, 2002, under the independent label Tribunal Records. The EP has early versions of the songs "Living Each Day Like You're Already Dead", "Someone's Standing on My Chest" and "Tulips Are Better", which were re-worked and included on the band's next release, Suicide Notes and Butterfly Kisses. The EP was released before the band's huge success following their first album and original pressings are increasingly hard to find. The vocalist, Alex Varkatzas, has a deeper approach to his screams on this album compared to Suicide Notes and Butterfly Kisses. The album is the first Atreyu release with Travis Miguel on second guitar, as opposed to the Visions EP which only had the founding guitarist, Dan Jacobs.

Professional ratings
Review scores
| Source | Rating |
|---|---|
| Lambgoat.com | 6/10 stars |

== Track listing ==
All tracks are written by Atreyu.

| No. | Title | Length |
|---|---|---|
| 1. | "Living Each Day Like You're Already Dead" | 3:00 |
| 2. | "Tulips Are Better" | 3:27 |
| 3. | "A Letter to Someone Like You" | 3:19 |
| 4. | "Taking Back Every Word That I Said" | 4:11 |
| 5. | "Someone's Standing on My Chest" | 4:44 |
| Total length: | | 18:36 |

== Personnel ==
Band line-up

- Alex Varkatzas - unclean vocals
- Daniel Jacobs - guitar
- Travis Miguel - guitar
- Chris Thomson - bass
- Brandon Saller - drums, clean vocals

Additional credits

- Alex Varkatzas and Chad Tafolla – album concept and layout
- Corinne and Matt Gigliotti - live photographs
- Atreyu - producer
- Paul Miner – producer, engineer, mixing
