= Lead Sails Paper Anchor =

Studio album by Atreyu
- Released: August 28, 2007
- Recorded: San Simeon
- Genres: Alternative metal; melodic metalcore
- Length: 41:11; 53:25 (re-release)
- Labels: Hollywood; Roadrunner
- Producer: John Feldmann

Atreyu chronology
The Best Of... Atreyu (2007)	Lead Sails Paper Anchor (2007)	Congregation of the Damned (2009)

Alternative cover
- Lead Sails Paper Anchor 2.0

Singles from Lead Sails Paper Anchor
- 1. "Becoming the Bull" Released: July 24, 2007; 2. "Doomsday" Released: November 26, 2007; 3. "Falling Down" Released: January 29, 2008; 4. "Slow Burn" Released: June 17, 2008

Lead Sails Paper Anchor is the fourth studio album by American rock band Atreyu. It is the band's first release with Hollywood Records, and the album had a significantly different sound to it than their previous albums, moving away from a metalcore-type sound, for the most part. The album was released on August 28, 2007. The first single was "Becoming the Bull".

A single for "Becoming the Bull" was released exclusively in Hot Topic on July 24 and it included a demo of the song "Can't Happen Here".

Lead Sails Paper Anchor was Atreyu's most commercially successful album, debuting at number 8 on the Billboard 200 and topping the Hard Rock Albums and Alternative Albums charts. "Doomsday" was released as the second single only in the UK. "Falling Down" was released as the third single and second in the US. "Slow Burn" was released as the album's third single. On May 14, 2009, a video for "Blow" was released.

On April 22, 2008, the album was re-released as Lead Sails Paper Anchor 2.0, which included updated artwork and a new song titled "The Squeeze" recorded exclusively for the re-release, plus the two bonus tracks "Epic" and "Clean Sheets". It was formatted in the CDVU+ format, featuring exclusive videos, live performances, behind the scenes tour clips, and a digital guitar lesson.

The song "Doomsday" is featured in the background of the current X-Games TV commercial.

The Japanese version of the album includes the acoustic version of the song "Lead Sails (And a Paper Anchor)".

== Promotion ==
Before the release of the album, Atreyu made available a jigsaw puzzle game for fans eager to hear a song from the new album. Each puzzle piece was a 10-second sound bite of the first single off the album, "Becoming the Bull". The object of the game was to arrange the clips in order, and create the song. As an additional incentive, the fan to put the song together the fastest would win a signed guitar, a phone call from the band, an advance copy of the CD and a free membership to Atreyu's fan club. The game was posted on the band's official website, and was taken down shortly after the album was released.

In promotion for the next major single off the album, Atreyu released a game created by Jason Oda, based on their single, "Falling Down". The game allows you to play as all of the members of the band, with each of them having their own unique gameplay type and levels. In lead singer Alex Varkatzas' game, "Alex Slaughters Cute Stuff," users dodge rainbows and hearts while slaughtering teddy bears. Other games include: "Dan Becomes Guitar Hero" a game similar to Guitar Hero, "Travis Makes McTreyu Burgers" a remake of the 1982 arcade game BurgerTime, "Marc Busts Ghosts" a game similar to Ice Climber, and "Brandon Falls Down Into Hell" where the Brandon Saller character fights off creatures from hell while collecting ice cream cones.

In an interview on YouTube with Brandon Saller and Marc McKnight of Atreyu, when asked about the game they said,

[McKnight] "Jason Oda's, the guy that designed it that does the games like that, I've been a huge fan of his artwork and his games for years now. And then I got an email when he had already completed the first proof of the game. I was like, 'Oh my God, he made one for us?'" [Saller] "We liked the video game for 'Becoming the Bull,' but it was kind of like a quiz thing. It wasn't really a game, but this is a full-fledged video game. It's hilarious. We all have our own levels, it's hilarious. I highly recommend kids to play it if you play video games. Even if you don't, I don't even play video games and I sat there for like an hour playing it. It's hard."

Creator Jason Oda says,

"The Atreyu game is a mix between old school arcade game play and modern polished graphics. The inspiration for the game partially comes from the arcade game for the band Journey."

"Falling Down" was also featured in the music video game, Guitar Hero on Tour: Modern Hits.

Professional ratings
Review scores
Source	Rating
About.com	2.5/5 stars
Allmusic	3/5 stars
Berontakzine.com	5/10 stars
Collector's Guide to Heavy Metal	2/10
Sputnikmusic	1.5/5 stars

== Track listing ==
All lyrics are written by Atreyu; all music is composed by Atreyu.

No.	Title	Length
1.	"Doomsday"	3:20
2.	"Honor"	3:09
3.	"Falling Down"	3:00
4.	"Becoming the Bull"	3:44
5.	"When Two Are One"	4:41
6.	"Lose It"	4:01
7.	"No One Cares"	3:03
8.	"Can't Happen Here"	4:05
9.	"Slow Burn"	3:30
10.	"Blow" (featuring Josh Todd)	4:12
11.	"Lead Sails (And a Paper Anchor)"	4:26
Total length:		41:11

Re-release edition bonus tracks
No.	Title	Length
12.	"The Squeeze"	4:06
13.	"Epic" (Faith No More cover)	4:54
14.	"Clean Sheets" (Descendents cover)	3:13
Total length:		53:25

== Personnel ==
- Alex Varkatzas – lead vocals
- Dan Jacobs – guitar
- Travis Miguel – guitar
- Marc McKnight – bass, vocals
- Brandon Saller – co-lead vocals, drums, percussion, additional guitar, programming, keyboards

=== Technical personnel ===
- Produced and recorded by John Feldman
- Engineered by Kyle Moorman
- Mixed by Andy Wallace
- Lyrics by Alex Varkatzas
- Mastered by Howie Weinberg

== Charts ==
=== Albums ===
Chart (2007)	Peak position
Japanese Albums Chart (Oricon)	263
Scottish Albums (Official Charts)	77
UK Albums (Official Charts)	77
US Billboard 200	8
US Alternative Albums (Billboard)	1
Digital Albums (Billboard)	8
US Hard Rock Albums (Billboard)	1
US Rock Albums (Billboard)	1

=== Singles ===
Year	Title	Hot Mainstream Rock Tracks	Hot Modern Rock Tracks
2007	"Becoming the Bull"	5	11
2007	"Doomsday"	–	–
2008	"Falling Down"	5	3
2008	"Slow Burn"	16	16

== Certifications ==
Region	Certification	Certified units/sales
United States (RIAA)	Gold	500,000^{‡}
^{‡} Sales+streaming figures based on certification alone.
