= Long Live (Atreyu album) =

Studio album by Atreyu
- Released: September 18, 2015
- Genre: Metalcore
- Length: 47:03
- Label: Spinefarm
- Producers: Fred Archambault; Atreyu (co.)

Atreyu chronology
Covers of the Damned (2010)	Long Live (2015)	In Our Wake (2018)

Singles from Long Live
- 1. "Long Live" Released: July 17, 2015; 2. "Do You Know Who You Are?" Released: September 9, 2015

Long Live is the sixth studio album by American rock band Atreyu. The album was released on September 18, 2015 through Spinefarm Records. It is Atreyu's first album since Congregation of the Damned in 2009. Long Live peaked at No. 26 on the Billboard 200, making it Atreyu's first album since The Curse to miss the top 20 of the chart.

Professional ratings
Aggregate scores
Source	Rating
Metacritic	84/100
Review scores
Source	Rating
Absolutepunk.net	8.5/10 stars
Blabbermouth.net	8/10 stars
Kerrang!	4/5 stars
Sputnikmusic	4.9/5 stars

== Track listing ==
All tracks are written by Atreyu.

No.	Title	Length
1.	"Long Live"	3:28
2.	"Live to Labor"	3:13
3.	"I Would Kill / Lie / Die (For You)"	4:10
4.	"Cut Off the Head"	5:00
5.	"A Bitter Broken Memory"	3:58
6.	"Do You Know Who You Are?"	3:50
7.	"Revival"	1:41
8.	"Heartbeats and Flatlines"	3:39
9.	"Brass Balls"	3:28
10.	"Moments Before Dawn"	5:25
11.	"Start to Break"	4:40
12.	"Reckless"	4:31
Total length:		47:03

Best Buy edition
No.	Title	Length
13.	"When the Day Is Done"	4:22
14.	"Right Side of the Bed" (live)	4:21
15.	"Blow" (live)	4:19
Total length:		60:05

Target edition
No.	Title	Length
13.	"So Others May Live"	4:19
14.	"Stronger Than Me"	3:12
Total length:		54:34

== Personnel ==
Atreyu

- Alex Varkatzas – lead vocals
- Dan Jacobs – guitar
- Travis Miguel – guitar
- Porter McKnight – bass guitar
- Brandon Saller – drums, clean vocals

Technical personnel

- Fred Archambault – producer, engineer, mixing, additional programming
- Atreyu – co-producer
- Howie Weinberg – mastering
- Adal Wiley – additional programming
- Stephen Ferrera-Grand – guitar tech and rentals
- Mike Fasano – drum tech and rentals
- Matt Pauling – drum editing and programming
- Geoff Neal – assistant engineer, additional engineering
- Porter McKnight – design, photography, art direction

== Charts ==
Chart (2015)	Peak position
Australian Albums (ARIA)	29
Scottish Albums (Official Charts)	74
UK Albums (Official Charts)	96
US Billboard 200	26
US Independent Albums (Billboard)	6
US Top Hard Rock Albums (Billboard)	4
US Top Rock Albums (Billboard)	9
