= Congregation of the Damned =

Studio album by Atreyu
- Released: October 27, 2009
- Recorded: Henson Studios, Los Angeles
- Genre: Metalcore
- Length: 48:41
- Labels: Hollywood; Roadrunner
- Producer: Bob Marlette

Atreyu chronology
Lead Sails Paper Anchor (2007)	Congregation of the Damned (2009)	Covers of the Damned (2010)

Singles from Congregation of the Damned
- 1. "Storm to Pass" Released: September 17, 2009; 2. "Lonely" Released: April 12, 2010; 3. "Gallows" Released: May 17, 2010

Congregation of the Damned is the fifth studio album by American rock band Atreyu. It was released through Hollywood Records and Roadrunner Records on October 27, 2009.

The album debuted at No. 18 on the Billboard 200, selling 26,000 copies in its first week of release. The album has sold 121,000 copies in the United States as of August 2015.

== Composition ==
=== Influences, style and themes ===
For Congregation of the Damned, Atreyu expressed an interest in returning to their "heavy hardcore" roots, following 2007's Lead Sails Paper Anchor, while also wanting to "move forward." Comparing the new album to Lead Sails, drummer Brandon Saller stated that "there were parts of 'Atreyu' missing and that we needed back, so we've brought them back." He also went on to claim that the band had been "reflecting on how far we've come and where from. It's stepping forward to new territory but taking with us the best of where we've been." Similarly, lead singer Alex Varkatzas claimed that the record is a "mix of everything we've ever done. For every song that's more melodic or rock-driven there's a total shitkicker, and I think that's what makes us a well-rounded band."

The album was produced by Bob Marlette, who has previously worked such artists as Ozzy Osbourne and Airbourne, and it was mixed by Rich Costey who has worked with The Mars Volta, System of a Down and Rage Against the Machine.

When speaking about lyrical themes, Alex Varkatzas claimed that since "The music is heavier, I was able to write darker lyrics." He went on to state that the "personal" material encompasses themes such as "self-doubt" and "self-loathing", and claimed that "I'm not singing about dark things to promote them, I'm singing about them so I don't go insane. It's pure catharsis. I make music so I don't go crazy." On the matter of lyrics, Brandon Saller, claimed that "a lot of them are in a similar vein" to the band's 2004 album The Curse, but without the "vampire stuff."

On the subject of the album's title, Varkatzas stated:

I wrote the line Congregation of the Damned for one of the songs on the album and it got me thinking. It kind of feels like in a lot of ways that we, as members of a society, are just gathering around and collectively getting fucked over. When you look at what's going on in our economy and how other people treat each other, it's kind of like we're all just lemmings. We're lined up blankly staring blindly at nothing and just going along with the flow like a congregation of the damned. So this record really reflects my thoughts and feelings about that in every possible way.

== Promotion ==
The band started a co-headlining tour with Hollywood Undead and Escape the Fate in October 2009, and as promotion of album have debuted songs like "Bleeding Is a Luxury" at K-Rockathon 14 in New York State Fairgrounds, Syracuse, NY., and "Gallows". Atreyu has also promoted their new album in many other ways. For example, 5 webisodes, between September 1 to October 20 every two weeks, have been released advertising the album. They describe the album to "Make more sense than the other ones because they finally realize what they are."

They have also released two songs on their Myspace, "Stop! Before It's Too Late and We've Destroyed It All" and "Storm to Pass", on September 13 and 15, 2009, respectively; "Storm to Pass" was also their first US Radio single from Congregation of the Damned. "Gallows" was later released on October 20 in a promotional game entitled Metal Head Zombies, which is a first-person shooter loosely based on Call of Duty.

Dan Jacobs and Travis Miguel also appeared in Issue 5 of the Eternal Descent comic book series, which featured a narrative inspired by the song "Black Days Begin" from Congregation of the Damned.

The song "Ravenous" features on the music video game, Guitar Hero: Warriors of Rock.

Atreyu began their The Congregation of the Damned Tour with Blessthefall, Chiodos, Architects, and Endless Hallway on October 20 in Anaheim, CA.

Professional ratings
Review scores
Source	Rating
AllMusic	3/5 stars
Alternative Press	2/5 stars
Collector's Guide to Heavy Metal	1/10
CWG Magazine	2/5 stars
Fangoria	2.5/4 stars
Rock Sound	7/10

== Track listing ==
All lyrics are written by Atreyu; all music is composed by Atreyu.

No.	Title	Length
1.	"Stop! Before It's Too Late and We've Destroyed It All"	3:50
2.	"Bleeding Is a Luxury"	3:32
3.	"Congregation of the Damned"	3:31
4.	"Coffin Nails"	3:23
5.	"Black Days Begin"	3:53
6.	"Gallows"	3:29
7.	"Storm to Pass"	3:48
8.	"You Were the King, Now You're Unconscious"	5:08
9.	"Insatiable"	4:01
10.	"So Wrong"	3:20
11.	"Ravenous"	3:08
12.	"Lonely"	3:40
13.	"Wait for You"	4:01
Total length:		48:41

Best Buy edition
No.	Title	Length
14.	"We Are the Living Dead"	3:45
15.	"Bravery"	3:42
Total length:		56:08

Hot Topic edition
No.	Title	Length
16.	"Another Night (Wishing I Wasn't Here)"	4:16
Total length:		60:24

== Personnel ==
Atreyu

- Alex Varkatzas – vocals, lyrics
- Dan Jacobs – guitar
- Travis Miguel – guitar
- Marc McKnight – bass, vocals
- Brandon Saller – drums, percussion, vocals

Production

- Bob Marlette – production, keyboards
- Tracks 1–5, 7, 12 and 13 mixed by Rich Costey
- Tracks 6 and 8–11 mixed by Noah Shain
- Track 8 mixed and programmed by Sonny Moore

== Charts ==
Chart performance
Chart (2009)	Peak position
Australian Albums (ARIA)	39
Canadian Albums (Billboard)	22
UK Albums (Official Charts)	116
UK Rock & Metal Albums (Official Charts)	8
US Billboard 200	18
US Top Hard Rock Albums (Billboard)	4
US Top Rock Albums (Billboard)	8
