= Suicide Notes and Butterfly Kisses =

Studio album by Atreyu
- Released: June 4, 2002
- Studios: Trax East, West West Side Music and Death Tracks
- Genres: Melodic metalcore; pop screamo
- Length: 38:00
- Label: Victory
- Producer: Eric Rachel

Atreyu chronology
Fractures in the Facade of Your Porcelain Beauty (2001)	Suicide Notes and Butterfly Kisses (2002)	The Curse (2004)

Singles from Suicide Notes and Butterfly Kisses
- 1. "Ain't Love Grand" Released: 2002; 2. "Lip Gloss and Black" Released: 2002

Suicide Notes and Butterfly Kisses is the debut studio album by American rock band Atreyu. It was released on June 4, 2002, under Victory Records. The album featured re-worked versions of the songs "Living Each Day Like You're Already Dead", "Someone's Standing on My Chest" and "Tulips Are Better", which originally appeared on the band's 2001 EP, Fractures in the Facade of Your Porcelain Beauty. "Ain't Love Grand" and "Lip Gloss and Black" were released as singles and music videos were also made for these two songs. The latter video found significant airplay on Headbangers Ball and Uranium in the fall of 2003.

The album has sold more than 240,000 copies worldwide (according to March 2006 Nielsen SoundScan data) and continues to rise.

It is the only album to feature bassist Chris Thomson.

The album was originally to be released under the title of The Death Rock Diaries. The album name change simply came from the band liking Suicide Notes and Butterfly Kisses more as a title.

Professional ratings
Review scores
Source	Rating
AllMusic	4/5 stars
Lambgoat.com	7/10 stars
Berontakzine.com	6/10 stars
Punknews.org	4.5/5 stars

== Track listing ==
All lyrics are written by Alex Varkatzas; all music is composed by Brandon Saller, Dan Jacobs, and Travis Miguel.

No.	Title	Length
1.	"A Song for the Optimists"	4:42
2.	"Dilated"	3:38
3.	"Ain't Love Grand"	3:43
4.	"Living Each Day Like You're Already Dead"	2:45
5.	"Deanne the Arsonist"	3:42
6.	"Someone's Standing on My Chest"	4:12
7.	"At Least I Know I'm a Sinner" (featuring Efrem Schulz of Death by Stereo)	3:22
8.	"Tulips Are Better"	3:32
9.	"A Vampire's Lament"	3:20
10.	"Lip Gloss and Black"	5:05
Total length:		38:00

=== Limited edition re-release ===
On February 23, 2004, Victory Records re-released Suicide Notes and Butterfly Kisses as a "limited edition" with new liner notes from the band. The new version of the album shipped with a bonus DVD. The DVD contains a live concert featuring six songs at the Showcase Theatre, Corona, California held on December 27, 2003, two of the band's music videos, a documentary "Lairs" which takes a look at the homes of the band members, and biographies of the members of the band and crew, as follows:

- "Deanne the Arsonist" (live video)
- "Someone's Standing on My Chest" (live video)
- "Ain't Love Grand" (live video)
- "A Song for the Optimists" (live video)
- "Dilated" (live video)
- "Lip Gloss and Black" (live video)
- "Ain't Love Grand" (music video)
- "Lip Gloss and Black" (music video)
- Documentary
- Biographies

Only 25,000 copies of the limited-edition version of the album were pressed and each copy is numbered in accordance.

== Personnel ==
=== Band line-up ===
- Alex Varkatzas - unclean vocals, lyrics
- Dan Jacobs - guitar
- Travis Miguel - guitar
- Chris Thomson - bass
- Brandon Saller - drums, clean vocals, additional guitar, keyboards

=== Additional credits ===
- Album artwork by Justin Borucki
- Album layout by Paul Miner
- DVD artwork (limited edition only) by Justin Borucki and Clifford Raines
- DVD produced (limited edition only) by Maxx Padilla of Click Vision Productions
- DVD concert footage (limited edition only) provided by Sean Stiegemeier
- Guest vocals on "At Least I Know I'm a Sinner" performed by Efrem Schulz (Death by Stereo)
- Mastered by Alan Douches
- Ryan Saller - sitar
- Piano on "Lip Gloss and Black" performed by Jaime Boepple
- Recorded, mixed and produced by Eric Rachel

== Charts ==
Chart performance
Chart (2004)	Peak position
US Heatseekers Albums (Billboard)	37
US Independent Albums (Billboard)	30
