= A Death-Grip on Yesterday =

Studio album by Atreyu
- Released: March 28, 2006
- Recorded: 2005 Pulse Recording Studios, Los Angeles, California
- Genre: Metalcore
- Length: 32:49
- Label: Victory
- Producers: Josh Abraham; Atreyu

Atreyu chronology
| The Curse (2004) | A Death-Grip on Yesterday (2006) | The Best Of... Atreyu (2007) |

Singles from A Death-Grip on Yesterday
- 1. "Ex's and Oh's" Released: March 13, 2006; 2. "The Theft" Released: August 28, 2006

A Death-Grip on Yesterday is the third studio album by American rock band Atreyu. It was released on March 28, 2006, through Victory Records. It debuted at number 9 on the Billboard 200.

The album was released with a Victory Records DVD featuring the making of the album and promotional videos by Victory Records artists.

An instrumental version of the album, as well as The Curse, was released on iTunes on January 9, 2007.

Professional ratings
Review scores
| Source | Rating |
|---|---|
| AllMusic | 3/5 stars |
| Blistering | (average) |
| Collector's Guide to Heavy Metal | 2/10 |
| IGN | 6.2/10 |
| PopMatters | 5/10 |
| Punknews.org | 4.5/5 stars |

== Track listing ==
All tracks are written by Atreyu.

| No. | Title | Length |
|---|---|---|
| 1. | "Creature" | 2:59 |
| 2. | "Shameful" | 3:29 |
| 3. | "Our Sick Story (Thus Far)" | 3:31 |
| 4. | "The Theft" | 3:58 |
| 5. | "We Stand Up" | 3:06 |
| 6. | "Ex's and Oh's" | 3:31 |
| 7. | "Your Private War" | 3:33 |
| 8. | "My Fork in the Road (Your Knife in My Back)" | 3:25 |
| 9. | "Untitled Finale" | 5:17 |
| Total length: | | 32:49 |

== Personnel ==
=== Band line-up ===
- Alex Varkatzas – unclean vocals
- Dan Jacobs – lead guitar
- Travis Miguel – rhythm guitar
- Marc McKnight – bass, backing vocals
- Brandon Saller – clean vocals, drums, percussion, additional guitar, keyboards, programming

=== Additional credits ===
- Alex Varkatzas – lyrics
- Jeff Gros – photography
- Brian Warwick – assistant mixing
- Ted Jensen – mastering
- Josh Abraham – production
- Ryan Williams – engineering, mixing
- Scott Adair – management
- Atreyu – production
- Don Clark – artwork, layout design
- Tim Smith – management

== Charts ==
Album - Billboard (North America)

| Chart (2006) | Peak position |
|---|---|
| UK Albums (Official Charts) | 92 |
| US Billboard 200 | 9 |
| Top Independent Albums | 1 |

Singles - Billboard (United States)

| Year | Single | Chart | Position |
|---|---|---|---|
| 2006 | "Ex's and Oh's" | Hot Mainstream Rock Tracks | 24 |
