= The Curse (Atreyu album) =

2004 studio album by Atreyu

Studio album by Atreyu
- Released: June 29, 2004
- Studios: Plumper Mountain Sound, Gibsons BC and The Warehouse Studio
- Genre: Metalcore
- Length: 43:22
- Label: Victory
- Producer: GGGarth

Atreyu chronology
Suicide Notes and Butterfly Kisses (2002)	The Curse (2004)	A Death-Grip on Yesterday (2006)

Singles from The Curse
- 1. "Right Side of the Bed" Released: February 2, 2004; 2. "Bleeding Mascara" Released: July 17, 2004; 3. "The Crimson" Released: July 12, 2005

The Curse is the second studio album by American rock band Atreyu. It was released on June 29, 2004, under Victory Records. The album went on to produce three singles, "Bleeding Mascara", "Right Side of the Bed" and "The Crimson".

The videos for "Right Side of the Bed" and "The Crimson" achieved much airplay on television networks such as MTV2 and Fuse. The songs also received airplay on some radio stations across various countries. Since its release, The Curse has gone on to sell more than 500,000 copies and it was certified gold by the RIAA on September 14, 2020.

== Critical reception ==
Professional ratings
Review scores
Source	Rating
AllMusic	3.5/5 stars
Collector's Guide to Heavy Metal	3/10
PopMatters	(favorable)
Rolling Stone	3/5 stars

AllMusic said that the record "expands mightily on the promise and power of their debut, Suicide Notes and Butterfly Kisses", praising the band for using the effects from touring for their first album to "bring[s] forth an explosion of creativity" throughout the track listing, concluding that with "a set of songs this good it's hard to resist the thought that Atreyu's punishing work ethic may not be such a bad thing for their music." Kirk Miller, writing for Rolling Stone, said about the band's use of the metalcore genre, "On record, the results are more confused, with dual vocalists Alex Varkatzas and Brandon Saller occasionally canceling each other out. But when the band sticks to melody and brings out the big arena-rock drums on songs such as "Right Side of the Bed," it creates true headbanging nirvana. And those guitar solos? Pure awesomeness."

== Track listing ==
All lyrics are written by Alex Varkatzas, except where noted; all music is composed by Dan Jacobs, Travis Miguel, and Brandon Saller, except where noted.

No.	Title	Length
1.	"Blood Children (An Introduction)"	1:14
2.	"Bleeding Mascara"	2:26
3.	"Right Side of the Bed"	3:42
4.	"This Flesh a Tomb"	3:59
5.	"You Eclipsed by Me"	3:38
6.	"The Crimson"	4:01
7.	"The Remembrance Ballad"	4:27
8.	"An Interlude"	2:09
9.	"Corseting"	2:10
10.	"Demonology and Heartache"	3:42
11.	"My Sanity on the Funeral Pyre"	3:40
12.	"Nevada's Grace"	3:48
13.	"Five Vicodin Chased with a Shot of Clarity"	4:26
Total length:		43:22

=== Japanese, Best Buy and 20th anniversary edition bonus track ===
No.	Title	Writer(s)	Length
14.	"You Give Love a Bad Name"	Desmond Child; Richie Sambora; Jon Bon Jovi	3:26

- A limited edition version of The Curse, which was only available at Best Buy stores, included a cover of Bon Jovi's "You Give Love a Bad Name" (Bonus Track). It was limited to 30,000 copies and used different cover, which is in black. The track is also included on the Japanese release.
- "Right Side of the Bed" appears on the soundtrack for the video game Burnout 3: Takedown.

=== Colored vinyl releases ===
- Clear Green (unknown)
- Clear (1040 copies)
- Red (1023)
- Gold (1019)
- White (121)
- Blue (500)
- Clear with Black Smoke (120)

=== Limited edition re-release ===
On June 28, 2005, Victory Records re-released The Curse with a bonus DVD. The bonus DVD included four of the band's music videos, as follows:

- "Ain't Love Grand" (Music video)
- "Lip Gloss and Black" (Music video)
- "Right Side of the Bed" (Music video)
- "The Crimson" (Music video)

Only 30,000 copies of the limited-edition version of the album were pressed and each copy is numbered in accordance.

=== Instrumental Version ===
Available on iTunes. Based on the normal 13 track version of the album.

== Personnel ==
=== Band line-up ===
- Alex Varkatzas - vocals
- Dan Jacobs - guitar
- Travis Miguel - guitar
- Marc McKnight¹ - bass
- Brandon Saller - drums, percussion, vocals, keyboards, programming

¹ Marc McKnight is listed as a member of the band but it is unclear as to whether he played bass on the recording. On The Curse DVD McKnight can be seen playing bass in nearly all of the songs recorded. The band gives thanks to Tom Macdonald, from the Canadian pop rock band, Hedley, for "lending his bass skills" to the recording, but it is not known whether he played bass on every song or only a select few.

- In an interview with Toazted, posted on YouTube in 2012, Brandon Saller claimed that they had hired a studio bass player and McKnight picked up playing with the band at the beginning of tour. He had learned all of the songs 3 weeks prior to the tour, and played his first show at a festival in Las Vegas for over 2,500 people.

=== Additional credits ===
- Album layout by Jason Link and Alex Varkatzas
- Band photographs by Sean Stiegemeier
- Digital editing by Ben Kaplan; assisted by Lee Robertson, Kurt McNally and Brian Gallant
- Effects, make-up and teeth fabrication (model) by Louie Zakarian
- Engineered by Dean Maher
- Hair (model) by Silvia McBride
- Mastered by Howie Weinberg
- Mixed by Josh Wilbur
- Model is Natalia Delano
- Photography (model) by Thomas Bogucki
- Produced by GGGarth
- Re-touching (model) by Peter Possenti
- Styling (model) by Selena Leong
- Lyrics by Alex Varkatzas

== Charts ==
=== Weekly charts ===
Weekly chart performance
Chart (2004)	Peak position
UK Independent Albums (Official Charts)	31
UK Rock & Metal Albums (Official Charts)	36
US Billboard 200	32
US Independent Albums (Billboard)	1

=== Year-end charts ===
Year-end chart performance
Chart (2004)	Position
US Independent Albums (Billboard)	23

== Certifications ==
Certifications
Region	Certification	Certified units/sales
United States (RIAA)	Gold	500,000^{‡}
^{‡} Sales+streaming figures based on certification alone.
