= Atreyu =

American rock band

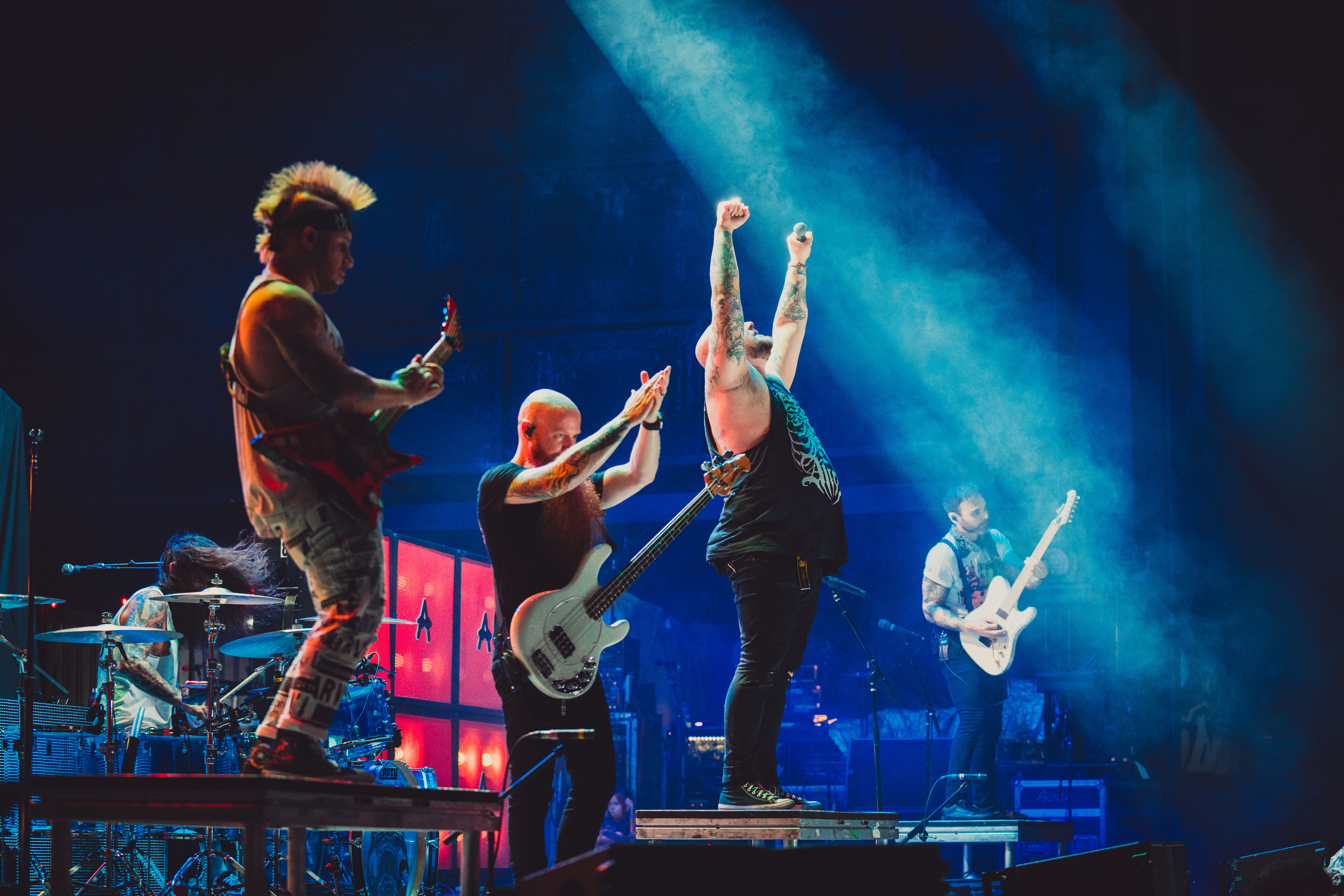
- Atreyu performing in 2022. From left to right: Kyle Rosa, Dan Jacobs, Marc McKnight, Brandon Saller, and Travis Miguel.

Background information
- Origin: Yorba Linda, California, U.S.
- Genres: Metalcore; post-hardcore; alternative metal; hard rock
- Years active: 1998–2011; 2014–present
- Labels: Tribunal; Victory; Hollywood; Roadrunner; Spinefarm
- Members: Dan Jacobs; Brandon Saller; Travis Miguel; Marc McKnight; Kyle Rosa
- Past members: Alex Varkatzas; Brian O'Donnell; Kyle Stanley; Chris Thomson
- Website: atreyuofficial.com

Atreyu is an American rock band from Yorba Linda, California, formed in 1998. The band's current line-up consists of guitarists Dan Jacobs and Travis Miguel, lead vocalist Brandon Saller, bassist and unclean vocalist Marc "Porter" McKnight and drummer Kyle Rosa.

The band has released ten studio albums: Suicide Notes and Butterfly Kisses (2002), The Curse (2004), A Death-Grip on Yesterday (2006), Lead Sails Paper Anchor (2007), Congregation of the Damned (2009), Long Live (2015), In Our Wake (2018), Baptize (2021), The Beautiful Dark of Life (2023) and The End Is Not the End (2026).

== History ==
=== Independent years (1998–2000) ===
Originally named Retribution, the band changed their name to "Atreyu" after the character named Atreju from Michael Ende's fantasy book The Neverending Story. The name change came because of a change of members and a progression in their musical styling. In 1998, Atreyu released an independent seven-track EP titled Visions. The album was sold at their live performances. Their second release, was a short five-track EP titled Fractures in the Facade of Your Porcelain Beauty released by underground label Tribunal Records and featured tracks that would be re-worked for later releases. Atreyu signed with Victory Records in 2001, and their most critically acclaimed works would be to come from these releases. The lineup originally consisted of guitarists Dan Jacobs and Travis Miguel, lead vocalist Alex Varkatzas, and bassist Kyle Stanley. They did not have a drummer until 1998 when Ryan Saller, a friend of the band, invited his younger brother Brandon Saller to join as the drummer and played on the Visions EP.

=== Signed to Victory Records (2001–2006) ===
In 2001, Atreyu signed with Victory Records, later releasing in 2002 their first studio album Suicide Notes and Butterfly Kisses. Brandon Saller sang for the band as a second singer, who would become more prolific in their later releases. However, for Suicide Notes and Butterfly Kisses, his parts were largely confined to choruses. Music videos were filmed for the singles "Ain't Love Grand" and "Lip Gloss and Black". The latter video found significant airplay on Headbangers Ball and Uranium in fall of 2003, gaining Atreyu some of its initial mainstream attention. Kyle Stanley quit the band and was replaced first by Chris Thomson, and then by Marc "Porter" McKnight in 2004.

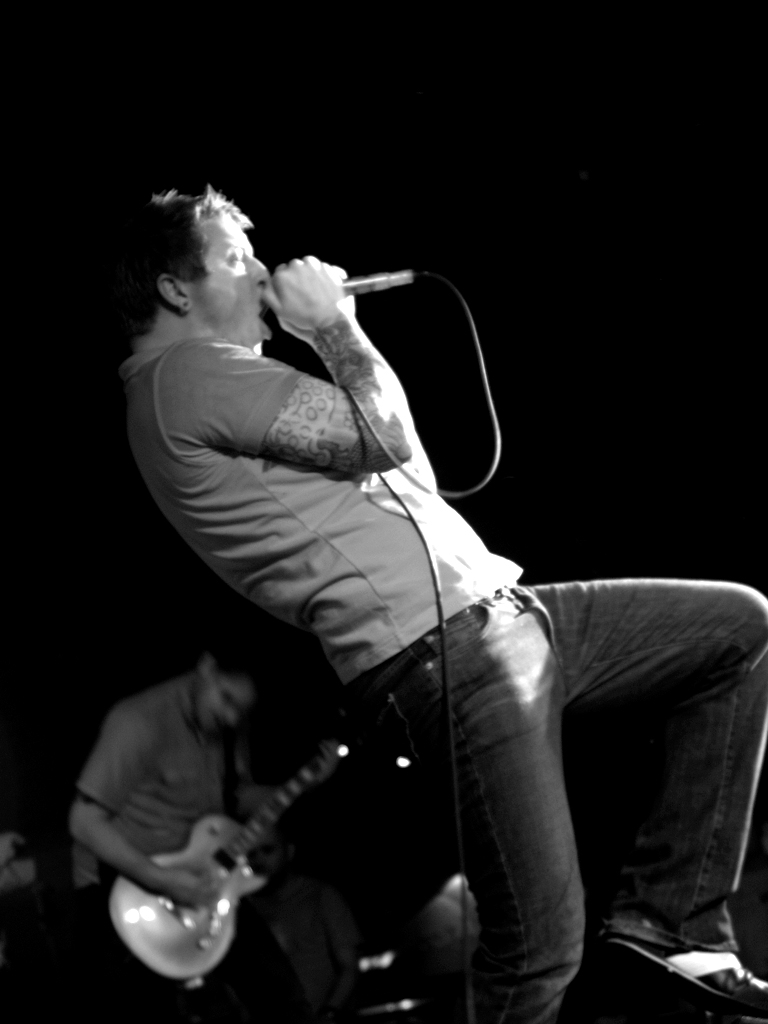
Former vocalist Alex Varkatzas

The band's second album, The Curse, was released in 2004, selling 450,000 copies. The band was then featured on the soundtrack to the film Mr. and Mrs. Smith with a cover of Bon Jovi's "You Give Love a Bad Name". Atreyu was also featured on the soundtrack to Underworld: Evolution with "Her Portrait in Black". "Right Side of the Bed" also appeared on Burnout 3: Takedown, a racing video game.

Atreyu released its third studio album, A Death-Grip on Yesterday, on March 28, 2006. The album peaked at number 9 on the Billboard 200, with sales of 69,000. The band gained further fame when the first single, "Ex's and Oh's" appeared on the soundtrack to Madden NFL 07. The album was said to have a balance of Brandon Saller's melodic singing vocals and Varkatzas's aggressive screaming, and it was met with positive reviews."

=== Signed to Hollywood Records (2007–2009) ===
In early 2007, Atreyu signed a record deal with Hollywood Records for America and an international deal with Roadrunner Records. With a new label, the band began to prepare its fourth studio album, Lead Sails Paper Anchor. A jigsaw puzzle was released on the band's website, as the goal was to put all the audio clips of the single "Becoming the Bull" into correct order, forming the whole song. Lead Sails Paper Anchor was released on August 28, 2007, and debuted at number 8 on the Billboard 200 with first-week sales of 43,000 copies. The American release of the album had a bonus track, a cover of the song "Epic" by Faith No More while the European and Australian bonus track was a cover of "Clean Sheets" by The Descendents. The album was received with mixed reviews, and was a notable change in sound for the band.

Atreyu toured in the United States on the Taste of Chaos 2008 tour, alongside bands such as Avenged Sevenfold, Bullet for My Valentine, D'espairsRay, Mucc, and Blessthefall. The band also toured with co-headliners Avenged Sevenfold and Bullet for My Valentine in Australia and New Zealand. They also played the United Kingdom Taste of Chaos tour, headlining with Story of the Year and As I Lay Dying.

On April 22, 2008, Lead Sails Paper Anchor was re-released with new cover art, two bonus tracks, a DVD, and a digital booklet. From July to August 2008, Atreyu headlined the Revolution Stage of Linkin Park's Projekt Revolution. Their setlist consisted of 45 minutes of various songs. With them on the stage were 10 Years, Hawthorne Heights, Armor for Sleep, and Street Drum Corps. Atreyu was also a part of the KROQ-FM Epicenter '09 Show where they did a meet and greet to benefit the non-profit organization Music Saves Lives.

=== Congregation of the Damned and Covers of the Damned (2009–2010) ===
Atreyu's fifth studio album, Congregation of the Damned, was released on October 27, 2009. The album, which was produced by Bob Marlette (who has worked with Ozzy Osbourne and Airbourne) and mixed by Rich Costey (who has worked with System of a Down and Rage Against the Machine), was said to be "darker" and "heavier" than the band's previous albums. According to lead singer Alex Varkatzas, the record is a "mix of everything we've ever done. For every song that's more melodic or rock-driven there's a total shit-kicker, and I think that's what makes us a well-rounded band." Atreyu has also described the album to "Make more sense than the other ones because they finally realize what they are".

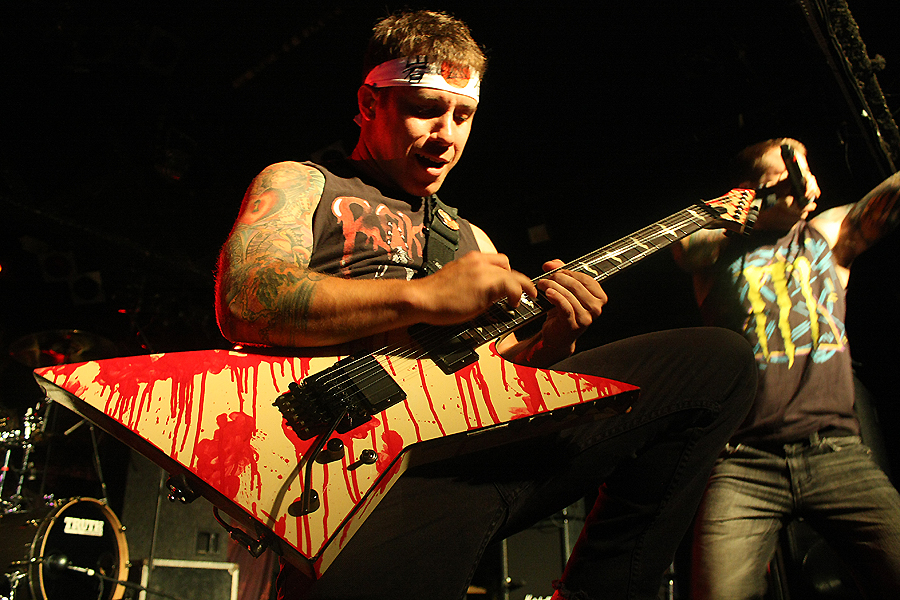
Guitarist Dan Jacobs performing a guitar solo in Spain

The band started a co-headlining tour with Hollywood Undead, Escape the Fate and The Sleeping in October, and as promotion of album debut songs like "Bleeding Is a Luxury" at K-Rockathon 14 in New York State Fairgrounds, Syracuse, New York., and "Gallows". Atreyu also promoted the album with five webisodes, released biweekly from September 1 to October 20. Congregation of The Damned debuted at No. 18 on the Billboard 200, selling 27,412 copies on its first week. Atreyu announced that they would be recording an EP Covers of the Damned with tourmates Chiodos, blessthefall, Endless Hallway, and Architects (UK). It was to be released on October 12, but was leaked on the internet on October 9. Atreyu toured Australia in November 2010 with the No Sleep Til Festival playing most locations with Dropkick Murphys, Alkaline Trio, Megadeth and many more. In December, along with Bring Me the Horizon they supported Bullet for My Valentine across the United Kingdom.

=== New projects and hiatus activities (2011–2013) ===
In January 2011, vocalist Alex Varkatzas confirmed, in a short series of Twitter postings, that the band was taking a break from touring and recording to "recharge and focus on other parts of our lives." In these same Twitter postings, Varkatzas also stated that he has been working on a new project with Bleeding Through vocalist Brandan Schieppati called I Am War.

Drummer and vocalist Brandon Saller's side project Hell or Highwater (formerly named "The Black Cloud Collective") has recorded an album titled Begin Again released on August 9, 2011. Saller is solely the lead vocalist in this band, and this album does not feature the same metalcore elements as those of Atreyu, voicing a sound similar to bands such as Breaking Benjamin and Three Days Grace, the band uses only clean vocals.

In December 2011, Travis Miguel added his own endeavors to the list of Atreyu side projects with Fake Figures and their release of the EP "Hail the Sycophants". This project features an all-star lineup which includes Miguel on guitar, Rus Martin (Hotwire), Robert Bradley (Scars of Tomorrow), and Justin Pointer and Heather Baker who were both former members of Nightfall, a project that bassist Marc McKnight played for in 2003 before joining Atreyu. As of July 2012, Steve Ludwig joined Fake Figures as their new drummer and for around 18 months between 2013 and 2014 Travis played as a touring guitarist with Trapt.

On May 11, 2013, the band posted a statement asking their Facebook fans to repost their message "if you want Atreyu to write a new song for your ears to bleed to.", with a second statement explaining that they hope to return to a sound more reminiscent of their second studio album, The Curse.

=== Official reunion and Long Live (2014–2017) ===
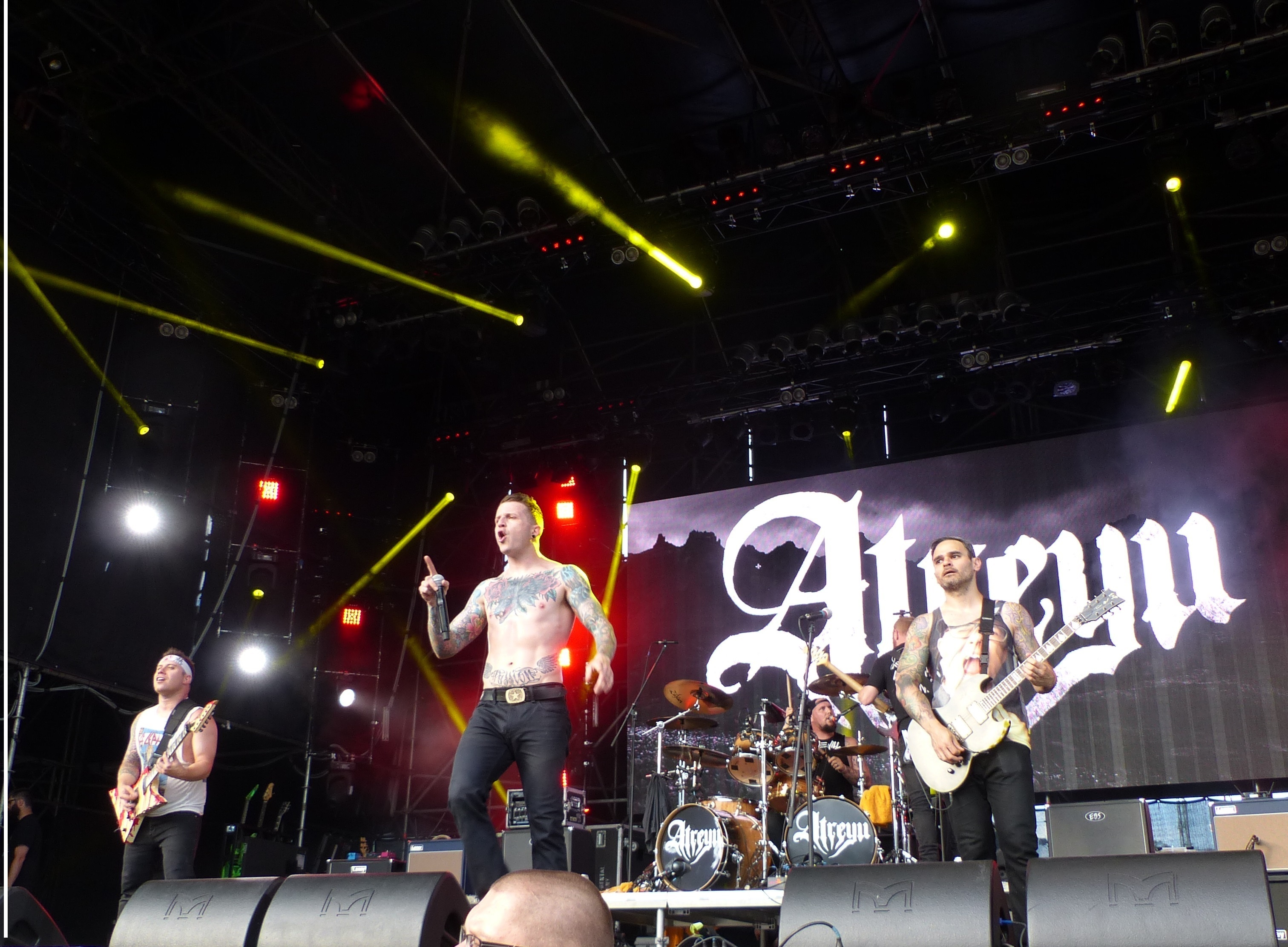
Atreyu performing in Budapest in 2016

On July 1, 2014, the band officially announced that they're back making new music. It was also announced that the band plans to play live again, starting with a headlining show at Chain Reaction on September 11, 2014, and an appearance at the Aftershock Festival on September 14, 2014.

On September 5, 2014, the band released a new song on their YouTube account titled "So Others May Live" and is available on their official website, free of charge. The band was announced as one of the acts to perform in the South by So What?! festival in March at QuikTrip Park in Grand Prairie.

Atreyu played in Slipknot's Knotfest on the weekend of October 25–26, 2014.

On April 18, 2015, a 7" vinyl was released exclusively for Record Store Day. "So Others May Live" was presented on the vinyl followed by a new song "When the Day Is Done". Only 1,000 copies were made.

In April 2015, the new album, titled Long Live was announced to be released in September. On July 17, 2015, the band released the video for their latest single, "Long Live", via YouTube.

On September 18, 2015, the album Long Live was released. It peaked at number 26 on the Billboard 200.

=== In Our Wake and departure of Alex Varkatzas (2018–2020) ===
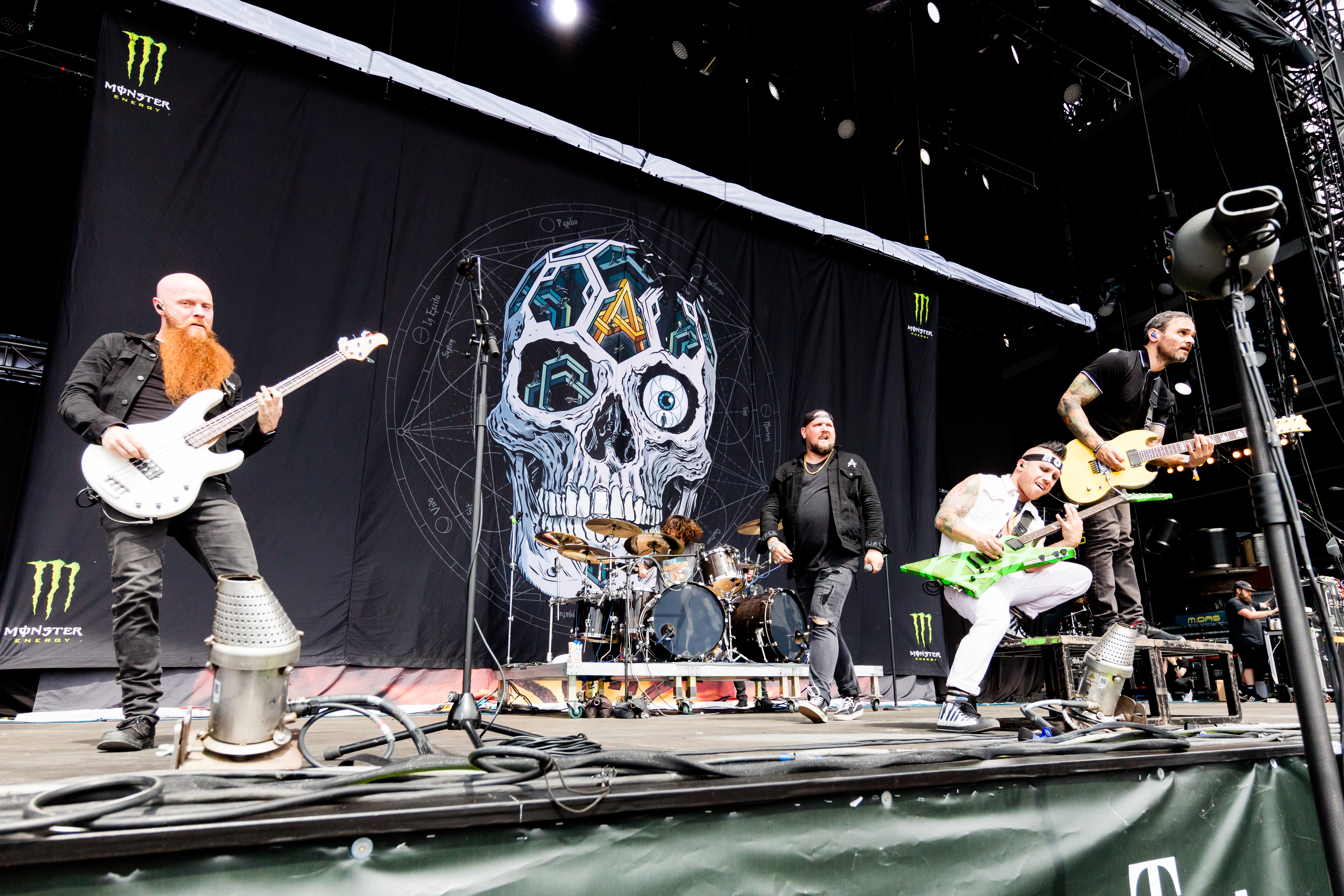
Atreyu performing at Rock am Ring in 2019

On May 22, 2018, Metal Injection reported that Atreyu frontman Alex Varkatzas had sat down with HardDrive Radio's Lou Brutus at Rock on the Range, and implied a possible new album will drop in the fall of 2018.

On August 23, 2018, Atreyu released a single titled "Anger Left Behind" and announced that their upcoming album In Our Wake will be released on October 12, 2018. As of September 11, Atreyu has released 3 singles including Anger Left Behind, In Our Wake, and The Time Is Now including a music video for the song In Our Wake. Atreyu did a tour to support In Our Wake throughout the Fall of 2018. Memphis May Fire, Ice Nine Kills and Sleep Signals all joined up as support.

On August 19, 2019, Atreyu announced an anniversary tour to celebrate 20 years since the band's formation. The setlist for the tour was a 20-song setlist and was chosen by fans in an online poll. The tour spanned 27 cities and featured support from Whitechapel, He Is Legend, Tempting Fate, and Santa Cruz.

In late August 2020, it was rumored that vocalist Alex Varkatzas had left the band. After some uncertainty following these reports, the band officially announced that they were parting ways with Varkatzas a month later on September 30.

=== Baptize (2020–2023) ===
In October 2020, the band released a single titled "Save Us". They also announced several lineup changes, including the addition of new drummer Kyle Rosa, as Brandon Saller would focus on clean singing only. Meanwhile, bassist Marc McKnight would take over screaming vocals.

On March 4, 2021, the band announced that their eighth studio album Baptize would be released on June 4, 2021, through Spinefarm Records. Ahead of the release, they also released two singles: "Warrior" featuring Blink-182 drummer Travis Barker and "Underrated".

=== The Beautiful Dark of Life and The End Is Not The End (2023–present) ===
On April 17, 2023, the band released an EP titled The Hope of a Spark. On August 18, the band released a second EP, The Moment You Find Your Flame, and revealed there would be a series of EPs released in 2023, in which all the songs would end up on The Beautiful Dark of Life, which is their next full-length album, due by the end of the year. The third and final EP of the series, A Touch in the Dark, was released on November 3. That same day, it was revealed The Beautiful Dark of Life would be released on December 8.

On August 1, 2025, the band released a re-recorded version of The Curse. The updated version features Saller and McKnight on vocals rather than the band's original vocal lineup of Varkatzas and Saller.

In February 2026, the band was announced as part of the lineup for the Louder Than Life music festival in Louisville, scheduled to take place in September. The band also made an appearance at Welcome to Rockville, which took place in Daytona Beach, Florida in May 2026. Additionally, they will make an appearance on the 2026 Vans Warped Tour.

== Musical style and influences ==
Atreyu has been described as metalcore, alternative metal, post-hardcore, and hard rock. According to Adrien Begrand of PopMatters, "Atreyu is too goth to be emo, too metal to be punk, and too brazenly emotional to be metal". According to Begrand, Atreyu's music often features elements of heavy metal, psychedelic rock, gothic rock, hardcore punk, thrash metal, blues rock, emo, hard rock, screamo and melodic death metal.

In an interview, guitarist Dan Jacobs stated he is a really big '80s rock fan. He then went on to quote "I love all that stuff and I think that is one generation where music was done right and I try to apply that as much as possible to our music". He also went on to discuss Atreyu's influence from the Gothenburg metal scene. A few bands he mentioned that the band loves are: Arch Enemy, In Flames, Soilwork, and all those type of bands. In an interview with Metal Underground, bassist Porter McKnight spoke of his influences:

I'm a huge fan of Johnny Cash and all that kind of music. All the way through to like Bleeding Through and stuff, well I wouldn't say they're an influence I guess because they're kind of new. I would say that most people or bands now have kind of stemmed out from Green Day and I can say that if it weren't for them, love 'em or hate 'em, a lot of these bands now wouldn't be existing. So I wouldn't say it was mostly musical influence but it got me off my ass and made me want to write ya know?

Other influences they have cited including Grade, Refused, Cradle of Filth, Warzone, Poison the Well, God Forbid, the Vandals, Bad Religion, Hot Water Music, Jimmy Eat World, AFI, Saves the Day, the Haunted, Arch Enemy, the Joykiller, the Adicts, Underoath, Darkest Hour, Slayer, Sick of It All, Pantera, Braid, NOFX, Rancid, Sonata Arctica, Queen, Van Halen, Warrant, Def Leppard, Whitesnake, Aerosmith, Mötley Crüe, Rocket From the Crypt, Deftones, Metallica, Judas Priest, the Four Seasons, Revolution, emo, Far, Alice in Chains, Soundgarden, Failure, MC5, the Stooges, Black Flag, Queens of the Stone Age, Nine Inch Nails, White Zombie, David Bowie, Will Haven, Sepultura, Hatebreed, Mogwai, the Smiths, Outkast, the Police, Elvis Costello, Alkaline Trio, Ink & Dagger, Cave In, Hatebreed, Iron Maiden and glam metal.

In an interview with Rock Sound, frontman Alex Varkatzas stated

This is going to sound a little cocky but I'm a singer in a band. I don't think we fit into any genre. I think we are hard to pin down. When we first started it was a little easier. We were a metallic hardcore band with singing parts. There wasn't any else like that when we were doing it. People get confused and say 'you're a metalcore band', but we invented metalcore. That may sound cocky but I don't care. We pre-date Poison the Well and Killswitch Engage and all those bands. I've been doing this since I was literally 12 years old.

== Band members ==
Atreyu at Rock am Ring, Germany in 2019.
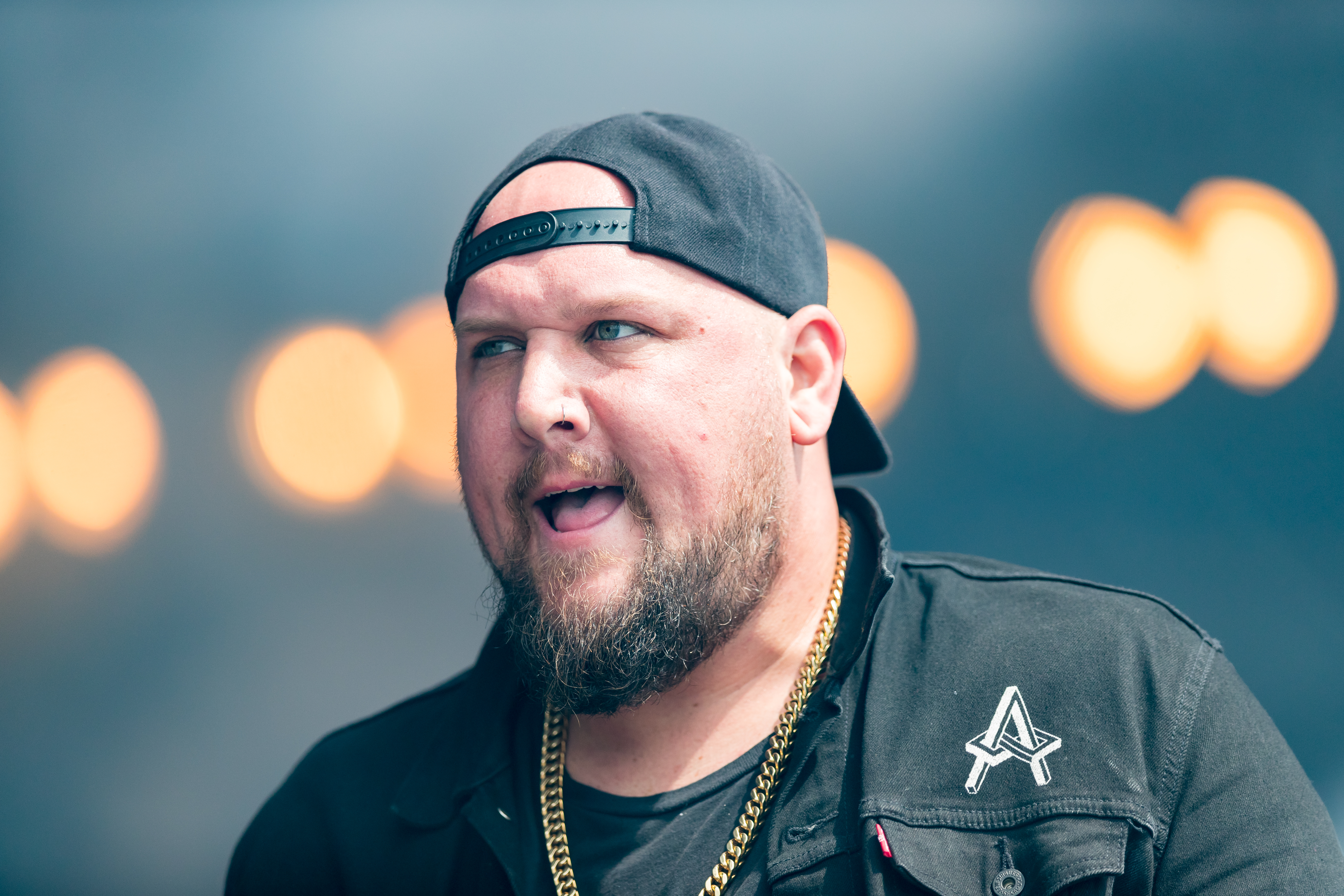
Brandon Saller

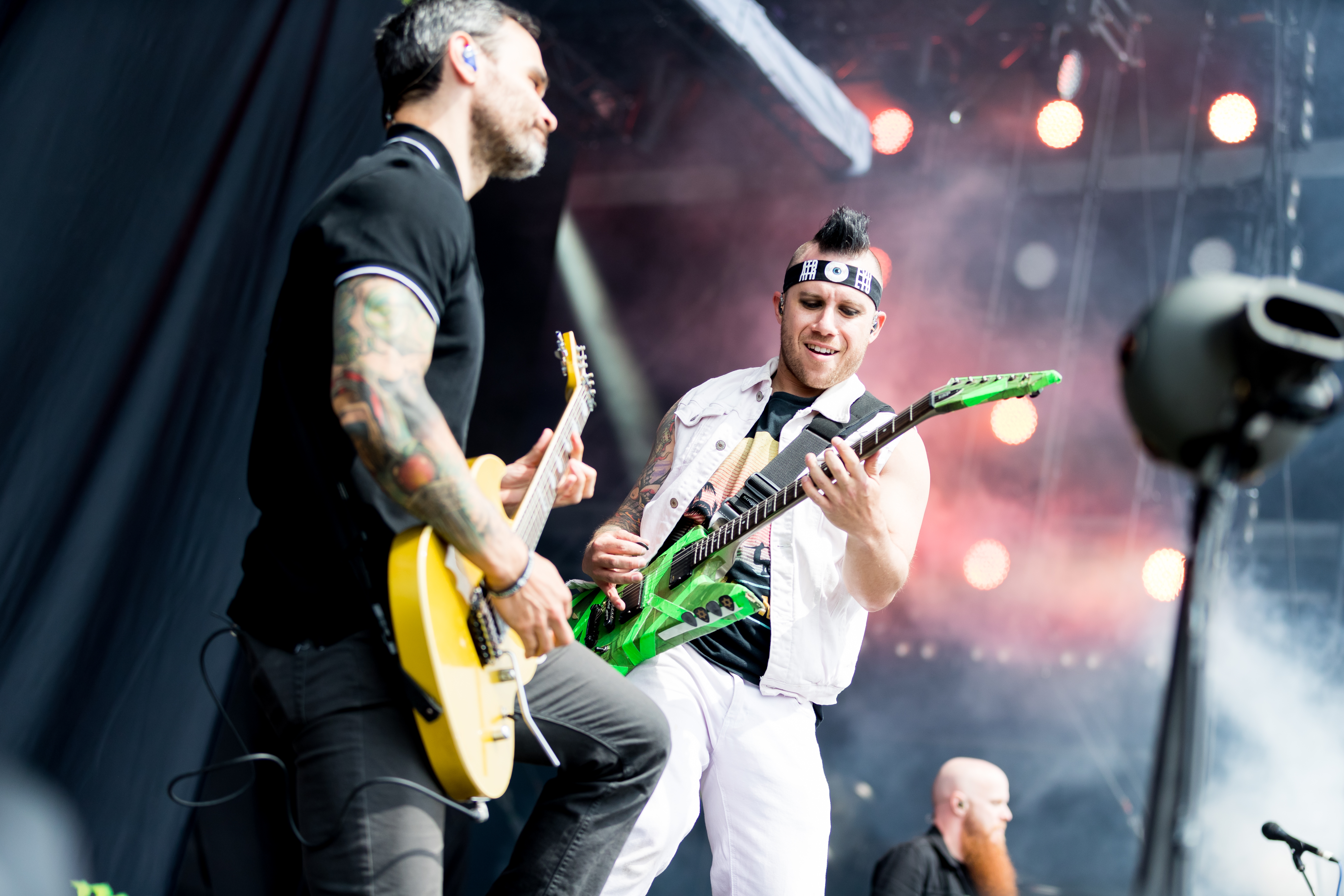
Travis Miguel (left) and Dan Jacobs (right)

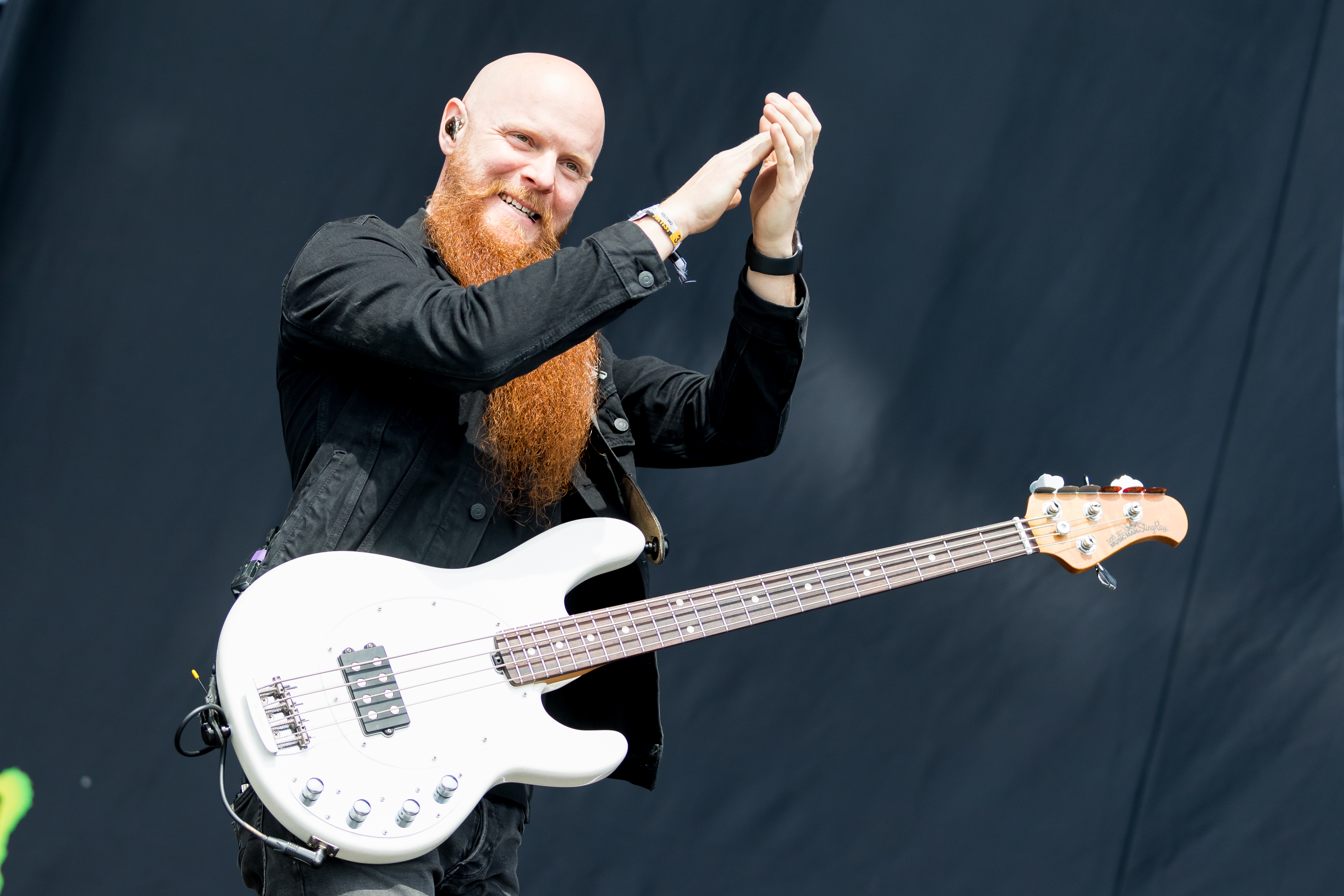
Porter McKnight

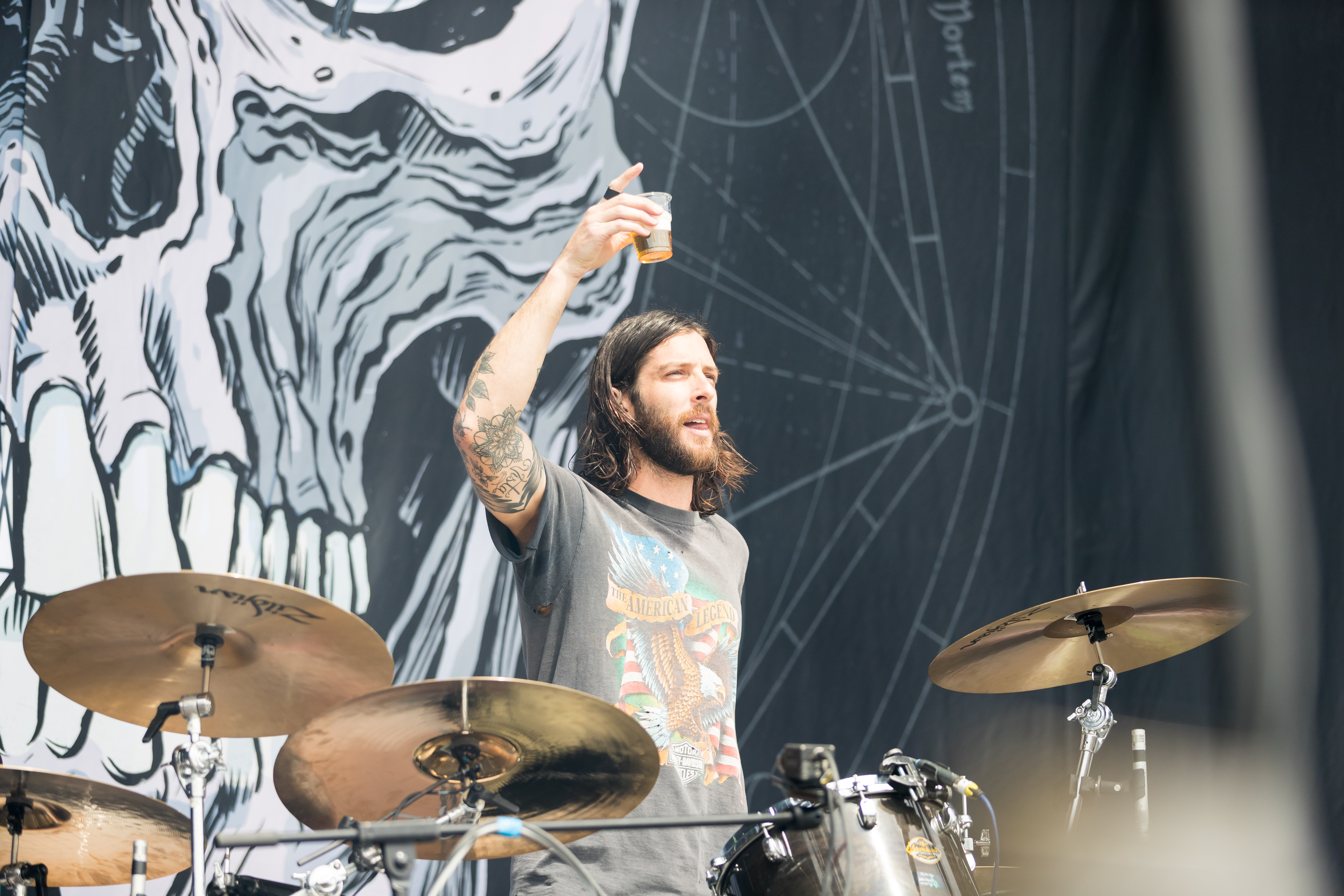
Kyle Rosa

Current

- Dan Jacobs – guitar, backing vocals (1998–2011, 2014–present)
- Brandon Saller – clean vocals, keyboards, piano, programming, additional guitar (2001–2011, 2014–present); drums (1998–2011, 2014–2020), additional unclean vocals (2020–present)
- Travis Miguel – guitar, backing vocals (2000–2011, 2014–present)
- Marc "Porter" McKnight – bass, backing vocals (2004–2011, 2014–present), unclean vocals (2020–present)
- Kyle Rosa – drums, backing vocals (2020–2024, 2025–present; touring 2019)

Former

- Alex Varkatzas – unclean vocals (1998–2011, 2014–2020), additional clean vocals (2004–2011, 2014–2020)
- Brian O'Donnell – bass (1998)
- Kyle Stanley – bass (1999–2001)
- Chris Thomson – bass (2001–2004)

Former touring musicians

- Johnny Concannon – drums (2024–2025)

Timeline

== Discography ==
Studio albums

- Suicide Notes and Butterfly Kisses (2002)
- The Curse (2004)
- A Death-Grip on Yesterday (2006)
- Lead Sails Paper Anchor (2007)
- Congregation of the Damned (2009)
- Long Live (2015)
- In Our Wake (2018)
- Baptize (2021)
- The Beautiful Dark of Life (2023)
- The End Is Not the End (2026)
