= Brandon Saller =

American musician (born 1983)

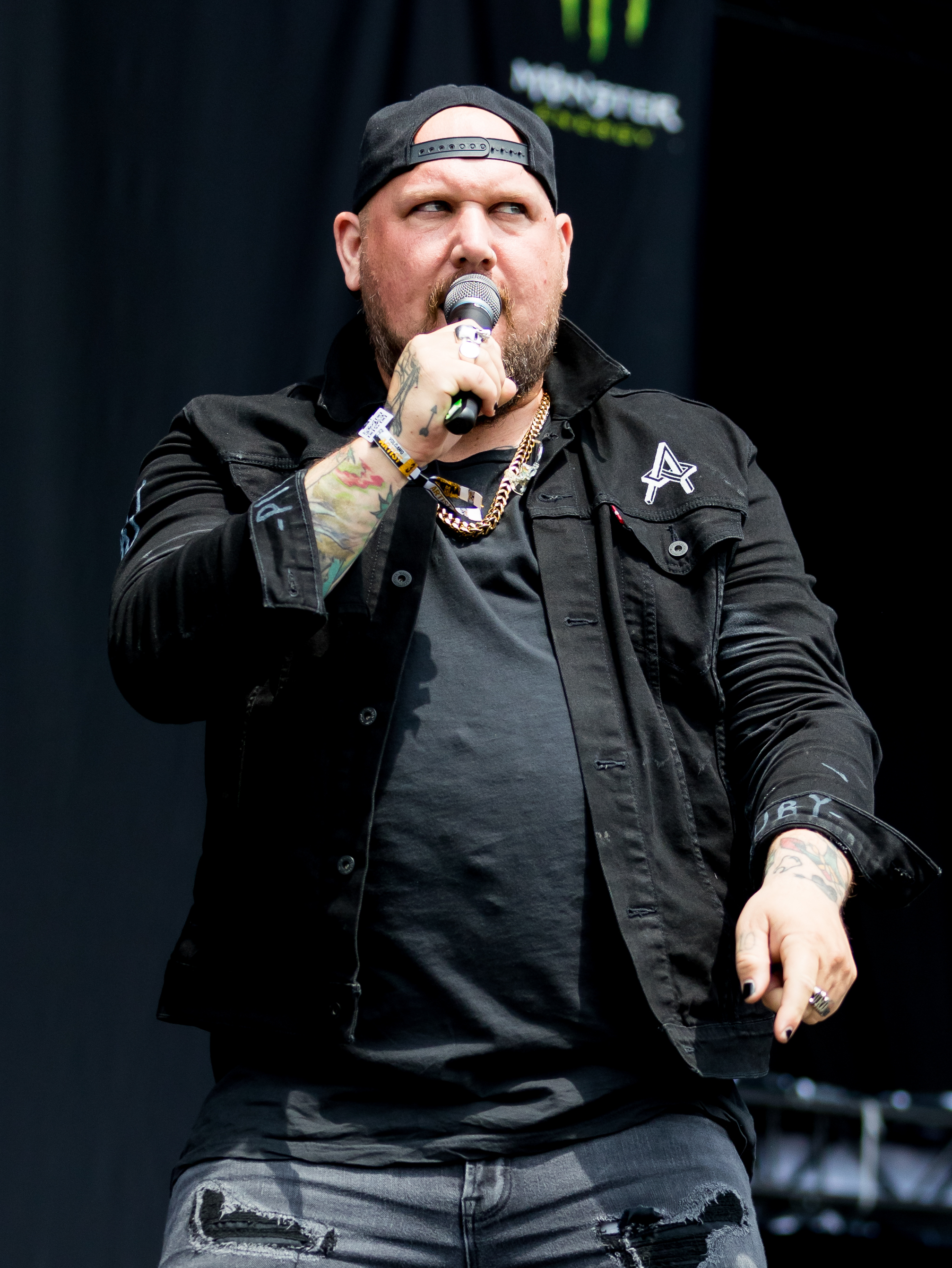
- Saller at Rock am Ring 2019

Background information
- Born: June 24, 1983 (age 43); Los Angeles, California, U.S.
- Origin: Orange County, California, U.S.
- Genres: Post-hardcore; melodic metalcore; alternative rock; hard rock; alternative metal
- Occupation: Musician
- Instruments: Vocals; drums; keyboards; programming; guitar
- Label: Hollywood
- Member of: Atreyu; Hell or Highwater

Brandon Kyle Saller (born June 24, 1983) is an American musician, singer and multi-instrumentalist. He is best known as the vocalist, keyboardist and former drummer of the rock band Atreyu, of which he is also a founding member. He is the band's primary songwriter, along with guitarist Dan Jacobs, as well as its clean vocalist. Following Atreyu's hiatus in 2011, Saller focused on his side project Hell or Highwater, where he is the lead vocalist. In 2011, the group released their debut album, Begin Again, in 2011. The band released an EP, The Other Side, in August 2013. Saller returned to Atreyu in 2014 and has remained a full-time member of the group since. He became the lead vocalist of the band after original singer Alex Varkatzas announced his departure.

== Atreyu ==
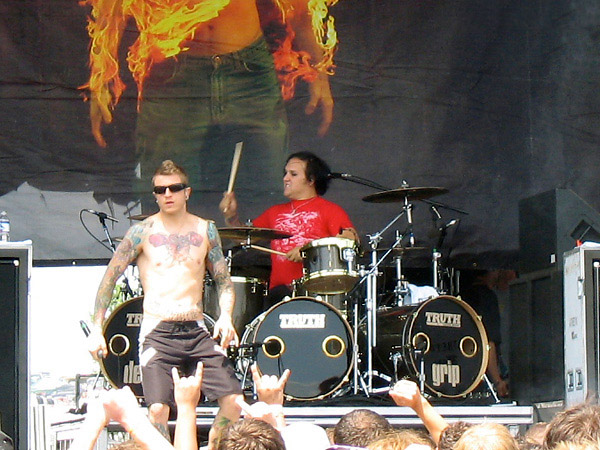
Saller (on drums) with Alex Varkatzas in 2006

At 13, Saller was invited by his older brother Ryan to join a band started by some of his friends, Dan Jacobs and Alex Varkatzas. The three of them formed a street punk band called Retribution, which by 1998, had adapted a heavier sound and changed names to Atreyu after the main character of The Neverending Story. The band signed to Victory Records in 2001 and released 3 albums under the label, Suicide Notes and Butterfly Kisses in 2002, The Curse in 2004, and A Death-Grip on Yesterday in 2006. The band later joined major label Hollywood Records and released 2007's Lead Sails Paper Anchor and 2009's Congregation of the Damned. After over 10 years of worldwide success, the band embarked on hiatus, but returned in 2014. They released their sixth studio album, Long Live in 2015.

=== Vocal duties ===
Saller did not sing on the band's 1998 EP, Visions, as he only played drums for the band at that time. Between Visions and Fractures in the Facade of Your Porcelain Beauty, Saller learned to sing while playing drums and became the band's clean vocalist. On Suicide Notes and Butterfly Kisses, his vocals were largely confined to choruses, however, as Atreyu's career went on, Saller's vocals would get more and more frequent, and they would become a major part of Atreyu's sound. After vocalist Alex Varkatzas departed the band in 2020, Saller began performing as the band's primary vocalist alongside Porter McKnight.

== Hell or Highwater ==
Formerly the Black Cloud Collective, Hell or Highwater resulted out of Saller's solo material and eventually became a full band. He is solely the band's vocalist. The band released their debut album, Begin Again, independently on iTunes in 2011. After touring for over a year, the band recouped and released an EP, entitled The Other Side in August 2013. May 19, 2017, the band released their 2nd LP "Vista". Available on iTunes.

== Equipment ==
=== Early days ===
In the early days of Atreyu, Saller used Spaun Custom Drums and Zildjian cymbals. He would later endorse Istanbul cymbals in late 2004.

Drums

22x20 Kick

12x8 Rack Tom

16x16 Floor Tom

13x7 Snare Drum

Cymbals

14" A New Beat Hi Hats

18" A Custom Projection Crash

19" A Custom Projection Crash

20" A Custom Projection Ride

18" China Boy High

Brandon also used a set of 14" A Custom Mastersound Hi Hats, an 18" oriental China Trash, a 6" Zil Bel, and two 19" Z Custom crashes throughout the early days of Atreyu. With Istanbul, Saller used the Alchemy series. He used a set of 15" hi hats, two 20" crashes, a 20" ride, and a 20" china.

=== 2006 to 2010 ===
In 2006, Saller endorsed Truth Custom Drums and Zildjian cymbals, of which he had an iconic black acrylic drum kit that featured three bass drums.

Drums

22x20 Bass Drum (3x)

10x7 Rack Tom (added on in 2009)

12x8 Rack Tom (added on in 2007)

13x9 Rack Tom

16x16 Floor Tom

18x16 Floor Tom

14x8 Snare Drum

Cymbals

15" A New Beat Hi Hats

19" A Custom Medium Crash

20" A Custom Medium Crash

19" K Custom Hybrid Crash

20" A Custom Projection Ride

12" A Custom Splash

20" China Boy High

=== 2014–present ===
When Atreyu reformed in 2014, Truth created a new drum kit for Saller for use on the Aftershock and Knotfest festivals, as well as to record Atreyu's 2015 album, Long Live

24x16 Kick Drums (3x)

10x7 Rack Tom

12x8 Rack Tom

13x9 Rack Tom

16x16 Floor Tom

18x16 Floor Tom

14x8 Brandon Saller Signature Snare

Saller also uses Remo Drumheads, DW hardware, DW 9000 pedals, and Vic Firth drumsticks.
