= Alex Varkatzas =

American singer (born 1982)

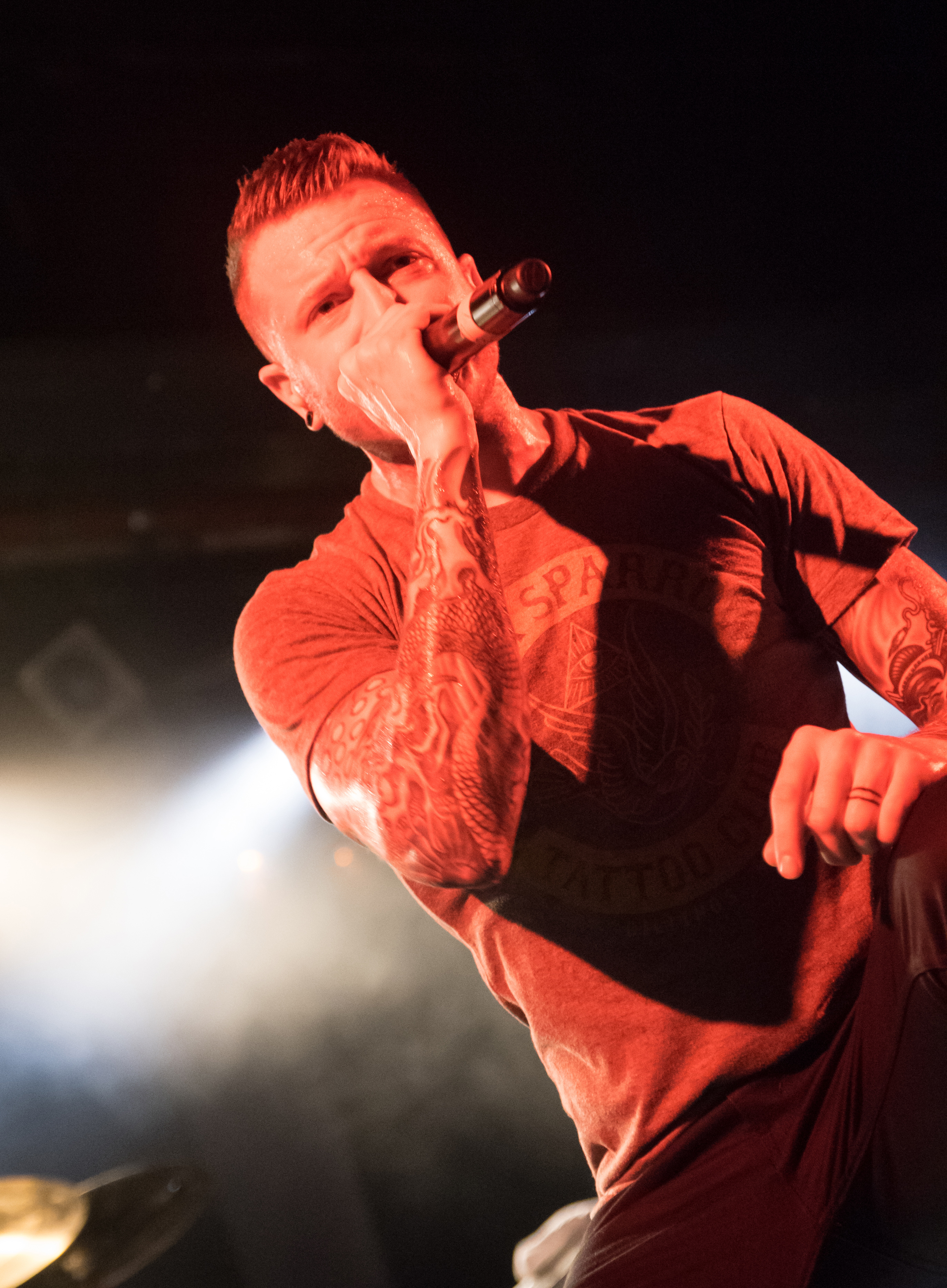
- Varkatzas with Atreyu in 2016

Background information
- Born: Ektor; January 17, 1982 (age 44)
- Genres: Metalcore; post-hardcore; hard rock
- Occupation: Singer
- Member of: Dead Icarus; I Am War
- Formerly of: Atreyu

Alex Varkatzas (born January 17, 1982) is an American musician, best known as the former lead vocalist of rock band Atreyu from its inception in 1998 until his departure from the band in 2020. In 2011, during the band's hiatus, Varkatzas also started a hardcore project with Bleeding Through vocalist Brandan Schieppati named I Am War. He is currently the vocalist for Dead Icarus.

== Atreyu ==
At 14, Varkatzas, along with guitarist Dan Jacobs and drummer Brandon Saller, formed a punk band called Retribution. By 1998, when Varkatzas was 16, Retribution developed a heavier style and changed names to Atreyu, as seen on their 1998 independent release, Visions. After their 2001 EP, Fractures in the Facade of Your Porcelain Beauty, fell into the hands of Victory Records, the band signed to Victory and released their debut album, Suicide Notes and Butterfly Kisses in 2002. Since then, the band has released four other albums before embarking on hiatus,: The Curse in 2004, A Death-Grip on Yesterday in 2006, Lead Sails Paper Anchor in 2007, and Congregation of the Damned in 2009. After ten years of worldwide success, the band went on hiatus.

On July 1, 2014, the band officially announced their return from hiatus by playing several festivals including Aftershock and Slipknot's Knotfest. A new single was released on their official YouTube channel titled "So Others May Live" and plans for a new album titled "Long Live". Long Live was released on September 18, 2015. Furthermore, a second album called "In Our Wake" was released on October 12, 2018. 3 singles have been released so far including a music Video for the song In our wake. Another single, “Super Hero” was written by the band, along with Aaron Gillespie of Underoath and M. Shadows of Avenged Sevenfold providing guest vocals in the verses.

On August 22, 2020, news began circulating that Varkatzas had parted ways with Atreyu; though, the singer himself later confirmed that it was just a rumor. However, on September 30, 2020, Varkatzas and Atreyu both released statements confirming his departure.

== I Am War ==
After Atreyu went on a hiatus in 2011, Varkatzas started a hardcore project named I Am War with Brandan Schieppati of Bleeding Through. The band released an album entitled Outlive You All in 2012.

== Dead Icarus ==
In June 2021, Varkatzas announced the name of his new band, Dead Icarus.

On August 11, 2023, the band released their first single, "Sellout", and announced they had signed with MNRK Heavy. The band would release their debut EP titled Ad Infernum on March 13, 2024, and their debut studio album titled ZEALOT on October 31, 2024.

Dead Icarus consists of himself, Gabe Mangold (guitarist for Enterprise Earth) and Brandon Zackey (drummer for Whitechapel).
