= Blessthefall discography =

Discography

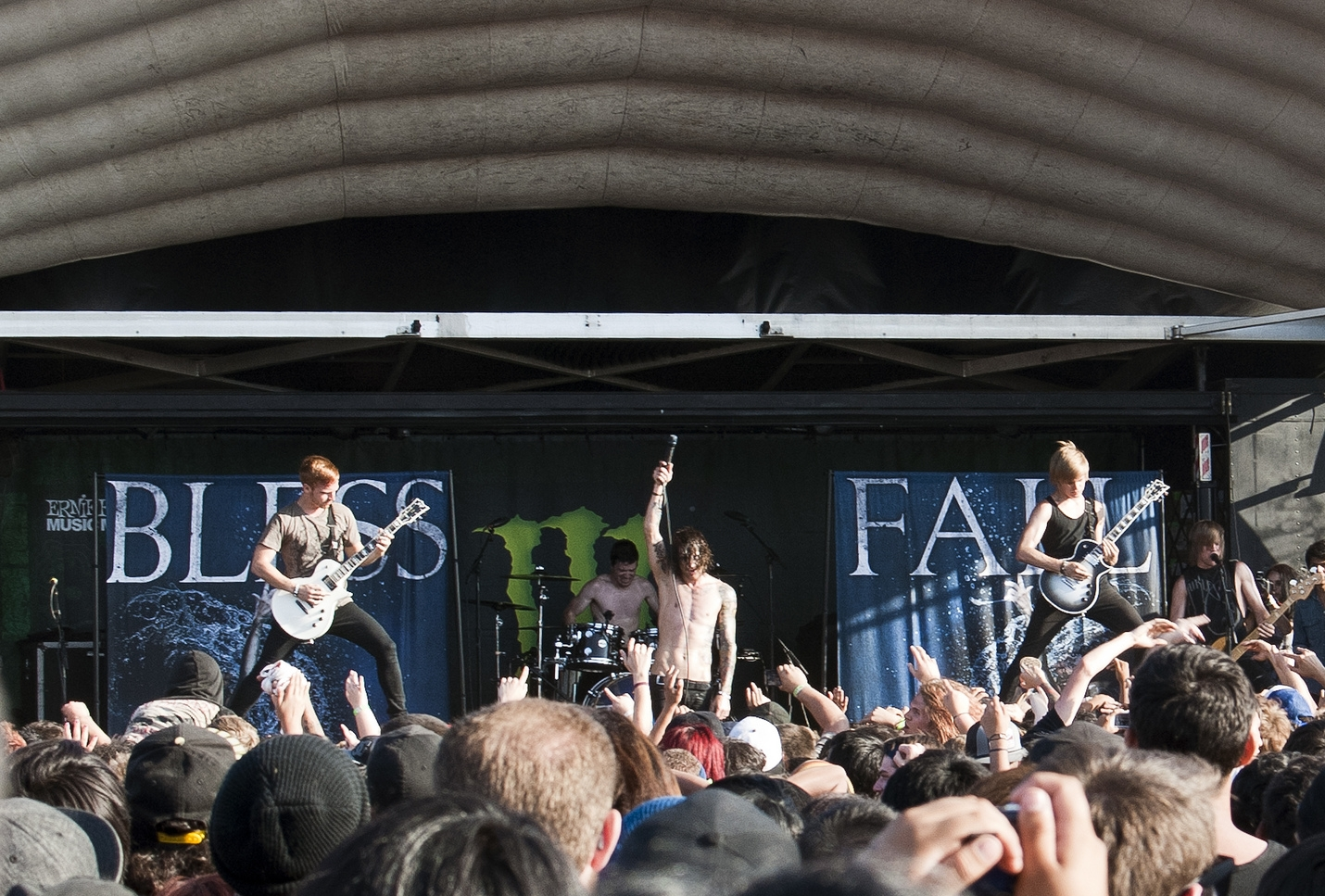
- Blessthefall live at Vans Warped Tour 2012
- Studio albums: 7
- Extended plays: 2
- Singles: 23
- Music videos: 25

Blessthefall is an American metalcore band from Phoenix, Arizona, formed in 2004. They have released seven studio albums, two extended plays, twenty three singles and twenty five music videos.

== Studio albums ==
| Title | Album details | Peak chart positions | | | | | | |
| Title | Album details | US | US Alt | US Heat | US Hard Rock | US Indie | US Rock | AUS |
|---|---|---|---|---|---|---|---|---|
| His Last Walk | Released: November 7, 2006; Label: Ferret, Science; Format: CD, digital download | — | — | 32 | — | — | — | — |
| Witness | Released: October 6, 2009; Label: Fearless; Format: CD, digital download | 56 | 13 | — | 9 | 6 | 25 | — |
| Awakening | Released: October 4, 2011; Label: Fearless; Format: CD, digital download | 32 | 11 | — | 3 | 7 | 13 | — |
| Hollow Bodies | Released: August 20, 2013; Label: Fearless; Format: CD, digital download | 15 | 2 | — | 1 | 3 | 4 | — |
| To Those Left Behind | Released: September 18, 2015; Label: Fearless; Format: CD, digital download | 23 | 5 | — | 3 | 5 | 8 | 98 |
| Hard Feelings | Released: March 23, 2018; Label: Rise; Format: CD, digital download | 54 | 4 | — | 2 | 1 | 5 | — |
| Gallows | Released: September 5, 2025; Label: Rise; Format: CD, digital download | — | — | — | — | — | — | — |
"—" denotes a release that did not chart

== Extended plays ==
| Title | Extended play details |
|---|---|
| Black Rose Dying | Released: 2005; Label: Self-released; Format: Digital download |
| Blessthefall | Released: November 21, 2006; Label: Record Collection; Format: CD |

== Singles ==
| Year | Single | Album |
|---|---|---|
| 2006 | "Higinia" | His Last Walk |
| 2007 | "Guys Like You Make Us Look Bad" | His Last Walk |
| 2007 | "A Message to the Unknown" | His Last Walk |
| 2007 | "Rise Up" | His Last Walk |
| 2008 | "I Wouldn't Quit If Everyone Quit" | His Last Walk (Reissue) |
| 2009 | "To Hell & Back" | Witness |
| 2009 | "God Wears Gucci" | Witness |
| 2009 | "What's Left of Me" | Witness |
| 2010 | "Hey Baby, Here's That Song You Wanted" | Witness |
| 2011 | "Bottomfeeder" | Awakening |
| 2011 | "Promised Ones" | Awakening |
| 2011 | "40 Days..." | Awakening |
| 2013 | "You Wear a Crown But You're No King" | Hollow Bodies |
| 2013 | "Déjà Vu" | Hollow Bodies |
| 2015 | "Up in Flames" | To Those Left Behind |
| 2015 | "Walk on Water" | To Those Left Behind |
| 2018 | "Melodramatic" | Hard Feelings |
| 2018 | "Wishful Sinking" | Hard Feelings |
| 2018 | "Cutthroat" | Hard Feelings |
| 2023 | "Wake the Dead" | Gallows |
| 2024 | "DRAG ME UNDER" (feat. Lochie Keogh of Alpha Wolf) | Gallows |
| 2025 | "Mallxcore" | Gallows |
| 2025 | "Fell So Hard, Felt So Right" (feat. Dan Marsala of Story of the Year) | Gallows |

=== As featured artist ===
| Year | Title | Album |
|---|---|---|
| 2019 | "Before the Storm" (Kayzo featuring Blessthefall) | Unleashed |

== Music videos ==
| Year | Title | Director(s) | Album |
|---|---|---|---|
| 2005 | "Black Rose Dying" | Brittany Bush | Black Rose Dying (EP) |
| 2006 | "Times Like These" | Unknown | Blessthefall (EP) |
| 2007 | "Higinia" | Unknown | His Last Walk |
| 2007 | "Guys Like You Make Us Look Bad" | Endeavor Media | His Last Walk |
| 2008 | "Rise Up" | Travis Kopach | His Last Walk |
| 2009 | "What's Left of Me" | Unknown | Witness |
| 2010 | "To Hell & Back" | Hannah Lux Davis | Witness |
| 2010 | "Hey Baby, Here's That Song You Wanted" | Chris Marrs Piliero | Witness |
| 2011 | "Promised Ones" | Unknown | Awakening |
| 2011 | "Bottomfeeder" | Unknown | Awakening |
| 2012 | "The Reign (Live)" | Unknown | Awakening |
| 2012 | "40 Days..." | Drew Russ | Awakening |
| 2013 | "You Wear a Crown But You're No King" | Brad Golowin | Hollow Bodies |
| 2014 | "Hollow Bodies" | Daniel Davison | Hollow Bodies |
| 2015 | "Walk on Water" | Raul Gonzo | To Those Left Behind |
| 2016 | "Oathbreaker (Live)" | Unknown | To Those Left Behind |
| 2017 | "Dead Air" | Mathis Arnell | To Those Left Behind |
| 2018 | "Melodramatic" | Unknown | Hard Feelings |
| 2018 | "Sleepless in Phoenix" | Dan Fusselman | Hard Feelings |
| 2018 | "Wishful Sinking" | Dan Fusselman | Hard Feelings |
| 2019 | "Welcome Home" | Unknown | Hard Feelings |
| 2023 | "Wake the Dead" | Daniel Davison and Tes Hash | Gallows |
| 2024 | "Drag Me Under" | Jake Johnston | Gallows |
| 2025 | "Mallxcore" | Tanner James Gordon | Gallows |
| 2025 | "Fell So Hard, Felt So Right" | Beau Bokan & Elliott Gruenberg | Gallows |
