= Joel Wanasek =

American record producer

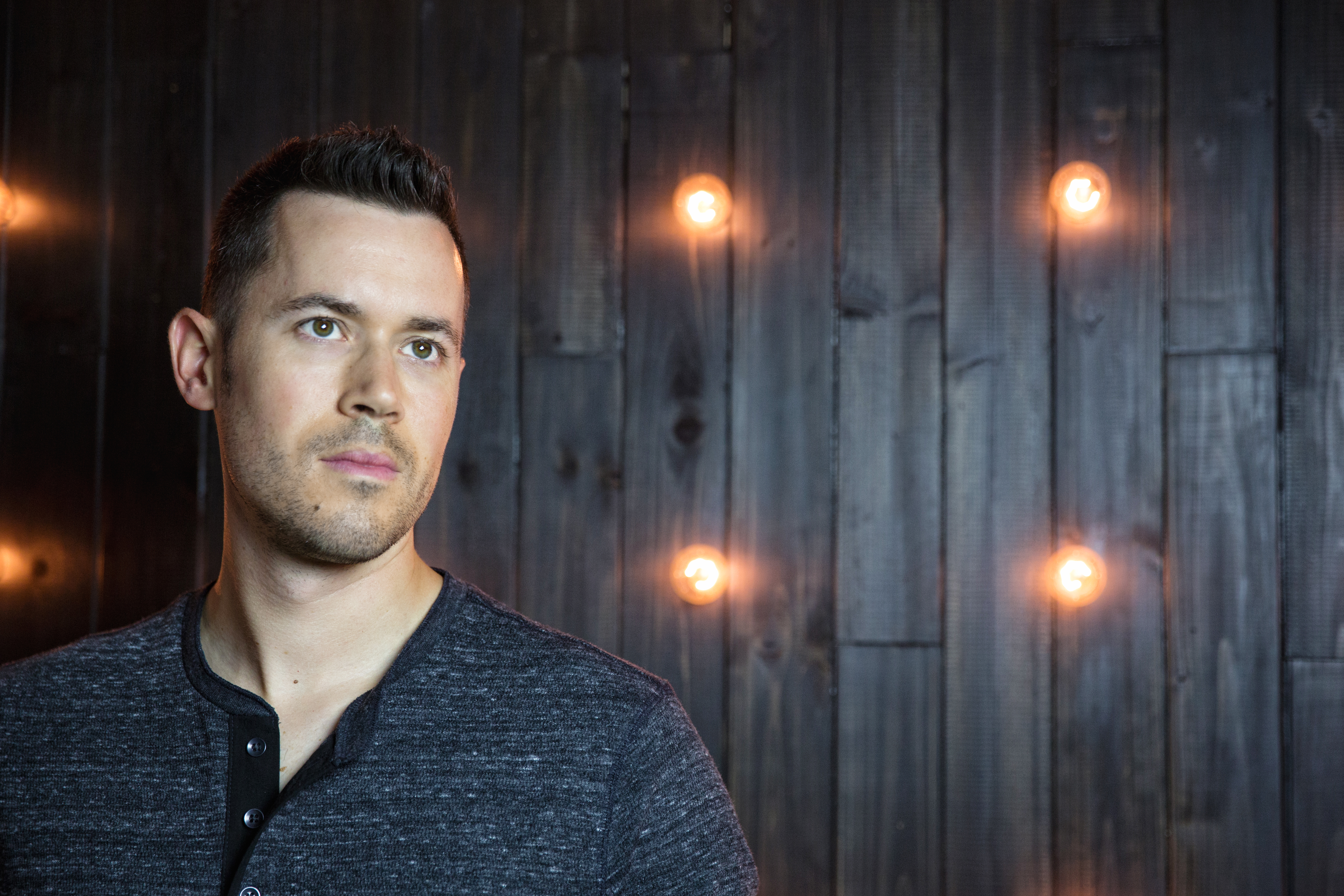
- Wanasek in 2017

Background information
- Born: Milwaukee, Wisconsin, U.S.
- Genres: Rock, heavy metal, death metal, metalcore
- Occupations: Mixing engineer, record producer, audio engineer, mastering engineer, entrepreneur
- Years active: 2006–present
- Website: mixedbyjoel.com

Joel Thomas Wanasek is an American record producer and owner of JTW Recording (Note: Alternatively referred to as JTW Music) in Milwaukee, Wisconsin. Wanasek started recording in 2002, initially as a self-taught producer, but by January 2006, he was able to quit his job and professionally dedicate to his recording business.

Primarily working with rock and metal bands, Wanasek has worked with numerous bands such as Blessthefall, Machine Head, Attila, Miss May I and Monuments, amongst others.

== Career and education ==
Wanasek started playing violin at the age of 10, and guitar at the age of 12. He was inspired to practice by Randy Rhoads, forming a band called Crystal Reign which lasted for a number of years. He earned a Bachelor of Business Administration at the University of Wisconsin-Whitewater

He created the now defunct instructional guitar web site InsaneGuitar.com, before forming his band Dark Shift in 2000, where he played lead guitar. They signed to AJA Records, but disbanded before releasing an album. Joel worked on Dark Shift's debut album "The Assault" which was released in June 2003. The band would then open up for Gigantour in Milwaukee, which featured Megadeth, Dream Theater, Symphony X, among others.

In his producing career, he has worked with labels such as Fueled by Ramen, Virgin Music, Century Media Records, No Sleep Records, Fearless Records, Nuclear Blast Records, among others. In 2016, the song "Is There Anybody Out There?" by Machine Head charted at #36 on Billboard's Hot Mainstream Rock, which he co-produced. In 2018, Wanasek mixed and mastered Miyavi's "Samurai Sessions Vol.2", with the opening song, "Dancing With My Fingers", topping the iTunes Japanese charts.

He uses Steinberg Cubase as his digital audio workstation.

== Entrepreneurship ==
=== Unstoppable Recording Machine ===
URM Academy is an online audio school created by Wanasek, Joey Sturgis and Eyal Levi, which describes itself as "the world's best online music school for rock & metal producers". Through its program Nail The Mix, the platform offers monthly mixing sessions with professionally-recorded songs and livestream commentary from the producer who originally mixed them. The program has featured bands such as Lamb of God, Asking Alexandria, The Devil Wears Prada, Chelsea Grin, Born of Osiris, A Day to Remember, Opeth, Neck Deep, Papa Roach, Meshuggah, Periphery, Gojira, etc. and producers such as Andrew Wade, Tue Madsen, Devin Townsend, Logan Mader, Jens Bogren, Kane Churko, Machine, among others. Nail the Mix won two "2 Commas Club Awards" from ClickFunnels for "entrepreneurs who have used ClickFunnels to grow their business to the 7-figure mark". The platform also offers a podcast, Q&As, lessons ("Fast Track") and, as part of its Enhanced subscription, "Mix Rescue", where students submit their own mixes to be critiqued and cleaned-up during a live broadcast.

=== Drumforge ===
Drumforge is a music software company founded by Joel Wanasek, Joey Sturgis and Joe Wohlitz that provides drum sample libraries and audio plug-ins. The company has released libraries by Taylor Larson, Luke Holland, Daniel Bergstrand, Matt Greiner and others.

=== Riffhard ===
Riffhard is an online guitar school created by Monuments guitarist John Browne, in partnership with URM Academy, and co-owned by Eyal Levi and Joel Wanasek, mainly dedicated to rhythm guitar.

=== Other projects ===
Wanasek has also developed plug-ins in collaboration with Joey Sturgis Tones (JST), namely "Bus Glue Joel Wanasek", a series of bus compressors.

He has also participated in the Joey Sturgis Forums Podcast, along with Sturgis and Levi, which was said to "cover a range of music industry topics such as marketing, touring, mixing and producing"

== Production discography ==
=== Studio albums ===
==== 2010s ====
Album	Released	Artist	Credit	Label	Chart (Note: Top chart only, charting songs from album not indicated)
Phronesis	Oct 5, 2018	Monuments	mixing, mastering	Century Media	Heatseeker Albums - #6
Trinity	Oct 31, 2018	ChuggaBoom	mastering		
Arbors	May 5, 2017	Arctic Sleep	engineer, mixing, mastering	The Church Within	
Passage Of Gaia	Aug 21, 2014	Arctic Sleep	producer, recording, mixing, mastering	Dripfeed	
Samurai Sessions Vol.2	Nov 8, 2017	Miyavi	mixing, mastering	Virgin Media	Billboard Japan - #9
Samurai Sessions Vol.3 -Worlds Collide-	December 5, 2018	Miyavi	mixing	Virgin Media	Billboard Japan - #27
Catharsis	Jan 26, 2018	Machine Head	post-production	Nuclear Blast	US Billboard 200 - #65
Electrogram	Sep 23, 2014	Vinyl Theatre	producer, mixing, mastering	Fueled By Ramen	Heatseeker Albums - #35
PWNZ	Sep 23, 2014	CHALLENGER!	producer		
All Is Vanity	Jun 9, 2017	Christina Grimmie	mastering	UMG; Republic Records; Zxl Music	
March Of Rome	Feb 10, 2017	Bases Loaded	mastering		
Home Is What You Make It	Mar 10, 2017	Bases Loaded	mastering		
Are You Out There?	Jun 23, 2017	Rilian	mixing, mastering	Kenobi	
Blood Money Part 1	Oct 28, 2016	Dope	mastering	Steamhammer	Billboard 200 - #27
To Those Left Behind	Sep 18, 2015	Blessthefall	mixing assistant	Fearless	Billboard 200 - #23
Future Golden Age	Dec 8, 2015	Fallstar	mastering	Rat Family	
An Achor To The Abyss: Chapter One	Dec 4, 2015	A Hero Within	mastering		
Navarasam (An Ennead)	2015	Thaikkudam Bridge	mastering	Satyam Audios	
Viceversa	Feb 4, 2014	Unarmed For Victory	mixing, mastering	Red Cord	
Movement	Oct 9, 2012	Inhale Exhale	mastering	Red Cord	
Change the World	Jun 12, 2012	From The Eyes Of Servants	mixing, mastering	Red Cord	
The Fire Inside	Oct 8, 2013	Righteous Vendetta	composer		
The Vitality Theory	Jun 15, 2010	Rosaline	producer, engineer, programming, orchestration	Good Fight	
Broken Mirrors	Oct 24, 2011	Mercy Screams	mixing, mastering	Good Fight	
This Is Our Rise	Aug 21, 2015	First Decree	producer, mixing, mastering		
We Are One	Dec 2, 2015	The Bloodline	producer, mixing, mastering, vocal engineer	Another Century	
Passage	Sep 30, 2011	The Chosen	mixing	Red Cord	
Making the Man	2010	Stranger Than Fate	mixing, mastering	Red Cord	
Inheritors	Aug 23, 2011	Serianna	engineer, producer	Bullet Tooth	
Hope for Now	Jul 22, 2014	Silent Screams	mixing assistant	Artery	
Exotype	Oct 3, 2014	Exotype	mixing	Rise	Heatseeker Albums - #27
Departure	May 14, 2013	Ocellus	producer, mixing, mastering		
California Cauliflower	Jun 18, 2014	Ian and the Dream	mastering		
Bad Dreams and Melodies	Oct 9, 2012	Southbound Fearing	strings, synthesizer, programming	Red Cord	
Babylon	May 14, 2010	Milosny	engineer, mastering	Red Cord	
30 Minutes or Less	Dec 12, 2010	Action Madison!	producer, mixing, mastering	Red Cord	
Killers & Thieves	Feb 25, 2014	Embers in Ashes	producer		

==== 2000s ====
Album	Released	Artist	Credit	Label	Chart
Stories From The Book Of Metal	May 21, 2008	Zephaniah	producer		
Gaining Ground	Oct 16, 2006	Dark Shift	mixing	Dark Shift, LLC	
The Deepest Rise	Jun 24, 2008	Dichotic	mixing, mastering	Psycho Drive Studios	
Kiss Of The Thorn	Sep 28, 2007	A Tortured Soul	recording, mixing, mastering	Eyes Like Snow	
Living The Dream	Sep 28, 2007	Rictus Grin	recording		

== Works ==
- "The Ultimate Guide to Becoming a Guitar Virtuoso" - 2005
