= His Last Walk =

Studio album by Blessthefall
- Released: November 7, 2006
- Recorded: 2006
- Studio: Blue Light Audio (Phoenix, Arizona)
- Genres: Metalcore, post-hardcore, emo
- Length: 46:03
- Label: Science
- Producers: Cory Spotts, Blessthefall

Blessthefall chronology
Blessthefall (2006)	His Last Walk (2006)	Witness (2009)

Singles from His Last Walk
- 1. "Higinia" Released: 2006; 2. "Guys Like You Make Us Look Bad" Released: 2007; 3. "A Message to the Unknown" Released: 2007; 4. "Rise Up" Released: 2007; 5. "I Wouldn't Quit If Everyone Quit" Released: March 4, 2008

His Last Walk is the debut studio album by the American metalcore band Blessthefall. The album was released on November 7, 2006. It is the only studio album by the band to feature original vocalist Craig Mabbitt, who would later be replaced by Beau Bokan. The album was released before Blessthefall started to play on the Taste of Chaos tour. The last song, "His Last Walk", features a hidden track called "Purple Dog", which is a joke song made by the band members in which all members sing the song and clap their hands.

The album was re-released through Ferret Music, featuring an acoustic version of "Rise Up" and "I Wouldn't Quit If Everyone Quit" as bonus tracks, the latter of which was previously released as a stand-alone single.

== Music and lyrics ==
The album's genre is post-hardcore. There are clean guitar tones in the intros and choruses of many songs. The album explores themes such as religious faith, emotional abandonment, and love.

Professional ratings
Review scores
Source	Rating
AbsolutePunk	(81%)
Blistering	Positive
Dead Press	8/10 stars
Jesus Freak Hideout	3.5/5 stars

== Track listing ==
All tracks are written by blessthefall, except where noted.

No.	Title	Writer(s)	Length
1.	"A Message to the Unknown"		3:32
2.	"Guys Like You Make Us Look Bad"		3:55
3.	"Higinia"		2:46
4.	"Could Tell a Love" (featuring Joe Cotela)	Joe Cotela, blessthefall	2:51
5.	"Rise Up"		3:42
6.	"Times Like These"		4:07
7.	"Pray"		4:18
8.	"With Eyes Wide Shut"		2:53
9.	"Wait for Tomorrow"		3:25
10.	"Black Rose Dying"		4:03
11.	"His Last Walk" (ends at 2:51. "Purple Dog", begins at 6:51)		10:31
Total length:			46:03

Reissue bonus tracks
No.	Title	Length
12.	"Rise Up" (acoustic)	4:09
13.	"I Wouldn't Quit If Everyone Quit"	3:10
Total length:		53:22

Enhanced CD
No.	Title	Length
1.	"Bonus Tour Footage"	15:28
2.	"Live Footage"	4:11
3.	"Higinia" (Music Video)	2:40
4.	"Higinia" (Spoof Video)	2:46

== Personnel ==
Blessthefall

- Craig Mabbitt – lead vocals
- Eric Lambert – lead guitar
- Mike Frisby – rhythm guitar
- Jared Warth – bass, vocals
- Matt Traynor – drums, percussion

Additional musicians

- Joe Cotela – additional vocals on track 4

Production

- Cory Spotts – producer, engineer, mixing
- Blessthefall – producer
- Marty Welker – drum technician
- Brian Trummel – artwork
- Tim Harmon – photography

== Charts ==
Chart (2007)	Peak position
US Heatseekers Albums (Billboard)	32
