= Backdraft (disambiguation) =

Backdraft is a phenomenon in a fire (see also Flashover).

Backdraft may also refer to:

- Backdraft (film), a 1991 American drama thriller film directed by Ron Howard
- Backdraft 2, the 2019 sequel
- Backdraft (attraction), a show in various Universal Studios Theme Parks
- Backdraft (album), a 2013 album by Fallstar
