= Phronesis (album) =

Studio album by Monuments
- Released: 5 October 2018
- Recorded: March – July 2018
- Genre: Progressive metal; djent
- Length: 39:50
- Label: Century Media
- Producer: John Browne; Olly Steele

Monuments chronology
The Amanuensis (2014)	Phronesis (2018)	In Stasis (2022)

Singles from Phronesis
- 1. "A.W.O.L" Released: 3 August 2018; 2. "Leviathan" Released: 31 August 2018; 3. "Mirror Image" Released: 21 September 2018

Phronesis is the third studio album by British progressive metal band Monuments. It was released through Century Media Records on 5 October 2018. Phronesis is derived from the ancient Greek word for "wisdom". It is the band's last release with vocalist Chris Barretto, drummer Daniel Lang and guitarist Olly Steele.

== Background ==
The album was recorded at different stages in studios in different countries. Guitars and bass were recorded by Jim Pinder at Treehouse Studios in Derbyshire; the drums were performed, recorded and engineered by Anup Sastry; and Chris Barretto recorded his vocals with Cristian Machado at Soundwars Studios in New Jersey. Then mixing and mastering was completed by Joel Wanasek at JTW Music in Milwaukee.

The album has been well received by critics including Already Heard, Dead Press!, Distorted Sound, and Metal Injection.

Upon the release of the album the band commenced on a 31-date tour of the United Kingdom and mainland Europe over October and November with main support from Vola. In January 2019 Monuments will be performing headline shows in New Zealand, then on the Australian multi-date music festival Progfest.

== Track listing ==
No.	Title	Length
1.	"A.W.O.L."	4:03
2.	"Hollow King"	2:54
3.	"Vanta"	3:56
4.	"Mirror Image"	4:57
5.	"Ivory"	3:37
6.	"Stygian Blue"	3:03
7.	"Leviathan"	4:35
8.	"Celeste"	3:39
9.	"Jukai"	4:53
10.	"The Watch"	4:16
Total length:		39:50

== Personnel ==
Monuments

- Chris Barretto – vocals
- John Browne – guitar, production, engineering, editing, booklet design
- Olly Steele – guitar, production
- Adam Swan – bass
- Daniel Lang – drums

Additional musicians

- Anup Sastry – drums, engineering, tracking

Additional personnel

- Jim Pinder – bass engineering, guitar engineering
- Cristian Machado – vocal engineering
- Joel Wanasek – mixing, mastering
- Joe Wohlitz – mixing assistant
- Paul Ortiz – orchestration, sound design
- Will Cross – artwork
- Fall McKenzie – logo
- Frank Wesp – band photo

== Charts ==
Chart (2018)	Peak position
German Albums (Offizielle Top 100)	70
