= In Stasis =

Studio album by Monuments
- Released: 15 April 2022
- Genres: Progressive metal; djent
- Length: 50:10
- Label: Century Media
- Producer: Mick Gordon

Monuments chronology
Phronesis (2018)	In Stasis (2022)

Singles from In Stasis
- 1. "Lavos" Released: 30 September 2021; 2. "Cardinal Red" Released: 4 February 2022; 3. "False Providence" Released: 16 March 2022

In Stasis is the fourth studio album by British progressive metal band Monuments. It was released on 15 April 2022 through Century Media Records and was produced by Mick Gordon. It is the band's first release with vocalist Andy Cizek and the last with longtime bassist Adam Swan, and drummer Mike Malyan.

== Critical reception ==
Professional ratings
Review scores
Source	Rating
Blabbermouth.net	9/10
Distorted Sound	9/10
Metal Injection	8/10
Metal Storm	8/10
New Noise	4.5/5 stars
Wall of Sound	8/10

The album received positive reviews from critics. Taylor Markarian from Blabbermouth.net gave the album 9 out of 10 and said: "Overall, In Stasis is an album that can grab a wider swath of fans than the average prog metal release. Lovers of metal, metalcore and even deathcore can all find something to like about it. While some songs stand out more than others, the record's huge sound leaves a forceful and lasting impression." Laura McCarthy of Distorted Sound scored the album 9 out of 10 and said: "There are so many moments that feel like Monuments are really allowed to breathe on this record; that everything flows in one movement, rather than ever feeling like a colossal instrumental with a song somewhere in it. While Monuments have proven themselves as top of their class in progressive metal for years, In Stasis feels like a brand new chapter wherein both the old and the new can coincide within their ranks to great a band greater than the sum of its parts." Metal Injection rated the album 8 out of 10 and stated, "As In Stasis demonstrates, progressive metalcore simply doesn't get much better than Monuments. Admittedly, added diversity amongst a few of the tracks would absolutely help them feel extra distinctive and adventurous. However, that's a small complaint when the material is so satisfying and expertly performed. For sure, the group has arguably its best line-up to date here, and the addition of a few guest musicians is exciting, too. Definitely don't let this one pass you by."

New Noise gave the album 4.5 out of 5 and stated: "Ultimately, Monuments feel rejuvenated and sound better than ever. I know djent and progressive metalcore will always have detractors, but it's almost undeniable that whatever form of 'stasis' the band are in right now, it's their strongest form yet." Wall of Sound gave the album a score 8/10 and said: "Initially, I didn't think I was going to have much to say because I was like, 'This is all just really good; how can I say "really good" ten times over?'. Am I completely obsessed with this album? Not entirely, but that doesn't mean it's not amazing. Like I said – it's not my natural lean towards, but this has taught me I need to reach out to prog WAY more. Whether you're usually into prog or not – give this album a listen; I doubt you'll regret it. Hopefully, my brain will allow this album to stay in my regular listening rotation (ADHD pals will understand)."

== Track listing ==
Adapted from Apple Music.

In Stasis track listing
No.	Title	Length
1.	"No One Will Teach You" (featuring Neema Askari)	4:59
2.	"Lavos"	4:10
3.	"Cardinal Red" (featuring Mick Gordon)	4:41
4.	"Opiate"	4:17
5.	"Collapse"	4:42
6.	"Arch Essence" (featuring Spencer Sotelo of Periphery)	5:28
7.	"Somnus"	4:09
8.	"False Providence" (featuring Mick Gordon)	5:01
9.	"Makeshift Harmony"	4:30
10.	"The Cimmerian"	8:10
Total length:		50:10

== Personnel ==
Credits adapted from Discogs.

Monuments

- Andy Cizek – vocals
- John Browne – guitar
- Adam Swan – bass
- Mike Malyan – drums, samples

Additional musicians

- Mick Gordon – guest instrumentation (3, 8), production
- Neema Askari – guest vocals (1)
- Spencer Sotelo of Periphery – guest vocals (6)

Additional personnel

- George Lever – mixing
- Jens Bogren – mastering
