= Gallows (Blessthefall album) =

Studio album by Blessthefall
- Released: September 5, 2025
- Recorded: 2023–2024
- Genres: Metalcore; post-hardcore; screamo
- Length: 34:12
- Label: Rise
- Producer: Hiram Hernandez

Blessthefall chronology
Hard Feelings (2018)	Gallows (2025)

Singles from Gallows
- 1. "Wake the Dead" Released: May 24, 2023; 2. "Drag Me Under" Released: August 29, 2024; 3. "Mallxcore" Released: June 13, 2025; 4. "Fell So Hard, Felt So Right" Released: August 1, 2025

Professional ratings
Review scores
Source	Rating
Blabbermouth.net	8/10
Kerrang!	3/5

Gallows is the seventh studio album by the American metalcore band Blessthefall. The album was released on September 5, 2025, through Rise Records. It is their first album without longtime drummer Matt Traynor and the first to be released after the band's split from 2020 to 2023.

== Background and promotion ==
Blessthefall started writing songs for a new album as early as 2021, during their hiatus. In 2023 and 2024, the ensemble published a music video for "Wake the Dead" and "Drag Me Under", respectively. With the single and video release of "Mallxcore" in June 2025, the band announced their first album in seven years, Gallows, to be released on September 5.

== Track listing ==
All tracks are written by Eric Lambert, Beau Bokan, Jared Warth, Elliott Gruenberg, and Hiram Hernandez, with additional writers noted.

Gallows track listing
No.	Title	Writer(s)	Length
1.	"Mallxcore"		3:09
2.	"Wake the Dead"	Tyler Smyth	3:07
3.	"Venom"	Smyth	4:27
4.	"Somebody Else" (featuring Matt Flood of Caskets)	Smyth; Matt Flood	3:01
5.	"Drag Me Under" (featuring Lochie Keogh of Alpha Wolf)	Anthony Cappocchi	3:30
6.	"Gallows"		3:27
7.	"Light the Flame"		3:28
8.	"Fell So Hard, Felt So Right" (featuring Dan Marsala of Story of the Year)		3:02
9.	"Y.S.A.B."		2:53
10.	"This Ends With Us"		4:08
Total length:			34:12

== Personnel ==
Credits adapted from the album's liner notes and Tidal.

=== Blessthefall ===
- Eric Lambert – guitar
- Beau Bokan – clean vocals, keyboards
- Jared Warth – unclean vocals, bass
- Elliott Gruenberg – guitar

=== Additional contributors ===
- Hiram Hernandez – production (all tracks); mixing (tracks 1, 3, 5–7, 9, 10); drums
- Tyler Smyth – vocal production (2–4); mixing (2)
- Matt Good – mixing (4, 8)
- Mike Kalajian – mastering
- Matt Flood – guest vocals (4)
- Lochie Keogh – guest vocals (5)
- Dan Marsala – guest vocals (8)
- Kevin Moore – art direction, design
