= Witness (Blessthefall album) =

Studio album by Blessthefall
- Released: October 6, 2009
- Genres: Metalcore; post-hardcore; screamo
- Length: 41:00
- Label: Fearless
- Producer: Michael "Elvis" Baskette

Blessthefall chronology
His Last Walk (2007)	Witness (2009)	Awakening (2011)

Singles from Witness
- 1. "To Hell & Back" Released: July 27, 2009; 2. "God Wears Gucci" Released: August 10, 2009; 3. "What's Left of Me" Released: September 9, 2009; 4. "Hey Baby, Here's That Song You Wanted" Released: November 5, 2010

Witness is the second studio album by the American metalcore band Blessthefall. It was released on October 6, 2009, through Fearless Records. It is the band's first album with Beau Bokan on lead vocals and final album with original guitarist Mike Frisby. The song "God Wears Gucci" was released in MySpace and the iTunes Store on Tuesday, August 10, 2009, and is the third song released off the album, along with "To Hell & Back" and "We'll Sleep When We're Dead", although these were demonstrations to the album versions. On September 9 the band uploaded a new track to Myspace: "What's Left of Me". The entire album was streaming on their MySpace page until October 6, 2009. The album was released for sale in the US on October 6, 2009, with a European release date of the October 26 scheduled, ahead of their first ever European headline tour in support of the album. Witness sold 11,000 copies in its first week, debuting at No. 56 on Billboard 200 and No. 6 on the Top Independent Albums chart.

== Impact ==
Revolver regarded the album as an essential 2009 metalcore album: "Blessthefall didn’t redefine the genre on this album, but they tightened its bolts and rounded its edges in a way that felt distinctly modern at the time."

Professional ratings
Review scores
Source	Rating
AllMusic	3/5 stars
Alter the Press!	4/5 stars

== Track listing ==
No.	Title	Length
1.	"2.0"	1:00
2.	"What's Left of Me"	3:30
3.	"To Hell & Back"	3:18
4.	"God Wears Gucci"	4:07
5.	"Hey Baby, Here's That Song You Wanted"	3:14
6.	"Witness"	3:13
7.	"Last Ones Left"	2:51
8.	"Five Ninety"	3:50
9.	"We'll Sleep When We're Dead"	4:11
10.	"Skinwalkers"	3:58
11.	"You Deserve Nothing & I Hope You Get Less"	3:36
12.	"Stay Still"	4:10
Total length:		41:06

== Personnel ==
Blessthefall

- Beau Bokan – clean vocals, keyboards
- Eric Lambert – lead guitar, vocals
- Mike Frisby – rhythm guitar
- Jared Warth – unclean vocals, bass
- Matt Traynor – drums, percussion

Production

- Michael "Elvis" Baskette – mixing, production
- Dave Holdredge – engineer, mixing
- Jef Moll – digital editing

== Charts ==
Chart performance
Chart (2009)	Peak position
US Billboard 200	56
US Independent Albums (Billboard)	6
US Top Alternative Albums (Billboard)	13
US Top Hard Rock Albums (Billboard)	9
US Top Rock Albums (Billboard)	25
