= Killers & Thieves =

Studio album by Embers in Ashes
- Released: February 25, 2014
- Genre: Progressive rock, Christian rock
- Length: 33:23
- Label: Independent
- Producer: Chris Galves, Joel Wanasek

Killers & Thieves is the second studio album from Embers in Ashes. They released the album independently on February 25, 2014. Embers in Ashes worked in the studio with, Chris Galves and Joel Wanasek.

== Critical reception ==
Professional ratings
Review scores
Source	Rating
CCM Magazine	3/5 stars
Christian Music Review	3.7/5
CM Addict	4/5 stars
HM Magazine	3/5 stars
Jesus Wired	7/10 stars
New Release Tuesday	4/5 stars

Rating the album three stars for CCM Magazine, Bert Saraco writes, "The processed vocals frequently lack a visceral kick; but the band sounds earnest, talented and maybe a vocalist away from becoming a major Christian rock contender." Anthony Bryant, giving the album three stars at HM Magazine, states, "Bright guitars, and crisp drums flow through the speakers as if you just took a bite of a juicy apple — not too bitter and not too sweet", however, "The weakest part of Killers and Thieves would be the vocals." Awarding the album four stars from New Release Tuesday, Jonathan J. Francesco describes, "Embers in Ashes have created a meaningful and passionate rock record that successfully executes a thoughtful blend of headbanging riffs, singable melodies, passionate vocals, and meaningful lyrics into a cohesive package."

Daniel Edgeman, rating the album a 3.7 out of five for Christian Music Review, states, "Killers & Thieves is a rock album with a purpose and message." Awarding the album four stars at CM Addict, Kelcey Wixtrom writes, "Driving guitars and pleading melodies blend seamlessly with the intense drum rhythms and strong vocals of this album." Chris Adam, giving the album seven out of ten stars from Jesus Wired, describes, "Embers In Ashes have created a very decent album, but one that will probably not be on many top ten lists by the end of the year." In a review by William Corbin at Jesus Freak Hideout, he says, "Embers in Ashes has good musical skill and great sounds for rock fans who like a mix of metal and pop in their music. However, the lyrics will need to become much more creative before they make it to the big stage."

== Track listing ==
No.	Title	Length
1.	"Set Fire"	3:37
2.	"Into My Arms"	3:10
3.	"Guide Me Home"	3:19
4.	"The Mirror"	3:14
5.	"Night from Day"	3:21
6.	"Killers & Thieves"	3:25
7.	"2000 Miles"	2:55
8.	"Stones"	3:01
9.	"Right in Front of Me"	3:45
10.	"What Matters"	3:36
Total length:		33:23
