= Gnosis (Monuments album) =

Studio album by Monuments
- Released: 28 August 2012
- Genre: Progressive metal; djent
- Length: 41:09
- Label: Century Media
- Producer: John Browne

Monuments chronology
We Are the Foundation (2010)	Gnosis (2012)	The Amanuensis (2014)

Alternative cover
- Vinyl Reissue Artwork

Singles from Gnosis
- 1. "Doxa" Released: 28 June 2012; 2. "Degenerate" Released: 9 August 2012

Gnosis is the debut studio album by British progressive metal band Monuments. It was released on 27 August 2012 through Century Media Records. The album was produced by founding member and guitarist John Browne.

Music videos for the songs "97% Static" and "Regenerate" were released in support of the album.

A vinyl pressing of the album was released on 16 October 2015, including a bonus CD of the album's instrumentals. It is the band's only album with vocalist Matt Rose.

== Background ==
All of the material on Gnosis was composed by guitarist John Browne long before the album's release. Original vocalists Neema Askari and Greg Pope wrote lyrics for the songs, many of which were performed live during the band's early tours. Due to disagreements, the two vocalists left the band in 2011, leaving the band unable to use the lyrics written previously. In 2012, Matt Rose was recruited into the group to fill the vacancy. Though Rose re-wrote all of the album's lyrics, an issue arose when Monuments intended to release the song "Memoirs" featuring a memorable chorus whose lyrics and melody were written by Neema Askari and Joe Garrett. Askari refused to allow the use of the chorus, resulting in the song being removed from the album's track list not long before the release date. Following the album's release, "Memoirs" was released as a digital single, with all profits going to a charity of Askari and Garrett's choosing.

== Track listing ==
No.	Title	Writer(s)	Length
1.	"Admit Defeat"	John Browne, Mike Malyan, Matt Rose	4:13
2.	"Degenerate"	Browne, Rose	4:12
3.	"Doxa"	Browne, Rose	4:31
4.	"The Uncollective"	Browne, Rose, Oliver Steele	3:58
5.	"Blue Sky Thinking"	Browne, Rose	5:12
6.	"97% Static"	Browne, Rose	4:33
7.	"Empty Vessels Make the Most Noise"	Browne, Rose	3:46
8.	"Regenerate"	Browne, Rose, Adam Freeman Swan	5:33
9.	"Denial" (featuring Spencer Sotelo of Periphery)	Browne, Malyan, Rose	5:11
Total length:			41:09

Limited Edition Bonus Tracks
No.	Title	Writer(s)	Length
10.	"Doxa" (instrumental)	Browne	4:32
11.	"Denial" (instrumental)	Browne, Malyan	5:15
Total length:			50:56

iTunes Exclusive Track
No.	Title	Writer(s)	Length
10.	"Empty Vessels Make the Most Noise" (Paradigm Shift remix)	Browne	4:06
Total length:			45:15

Vinyl Release Bonus Disc: "The Instrumentals"
No.	Title	Writer(s)	Length
1.	"Admit Defeat" (instrumental)	Browne, Malyan	4:14
2.	"Degenerate" (instrumental)	Browne	4:13
3.	"Doxa" (instrumental)	Browne	4:31
4.	"The Uncollective" (instrumental)	Browne, Steele	3:57
5.	"Blue Sky Thinking" (instrumental)	Browne	5:19
6.	"Memoirs" (instrumental)	Browne	3:58
7.	"97% Static" (instrumental)	Browne	4:48
8.	"Empty Vessels Make the Most Noise" (instrumental)	Browne	3:53
9.	"Regenerate" (instrumental)	Browne, Swan	6:22
10.	"Denial" (instrumental)	Browne, Malyan	5:08
Total length:			46:24

== Personnel ==
Monuments

- Matt Rose – vocals
- John Browne – guitar, production, mixing, engineering, concept
- Olly Steele – guitar
- Adam Swan – bass
- Mike Malyan – drums

Additional musicians

- Spencer Sotelo of Periphery – guest vocals on track 9

Additional personnel

- Dan Weller – vocal production
- Mazen Murad – mastering
- John Giulio Sprich – management
- Marco Walzel – booking
- Fall McKenzie – artwork, illustrations, logo
