= Take the Crown (band) =

American post-hardcore band (2004–2008)

- Origin: Huntington Beach, California, U.S.
- Genres: Post-hardcore, electronic rock
- Years active: 2004–2008
- Label: Rise
- Past members: Beau Bokan; Nick Coffey; Ryan Wilson; Aaron Elliott; Ken Floyd; James Campbell; Tony Gonzalez; Juan Pereda; Trevor Bodewitz
- Website: takethecrown.net

Take the Crown was an American post-hardcore band from Huntington Beach, California. The original lineup included vocalist Beau Bokan, guitarist Nick Coffey, guitarist Tony Gonzalez, bassist James Campbell, and keyboardist Ryan Wilson. The band began recording demos in 2004 with friend Chris Sorenson of Saosin; he would later produce their self-released debut EP, Let the Games Begin, in 2006. The band signed to Rise in 2007 and released their follow up full-length album, Relapse React, in May 2008. They announced their disbandment on September 25, 2008, which was due to the departure of James Campbell and Tony Gonzalez, lack of management, and financial burdens. After their disbandment, lead vocalist Beau Bokan went on to become the lead vocalist of Blessthefall, replacing Craig Mabbitt who would later go on to front Escape the Fate.

== History ==
=== Beginnings (2004–2006) ===
Beau Bokan formed Take the Crown in early 2004 with Tony Gonzalez. The original lineup was constantly changing and was more reminiscent of pop punk acts of the likes of Blink 182 or Pennywise than any of the bands recorded works. The early lineup, including the likes of Martine Stewart (Donnybrook, Terror), changed constantly as did the band's sound. During the early stages of Take the Crown, the band occasionally performed in the Los Angeles area at venues such as Skateland and The Knitting Factory. Take the Crown eventually added Nick Coffey, Ryan Wilson, James Campbell, and Aaron Birdsall to the permanent lineup and began to move in a more Post-Hardcore direction. Take the Crown quickly gained local notoriety in the Southern California music scene, playing with such acts as The Aquabats, Eighteen Visions, and performing to packed crowds at their home venue Chain Reaction.

=== Let the Games Begin (2007–2008) ===
Their debut release, Let the Games Begin, produced by Chris Sorenson of the band Saosin, was released in 2006. The band replaced drummer Aaron Birdsall with Trevor Bodewitz and began touring in support of the album. Shortly after the departure of Birdsall, the band was selected to perform with AFI during their Five Flowers shows and at the Los Angeles date of the Taste of Chaos tour. The band did two UK tours, in support of Eighteen Visions and The Blackout, as well as a US tours with Lostprophets and Four Year Strong. Drummer Juan Pereda (formerly of Taken and Name Taken) replaced Trevor Bodewitz for the final tour in support of the record, however, he was soon replaced by Aaron Elliott.

=== Relapse React (2008) ===
After a receiving a positive response to the self-released Let the Games Begin, the band signed with Rise Records in October 2007. Take the Crown entered the studio with Kris Crummett to record their follow up release Relapse React. Tony Gonzalez left Take the Crown shortly after recording Relapse React due to personal issues and was replaced by Ken Floyd (formerly of Eighteen Visions). The album was well received by critics, however, the band broke up months after the album's release citing the departure of James Campbell and Tony Gonzalez, lack of management, and financial burdens. Take the Crown's final tour was in support of Emarosa in 2008.

== Band members ==
Final lineup

- Beau Bokan – lead vocals (2004–2008)
- Nick Coffey – lead guitar, backing vocals, unclean vocals (2004–2008)
- Ryan Wilson – keyboards, synthesizers, backing vocals (2004–2008)
- Aaron Elliott – drums, percussion (2007–2008)

Former

- Ken Floyd – rhythm guitar, backing vocals (2008)
- James Campbell – bass guitar, backing vocals, keyboards (2004–2008)
- Tony Gonzalez – rhythm guitar (2004–2008)
- Juan Pereda – drums, percussion (2007)

== Discography ==
Albums

Year	Album Details
2006	Take the Crown: Released: 2006; Label: Self-released
2006	Let the Games Begin: Released: 2006; Label: Self-released
2008	Relapse React: Released: May 13, 2008; Label: Rise
