= Awakening (Blessthefall album) =

Studio album by Blessthefall
- Released: October 4, 2011
- Genres: Metalcore; post-hardcore
- Length: 49:27
- Label: Fearless
- Producer: Michael "Elvis" Baskette

Blessthefall chronology
Witness (2009)	Awakening (2011)	Hollow Bodies (2013)

Singles from Awakening
- 1. "Bottomfeeder" Released: August 4, 2011; 2. "Promised Ones" Released: August 16, 2011; 3. "40 Days..." Released: September 12, 2011

Awakening is the third studio album by the American metalcore band Blessthefall. It was released on October 4, 2011, through Fearless Records. It is the band's second album with singer Beau Bokan and first album with rhythm guitarist Elliott Gruenberg after the departure of Mike Frisby. The album was produced by Michael "Elvis" Baskette, producer of the second album, Witness. On September 12, the song "40 Days..." was released on the IGN site. It debuted at No. 32 on the Billboard 200, selling over 11,290 copies in its first week. In Canada, the album debuted at No. 88 on the Canadian Albums Chart.

== Music ==
The album's style is similar to previous releases by the band. Like Witness, the album features a few songs without harsh screaming or death growls.

== Critical reception ==
Professional ratings
Review scores
Source	Rating
Absolute Punk	60%
Allmusic	3.5/5 stars
Alternative Press	3.5/5 stars
IGN	7.5/10 stars
Revolver	3/5 stars
Sputnikmusic	3.5/5 stars

Revolver magazine briefly reviewed the album, though pointing out the "same-sounding guitar and drum patterns and dynamic shifts that showcase the group’s tight, precision playing but scream for variety."

== Track listing ==
No.	Title	Length
1.	"Awakening"	1:19
2.	"Promised Ones"	3:36
3.	"Bottomfeeder"	3:35
4.	"I'm Bad News, in the Best Way"	3:50
5.	"The Reign"	4:00
6.	"40 Days..."	4:18
7.	"Bones Crew"	3:16
8.	"Don't Say Goodbye"	3:46
9.	"Undefeated"	3:25
10.	"'Till the Death of Me"	4:25
11.	"Flatline (Interlude)"	1:42
12.	"Meet Me at the Gates"	12:15
Total length:		49:27

iTunes Bonus Track
No.	Title	Length
13.	"Promised Ones (Big Chocolate Remix)"	3:34
Total length:		48:07

"Meet Me at the Gates" ends at 7:15. In the original version, it is followed by silence and a hidden track titled "I Love You Lord" starting at 10:33. Those are not included in the iTunes version.

== Personnel ==
Blessthefall

- Beau Bokan – lead vocals, keyboards
- Eric Lambert – guitar
- Elliott Gruenberg – guitar
- Jared Warth – unclean vocals, bass
- Matt Traynor – drums

Production

- Michael "Elvis" Baskette – production
- Chris Dudley (of Underoath) – programming
- Jeff Gross – artwork

== Charts ==
Year	Album details	Peak chart positions						
Year	Album details	US	US Alt	US Heat	US Hard Rock	US Indie	US Rock	AUS
2011	Awakening: Released: October 4, 2011; Label: Fearless; Format: CD, digital download	32	11	—	3	7	13	—
"—" denotes a release that did not chart
