= To Those Left Behind =

Album by Blessthefall

Studio album by Blessthefall
- Released: September 18, 2015
- Genre: Metalcore; post-hardcore; screamo
- Length: 42:02
- Label: Fearless
- Producer: Joey Sturgis

Blessthefall chronology
Hollow Bodies (2013)	To Those Left Behind (2015)	Hard Feelings (2018)

Singles from To Those Left Behind
- 1. "Up in Flames" Released: July 9, 2015; 2. "Walk on Water" Released: August 9, 2015

To Those Left Behind is the fifth studio album by the American metalcore band Blessthefall. The album was released on September 18, 2015, through Fearless Records and was produced by Joey Sturgis. It is their last album to be released on this label before the band signed to Rise Records in 2018. The first single, "Up in Flames" was released on July 9, 2015, while the band was on Vans Warped Tour 2015.

== Background ==
The band announced in April that they had entered the studio to work with Joey Sturgis for their fifth album. In June, while on Warped Tour 2015, they gave a September 18 release date through Fearless Records. Of the album, frontman Beau Bokan said, "As a band we are constantly trying to outdo ourselves and take a step forward with each record. With this new album we've taken a giant fucking leap forward and are at our absolute best as musicians and song writers. We're looking forward to seeing where this album will take us." It was announced that if you buy the album from the Merchnow site you will receive a bonus track of the acoustic version of "Condition // Comatose" along with the album.

== Critical reception ==
Professional ratings
Review scores
Source	Rating
Alternative Press	4/5 stars
HM Magazine	3.5/5 stars
Outburn	8/10

The album has been met with positive reviews. Critics gave praise for the album's technical aspects, but noted how the album was predictable and nothing new. In a review for Alternative Press Tyler Davidson writes, "...blessthefall know exactly how to double down on each of those elements, crystallizing the dichotomy in a way that simultaneously serves the genre while still feeling new enough to make a lasting impression." In a more mixed review, Taylor Weston for HM Magazine wrote, "Kudos to them for making sure this latest release didn't enter into the rut of metalcore. It's not a life-changing release, but it's a steady progression of bettering their work that has them around more than a decade after they started." A more favorable review from Outburn, Nathaniel Lay stated, "This is a prime example of metalcore".

The album was included at number 39 on Rock Sound's top 50 releases of 2015 list.

== Track listing ==
No.	Title	Length
1.	"Decayer"	4:07
2.	"Walk on Water"	3:54
3.	"Dead Air"	3:48
4.	"Up in Flames"	3:31
5.	"Against the Waves"	3:39
6.	"Looking Down from the Edge"	3:59
7.	"Keep What We Love & Burn the Rest"	2:51
8.	"Condition // Comatose"	3:45
9.	"Oathbreaker"	3:36
10.	"To Those Left Behind"	4:18
11.	"Departures"	4:30
Total length:		42:02

Merchnow & Japanese bonus track
No.	Title	Length
12.	"Condition // Comatose" (acoustic version)	3:44
Total length:		45:46

== Personnel ==
Blessthefall

- Beau Bokan – lead vocals, keyboards
- Jared Warth – unclean vocals, bass
- Eric Lambert – guitar, vocals
- Elliott Gruenberg – guitar
- Matt Traynor – drums

Production

- Joey Sturgis – producer, engineer, mastering, vocal editing, vocal engineer
- Nick Matzkows – editing, engineer, vocal editing, vocal engineer, background vocals
- Erik Ron – vocal editing, vocal engineer, vocal producer
- Joel Wanasek – mixing assistant
- Josh Parpowicz – assistant
- Anthony Reeder – engineer
- Florian Mihr – art direction, layout
- Karl Pfeiffer – photography

Additional musicians Background vocals –

- Josh Buckner
- Matt Chambers
- Chris Koo
- Alex Kuzmanovic
- Kristin Leanne
- Michael Martenson
- Jacob Matzkows
- Randy McClaughry
- Mark Peromm

== Charts ==
Year	Peak chart positions					
Year	US	US Alt	US Hard Rock	US Indie	US Rock	AUS
2015	23	5	3	5	8	98
