= Hollow Bodies =

Studio album by Blessthefall
- Released: August 20, 2013
- Studio: The Foundation Estate
- Genres: Metalcore; electronicore; post-hardcore
- Length: 46:15
- Label: Fearless
- Producer: Joey Sturgis

Blessthefall chronology
Awakening (2011)	Hollow Bodies (2013)	To Those Left Behind (2015)

Singles from Hollow Bodies
- 1. "You Wear a Crown But You're No King" Released: June 25, 2013; 2. "Déjà Vu" Released: July 30, 2013

Hollow Bodies is the fourth studio album by the American metalcore band Blessthefall. It was released on August 20, 2013, through Fearless Records and produced by Joey Sturgis. It is the third album to include lead singer Beau Bokan, second album to include rhythm guitarist, Elliott Gruenberg and the first to include the same members in consecutive albums.

The band announced the album on June 10, 2013, and published the album cover and track list. On June 25, the song "You Wear a Crown But You're No King" was released as the first single. A video of interviews with the band members in the studio was released on July 24 that also showed a preview of the second single "Déjà Vu" which was released on July 30. On August 13, the entire album was streamed through Billboard.com.

The album debuted at No. 15 on the Billboard 200 and reached No. 1 on the Hard Rock chart selling 21,888 copies in the first week, up over 10,000 from their previous release. The album has sold 58,000 copies in the US as of August 2015.

== Background and promotion ==
In 2011, the band released their third album Awakening to mostly positive reviews and began numerous tours to support the album. In late 2012, they revealed they had begun writing new music and were hoping to release their fourth studio album in mid to late 2013. It was announced on Twitter that Joey Sturgis would produce the album. The band entered the studio in April 2013 and confirmed the album was complete on May 21.

The band played at the Vans Warped Tour 2013 on the main stage for the first time and played the song "You Wear a Crown But You're No King" which was later released as a single on June 25, 2013. On July 24, a studio update video was released which discussed the writing recording process. The band stated in short interviews that the album will be different than anything they've ever done; that the album takes on a much heavier mood and sound.

The second single, "Déjà Vu", was streamed through altpress.com on July 29, 2013, and was officially released the following day.

It was announced that Vic Fuentes of Pierce the Veil was working on a song with the band. It was later revealed to be the track, "See You on the Outside" which was streamed through Hot Topic on August 8, 2013 and had an unreleased music video created for the single by Music Video Producer/Director, Bobby Czzowitz.

On August 13, the entire album was streamed through Billboard's website, allowing fans to listen to the album before the official release date.

== Composition ==
Phil Freeman of Alternative Press wrote that "this is digitally crunchy modern metalcore" that contains "clean vocals" that "soar over beds of synth while hoarse spittle-flecked roars are bolstered by hammering, downturned guitar riffs." At HM, Anthony Bryant told that this "is another example of the group’s expert harmony of symphonicism and vicious instrumentals". Andy Biddulph stated that blessthefall has "creat[ed] a perfect marriage of electronica and metalcore." On the subject of lyricism, Freeman wrote that it "is overwrought but not embarrassingly so—the end of the relationship is compared to the collapse of an empire, but somehow it works."

== Critical reception ==
Professional ratings
Review scores
Source	Rating
About.com	3.5/5 stars
Alternative Press	4/5 stars
HM	4/5 stars
Music Connection	7/10
Outburn	8/10
Rock Sound	9/10

Hollow Bodies has received positive reception by music critics. At Alternative Press, Phil Freeman called it "an ambitious, impressive album." Anthony Biddulph of Rock Sound affirmed that this album "isn't a simple step up, this is the album that will define their career." At HM, Anthony Bryant wrote that "this album is a blistering example of why many have come to love Blessthefall and shows that, despite its hiccups, this group is still the undisputed ruler of the post-hardcore scene." Nathaniel Lay of Outburn stated that the release "carries on their tradition of putting out exciting albums that are worthy of praise and recommendation." At About.com, Chad Bowar called the album a "step forward".

== Track listing ==
All tracks are written by Blessthefall, except "You Were a Crown but You're No King" (co-written with Mike Green and Simon Wilcox) and "See You on the Outside" (co-written with Vic Fuentes).

Hollow Bodies track listing
No.	Title	Length
1.	"Exodus"	5:28
2.	"You Wear a Crown But You're No King"	3:43
3.	"Hollow Bodies"	4:17
4.	"Déjà Vu"	4:17
5.	"Buried in These Walls"	3:46
6.	"See You on the Outside"	4:14
7.	"Youngbloods" (featuring Jesse Barnett)	2:56
8.	"Standing on the Ashes"	3:12
9.	"Carry On" (featuring Jake Luhrs)	3:15
10.	"The Sound of Starting Over"	4:08
11.	"Open Water" (featuring Lights)	6:59
Total length:		46:15

== Personnel ==
Credits adapted from the album's liner notes.

=== Blessthefall ===
- Beau Bokan – lead vocals, keyboards
- Jared Warth – unclean vocals, bass
- Eric Lambert – guitar, backing vocals
- Elliot Gruenberg – guitar
- Matt Traynor – drums

=== Additional contributors ===
- Joey Sturgis – production, engineering, mixing, mastering, guest vocal engineering on "Open Water", additional electronics, programming
- Chuck Alkazian – drum engineering
- Josh Karpowicz – drum engineering assistance
- Nick Scott – guitar engineering, bass engineering, vocal engineering, guitar edits, bass edits
- Kacey Dodson – vocal edits
- Jesse Barnett – guest vocals on "Youngbloods"
- Ben Knightbus – guest vocal engineering on "Youngbloods"
- Jake Luhrs – guest vocals on "Carry On"
- Carson Slovak – guest vocal engineering on "Carry On"
- Lights – guest vocals on "Open Water"
- Laurel Pistey – cello on "Open Water"
- Kenneth Trotter – violin on "Open Water"
- Brendan Williams – string engineering on "Open Water"
- Trevor Fedele – string engineering on "Open Water"
- Shireen Ravis – gang vocals
- Donovan Ravis – gang vocals
- Noris Hanna – gang vocals
- Teri Cwiek – gang vocals
- Dan Cox – gang vocals
- Cody Leppien – gang vocals
- Kory Jurek – gang vocals
- Matthew DeVries – gang vocals
- Brandon Englehart – gang vocals
- Danielle Tunstall – photography
- Mike Farrell – layout

== Charts ==
Chart (2013)	Peak position
US Billboard 200	15
US Independent Albums (Billboard)	3
US Top Alternative Albums (Billboard)	2
US Top Hard Rock Albums (Billboard)	1
US Top Rock Albums (Billboard)	4
