= Rosaline (band) =

American post-hardcore band

- Origin: Chicago, Illinois
- Genres: Post-hardcore
- Years active: 2005-2011
- Labels: Eulogy, Standby, Good Fight
- Past members: Cody Lumpkin; Madison Stolzer; Christopher Maxson; Ricky Bakosh; Ryan Pulice; Nathan Steinheimer; Joe Welch; Matt Hahn; Nick Jones; Ryan Prindle
- Website: myspace.com/rosaline

Rosaline (pronounced "Rah-za-lynn") was a six-piece post-hardcore band from Chicago, Illinois that formed in 2005.

The group modeled their sound from early 2000s post-hardcore groups, citing influences from Thursday, Underoath, Hopesfall, Taking Back Sunday and The Bled. Alternative Press described their sound as "a post-hardcore blend of unpolished, thrashing emotion." Over the span of their career Rosaline released three albums on various independent record labels.

== History ==
=== Inception and A Constant North ===
In an interview with Absolute Punk, keyboardist Nate Steinheimer commented that "Rosaline formed the way most bands do, a bunch of kids in high school who weren't any good at sports and who weren't that cool, so we just played music instead". Pulling inspiration from other groups involved in the early 2000s post-hardcore movement, Rosaline independently released their debut 8 track EP We're All Just Passing Through in 2005 with lead singer Joe Welch, who left the band shortly after to join the military. The band was inactive during most of 2006 and 2007 until guitarist Madison Stolzer returned after briefly joining the group Emarosa.

On April 27, 2009 Rosaline announced their signing to Eulogy Records during an on-air interview with Chicago's rock radio station Q101. The band released A Constant North for the label on July 21, 2009. Produced by Joey Sturgis and Joel Wanasek, guitarist Madison Stolzer described the album by saying: "A Constant North is always there, ya know? The album will always be there; those emotions are pretty much always going to live on" "A Constant North" was re-released in December 2009 in Japan through the major label Avex. The Japanese version included new artwork and re-mastered audio.

=== The Vitality Theory and disestablishment ===
In a video featured on the Alternative Press website in April 2010, Rosaline revealed that they had begun tracking for their debut full-length album The Vitality Theory. The album was released on July 20 under the label Good Fight Music and was well received by the musical community. Absolute Punk gave it a "93%" rating, calling it "an album of the year and sleeper album of the year contender". The song "Model Ships" was released as downloadable content for the video game Rock Band 2 and Rock Band 3 on December 5, 2010. Additionally, the song "It's Just Better For Everyone" was featured in a season 6 episode of the reality television series Bad Girls Club.

It was announced on July 1, 2011 through the Rosaline Facebook page that they were departing from the music industry. The reasons for the departure are unknown. One of the members later updated the page explaining; "We didn't break up, we went down together". They released one final song as a free download for their fans entitled "Edge of An Era".

Following their dissolution, several members went on to pursue different musical ventures. Bassist Ryan Pulice briefly joined fellow Illinois post-hardcore act The Color Morale. Keyboardist Nate Steinheimer launched the independent label Mutant League Records in partnership with Victory Records.

== Band members ==
Final Lineup

- Madison Stolzer - Guitar and Vocals (2005-2011)
- Christopher Maxson - Lead Guitar (2005-2009)
- Nick Jones - Lead Vocals (2005-2009)
- Ryan Prindle - Drums (2005-2009)
- Nathan Steinheimer - Keyboards and Vocals (2005-2011)
- Ryan Pulice - Bass (2005-2011)
- Cody Lumpkin - Lead Vocals (2009-2011)
- Ricky Bakosh - Guitar and Vocals (2009-2011)
- Matt Hahn - Drums (2009-2011)

== Discography ==
Studio albums

Year	Album	Label	Chart positions		
Year	Album	Label	US	US Indie	US Heat
2010	The Vitality Theory	Good Fight	—	—	96
2009	A Constant North	Eulogy	—	—	—
"—" denotes a release that did not chart.

EPs

- We're All Just Passing Through (2005, Independently Released)
