= Hard Feelings (album) =

Studio album by Blessthefall
- Released: March 23, 2018
- Genre: Metalcore; post-hardcore; alternative rock; screamo
- Length: 37:46
- Label: Rise
- Producer: Blessthefall; Tyler Smyth

Blessthefall chronology
To Those Left Behind (2015)	Hard Feelings (2018)	Gallows (2025)

Singles from Hard Feelings
- 1. "Melodramatic" Released: January 29, 2018; 2. "Wishful Sinking" Released: February 14, 2018; 3. "Cutthroat" Released: March 16, 2018

Hard Feelings is the sixth studio album by the American metalcore band Blessthefall. The album was released on March 23, 2018, through Rise Records. It was produced by Tyler Smyth and the band themselves. It is their first album to be released after the band signed to Rise Records in 2018. It is also the last album to feature the band's founding drummer Matt Traynor before he left the band in August 2018.

== Background and promotion ==
On January 26, 2018, they announced they have signed a new record deal with Rise Records. In the same month, the ensemble published a music video for "Melodramatic", with a video for "Wishful Sinking" broadcast the month following.

In early 2018, the group toured with Of Mice & Men, Cane Hill, MSCW and Fire from the Gods.

== Track listing ==
All music and lyrics written and performed by Blessthefall.

No.	Title	Length
1.	"Wishful Sinking"	4:27
2.	"Find Yourself"	3:57
3.	"Melodramatic"	3:01
4.	"Feeling Low"	3:34
5.	"Cutthroat"	3:18
6.	"I'm Over Being Under(rated)"	3:35
7.	"Sleepless in Phoenix"	3:45
8.	"Keep Me Close"	4:47
9.	"Sakura Blues"	3:41
10.	"Welcome Home"	3:41
Total length:		37:46

== Personnel ==
Credits adapted from the album's liner notes and Tidal.

=== Blessthefall ===
- Beau Bokan – vocals, keyboards, production
- Eric Lambert – guitar, production
- Elliott Gruenberg – guitar, production, additional programming
- Jared Warth – unclean vocals, bass, production
- Matt Traynor – drums, production

=== Additional contributors ===
- Tyler Smyth – production, engineering, mixing, mastering
- Michael Sebastian Romero – engineering assistance
- Cory Brunnemann – additional vocal processing
- Matt Good – additional production on "Wishful Sinking", "Find Yourself" and "Sakura Blues"
- Howard Benson – additional production on "Sleepless in Phoenix"
- Corey Meyers – art direction, layout, photography
- Andrew Strelecki – photography
- Lindsey Byrnes – band photo

== Charts ==
Chart (2018)	Peak position
New Zealand Heatseeker Albums (RMNZ)	8
US Billboard 200	54
US Top Alternative Albums (Billboard)	5
