= The Amanuensis =

Studio album by Monuments
- Released: 23 June 2014
- Studio: Monnow Valley Studio, Wales; Audiohammer Studios, Florida; Bear Noize Studio, England
- Genre: Progressive metal; djent
- Length: 50:21
- Label: Century Media
- Producer: John Browne

Monuments chronology
| Gnosis (2012) | The Amanuensis (2014) | Phronesis (2018) |

Singles from The Amanuensis
- 1. "I, the Creator" Released: 9 May 2014; 2. "Origin of Escape" Released: 2 June 2014; 3. "The Alchemist" Released: 9 June 2014; 4. "Atlas" Released: 16 June 2014

The Amanuensis is the second studio album by British progressive metal band Monuments. It was released on 23 June 2014 through Century Media Records. The album takes its title from the novel Cloud Atlas by David Mitchell, while according to guitarist John Browne, the album's lyrics refer to the Samsara Cycle: "The cyclical existence of life that we are all bound to. Chris has written an entire story around the lyrics. Maybe that will see the light one day! It's the story of Samsara." It is the band's first album with vocalist Chris Barretto.

== Critical reception ==
Professional ratings
Review scores
| Source | Rating |
|---|---|
| Sputnikmusic | 4/5 stars |
| Ultimate Guitar | 8/10 stars |

Ultimate Guitar gave the album a positive review, stating that the band has grown and developed into some truly interesting modern metal, while also adding, "this album feels like it was made to be played as a full album and it flows from one track to the next in a pleasant way and none of the tracks are subpar." Sputnikmusic also praised the album, saying, "Monuments add a slice of melody to their crushingly groovy sound" giving the album an 'excellent' score. They also praised the album's production, stating: "The production here is also the best it's ever been – the stringed instruments here are punchy, powerful and clear, and the vocals sound natural and unmolested. The smoothness of the mix balances out the aggressive nature of the music to create something that rests somewhere in between." According to a review by The Circle Pit, "In a sea of DeathDjentCore bands, Monuments are one of the few that set the bar higher for themselves with every release and also set a benchmark for similar music/musicians to be ranked by", and they state the album is "definitely worth your time and money and more."

== Track listing ==
| No. | Title | Writer(s) | Length |
|---|---|---|---|
| 1. | "I, the Creator (The Indulger, The Oppressor)" | John Browne, Chris Barretto, Matt Rose | 3:56 |
| 2. | "Origin of Escape" | John Browne, Chris Barretto | 4:03 |
| 3. | "Atlas (Higgs Boson)" | John Browne, Chris Barretto, Matt Rose | 3:22 |
| 4. | "Horcrux" | John Browne, Chris Barretto | 4:46 |
| 5. | "Garden of Sankhara" | John Browne, Chris Barretto | 4:48 |
| 6. | "The Alchemist" | John Browne, Chris Barretto | 4:35 |
| 7. | "Quasimodo" | John Browne, Chris Barretto | 5:02 |
| 8. | "Saga City" | John Browne, Olly Steele, Chris Barretto | 4:44 |
| 9. | "Jinn" | John Browne, Chris Barretto | 4:08 |
| 10. | "I, the Destroyer" | John Browne, Olly Steele, Chris Barretto | 5:46 |
| 11. | "Samsara" | Chris Barretto, Mike Malyan | 5:11 |
| Total length: | | | 50:21 |

Additional Tracks - Live At Euroblast Festival 2013
| No. | Title | Writer(s) | Length |
|---|---|---|---|
| 12. | "Degenerate" | John Browne, Matt Rose | 4:17 |
| 13. | "The Uncollective" | John Browne, Matt Rose, Olly Steele | 4:01 |
| 14. | "Regenerate" | John Browne, Matt Rose, Adam Swan | 5:53 |

== Personnel ==
Monuments

- Chris Barretto – vocals, saxophone, concept
- John Browne – guitar, production, mixing, mastering, concept
- Olly Steele – guitar
- Adam Swan – bass
- Mike Malyan – drums, samples

Additional personnel

- Romesh Dodangoda – drum production
- Eyal Levi – vocal production, vocal mixing
- Robert Turner, Liam Ross and Felix Mercer – drum engineering
- Emilio Arteaga – assistant vocal engineering
- Fall McKenzie – artwork, layout, design
- Kris Davidson – additional artwork
