= Reconciler. Refiner. Igniter. =

Studio album by Fallstar
- Released: March 29, 2011
- Genres: Christian metal; metalcore
- Length: 44:57
- Labels: Come&Live!

Fallstar chronology
Your Eyes Don't Lie (2007)	Reconciler. Refiner. Igniter. (2011)	Backdraft (2013)

Reconciler. Refiner. Igniter. is the first studio album from Fallstar. Come&Live! Records released the album on March 29, 2011.

== Critical reception ==
Professional ratings
Review scores
Source	Rating
Christ Core	3.5/5 stars
Cross Rhythms	9/10 squares
HM Magazine	4.5/5 stars
Indie Vision Music	4/5 stars
Jesus Freak Hideout	4/5 stars
Louder Than the Music	3.5/5 stars
The New Review	2.5/5 stars

Awarding the album four and a half stars from HM Magazine, Brittany McNeal states, "Fallstar has etched itself a niche in hardcore music." Graeme Crawford, rating the album a nine out of ten at Cross Rhythms, says, "It may be gloriously chaotic but Reconciler, Refiner, Igniter packs a powerful spiritual punch." Giving the album four stars for Jesus Freak Hideout, Scott Fryberger writes, "Reconciler. Refiner. Igniter. is a good source of Spirit-filled hardcore." Eric Pettersson, awarding the album four stars at Indie Vision Music, writes, "With a very bass-heavy brand of metalcore, these guys deliver a message of God's love overcoming the darkness and consuming this world with God's power."

Rating the album three and a half stars from Christ Core, Bryce Cooley states, "What kept me listening to Reconciler. Refiner. Igniter was the constant surprises speckled throughout." Jono Davies, giving the album three and a half stars for Louder Than the Music, says, "If you want distorted screaming vocals singing about hope, revival, community and love, then look no further than Fallstar!" Awarding the album two and a half stars by The New Review, Anthony Gannaio writes, "Despite the album's remarkable shortcomings, do not count Fallstar out."

== Track listing ==
All tracks are written by Fallstar.

No.	Title	Length
1.	"Hunters"	4:14
2.	"Black Clouds"	3:41
3.	"Reconciler. Refiner. Igniter."	4:35
4.	"Horse Without a Rider"	2:47
5.	"Saratoga Springs"	3:22
6.	"Lurchers"	5:36
7.	"Drunkaholics Anonymous"	6:00
8.	"Face the Floor"	3:32
9.	"Contortionist"	4:37
10.	"Windows"	6:34
Total length:		44:57
