= Monuments (metal band) =

British progressive metal band

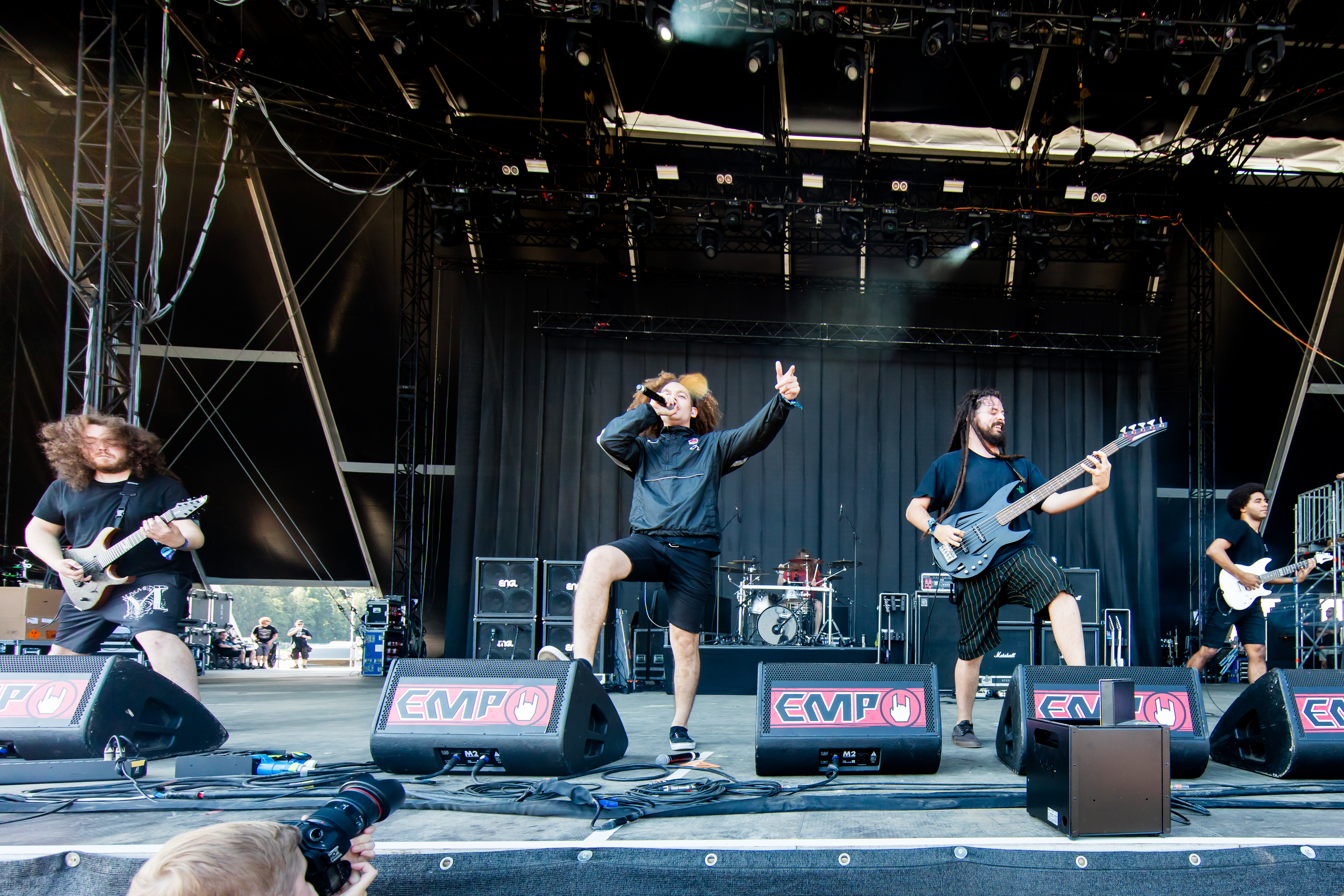
- Monuments performing in 2016

Background information
- Origin: London, England
- Genres: Progressive metal; djent
- Years active: 2007–2024 (hiatus)
- Label: Century Media
- Members: John Browne; Andy Cizek; Werner Erkelens
- Past members: Josh Travis; Neema Askari; Greg Pope; Matt Rose; Anup Sastry; Daniel Lang; Chris Barretto; Olly Steele; Adam Swan; Mike Malyan

Monuments are a British progressive metal band formed by former Fellsilent guitarist John Browne and Tony Danza Tapdance Extravaganza guitarist Josh Travis. The band has released four studio albums through Century Media Records: Gnosis (2012), The Amanuensis (2014), Phronesis (2018) and In Stasis (2022).

== History ==
The band was formed by Fellsilent guitarist John Browne and the Tony Danza Tapdance Extravaganza guitarist Josh Travis filling in for vocals in 2007. After the departure of vocalists Neema Askari and Greg Pope, the band signed with Century Media Records in 2012, announcing the addition of singer Matt Rose the same day. Their debut album, Gnosis, came out on 28 August 2012.

The band took part in the Euroblast European Tour with Jeff Loomis, Vildhjarta, and Stealing Axion. Another European tour with Born of Osiris and After the Burial and The HAARP Machine followed in early 2013. By March 2013, the band parted ways with vocalist Matt Rose. In July 2013, it was announced that former Periphery and Friend For a Foe, current Ever Forthright and The HAARP Machine vocalist Chris Barretto had joined the band.

In December 2013, the band announced via Facebook that they had completed their second album. The drums were recorded in Monnow Valley Studio, Wales with Romesh Dodangoda (Motörhead, Sylosis, Bring Me the Horizon), while the rest of the instruments were tracked DIY by Browne, and the vocals were done with Eyal Levi. In April 2014, it was formally announced that their new album, The Amanuensis, would be released on 23 June 2014.

The band played on the Red Bull Studios Live Stage at Download on Sunday 15 June 2014. In March and April 2015, they supported Australian band Karnivool on their UK and European headline tour. Drummer Mike Malyan left the band during August 2015 due to injuries on his back and shoulder and was replaced by Anup Sastry, the former Intervals drummer. They played at Hevy music festival later that month.

On 16 June 2016, Anup Sastry announced on his Facebook page that he was amicably leaving the band, although he returned in 2018 to record drums for the new album, Phronesis.

In support of the release of the new album, Monuments performed a 31-date tour of the United Kingdom and mainland Europe over October and November with main support from Vola. In January 2019 Monuments performed headline shows in New Zealand, then on the Australian multi-date music festival Progfest.

On 1 July 2019, Monuments announced that Chris Barretto had departed the band due to "personal reasons." They also announced YouTuber Andy Cizek as their fill-in vocalist for the rest of the tour. On 11 October 2019, Monuments announced that Andy Cizek is now their official vocalist. Less than two months later, former drummer Mike Malyan rejoined the band.

On 12 July 2021, Monuments announced that guitarist Olly Steele had left the band to pursue other musical projects. In January 2022, Monuments' fourth album, In Stasis, was announced with a release date of April 15, 2022. In Stasis features Mick Gordon as co-producer, with Spencer Sotelo of Periphery and ex-vocalist Neema Askari as guests. On 31 January 2023, Monuments announced departure of the bassist Adam Swan to pursue his environmental efforts with Soil Ecology Agriculture. His spot was filled with Dutch bassist Werner Erkelens of Aviations.

On May 25, 2023, the band released the standalone single "Nefarious", as a promotion for Charles White's comic book series GodSlap, along with a music video featuring an animation based on the comics.

On April 16, 2024, it was announced Mike Malyan left Monuments for the second time, citing emotional health as the reason for departure.

On August 9, 2024, Monuments announced that guitarist John Browne would take a break due to the ankylosing spondylitis he was diagnosed with a few years earlier, and that the band would go on an indefinite hiatus, withdrawing from a planned US tour with Leprous and Fight the Fight.

== Band members ==
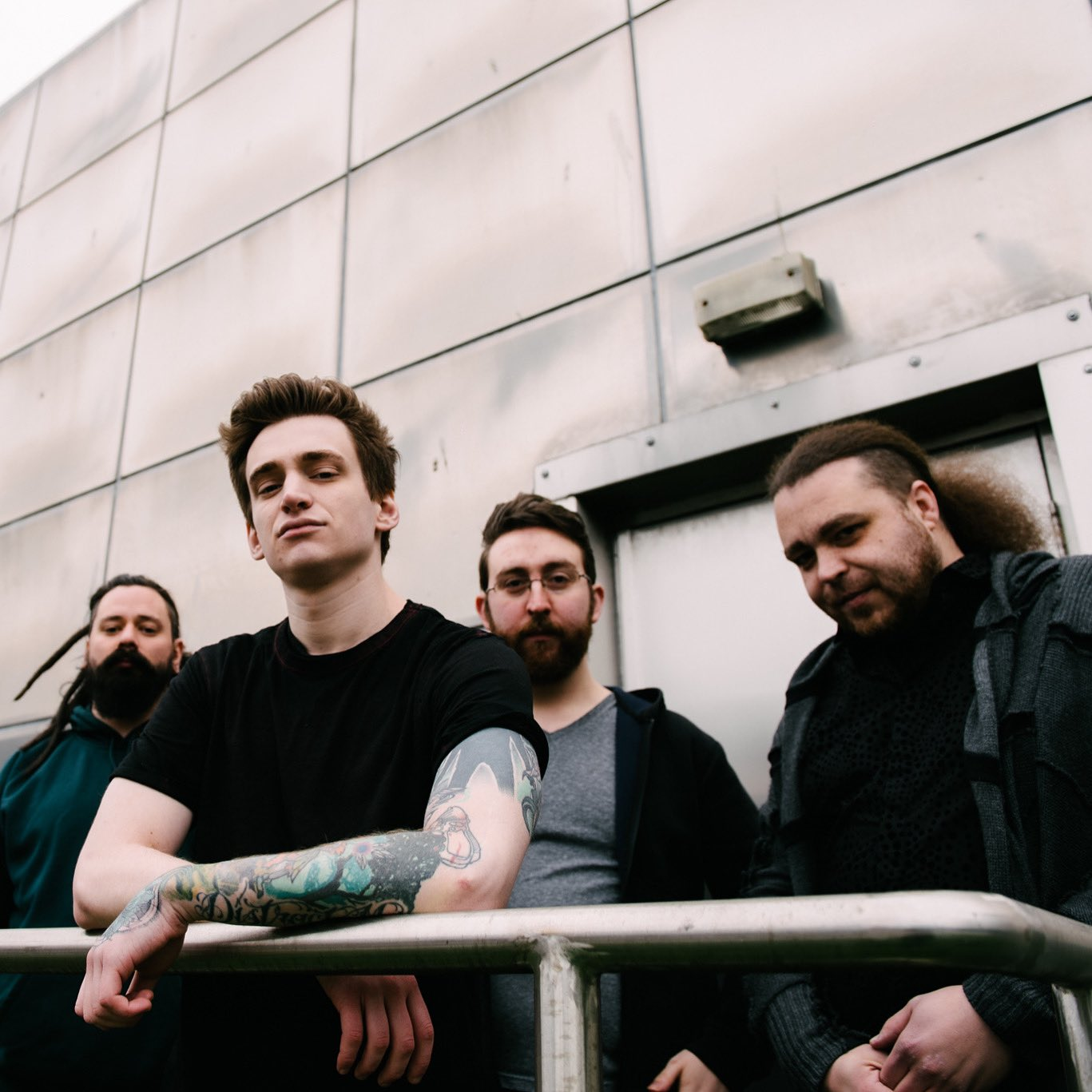
From left to right: Adam Swan, Andy Cizek, Mike Malyan, John Browne

Current members

- John Browne – guitars (2007–2024), bass (2007–2010)
- Andy Cizek – vocals (2019–2024)
- Werner Erkelens – bass (2023–2024; touring member 2022)

Former members

- Josh Travis – vocals, guitars, bass, drums (2007–2010)
- Neema Askari – vocals (2010–2011)
- Greg Pope – vocals (2010–2011)
- Matt Rose – vocals (2012–2013)
- Anup Sastry – drums (2015–2016, 2018)
- Daniel Lang – drums (2016–2018, 2018–2019)
- Chris Barretto – vocals (2013–2019)
- Olly Steele – guitars (2011–2021)
- Adam Swan – bass (2010–2023)
- Mike Malyan – drums (2010–2015, 2019–2024); samples (2014–2015, 2019–2024)

Touring musicians

- Jake Monson– guitars (2010)
- Paul Ortiz – guitars (2010–2011)
- Kaan Tasan – vocals (2010)
- John Gillen – drums (2014)
- Alex Rüdinger – drums (2014)

== Discography ==
=== Studio albums ===
- Gnosis (2012, Century Media Records)
- The Amanuensis (2014, Century Media Records)
- Phronesis (2018, Century Media Records)
- In Stasis (2022, Century Media Records)

=== Demos ===
- ...And It Will End in Dissonance (2006)
- We Are the Foundation (2010)

=== Singles ===
- "Doxa" (2012)
- "Degenerate" (2012)
- "I, the Creator" (2014)
- "Origin of Escape" (2014)
- "The Alchemist" (2014)
- "Atlas" (2014)
- "A.W.O.L" (2018)
- "Leviathan" (2018)
- "Mirror Image" (2018)
- "Animus" (2020)
- "Deadnest" (2021)
- "Lavos" (2021)
- "Cardinal Red" (2022)
- "False Providence" (2022)
- "Nefarious" (2023)
