= Fallstar =

American metalcore band

Background information
- Origin: Portland, Oregon
- Genres: Metalcore, Christian hardcore
- Years active: 2007–present
- Labels: Facedown, Come&Live!, Rat Family
- Members: Chris Ratzlaff; Bryan Ratzlaff; Jeff Ratzlaff; Morgan Weisz
- Past members: Justin Raymond Haag; Jason Brown; Cody Carrier; Jake Barnes; JonPaul Lucas
- Website: facebook.com/Fallstar

Fallstar is an American metalcore band from Portland, Oregon. Founded in 2007, the original lineup consisted of lead vocalist Chris Ratzlaff, guitarists Justin Raymond Haag and Jason Brown, bassist Bryan Ratzlaff, and drummer Cody Carrier.

== Background ==
Fallstar is a Christian metal band from Portland, Oregon. Their members at their inception in 2007 were lead vocalist, Chris Ratzlaff, guitarists Justin Raymond Haag and Jason Brown, bass guitarist Bryan Ratzlaff, and drummer Cody Carrier. Due to their mutual influences, Fallstar was originally conceived of as a Creed cover band. However, upon Creed's release of Full Circle, the members of Fallstar unanimously agreed that they needed to write their own music because, in their opinion, "Full Circle lacked the melodic complexities and the Christian proselytizing that initially inspired Fallstar to be founded." Their group is now four members three Ratzlaff's, Chris, Bryan, and Jeff, alongside, Morgan Weisz.

== Music history ==
Fallstar released one extended play, Your Eyes Don't Lie, Independently in 2007 with, they later released it with non-profit organization Come&Live! in 2010. The following year, their first studio album, Reconciler. Refiner. Igniter., was released by Come&Live! in 2011. After a national tour with Christian ministry XXXChurch.com, they signed with Facedown Records, who released their sophomore album Backdraft, in 2013, featuring guest vocals by Matty Mullins of Memphis May Fire. After some minor dispute with Facedown, the band left the label, became unsigned, and after 2 years of off and on touring, went to crowd fund their latest record Future Golden Age through a Kickstarter campaign, releasing it on their own independent start up label, Rat Family Records, in 2015.

== Members ==
Current

- Chris Ratzlaff – vocals (2007–present)
- Bryan Ratzlaff – guitar, (2015–present); bass (2007–2015)
- Cody Carrier – bass (2018–present)
- Morgan Weisz – drums (2015–present)

Former

- Justin Raymond Haag – guitar (2007–2015)
- Jason Brown – guitar (2007–2015)
- Jeff Ratzlaff – bass (2013–2015)

Touring Members

- Johnie Collins – guitar (2011–2013, My Favorite Season)

== Discography ==
Studio albums

- Reconciler. Refiner. Igniter. (March 29, 2011, Come&Live! Records)
- Backdraft (April 16, 2013, Facedown)
- Future Golden Age (December 8, 2015, Rat Family Records)
- Sunbreather (February 12, 2021, Facedown)
- Sacred Mirrors (July 14, 2023, Facedown)
- Please Set Me On Fire (2026, Rat Family Records)

EPs

- Your Eyes Don't Lie (2007, Independent, 2010, Come&Live! Records)
