= Backdraft (album) =

Studio album by Fallstar
- Released: April 16, 2013
- Genre: Christian metal; metalcore
- Length: 37:10
- Label: Facedown
- Producer: Kris Crummett

Fallstar chronology
Reconciler. Refiner. Igniter. (2011)	Backdraft (2013)	Future Golden Age (2015)

Backdraft is the second studio album from Fallstar, released by Facedown Records on April 16, 2013. Fallstar worked with Kris Crummett for the production of this album.

== Critical reception ==
Professional ratings
Review scores
Source	Rating
Cross Rhythms	7/10 squares
Exclaim!	4/10
HM Magazine	4/5 stars
Indie Vision Music	4/5 stars
Jesus Freak Hideout	4.5/5 stars 4/5 stars

Awarding the album four stars from HM Magazine, Sarah Brehm states, "Fallstar’s Backdraft is metalcore at its heart, but still seamlessly pulls from a myriad of genres—melodic hardcore, punk, rap-rock, electronic—to create an album that’s hard not to like." Mark Sherwood, rating the album a seven out of ten for Cross Rhythms, writes, "overall a strongish album." Giving the album four and a half stars at Jesus Freak Hideout, Michael Weaver says, "Fallstar has produced a solid product in Backdraft." Timothy Estabrooks, awarding the album four stars for Jesus Freak Hideout, states, "Backdraft is a phenomenal release from a band that really deserves a lot of recognition right now." Lee Brown, giving the album four stars at Indie Vision Music, writes, "With Backdraft, they have grown musically, vocally, and as song writers." Rating the album a four out of ten from Exclaim!, says, the band "stray from having any significant singles or memorable solos rise to the forefront, although the album as a whole stands against the grain within their particular genre."

== Track listing ==
No.	Title	Writer(s)	Length
1.	"Malbec Blood"	Fallstar; Bryan Ratzlaff	1:01
2.	"Shallow Believer" (featuring Matty Mullins of Memphis May Fire)	Jason Brown; Fallstar; Chris Ratzlaff	3:07
3.	"El Rey"	Fallstar; C. Ratzlaff	3:51
4.	"Drags, Drugs and Bones"	Fallstar; C. Ratzlaff	3:49
5.	"Yours until the End"	Fallstar; C. Ratzlaff	3:52
6.	"The Valley"	Fallstar; C. Ratzlaff	4:30
7.	"Alexandria 363" (featuring Living Witness)	Fallstar; C. Ratzlaff	3:04
8.	"It's in Our Blood"	Fallstar; C. Ratzlaff	3:57
9.	"Eclipse"	Fallstar; C. Ratzlaff	0:56
10.	"The New World"	Brown; Fallstar; C. Ratzlaff	4:25
11.	"Set My Face like Flint"	Fallstar; B. Ratzlaff	4:38
Total length:			37:10

== Personnel ==
Fallstar

- Chris Ratzlaff – vocals
- Justin Raymond Haag – guitar
- Jason Brown – guitar
- Bryan Ratzlaff- bass
- Cody Carrier – drums

Production

- Kris Crummett – production
