= Embers in Ashes =

- Origin: Birmingham, Alabama
- Genres: Alternative rock, Christian rock
- Years active: 2010–present
- Labels: Red Cord, Independent
- Members: Jeremy Bates; Drew Duvall; Andrew Hargrave
- Past members: Robert Paul; Mike Tobey-McKenzie; Ryan Jackson
- Website: embersinashes.com

Embers in Ashes is an American Christian rock band from Birmingham, Alabama, that formed in 2010. The band's current lineup consists of Jeremy Bates, Drew Duvall, and Andrew Hargrave. They released Outsiders with Red Cord Records in 2012; the song "Then You Came" charted on the Christian rock charts published by Billboard magazine. In 2014, the band released Killers & Thieves with Shamrock Records; the songs "Into My Arms", "The Mirror", and "What Matters" charted.

== Music history ==
The group formed in 2010 and released their freshman studio album in 2012, Outsiders, through Red Cord Records. The song "Then You Came" charted on the Billboard magazine Christian Rock chart at No. 16. Their sophomore album, Killers & Thieves, was released independently in 2014. Three songs from the album charted—"Into My Arms" at No. 8, "The Mirror" at No. 6, and "What Matters" at No. 5.

== Members ==
=== Current members ===
- Jeremy Bates
- Drew Duvall
- Andrew Hargrave

=== Former Members ===
- Robert Paul
- Mike Tobey-McKenzie
- Ryan Jackson
- Rodd Thomas
- Josh Maughon

== Discography ==
Studio albums

- Outsiders (August 28, 2012, Red Cord Records)
- Killers & Thieves (February 25, 2014, Independent)

EPs

- Sorrow Scars EP (September 7, 2010, Independent)

Singles

| Year | Single | Chart positions |
| Year | Single | US Chr Rock |
|---|---|---|
| 2012 | "Then You Came" | 16 |
| 2014 | "Into My Arms" | 8 |
| 2014 | "The Mirror" | 6 |
| 2015 | "What Matters" | 5 |
