= Beau Bokan =

American singer

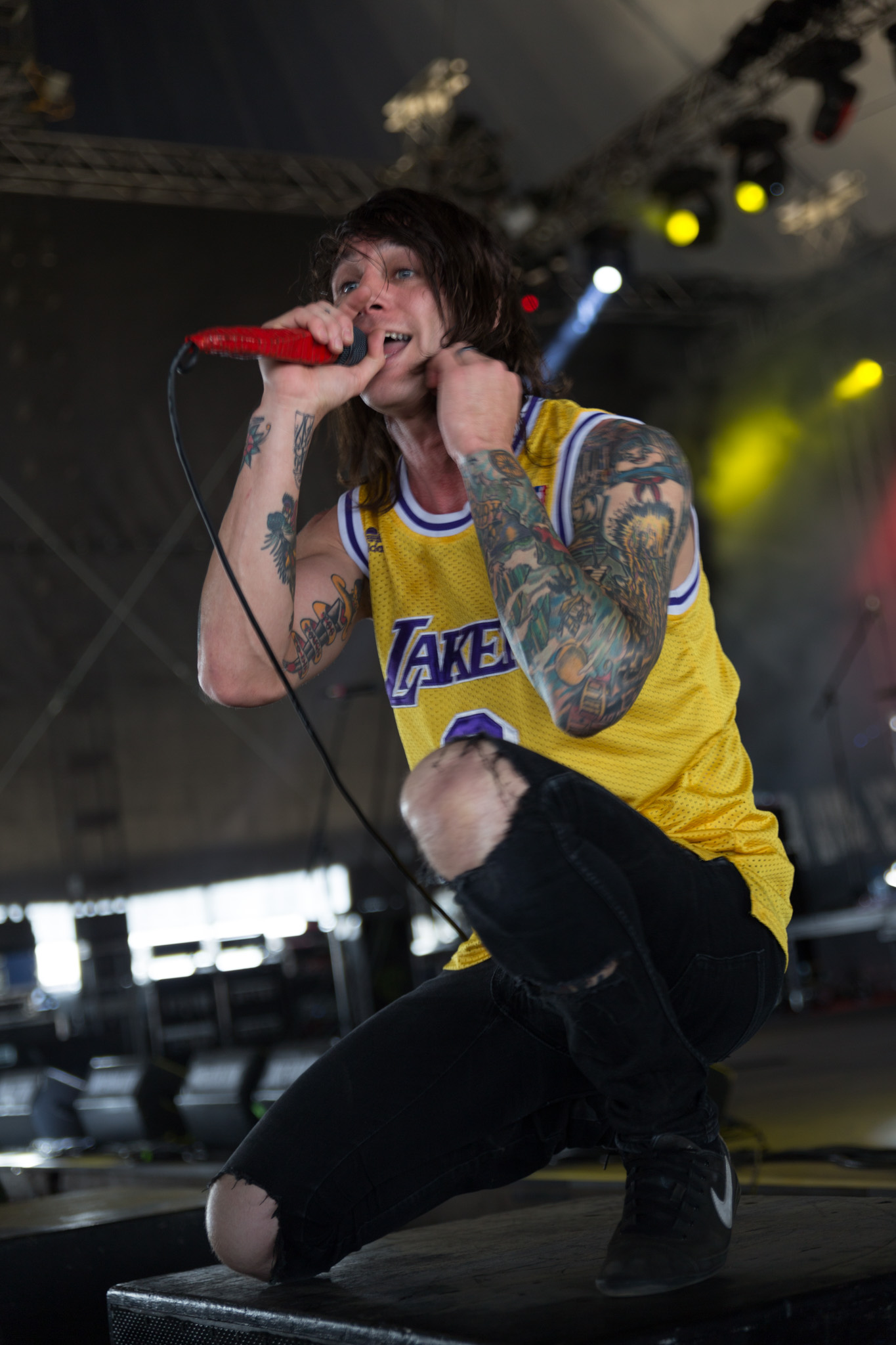
- Beau Bokan with Blessthefall at With Full Force 2014

Background information
- Born: November 30, 1981 (age 44); Huntington Beach, California, U.S.
- Origin: Los Angeles, California, U.S.
- Genres: Metalcore; post-hardcore; electronic rock (early)
- Occupations: Singer; songwriter; musician
- Instruments: Vocals; keyboards; bass
- Years active: 2003–present
- Member of: Blessthefall
- Formerly of: Take the Crown
- Spouse: Lights (m. 2012)

Beau Mark Bokan (born November 30, 1981) is an American singer best known as the vocalist of the metalcore band Blessthefall and the former vocalist of Take the Crown.

== Background ==
In September 2008, Bokan joined Blessthefall as the vocalist to replace Craig Mabbitt, who left the band due to personal differences and later joined Escape the Fate. Bokan recorded five studio albums with Blessthefall before their hiatus in 2020. However, the band returned in May 2023, releasing their first song in five years, "Wake the Dead", in the same month.

== Personal life ==
Bokan is of half Mexican descent. He married Canadian electro-pop singer Lights on May 12, 2012. On November 4, 2013, the couple announced that they were expecting their first child. On February 15, 2014, Lights gave birth to a daughter.

Bokan is Roman Catholic. He follows a straight edge lifestyle and has been a vegetarian since 2017.

== Discography ==
with Take the Crown

- Take the Crown (2006)
- Let the Games Begin (2006)
- Relapse React (2008)

with Blessthefall

- Witness (2009)
- Awakening (2011)
- Hollow Bodies (2013)
- To Those Left Behind (2015)
- Hard Feelings (2018)
- Gallows (2025)

=== Guest appearances ===
Year	Song	Artist	Album	Source
2010	"Lying Through Your Teeth Doesn't Count as Flossing"	Greeley Estates	No Rain, No Rainbow	
2010	"The Boys Are Back in Town" (featuring Alex Varkatzas, Travis Miguel, Dan Jacobs, Evan MacCarthy, Joe Mullen, Brandon Bolmer and Sam Carter)	Atreyu	Covers of the Damned	
2014	"Lucky Ones"	Lights	Little Machines	
2015	"Nothing to Lose"	FigureItOut	Nothing to Lose	
2026	"The Best Combo Meal on the Worst Night of my Life"	Wendy's	Songs to Listen to in a Wendy's Parking Lot	
