= Future Golden Age =

Studio album by Fallstar
- Released: December 8, 2015
- Recorded: November 2014–November 2015
- Studio: Rain City Audio; Rat Family Records (Portland, Oregon)
- Genre: Christian metal; punk rock; alternative rock; rapcore
- Length: 51:36
- Label: Rat Family
- Producer: Fallstar

Fallstar chronology
Backdraft (2013)	Future Golden Age (2015)

Future Golden Age is the third studio album from Fallstar. Rat Family Records released the album on December 8, 2015. The album was funded via a Kickstarter campaign, after the group left Facedown Records.

== Critical reception ==
Professional ratings
Review scores
Source	Rating
HM Magazine	4/5 stars
Jesus Freak Hideout	3.5/5 stars 4.5/5 stars 4/5 stars

Ben Rickaby, indicating in a four star review by HM Magazine, recognizes, "Future Golden Age isn't strictly metalcore, and it is a fabulous album for fans of the band and for fans of the metalcore world." Awarding the album three and a half stars at Jesus Freak Hideout, Michael Weaver states, "Future Golden Age doesn't reach the level of Backdraft." Scott Fryberger, rating the album three and a half stars for Jesus Freak Hideout, describes, "Future Golden Age is a solid album, but feels a little long and maybe slightly disjointed. It gets better with repeat listens, but it doesn't have the staying power that Backdraft has. That being said, and with the disappointing offerings of Christian heavy music in 2015, Fallstar's latest is among the highlights of the genre for the year." Giving the album four and a half stars from Jesus Freak Hideout, Lucas Munachen writes, "Future Golden Age closes 2015 in epic fashion". Mark Rice, signaling in a four star review at Jesus Freak Hideout, describes, "the band's mixture of punk, alt rock, rapcore, and metal is easy to digest and fun to rock out to."

== Track listing ==
All tracks are written by Fallstar.

No.	Title	Length
1.	"What Roberta Sparrow Said"	2:48
2.	"Spit"	3:18
3.	"Circle Above Me" (A Silent Voice)	4:16
4.	"Death Worship"	3:40
5.	"Impossible Dreamers" (MFTM)	4:11
6.	"Summit"	3:40
7.	"Write My Name in Gold"	3:11
8.	"Radio" (NW Hesh)	3:21
9.	"Interlude"	1:05
10.	"Slaves"	3:17
11.	"Under the Gun"	3:36
12.	"Dance in the Desert"	3:59
13.	"This Is My E.L.F. Weapon"	1:25
14.	"Eros & Psyche"	4:13
15.	"Divine Spark"	4:32
16.	"Outro"	1:04
Total length:		51:36
