= Blessthefall =

American metalcore band

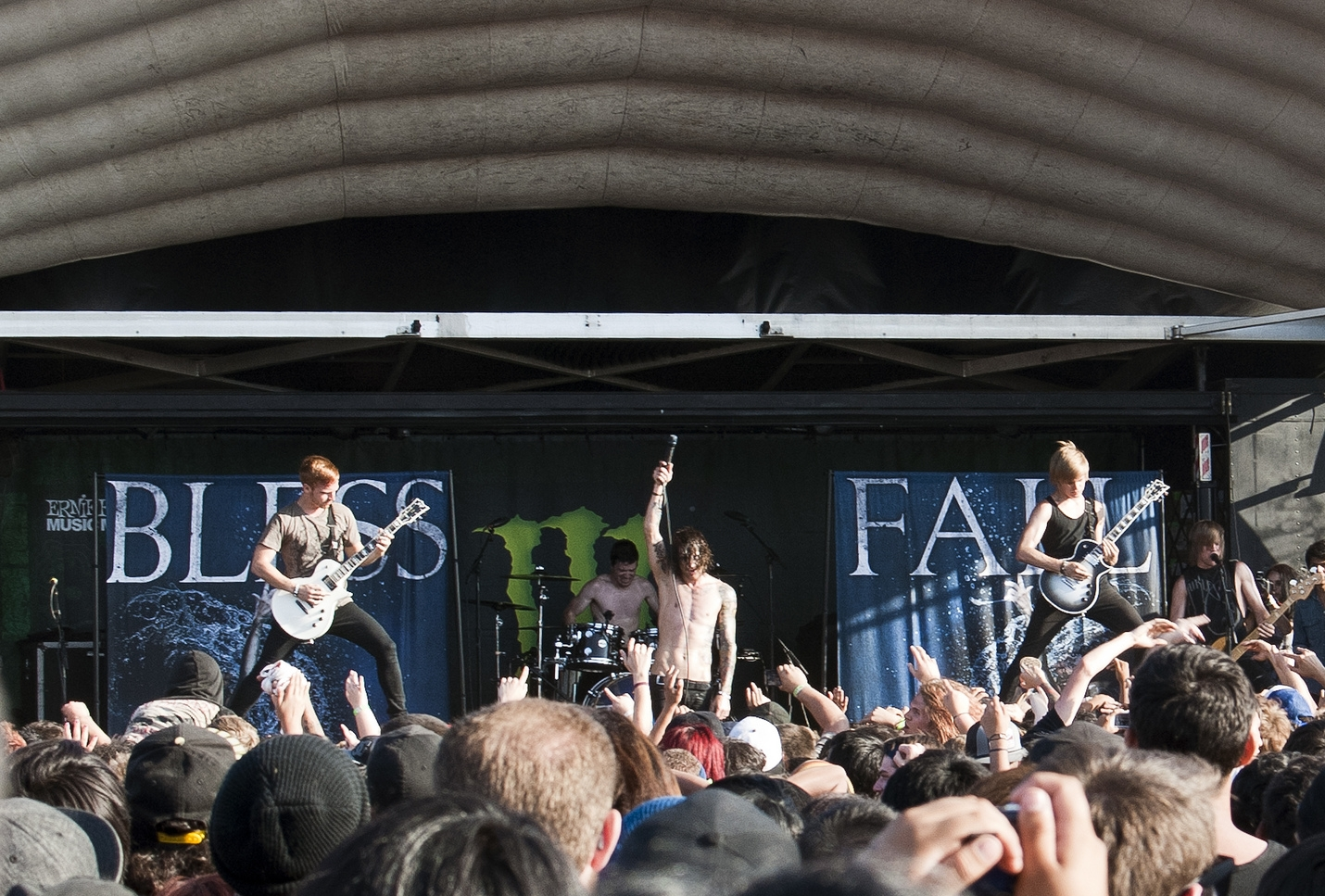
- Blessthefall live at Vans Warped Tour 2012

Background information
- Origin: Phoenix, Arizona, U.S.
- Genres: Metalcore; post-hardcore; screamo
- Years active: 2004–2020; 2023–present
- Labels: Ferret; Science; Fearless; Rise
- Spinoffs: The Word Alive
- Members: Jared Warth; Eric Lambert; Beau Bokan; Elliott Gruenberg
- Past members: Andrew Barr; Miles Bergsma; Craig Mabbitt; Michael Frisby; Matt Traynor

Blessthefall (stylized as blessthefall prior to 2013 or BLESSTHEFALL since 2013) is an American metalcore band from Phoenix, Arizona, signed to Rise Records.

The band was founded in 2004 by guitarist Mike Frisby, drummer Matt Traynor, and bassist and vocalist Jared Warth. Their debut studio album, His Last Walk, with original vocalist Craig Mabbitt, was released November 7, 2006.

Mabbitt left the band in 2007 and would replace Ronnie Radke in Escape the Fate. In 2008, the band announced Beau Bokan as their permanent new vocalist. Their second studio album, Witness, and first with Bokan, was released on October 6, 2009.

Their third studio album, Awakening, was released on October 4, 2011. Their fourth studio album, Hollow Bodies, was released on August 20, 2013. To Those Left Behind is the band's fifth studio album, released on September 18, 2015. Their sixth studio album, Hard Feelings, was released on March 23, 2018. Following Traynor's departure, Warth became the band's only remaining original member. In May 2023, the band returned from a brief hiatus with the release of "Wake the Dead", their first song in five years.

== History ==
=== Formation, line-up changes and His Last Walk (2004–2007) ===
Blessthefall grew out of the high school practice sessions of rhythm guitarist Mike Frisby, lead guitarist Miles Bergsma, drummer Matt Traynor, bassist and vocalist Jared Warth, keyboardist and vocalist Andrew Barr and later, vocalist Craig Mabbitt. Mabbitt's arrival resulted in Barr moving to strictly keyboards. Barr then departed in early 2005, with Warth picking up the keyboards when necessary. After founding member Miles Bergsma left to attend college at the Berklee College of Music in Boston, they released a three-track EP and newcomer Eric Lambert (Bergmas's replacement) became the lead guitarist to form their first stable line-up. Phoenix-area gigs with Greeley Estates and an openly religious orientation got the band local press and a deal with Warner subsidiary, Science Records. The band then toured with Alesana and Norma Jean across the United States and Canada. Their debut album, His Last Walk, was released on April 10, 2007, to mixed reviews. It peaked at No. 32 on the U.S. Billboard Heatseekers chart. The album sold over 65,000 copies, and its singles sold over 100,000 copies.

Blessthefall toured with Escape the Fate, LoveHateHero, Before Their Eyes, and Dance Gavin Dance on the Black on Black tour during September and October 2007. They were also part of the Underground Operations Tour and Loathing Tour 2007, opening for Protest the Hero and All That Remains, along with fellow opening bands, Threat Signal and the Holly Springs Disaster. They were a part of From First to Last's fall headlining tour, starting November 1 with A Skylit Drive and Vanna. The band also completed the entire 2007 Warped Tour circuit nationwide.

While on their first European tour (with Silverstein) in late 2007, Craig Mabbitt left the band during the United Kingdom portion to spend more time with his family. For the remainder of the tour, Jared Warth filled in for vocals while playing keyboards. Mabbitt joined Escape the Fate, and recorded the album This War Is Ours with them. When asked to rejoin Blessthefall, he declined. The last song the band recorded featuring Mabbitt "I Wouldn't Quit If Everyone Quit", was released on the reissue of the His Last Walk album. On September 26, 2008, the band announced that they had made Beau Bokan the new lead singer and keyboardist. Bokan joined the band after leaving Take the Crown.

=== Witness (2009–2010) ===
In May 2009, after their tour with Silverstein, Norma Jean, and Before Their Eyes, the band headed into the studio to record their second album, Witness. On May 13 the band signed to Fearless Records and worked on the album with producer Elvis Baskette.

On June 3, the band announced via MySpace that they were officially finished with the recording of their new album and that it was to be released in the autumn. They also had a mid-year tour with August Burns Red and Enter Shikari. In July, Blessthefall released a song clip on their MySpace page titled "God Wears Gucci", released on iTunes for download on August 11, 2009. In September 2009, the band uploaded another track on their MySpace page titled "What's Left of Me". Witness was released on October 6, 2009.

In June 2010, Blessthefall toured New Zealand in support of Saosin, and in Australia in support of Story of the Year and Saosin. Blessthefall played across Auckland, Sydney, Melbourne, Brisbane and Adelaide.

After the release of Witness, the band co-headlined the Atticus Fall Tour with Finch, Drop Dead, Gorgeous, and Vanna from October 10, 2009, through to November 19. Other bands on the tour included Of Mice & Men and Let's Get It.

In October 2009, the band announced on YouTube that they were working on a music video for "What's Left of Me", which was released December 14, 2009, on MySpace Metal.

In 2009, the band took home the Best Noise/Screamo Band Award, as well as the Best Hardcore Band Award at the 2009 Arizona Ska Punk Awards. One year later, the band was once again awarded the Best Hardcore Band Award at the 2010 awards ceremony.

In April 2010, the band was featured on the Punk Goes Classic Rock album, covering "Dream On" by Aerosmith.

Their song "To Hell and Back", released on Witness, was released on the soundtrack to Ubisoft's Tom Clancy's Splinter Cell: Conviction. The game trailer was released on April 9, 2010.

=== Frisby's departure and Awakening (2011–2012) ===
On February 15, 2011, the band announced that Mike Frisby had left the band to pursue another path leaving bassist and vocalist Jared Warth and drummer Matt Traynor the remaining two founding members of the band. Elliott Gruenberg, formerly of Before Their Eyes, Legacy, and Settle the Sky, would be permanently on guitar. Bokan confirmed that Blessthefall would not play at Warped Tour 2011, but rather would be recording their third full-length album, which began in Orlando, Florida, on May 17, 2011. Michael "Elvis" Baskette, who produced their previous album, also produced this effort. The band had hoped to feature guest vocalists including Ronnie Radke of Falling in Reverse (previously of Escape the Fate) and Tim Lambesis of As I Lay Dying, but it was later confirmed that there would be no guest vocals.

Blessthefall joined Emmure, Alesana, Motionless in White and other bands on the All Stars Tour. The band headlined the Fearless Friends tour with The Word Alive, Motionless in White, Tonight Alive, and Chunk! No Captain Chunk!. They released the official video of "Promised Ones" on November 11, 2011, which starts with the intro song of the album titled Awakening. According to a video interview with Lambert and Bokan, Blessthefall planned on entering the studio in February to record an EP with Tim Lambesis of As I Lay Dying. Later Matt Traynor confirmed that this was not true.

=== Hollow Bodies (2012–2014) ===
On October 4, 2012, the band confirmed that they were writing a fourth album. Recording of this album started on April 19, 2013 and finished on May 21, 2013. Hollow Bodies was subsequently released on August 20, 2013, reaching No. 15 on the Billboard 200 album charts with 21,888 copies sold in its first week. The entire album was actually streamed through Billboard's website one week before the actual release. Joey Sturgis produced the album.

Three singles were released, including "You Wear a Crown But You're No King", "Déjà Vu" and "See You on the Outside".

The band toured in the Warped Tour 2013, alongside Motion City Soundtrack, Big D and the Kids Table, Five Knives, Itch, Echosmith and Goldhouse.

On January 17, 2014, the band announced their upcoming North American tour to promote Hollow Bodies.

On December 10, 2014, the band was announced as part of Warped Tour 2015.

=== To Those Left Behind, Hard Feelings and hiatus (2015–2020) ===
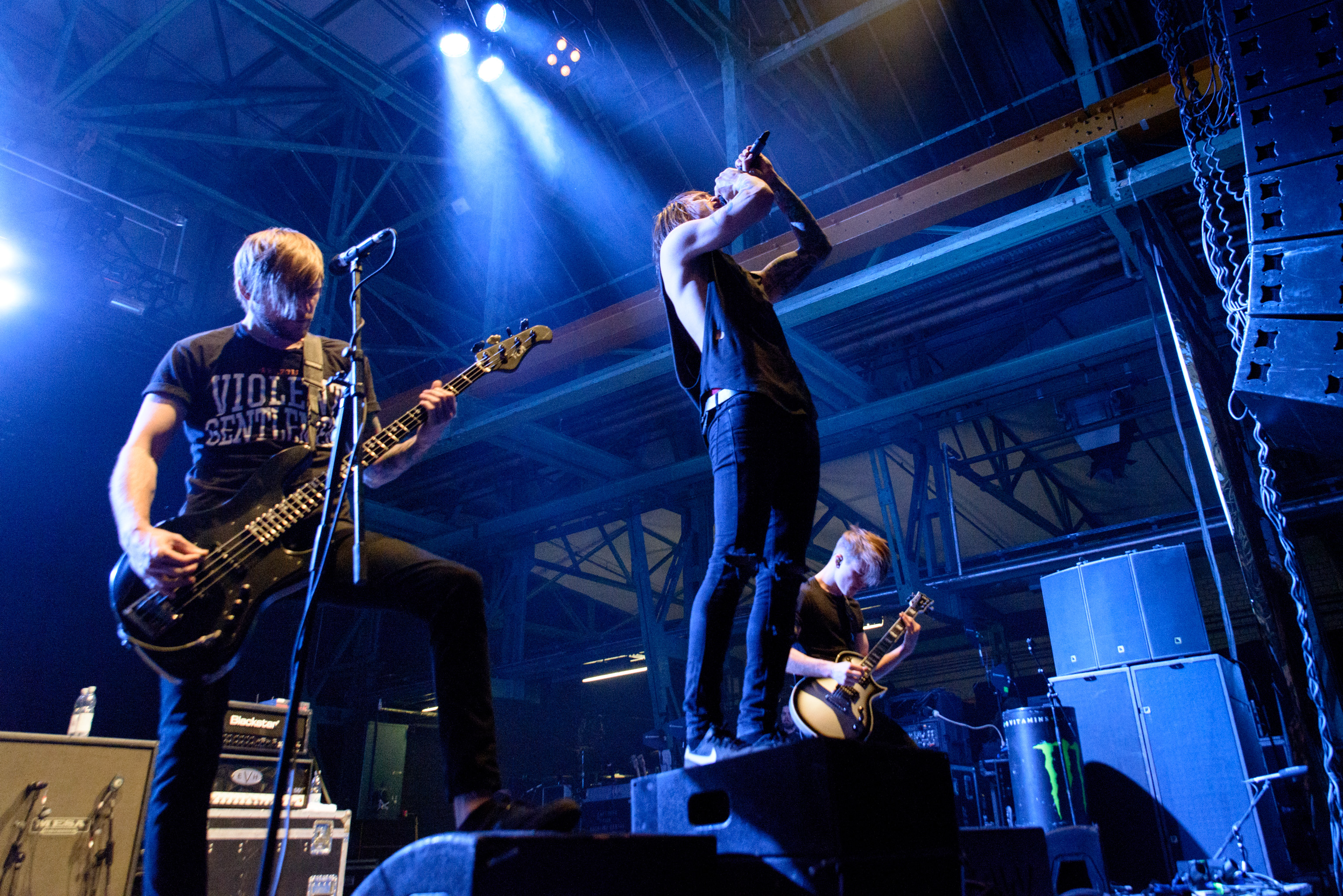
Blessthefall performing in Germany in 2016

On May 1, 2015, the band announced they were working on a new album. On June 11, 2015, they announced that it would be titled To Those Left Behind. It was released on September 18, 2015. On July 14, the band released the official audio for the song "Up in Flames" from the album. On August 4, the band announced the release date of their second single, "Walk on Water", which was released on August 7 along with the online preorders.

On September 28, 2016, the band announced they were touring with Crown the Empire, New Years Day, and Too Close to Touch. The band was announced on March 22, 2017, to be playing on Warped Tour 2017. On January 26, 2018, they announced they have signed a new record deal with Rise Records. Their sixth studio album, Hard Feelings, was released through Rise Records, on March 23. On August 17, 2018, drummer Matt Traynor announced he would be departing from the band after their headlining Hard Feelings tour with The Word Alive, citing his family as the main reason.

After a ten year anniversary tour for Witness in the latter half of 2019, the band ceased to update their social media accounts, with the last tweet being posted on January 9, 2020. In December 2022, the four remaining members removed the band from their personal social media profiles, implying the band had come to a quiet end.

=== Return and Gallows (2023–present) ===
On May 22, 2023, the band announced their return and released their first piece of new material in five years. The single, titled "Wake the Dead", was released on May 23, and the band announced a 10-year anniversary tour for their Hollow Bodies album, with Caskets, Kingdom of Giants, and Dragged Under to take place throughout August and September in the US and Canada.

On August 22, 2024, the band released the single, titled "Drag Me Under" featuring the band, Alpha Wolf, on their YouTube channel through Rise Records.

On June 17, 2025, the band released another single, "Mallxcore", along with the official announcement of the album Gallows, which was released on September 5, 2025.

== Musical style ==
The band's style has been described as metalcore, post-hardcore, Christian metal (although frontman Beau Bokan has stated that they don't want to be considered a Christian band), screamo, and pop screamo. AllMusic stated that the band had influence from nu metal and hip-hop music.

Blessthefall have cited influences including Alexisonfire, Funeral for a Friend, Saosin, In Memory, Yesterdays Rising, Fordirelifesake, Underoath, Hopesfall, As I Lay Dying, It Dies Today, the Bled, 50 Cent, Blink 182 and Michael Jackson.

== Band members ==
Current

- Jared Warth – bass (2004–2020, 2023–present; studio only between 2007 and 2008); unclean vocals, keyboards (2004–2020, 2023–present)
- Eric Lambert – lead guitar, backing vocals (2005–2020, 2023–present); clean vocals (2007–2008)
- Beau Bokan – clean vocals, keyboards (2008–2020, 2023–present); bass (2023–present; live only)
- Elliott Gruenberg – rhythm guitar, backing vocals (2011–2020, 2023–present)

Touring

- Aiden Louis – bass (2007–2008)
- Conor White – drums, percussion (2018–2019)
- Jared Fron – drums, percussion (2023–present)

Former

- Matt Traynor – drums, percussion (2004–2018)
- Mike Frisby – rhythm guitar (2004–2011)
- Miles Bergsma – lead guitar (2004–2005)
- Andrew Barr – keyboards (2004–2005); vocals (2004)
- Craig Mabbitt – vocals (2004–2007)

== Discography ==
Studio albums

- His Last Walk (2006)
- Witness (2009)
- Awakening (2011)
- Hollow Bodies (2013)
- To Those Left Behind (2015)
- Hard Feelings (2018)
- Gallows (2025)
