= Matt Traynor =

American drummer

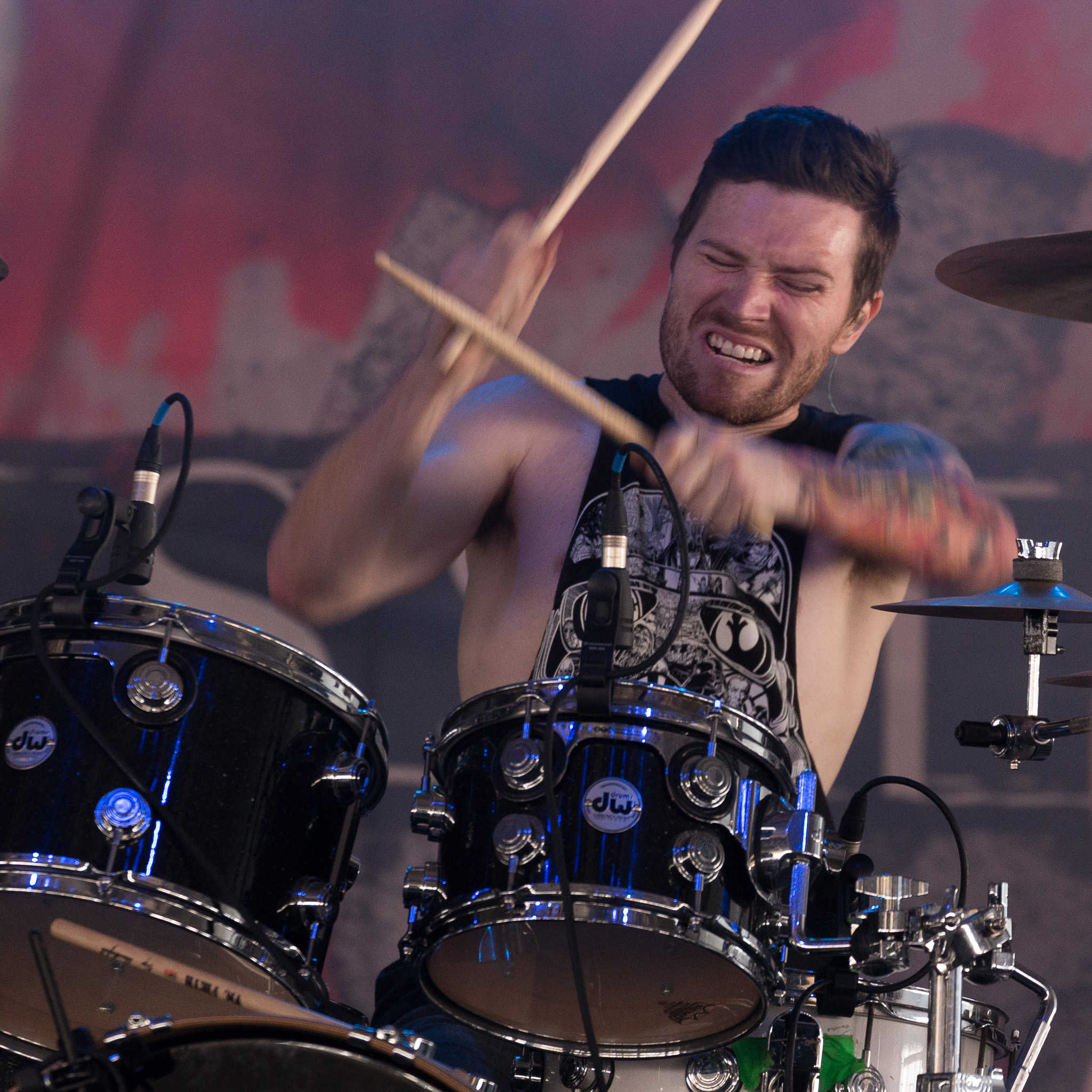
- Traynor in 2014

Background information
- Born: Matthew James Traynor; June 24, 1987 (age 38)
- Origin: Massapequa, New York, U.S.
- Genres: Metalcore; heavy metal; alternative metal; post-grunge; hard rock; screamo; post-hardcore; hardcore punk
- Occupation: Musician
- Instrument: Drums
- Years active: 2002–2018
- Labels: Ferret; Science; Fearless
- Formerly of: Blessthefall

Matthew James Traynor is an American musician that primarily performs metalcore, and best known for being the former drummer of the metalcore band Blessthefall from its formation in 2004 until he left in 2018. He is originally from Massapequa, New York, but moved to Phoenix and eventually helped form Blessthefall.

== Background ==
Traynor has been playing drums since 2000. Traynor started his musical career with bassist Jared Warth and guitarist Mike Frisby in 2002. The trio formed the band and hired vocalist Craig Mabbitt in early 2004. Traynor is one of the only two remaining original members, the other being Warth, after Frisby left the band in 2011. In 2018, Traynor announced his departure from the band.

== Personal life ==
Traynor married fitness blogger and personal trainer Brianna Stevens on March 21, 2015. They announced that Brianna was pregnant with their first born son, later announced to be named Jaxin James Traynor, on February 15, 2017, and would be expecting him around September the same year. Jaxin was born on September 21, 2017. Brianna and Matt would also end up having a girl, Quinn Harper Traynor, on October 3, 2019. As of 2020, Traynor posted himself on Instagram working as a postal worker with United States Postal Service in Scottsdale, Arizona.

== Influences ==
Traynor states that his three biggest influences were Travis Barker of Blink 182, Jordan Mancino of As I Lay Dying, and Matt Greiner of August Burns Red.
