= Yeasayer discography =

- Studio albums: 5
- EPs: 4
- Live albums: 2
- Singles: 18
- Music videos: 11

The discography of Yeasayer, an American experimental rock band, consists of five studio albums, eighteen singles, two live albums and four extended plays (EPs).

Yeasayer's first album All Hour Cymbals was released in 2007 to critical praise. In 2010 the band released the critically acclaimed Odd Blood with the album scoring the group's first chart success around the world. The album produced several world charting singles such as "Ambling Alp", "O.N.E." and "Madder Red". In late 2011 the band started work on their third album Fragrant World. The album was released in the summer of 2012 and gave the band their biggest hit album. Charting in the top 50 in many countries and peaking number 44 on the Billboard 200, the album is the band's highest-charting album in the US to date.

Following the band's third album, Yeasayer started recording for their fourth album Amen & Goodbye. The album was delayed heavily due to a storm that had destroyed much of the recording tapes. It was released in 2016 after a four-year gap between albums, the longest in the band's career. The group's fifth album Erotic Reruns was released on June 7, 2019, and was the first album to release on the band's own imprint label "Yeasayer Records"

== Albums ==
=== Studio albums ===
Title	Album details	Peak chart positions										Sales
Title	Album details	US	AUS	BEL (FL)	IRL	NLD	NOR	SCO	SWE	SWI	UK	Sales
All Hour Cymbals	Released: October 23, 2007; Label: We Are Free; Format: CD, DL, LP	—	—	—	—	—	30	—	—	—	143	US: 55,000
Odd Blood	Released: February 8, 2010; Label: Secretly Canadian; Format: CD, DL, LP	63	66	56	64	43	14	81	47	—	64	US: 80,000
Fragrant World	Released: August 20, 2012; Label: Secretly Canadian; Format: CD, DL, LP	44	47	25	—	67	—	100	—	76	82	
Amen & Goodbye	Released: April 1, 2016; Label: Mute; Format: CD, DL, LP	— (Note: Amen & Goodbye did not enter the US Billboard 200, but peaked at number 15 on the US Vinyl Albums Chart.)	—	66	—	—	—	—	—	86	119	
Erotic Reruns	Released: June 7, 2019; Label: Yeasayer Records; Format: CD, DL, LP	— (Note: Erotic Reruns did not enter the US Billboard 200, but peaked at number 18 on the US Heatseekers Albums Chart.)	—	—	—	—	—	—	—	—	— (Note: Erotic Reruns did not enter the UK Albums Chart, but peaked at number eight on the UK Record Store Chart.)	
"—" denotes album that did not chart or was not released

=== Live albums ===
Title	Album details
Live at Ancienne Belgique, Recorded on October 28th, 2010	Released: 2013-04-23; Label: Secretly Canadian; Formats: DL
Good Evening Washington D.C., Live at 9:30 Club	Released: 2013-11-12; Label: Secretly Canadian; Formats: DL, LP

== Extended plays ==
Title	Album details
2 Meter Session Live In Den Haag	Released: 2010; Label: We Are Free; Formats: CD
I Remember	Released: February 14, 2011; Label: Self released; Formats: DL
End Blood	Released: April 16, 2011; Label: We Are Free; Formats: DL, 7"
Cold Night	Released: October 26, 2016; Label: Mute; Formats: DL

== Singles ==
Title	Year	Peak chart positions								Album
Title	Year	US Sales	US Dance	AUS Hit.	BEL (FL)	MEX Air.	SCO	UK	UK Indie	Album
"Sunrise / 2080"	2007	—	—	—	—	×	—	—	—	All Hour Cymbals
"Wait for the Summer"	2007	—	—	—	—	×	82	— (Note: "Wait for the Summer" did not enter the UK Singles Chart, but peaked at number 78 on the UK Physical Singles Chart Top 100.)	13	All Hour Cymbals
"Ambling Alp"	2009	11	5	7	—	11	—	— (Note: "Ambling Alp" did not enter the UK Singles Chart, but peaked at number 50 on the UK Physical Singles Chart Top 100.)	—	Odd Blood
"O.N.E."	2010	—	—	—	74	9	—	190	—	Odd Blood
"Madder Red"	2010	29	—	—	90	25	—	—	—	Odd Blood
"Henrietta"	2012	—	—	—	—	44	—	—	—	Fragrant World
"Longevity"	2012	—	—	—	—	—	—	—	—	Fragrant World
"Reagan's Skeleton"	2012	—	—	—	—	—	—	—	—	Fragrant World
"I Am Chemistry"	2016	—	—	—	— (Note: "I Am Chemistry" did not enter the Ultratop chart, but entered the Ultratop "extra tips" chart.)	—	—	—	—	Amen & Goodbye
"Prophecy Gun"	2016	—	—	—	—	—	—	—	—	Amen & Goodbye
"Silly Me"	2016	—	—	—	—	—	—	—	—	Amen & Goodbye
"Gerson's Whistle"	2016	—	—	—	—	—	—	—	—	Amen & Goodbye
"I'll Kiss You Tonight"	2019	—	—	—	—	—	—	—	—	Erotic Reruns
"Fluttering in the Floodlights"	2019	—	—	—	—	—	—	—	—	Erotic Reruns
"Let Me Listen in on You"	2019	—	—	—	—	—	—	—	—	Erotic Reruns
"Ecstatic Baby"	2019	—	—	—	—	—	—	—	—	Erotic Reruns
"—" denotes single that did not chart or was not released "×" denotes periods where charts did not exist or were not archived

== Other appearances ==
Year	Song	Album	Notes
2008	"Eat Yourself" (Yeasayer Remix)	Happiness	Remix by the band for the Goldfrapp UK CD single #2 of "Happiness".
2009	"Tightrope"	Dark Was the Night	Red Hot Organization charity compilation.
2010	"Dog Days Are Over" - Yeasayer Remix	Lungs	Remix by the band for Florence and the Machine's "Between Two Lungs" extended version of "Lungs".
2011	"O.N.E."	FIFA 11 Soundtrack	
2011	"Second Hand News"	Rumours Revisited	Fleetwood Mac cover version for the free promotional covers album by Mojo Magazine.
2012	"Overjoyed" (Yeasayer Remix)	Overjoyed	Remix by the band for Bastille's "Overjoyed" single.
2012	"Eyes Wide Open" - Yeasayer Remix	Eyes Wide Open (remixes)	Remix by the band for Gotye's "Eyes Wide Open (remixes)" single.
2012	"The Day" - Yeasayer Remix	Destroyed Remixed	Remix by the band for Moby's "Destroyed (Remixed)" album.
2013	"Rome"	Pitch Perfect: Original Motion Picture Soundtrack	Featured on the "More from Pitch Perfect" extended edition of the soundtrack.
2013	"Closer" - Yeasayer Remix	Closer Remixed	Remix by the band for Tegan and Sara's "Closer" Remixed single.
2013	"Don't Come Close"	The Music of Grand Theft Auto V, Volume 1: Original Music	
2013	"Little Games" - Yeasayer Remix	Inversions	Remix by the band for The Colourist's "Inversion" EP.
2017	"Runaway" - Yeasayer Remix	Runaway (Yeasayer Remix)	Remix by the band for Julietta's "Runaway" (Yeasayer Remix) single.
2018	"Goodpain" (Yeasayer Remix)	Goodpain Remix EP	Remix by the band for Yoke Lore's "Goodpain" Remix EP.

== Music videos ==
Title	Year	Director
"Wait for the Summer"	2007	
"Ambling Alp"	2009	Radical Friend
"O.N.E."	2010	Radical Friend
"Madder Red"	2010	Andreas Nilsson
"Longevity"	2012	Timothy Saccenti
"Longevity" (Director's Cut)	2012	Timothy Saccenti
"Glass of the Microscope"	2013	Ruben van Leer & Jamie Timms
"I Am Chemistry"	2016	New Media Limited
"Silly Me"	2016	New Media Limited
"I'll Kiss You Tonight"	2019	Theodore Sefcik
"Ecstatic Baby"	2019	PandaPanther
