= Phase IV (1974 film) =

1974 American science fiction film directed by Saul Bass

- Theatrical release poster
- Directed by: Saul Bass
- Written by: Mayo Simon
- Produced by: Paul Radin
- Starring: Michael Murphy; Nigel Davenport; Lynne Frederick
- Cinematography: Dick Bush
- Edited by: Willy Kemplen
- Music by: Brian Gascoigne
- Production companies: PBR Productions; Alced Productions
- Distributed by: Paramount Pictures
- Release date: September 1974
- Running time: 84 minutes
- Countries: United Kingdom; United States
- Language: English

Phase IV is a 1974 science fiction horror film directed by graphic designer and filmmaker Saul Bass. It was written by Mayo Simon, who used H. G. Wells's 1905 short story "Empire of the Ants" as inspiration. The film stars Michael Murphy, Nigel Davenport, and Lynne Frederick.

Interiors were shot at Pinewood Studios in England and exterior locations were shot in Kenya, though the film is set in the Arizona desert in the United States. It was produced by Alced Productions and Paramount Pictures.

The film was a box office flop and thus the only feature film directed by Bass. It has since gained a cult following, due to TV airings beginning in 1975 and also being shown on Mystery Science Theater 3000 during the KTMA era.

A novelization of the script, written by Barry N. Malzberg, was published as Phase IV in November 1973.

== Plot ==
After a spectacular and mysterious cosmic event, ants of different species undergo rapid evolution, develop a cross-species hive mind, and build seven strange towers with geometrically perfect designs in the Arizona desert. Except for one family, the local human population flees the strangely acting ants. Scientists James R. Lesko and Ernest D. Hubbs set up a computerized lab in a sealed dome located in an area of significant ant activity in Arizona. The ant colony and the scientific team fight each other, though the ants are the more effective aggressors.

The narrative uses the scientific team as the main protagonists, but there are also ant protagonists going about their duties in the colony. The ants immunize themselves to the humans' chemical weapons and soon infiltrate their lab. Teams of ants penetrate the computers of the lab and short them out. After Lesko decodes an ant message, Kendra Eldridge (a young woman who has taken refuge with the scientists), becomes convinced that her actions have enraged the ants. Seeking to save the two scientists, she abandons the lab and apparently sacrifices herself.

Hubbs and Lesko begin to have different plans for dealing with the ants. While Lesko thinks he can communicate with the ants by means of messages written in mathematics, Hubbs plans to wipe out a hill he believes to be the ants' central hive. Delirious from a venomous ant sting, Hubbs can barely get his boots on, but is determined to attack the hive and kill the ant queen. Instead, Hubbs literally falls into a trap – a deep pit that the ants fill with earth. Helpless to save Hubbs and convinced that the ants will soon move into desert areas where their growth will exceed man's ability to control them, Lesko chooses to follow Hubbs's plan. He sets out to the hive with a canister of insecticide. Descending into the hive, Lesko hunts for the queen, but instead finds Kendra reaching out from under the sand. The two embrace and Lesko realizes that, far from destroying the human race, the ants' plan is to adapt the human race and make them a part of the ants' world. In a voice-over, Lesko states that he and Kendra do not know what plans the ants have, but they are awaiting instructions.

== Cast ==
- Michael Murphy as James R. Lesko
- Nigel Davenport as Dr. Ernest D. Hubbs
- Lynne Frederick as Kendra Eldridge
- Alan Gifford as Mr. Eldridge
- Helen Horton as Mildred Eldridge
- Robert Henderson as Clete
- David Healy as radio announcer (voice, uncredited)

== Production ==
Ken Middleham, the wildlife photographer who shot the insect sequences for Phase IV, also shot the insect sequences for the satire The Hellstrom Chronicle. Both feature extensive use of close-up photography of insects.

Computers used by Lesko were not dummy sets of flashing lights, but real computers, like the GEC 2050.

The idea for Phase IV was apparently hatched over cocktails in 1971, when Peter Bart at Paramount had dinner with Paul Radin and asked him what's cooking. Radin responded an ant story, though he actually had nothing. Radin subsequently called Bass, who had a friend who worked with ants and they quickly agreed to work together.

During production, Saul Bass was concerned with twenty-year-old Lynne Frederick's figure, since she was playing a sixteen-year-old. She was forced to wear a specially designed and painful iron-clad corset to bind her breasts (to make her appear younger) throughout production. Bass also attempted to persuade Frederick to restrict her diet to chicken broth and black coffee.

According to the book Future Tense, "Bass filmed a spectacular, surreal montage lasting four minutes, showing what life would be like on the 'new' Earth, but this was cut by the distributor." The montage was intended to suggest that the two surviving characters were altered by the ants' creation of the next step in evolution for humanity and ants. Shots from the original montage sequence appear in the theatrical trailer, which was likely prepared before the cuts were made to the film.

In early 2012, a faded print of the original ending sequence was found in the Saul Bass Collection at the Academy Film Archive in a preview version of the film, which was originally shown to test audiences in 1973. In June 2012, this excerpt was screened to the public in Los Angeles at the Cinefamily cinematheque following a showing of the theatrical version. The Academy Film Archive was able to find the original film elements for the montage, a set of separation masters, in Paramount Studio's archives. The archive staff recombined the separations, color-timed them for presentation and had them digitally scanned. This recovered montage ending, along with a brand new 35-mm print of the theatrical version, premiered at the Alamo Drafthouse in Austin, Texas, as a part of a full day of films by Saul Bass in December 2012, before being shown at select arthouse theaters in other cities.

The novelization of Mayo Simon's screenplay, written by Barry N. Malzberg, gives a hint of the final version by Bass, as it uses the uncut version of Simon's script.

== Home video ==
The film was released on VHS by Paramount Pictures, the studio that made the movie. A DVD was released by Legend Films in 2008 and a DVD and Blu-ray were released by Olive Films in 2015. All of these releases are bare-bones versions and do not include any special features, such as the original theatrical trailer or the scenes cut from the original version of the film.

The long-rumored alternate ending of the film remained out of distribution until rediscovered and restored by the Academy of Motion Picture Arts and Sciences' Academy Film Archive. It is now available on iTunes Extras in celebration of the 45th anniversary of the film. In 2020, U.K. video label 101 Films released Phase IV in a two-disc limited edition Blu-ray set that includes the restored original ending as an extra, along with several short films directed by Bass.

In 2024, U.S. video label Vinegar Syndrome released the film in a three-disc 4K/Blu-ray combo set which includes the theatrical version on the 4K disc and the first Blu-ray disc, with the second Blu-ray Disc containing a reconstruction of the original preview version with the full ending montage restored along with several other reinstated bits throughout the film. A making-of documentary, a commentary track with film historian Matthew Asprey Gear and an interview with composer Brian Gascoigne are included as bonus features.

== Soundtrack ==
Brian Gascoigne was the chief composer and Stomu Yamashta was responsible for the music in the final montage sequence, which was cut from the theatrical release. David Vorhaus and Desmond Briscoe composed the electronic music. Waxwork Records released the soundtrack on vinyl in March 2015. It does not include the cut final sequence montage music by Stomu Yamashta. It was the first release of the soundtrack in any format.

== Reception ==
Upon its initial theatrical release, the film had mixed reviews. In a generally positive review, Jay Cocks of Time saw the film as "good, eerie entertainment, with interludes of such haunted visual intensity that it becomes, at its best, a nightmare incarnate". In a negative review, Variety wrote that this ecological monster film "didn't get the bugs worked out before release". Time Out London wrote that the special effects take priority over the ideas. A. H. Weiler of The New York Times wrote, "For all of its good, scientific and human intentions, 'Phase IV' cries for a Phase V of fuller explanations."

The review aggregation website Rotten Tomatoes gave the film 53% based on 19 reviews with an average rating of 5.7/10. Ignatiy Vishnevetsky of The A.V. Club described it as "designed more than directed, and edited around principles of color and line, rather than around performance or plot". Bill Gibron of PopMatters rated it 7/10 stars and wrote that "for every hackneyed hole-punch moment there's an engaging scope enhanced by the film's visual wonders". David Cornelius of DVD Talk rated it 4.5/5 stars and wrote, "Watch it late at night with the lights out, and you'll get plenty freaked."

Phase IV won the 1975 Grand Prix Award at the International Festival of Science Fiction Films in Trieste, Italy.

== Legacy ==
This is the first film to depict a geometric crop circle, in this case, created by super-intelligent ants. The film predates by two years the first modern reports of crop circles in the United Kingdom and it has been cited as a possible inspiration or influence on the pranksters who started this phenomenon.

Over time, the film has gained a cult following. The film has been a significant influence on a recent generation of science fiction film directors and other visual media artists. In Nicolas Goldbart's science fiction film Phase 7, Phase IV is playing on a television in the apartment of the protagonists. The writer/director Panos Cosmatos described Phase IV as having been a very significant influence on the look and feel of his science fiction film Beyond the Black Rainbow.

The film was also the inspiration for Ant Attack, a 1983 game released for the ZX Spectrum by Quicksilva, where the protagonist has to rescue a trapped character in a 3D-isometric city ruled by giant ants.

The music video by Radical Friend for Yeasayer's 2009 song "Ambling Alp" is an homage to Phase IV and the video's images are inspired by some of the visual elements of the film.

In January 1989, Phase IV was featured on one of the very early episodes of Mystery Science Theater 3000.

== See also ==
- Barry N. Malzberg bibliography
- The Hellstrom Chronicle
- Hellstrom's Hive
- Watership Down
- The Plague Dogs
- The Adventures of Chatran
- List of American films of 1974
- List of British films of 1974
