= Cruel Intentions (Simian Mobile Disco song) =

Single by Simian Mobile Disco

from the album Temporary Pleasure
- Released: 4 January 2010
- Recorded: 2009
- Genre: Electro
- Label: Wichita Recordings
- Songwriter(s): Jas Shaw; James Ford; Beth Ditto
- Producer(s): Jas Shaw; James Ford

Simian Mobile Disco singles chronology
"Audacity of Huge" (2009)	"Cruel Intentions" (2010)	"Delicacies" (2010)

"Cruel Intentions" is a song by English electronic music duo Simian Mobile Disco, released as the second single from their second studio album, Temporary Pleasure (2009). It was co-written by Beth Ditto, who also sings on the track.

== Music video ==
The video for "Cruel Intentions" was directed by Saam Farahmand and was originally released on 25 November 2009. It is a shorter version of the short film "Study After Cruel Intentions" featuring Sharon Maughan, Lysette Anthony, Pooky Quesnel, Joanna Fussey, and Charlotte Weston. The longer version of the film is 20 minutes. Simian Mobile Disco's James Ford explained to NME that the video was difficult to produce because it was considered too unconventional due to its length. "We had quite a lot of opposition to it because it doesn't really work with a traditional music format," he said. "It's useless as a marketing tool in that respect. We wanted to do something that stood up in its own right. It wasn't another pointless video."

== Critical reception ==
Dan Weiss of Pitchfork Media complimented Ditto's vocals, saying: "Here she out-lungs her mostly anonymous competition, and SMD percolate behind her with such spring I keep waiting for Los Del Rio to spit game." Digital Spy's David Balls wrote that the song "isn't massively original, but if you need something to help you work off those last few mince pies (and roast potatoes, and pigs-in-blankets...), this is a cool, classy option."

== Track listing ==
- 12″ single 1
1. "Cruel Intentions" (DJ Pierre dub) – 8:00
2. "Cruel Intentions" (Space Cave 12″ mix) – 7:06
- 12″ single 2
1. "Cruel Intentions" (Greg Wilson re-edit) – 6:38
2. "Cruel Intentions" (Maurice Fulton remix) – 6:15
- Digital download
1. "Cruel Intentions" (single version) – 3:04
2. "Cruel Intentions" (single version instrumental) – 3:02
3. "Cruel Intentions" (Joker dub) – 4:10
4. "Cruel Intentions" (Joker remix) – 4:12
5. "Cruel Intentions" (Greg Wilson re-edit) – 7:44
6. "Cruel Intentions" (Heartbreak's Slow Action remix) – 9:31
7. "Cruel Intentions" (Heartbreak's Minimal dub) – 3:28
8. "Cruel Intentions" (Maurice Fulton remix) – 6:15
9. "Cruel Intentions" (DJ Pierre remix) – 8:00
10. "Cruel Intentions" (DJ Pierre dub) – 8:01
11. "Cruel Intentions" (Space Cave 12″ dub) – 7:06
12. "Cruel Intentions" (Space Cave 12″ mix) – 7:05
13. "Cruel Intentions" (Space Cave 12″ instrumental) – 7:05

== Charts ==
Chart performance for "Cruel Intentions"
Chart (2009)	Peak position
UK Singles (OCC)	142
