= I Am Chemistry =

Single by Yeasayer

from the album Amen & Goodbye
- Released: January 7, 2016
- Recorded: 2015
- Genre: Psychedelic rock; synthpop; experimental
- Length: 5:01
- Label: Mute
- Songwriter(s): Chris Keating; Anand Wilder; Ira Wolf Tuton
- Producer(s): Yeasayer

Yeasayer singles chronology
"Reagan's Skeleton" (2012)	"I Am Chemistry" (2016)	"Prophecy Gun" (2016)

"I Am Chemistry" is a song by American experimental rock band Yeasayer. It was released as the leading single from the band's fourth studio album Amen & Goodbye under Mute Records on January 7, 2016.

The lyrics of the song reference a number of poisons, including digoxin, VX, NaCN, DDT, sarin, mustard gas, rue, oleander and Quaker buttons (strychnine).

The song's bridge is performed by Suzzy Roche of The Roches.

== Background ==
The song was recorded during Yeasayer's four-year break from 2012 to 2016. The song is a neo-psychedelic song that has numerous changes throughout. The song is 5 minutes in length, and was written by Chris Keating, Anand Wilder, and Ira Wolf Tuton. It was released on January 7, 2016 as the leading single for the album, and it was released to YouTube and streaming platforms, like Spotify.

The cover art was created by sculptor David Altmejd, who also created the artwork for the album.
