= Sample and hold (disambiguation) =

In electronics, a sample and hold circuit samples a continuously varying analog signal and holds its value at a constant level for a specified period.

Sample and hold may also refer to:

- "Sample and Hold", a song by Neil Young from the album Trans
- "Sample and Hold", a song by Bill Bruford from the album Feels Good to Me
- Sample and Hold, a remix album by Simian Mobile Disco
