= End Blood =

EP by Yeasayer
- Released: April 16, 2011
- Genre: Experimental rock, neo-psychedelia
- Length: 8.52
- Label: We Are Free
- Producer: Yeasayer

Yeasayer chronology
| Odd Blood (2010) | End Blood (2011) | Fragrant World (2012) |

End Blood is a two-track EP by Brooklyn-based experimental rock group Yeasayer. It was released by the record label We Are Free on 16 April 2011 for Record Store Day on an exclusive 7" vinyl format, and subsequently released digitally on 3 May 2011. The two songs were tracks that did not fit the album Odd Blood.

== Track listing ==
| No. | Title | Length |
|---|---|---|
| 1. | "Swallowing the Decibels" | 4:51 |
| 2. | "Phoenix Wind" | 4:01 |
