= Amen & Goodbye =

Studio album by Yeasayer
- Released: April 1, 2016
- Studio: Outlier Inn (Woodridge, New York)
- Length: 39:26
- Label: Mute

Yeasayer chronology
Fragrant World (2012)	Amen & Goodbye (2016)	Erotic Reruns (2019)

Singles from Amen & Goodbye
- 1. "I Am Chemistry" Released: January 7, 2016; 2. "Prophecy Gun" Released: February 10, 2016; 3. "Silly Me" Released: March 2, 2016; 4. "Gerson's Whistle" Released: March 25, 2016

Amen & Goodbye is the fourth studio album by American experimental rock band Yeasayer, released on April 1, 2016 on Mute.

== Background and recording ==
For the first time, the band recorded live outside in wilderness located in upstate New York. The recording process for Amen & Goodbye took four years — longer than for any of the band's previous albums — which was exacerbated by damage to their tapes caused by a rainstorm.

== Artwork ==
The cover art was created by sculptor David Altmejd, and was described by the band as, "Sgt Pepper meets Hieronymous Bosch meets Dalí meets PeeWee's Playhouse."

== Critical reception ==
The album was described by Transverso Media as, "Yeasayer’s most heterogeneous body of work, both in terms of the patchwork of its sonic and textural peaks and valleys but also its blending of classic motifs with newly formed bizzarities in a way that never feels heavy handed or campy," stating, "they don’t just reconcile the worldbeat freak rock of All Hour Cymbals, psychedelic pop of Odd Blood, and brooding, dark electronica of Fragrant World, but manage to transcend time and space itself with a mélange of biblical allusions, futuristic sound, and countless other seemingly disparate stylistic and thematic juxtapositions."

== Track listing ==
No.	Title	Length
1.	"Daughters of Cain"	1:53
2.	"I Am Chemistry"	5:01
3.	"Silly Me"	3:22
4.	"Half Asleep"	4:17
5.	"Dead Sea Scrolls"	3:25
6.	"Prophecy Gun"	3:59
7.	"Computer Canticle 1"	0:28
8.	"Divine Simulacrum"	2:55
9.	"Child Prodigy"	0:59
10.	"Gerson's Whistle"	5:06
11.	"Uma"	3:13
12.	"Cold Night"	4:13
13.	"Amen & Goodbye"	0:35
Total length:		39:26

== Charts ==
Chart (2016)	Peak position
Belgian Albums (Ultratop Flanders)	66
Swiss Albums (Schweizer Hitparade)	86
UK Albums (OCC)	119
UK Independent Albums (OCC)	26
US Top Alternative Albums (Billboard)	22
US Independent Albums (Billboard)	22
US Top Rock Albums (Billboard)	35
