= A Form of Change =

A Form of Change EP

EP by Simian Mobile Disco
- Released: 2 October 2012
- Genre: Electronic
- Label: Wichita
- Producers: James Ford, Jas Shaw

Simian Mobile Disco chronology
Unpatterns (2012)	A Form of Change EP (2012)	Whorl (2014)

A Form of Change is the fourth EP by English electronic music duo Simian Mobile Disco. It was released on 2 October 2012 by Wichita Recordings.

== History ==
The four tracks were taken from their Unpatterns recording sessions. Jas Shaw (in an interview with 7digital), on the behalf of Simian Mobile Disco, said that "they were nearly all goers for the album, but we took them off because we felt it made the whole record too long, and messed with the pacing of it." The track "Everyday" is also an iTunes bonus track on Unpatterns.

== Track listing ==
No.	Title	Length
1.	"A Form of Change"	6:50
2.	"Unfixed"	5:40
3.	"Breaking Time"	6:31
4.	"Everyday"	5:34
