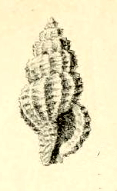
- Original image of a shell of Raphitoma bracteata

Scientific classification
- Kingdom: Animalia
- Phylum: Mollusca
- Class: Gastropoda
- Subclass: Caenogastropoda
- Order: Neogastropoda
- Superfamily: Conoidea
- Family: Raphitomidae
- Genus: Raphitoma
- Species: R. bracteata

Binomial name
- Raphitoma bracteata (Pallary, 1904)

Synonyms
- Homotoma bracteata Pallary, 1904 (original combination); Philbertia bracteata (Pallary, 1904); Raphitoma (Cyrtoides) bracteata Nordsieck, 1968

= Raphitoma bracteata =

Species of mollusc

Raphitoma bracteata is a species of sea snail, a marine gastropod mollusk in the family Raphitomidae.

== Description ==
The shell reaches a length of 13 mm, and a diameter of 6 mm.

The subfusiform, turreted, white shell has a pointed spire. It contains 6 whorls, of which only 1½ whorl in the protoconch. The subsequent whorls are convex with axial, close and elevated ribs and elevated, decurrent, parallel threads, forming nodules on the cross-points. The suture is impressed. The body whorl is ventrose. The subovate aperture measures half the length of the shell. The columella is slightly twisted at its base. The open siphonal canal is very short. The outer lip is rounded, very convex, incrassate inwards and ending in a V-shape sinus at its top.

== Distribution ==
The holotype of this marine species was found off Tunisia.
