= Welcome to Sideways =

Studio album by Simian Mobile Disco
- Released: 11 November 2016
- Recorded: Jas Shaw's Kent Studio
- Genre: Electronic
- Length: 63:46
- Label: Delicacies
- Producer: Simian Mobile Disco

Simian Mobile Disco chronology
Whorl (2014)	Welcome to Sideways (2016)	Murmurations (2018)

Singles from Welcome to Sideways
- 1. "Staring at All This Handle" Released: 27 May 2016; 2. "Remember in Reverse" Released: 15 July 2016; 3. "Far Away from a Distance" Released: 30 September 2016

Welcome to Sideways is the fifth studio album by British electronic music duo Simian Mobile Disco, released on 11 November 2016.

== Recording ==
After touring wrapped up for their previous album Whorl, the duo took a short hiatus in 2015. James Ford produced albums for Foals, Mumford & Sons, Florence & the Machine, the Last Shadow Puppets and Depeche Mode, while Jas Shaw built a new studio at his home in Kent and released a series of solo EPs born out of experiments in the studio. Shaw also continued DJing, "playing with more austere techno artists than we were with before".

Ford and Shaw reconvened in early 2016 to work on new material, and announced a series of singles on their Delicacies label soon after. Initially the plan was to release four club-focused singles, totalling eight new tracks, though this was slightly revised following the completion of the album. Unlike previous Delicacies singles, the new material sees the band abandoning the tradition of naming their traditional techno tracks after exotic cuisine, "for the simple reason that we've pretty much run out of weird and wonderful food stuffs to steal names from. Instead, a semi-random automated process has been used to create the track names". In an interview with Lauren Laverne, the duo said they picked track titles primarily on how much they made them laugh, a continuation of lighthearted humour that has been a part of their act from the beginning. Laverne compared their naming process to William S. Burroughs' cut-up technique.

The band set out on a DJ tour to support the new singles. In September, Shaw hinted at a new album during an appearance on George FitzGerald's BBC Radio 1 show, while premiering the Lena Willikens remix of "Far Away from a Distance". Soon after the band posted an hour-long mix on their SoundCloud account made up of tracks they were playing during their summer tour, which included four new SMD tracks. A week later they announced their fifth album, Welcome To Sideways. The nine-track album, like Delicacies from 2010, comes with a bonus mixed version which includes extra tracks and remixes.

All the tracks were created with the club in mind, in contrast to the experimental style found on Whorl. Ford explained the concept and title in a statement: "We realize that from an outsider point of view, it can seem like we change quite radically with every album we do but from our point of view it always feels like a smooth transition. Hopefully people who have stuck with us this long, and appreciate the fact that we aren’t trying to repeat ourselves with every album, will enjoy another slight turn sideways."

Shaw further elaborated on the ideas behind the album in a career retrospective for Thump: "It's club music. Right now, I feel it's really great how quite functional techno and noise––the kind of stuff I would have played in a bar in 2006 just to annoy people––seems to be this fruitful area of music that is really adventurous and is challenging the idea of what music can be. The appeal of all those noise guys is that, you don't go there because it's going to press all of your pleasure buttons, you go there because you get this hypnotic sensation from texture. It works at Berghain, but also at a church in London, or at the Jazz Cafe."

Along with the nine tracks that make up the album, thus far four other tracks from the sessions have also been released. "Sky on the Floor" and "Soft Attack" were released as B-sides, "Laughing in the Face of Block" was released as a non-album single in October, and "Balloon Takes a Holiday" was contributed to Fabric's #savefabric compilation. Edited versions of "Sky on the Floor", "Soft Attack" and "Laughing in the Face of Block" appear on the album's mixed version.

== Cover ==
The album cover is taken from Jack Featherstone's video for the album's lead single "Staring at All This Handle".

== Reception ==
The album has a score of 73 on Metacritic based on 8 reviews, citing generally favourable reviews.

== Track listing ==
Disc one: Unmixed
No.	Title	Length
1.	"Happening Distractions"	6:42
2.	"Far Away from a Distance"	6:02
3.	"Bubble Has No Answers"	7:01
4.	"Staring at All This Handle"	6:37
5.	"Face to Face with Spoon"	7:57
6.	"Space Is Filled with Ringing"	7:18
7.	"Remember in Reverse"	8:48
8.	"Flying or Falling"	5:58
9.	"Drone Follows Me Everywhere"	7:29

Disc two: Mixed
No.	Title	Length
1.	"Welcome to Sideways (A Delicacies Mix)"; 1. "Bubble Has No Answers"; 2. "Laughing in the Face of Block" (Matrixxman's LSD Rework); 3. "Far Away from a Distance"; 4. "Space Is Filled with Ringing"; 5. "Sky on the Floor" (Dub); 6. "Flying or Falling"; 7. "Soft Attack" (Drum Version); 8. "Face to Face with Spoon"; 9. "Staring at All This Handle" (Perc Remix); 10. "Remember in Reverse"; 11. "Drone Follows Me Everywhere"	52:29
