= Live in Japan (Simian Mobile Disco album) =

Live album by Simian Mobile Disco
- Released: 21 May 2008 (Japan)
- Recorded: 21 November 2007
- Genre: Electronica
- Length: 42:35
- Label: Wichita; Hostess
- Producer: Jas Shaw; James Ford

Simian Mobile Disco chronology
Clock EP (2008)	Live in Japan (2008)	Sample and Hold (2008)

Live in Japan is a live album by English electronic music duo Simian Mobile Disco. It was released on 21 May 2008, on Wichita Recordings and Hostess Records in Japan.

Although the album is made one only track, the track listing given inside the CD case shows only Simian Mobile Disco tracks, except for Ladyflash which was originally composed by the Go! Team and remixed by Simian Mobile Disco for the single release of the track and live purposes.

== Track listing ==
1. "Sleep Deprivation"
2. "Animal House"
3. "Ladyflash" (Simian Mobile Disco's remix of the Go! Team song)
4. "It's the Beat"
5. "System"
6. "Hustler"
7. "Tits and Acid"
8. "Scott"
