= O.N.E. (song) =

Single by Yeasayer

from the album Odd Blood
- B-side: Demo version; instrumental
- Released: March 23, 2010
- Recorded: 2009
- Genre: Neo-psychedelia; synth-pop; worldbeat; alternative dance
- Length: 5:23 (Album version); 3:30 (Video edit)
- Label: Secretly Canadian; Mute
- Songwriter(s): Chris Keating; Anand Wilder
- Producer(s): Yeasayer

Yeasayer singles chronology
"Ambling Alp" (2009)	"O.N.E." (2010)	"Madder Red" (2010)

Music video
- "O.N.E." on YouTube

"O.N.E." is a song by American experimental rock band Yeasayer. It was released as the second official single from the band's second studio album Odd Blood under Secretly Canadian in the United States and Mute Records in the United Kingdom on March 23, 2010. The song has peaked at number 24 on the Belgian Ultratop Flanders single chart and at number 190 on the UK Singles Chart. It has been included in the in-game soundtracks for Grand Theft Auto V, FIFA 11, and NBA Baller Beats and was featured in 'Poisoned Pill' a season 2 episode of The Good Wife.

== Music video ==
The official music video for the song, lasting four minutes and six seconds, was uploaded to YouTube on March 9, 2010 and was directed by Radical Friend. The video features a shorter edit of the song, lasting three minutes and thirty seconds, compared to the album version which lasts five minutes and twenty-three seconds.

== Reception ==
Pitchfork Media listed "O.N.E." as the 28th best song of 2010, stating that "It's always satisfying when a band gets everything right, and "O.N.E." is the sound of Yeasayer hitting all its marks." NME placed "O.N.E" at number 90 on its list of "150 Best Tracks of the Past 15 Years". On 26 January 2011, "O.N.E." was voted #30 on the Triple J Hottest 100, 2010.

== Track listing ==
=== 12" vinyl ===
- SC213 / 12MUTE435

Side A
No.	Title	Length
1.	"O.N.E."	5:23
2.	"O.N.E." (XXXChange Remix)	4:45

Side B
No.	Title	Length
1.	"O.N.E." (Demo Version)	5:57
2.	"O.N.E." (Instrumental)	5:23

=== Digital download ===
No.	Title	Length
1.	"O.N.E."	5:23
2.	"O.N.E." (XXXChange Remix)	4:45
3.	"O.N.E." (Demo Version)	5:57
4.	"O.N.E." (Instrumental)	5:23

== Charts ==
Chart (2010)	Peak position
Belgium (Ultratip Bubbling Under Flanders)	74
UK Singles (OCC)	190

== Release history ==
Region	Date	Label	Format	Catalogue no.
Worldwide	March 23, 2010	Secretly Canadian	Digital download	—
United States	April 17, 2010	Secretly Canadian	12"	SC213
United Kingdom	April 17, 2010	Mute	12"	12MUTE435
