= FabricLive.43 =

FabricLive.43: Get Familiar

Compilation album by Switch & Sinden
- Released: December 2008
- Genre: Electronica
- Label: Fabric
- Producer: Switch & Sinden

FabricLive chronology
FabricLive.42 (2009)	FabricLive.43 (2009)	FabricLive.44 (2009)

FabricLive.43 is a 2008 album by Switch & Sinden. The album was released as part of the FabricLive Mix Series.

== Track listing ==
1. Juiceboxxx & Dre Skull - Center Stage - Vicious Pop Records
2. Yo Majesty - Club Action - Domino
3. Aquasky ft. Acafool - Have a Good Time (The Count & Sinden Remix) - Passenger
4. Armand Van Helden - This aint Hollywood - Southern Fried
5. Scottie B And King Tutt - African Chant - Unruly
6. Mujava - Township Funk (Sinden Remix) - This Is Music
7. Tigerstyle ft. Vybz Kartel, Mangi Mahal & Nikitta - Balle! Shava! (Sinden Remix) - Nachural
8. MixHell - Highly Explicit (Brodinski Remix) - Boysnoize Records
9. Buraka Som Sistema - Luanda Lisboa - Fabric Records
10. Radioclit - Secousse (Instrumental Version) - Mental Groove
11. 2 Tracks Mixed:
  1. Alan Braxe ft. Killa Kella & Fallon - Nightwatcher (Show Me) (Instrumental) - Eye Industries
  2. Double S & True Tiger - From Day - True Tiger/Always
12. Joker - Gully Brook Lane - TerrorRhythm
13. JME - AWOH - Boy Better Know
14. Skream - Fick - Tempa
15. Zomby - Strange Fruit - Ramp
16. Caper - Hybrid - Studio Rocker
17. Project Bassline - Drop The Pressure (The Count & Sinden Remix) - Cheap Thrills
18. Piddy Py - Giggle Riddim - Dress to Sweat
19. Róisín Murphy - Overpowered (Herve & Róisín in the Secret Garden Mix) - EMI
20. Machines Don't Care - Beat Bang - Machines Don't Care
21. Kudu - Let's Finish (Sinden Remix) - Nublu
22. M83 - Couleurs - Gooom Disques
23. SALEM - Redlights - Acephale Records
