= Hustler (song) =

Simian Mobile Disco song

Single by Simian Mobile Disco

from the album Attack Decay Sustain Release
- Released: 23 May 2006
- Recorded: 2006
- Label: Wichita
- Songwriter(s): Jas Shaw; James Ford; Char Johnson
- Producer(s): Jas Shaw; James Ford

Simian Mobile Disco singles chronology
"The Count" (2005)	"Hustler" (2006)	"Tits & Acid / Animal House" (2006)

"Hustler" is a song by English electronic music duo Simian Mobile Disco, released a single from their debut studio album Attack Decay Sustain Release. It features Char Johnson on lead vocals. It was featured in DJ Hero 2 as part of the "Electro Hits" DLC pack, mixed with "Pump Up the Jam" by Technotronic.

== Music video ==
The video for "Hustler" depicts numerous girls sitting in a circle playing chinese whispers before devolving into kissing each other in succession.

== Track listing ==
- 12″ single
1. "Hustler" (Armand van Helden remix) – 5:41
2. "Hustler" (extended club mix) – 6:36
- Digital download
1. "Hustler" 3:42
2. "Hustler" (Armand van Helden remix) – 5:41
3. "Hustler" (A-Trak remix) – 5:37
4. "Hustler" (extended club mix) – 6:36
5. "Hustler" (Jesse Rose remix) – 6:08
