= Audacity of Huge =

2009 single by Simian Mobile Disco

"Audacity of Huge" is a song by English electronic music duo Simian Mobile Disco, released in 2009 as the first single from their second studio album Temporary Pleasure. It features vocals by Chris Keating of Yeasayer. The music video was directed by Aries Moross.

The Guardian has described the song as the "lament (of) an uber-materialist". Its title is an allusion to Barack Obama's The Audacity of Hope.

== Reception ==
At Pitchfork, Marc Hogan called it "a limber, name-dropping, ear-catching body-mover, sleek and uncluttered and populist". Consequence of Sound stated that the lyrics were "hopelessly catchy non sequiturs", while NME felt that they were the only thing that made the song "listenable" (instead of "as annoying as stubbing your toe"). The Quietus praised it as "amusingly bizarre" and "a pitch-perfect satire of the bling-bejewelled breast-beating so prevalent on 808s and Heartbreaks".

== Charts ==
Chart performance for "Audacity of Huge"
Chart (2009)	Peak position
Australia (ARIA)	81
Belgium (Ultratip Bubbling Under Flanders)	6
UK Singles (OCC)	60
