= Simian Mobile Disco =

English electronic music duo

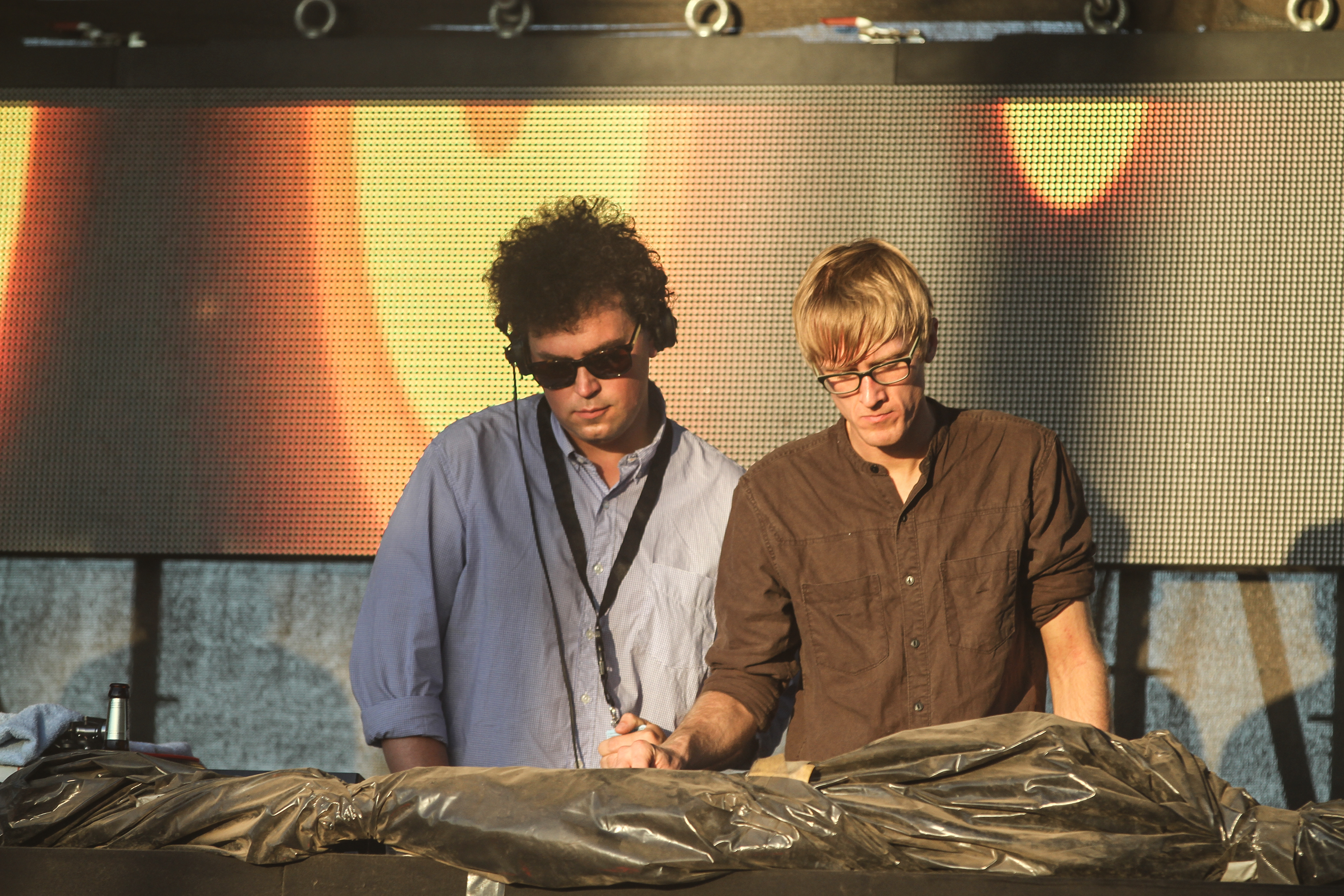
- Simian Mobile Disco performing at Melt! Festival 2013

Background information
- Origin: London, England
- Genres: Electronic; house; tech house; electro house; nu-disco
- Years active: 2003–present (on hiatus since 2018)
- Labels: Kitsuné; Wichita; Anti-; Delicacies
- Spinoff of: Simian
- Members: James Ford; Jas Shaw
- Website: simianmobiledisco.co.uk

Simian Mobile Disco are an English electronic music duo and production team, formed in 2003 by James Ford and Jas Shaw of the band Simian. Musically, they are known for their analogue production. Ford is also known for his production work.

== History ==
=== Early history ===
Simian Mobile Disco originally formed as a DJ duo, on the side of their early four-piece band Simian, with their name being a nod to Silver Apples founder Simeon Coxe III. They released a number of early tastemaker singles, such as "The Mighty Atom / Boatrace / Upside Down" on I'm a Cliché and "The Count", on Kitsuné, but gained more fame for their remixes of artists such as Muse, Klaxons, the Go! Team, Air and others. In 2006, Kitsuné released the duo's underground hit "Hustler", which features guest vocals from New York singer Char Johnson.

=== 2007: Attack Decay Sustain Release ===
The band's debut album, Attack Decay Sustain Release was released on 18 June 2007 on Wichita Recordings. Among the tracks included on it are "Sleep Deprivation", "Hustler", "Tits and Acid", "I Believe", "Hot Dog" and lead single "It's the Beat", which features Ninja from UK indie band the Go! Team on vocals. The album contains five new tracks, and the European version includes a bonus disc. The album was preceded by mix compilations in April for the "Bugged Out" series.

SMD supported Klaxons at the Brixton Academy on 5 December 2007, The Chemical Brothers at the Birmingham National Indoor Arena on 7 December 2007, at Aintree Pavilion on 9 December 2007 and Brighton Centre on 12 December 2007. SMD made a mix for Mixmag that came free with the January 2008 issue of Mixmag.

=== 2008–2009: Temporary Pleasure ===
While working on their second studio album, they released a collection of remixed SMD originals entitled Sample and Hold, which contains eleven tracks and was released in the UK on 28 July 2008.

In January 2009, they announced on their Myspace page that a new album would be released in 2009. They released a new track, "Synthesise", on 12 February, through a music video (directed by Aries Moross and Alex Sushon) that "features live visual accompaniment" for the track. Two days later, a new song was broadcast on BBC Radio 1 named "10,000 Horses Can't Be Wrong", soon followed by the release on 6 March of the official music video on their YouTube channel.

Their second studio album Temporary Pleasure was finally announced on 6 May, featuring many guests including Gruff Rhys of Super Furry Animals, Alexis Taylor of Hot Chip, Beth Ditto of Gossip, and Chris Keating of Yeasayer.

On New Year's Eve 2009 Simian Mobile Disco headlined "Get Loaded in the Dark" at the Brixton Academy, alongside Annie Mac (BBC Radio 1), Chase & Status, Herve and Sub Focus.

=== 2010–2011: Delicatessen and Delicacies ===
During the introduction of their Essential Mix made for Radio 1, broadcast on 9 January 2010, they gave hints on what would be a "techno-based album" expected for later in 2010. Since then, the duo has also established what will be a quarterly residency to JDH and Dave P's Fixed nights, in NYC.

In March 2010 the duo announced their new club-night project, Delicatessen, curated by the duo and accompanied by what they say to be "a brand new imprint" titled Delicacies. The first single on Delicacies was set to be released in late May, both physically and then digitally. The first two tracks are entitled "Aspic" and "Nerve Salad". Simian Mobile Disco announced that every track will "take the name of an exotic, and often bizarre, delicacy from around the world".

Simian Mobile Disco played the Together Winter Music Festival at the Alexandra Palace in London on 26 November 2011.

=== 2012–2013: Unpatterns ===
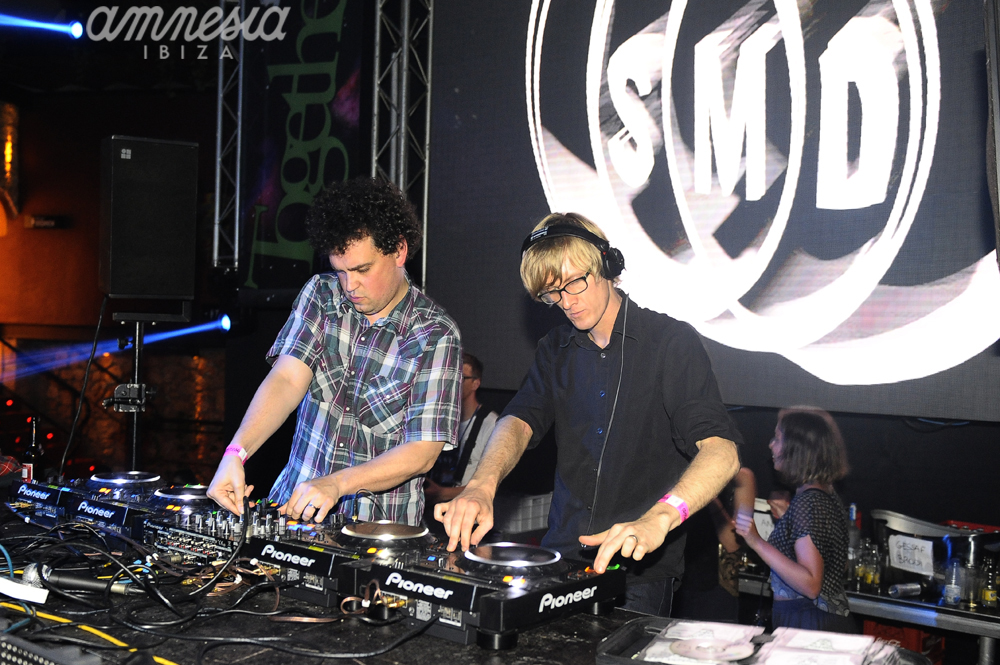
Simian Mobile Disco at Amnesia, 2012

In February 2012, Simian Mobile Disco announced the follow-up to Delicacies, Unpatterns, which was released on 14 May 2012. "Seraphim" was released as the album's lead single on 9 April. On 2 October 2012 they released their fourth EP A Form of Change, whose four tracks included on the release were taken from Unpatterns recording sessions.

=== 2014–2015: Whorl ===
In March 2014, it was announced that on 26 April 2014, Simian Mobile Disco would be recording for a new album, Whorl, at an intimate show in Pioneertown, CA (near the Joshua Tree National Park). The two band members performed using only one synthesizer and one sequencer each. The recorded tracks were then polished in their studio for the eventual album release.

=== 2016–2017: Welcome to Sideways ===
After wrapping touring and support for Whorl, the duo took a short hiatus in 2015. Ford produced albums for Florence and the Machine, Mumford & Sons, Foals and the Last Shadow Puppets, while Shaw built a new studio and released a series of solo EPs. The duo announced in 2016 that they would release four singles, totalling eight new tracks, during the year born out of jam sessions in the new studio. As of July, two of these singles have been released. The singles see the duo abandoning the tradition of naming their traditional techno tracks after exotic cuisine, "for the simple reason that we've pretty much run out of weird and wonderful food stuffs to steal names from. Instead, a semi-random automated process has been used to create the track names". In September, a new album Welcome to Sideways was announced for release in November 2016. The nine-track album, featuring "Staring at All This Handle" and "Remember in Reverse", along with seven brand new tracks, will come with a bonus mixed version. Like their previous Delicacies album from 2010, the tracks are more club-focused than the experimental style found on Whorl. Ford commented: "We realize that from an outsider point of view, it can seem like we change quite radically with every album we do but from our point of view it always feels like a smooth transition. Hopefully people who have stuck with us this long, and appreciate the fact that we aren’t trying to repeat ourselves with every album, will enjoy another slight turn sideways."

The album was promoted with a series of live shows and an appearance on BBC Radio 1's Essential Mix in early 2017. Towards the end of the year the duo began a monthly residency on NTS Radio.

In December 2017, Simian Mobile Disco signed a music publishing deal with Warner/Chappell Music; the duo were formerly signed to Kobalt Music Group.

=== 2018: Murmurations ===
The duo's sixth album Murmurations was announced in February 2018 for release in May, alongside the premiere of its first single "Caught in a Wave". It is their first album since 2013's Live to be released on Wichita Recordings. The album was recorded in collaboration with the Deep Throat Choir, who were to join the band for the initial tour dates. In a statement announcing the album, Shaw comments: "Listening to them moving their voices around a tone, altering the timbre, making chords, was like working with an incredible new synthesiser." Bulgarian choir music, Cocteau Twins, Iannis Xenakis and Pauline Oliveros are noted as influences for the album.

A tour planned for the album in June was cancelled after Shaw was diagnosed with AL amyloidosis. The group's Facebook stated that touring would be "put on hold for at least a few months" for Shaw's treatment. A planned performance in London went ahead with the proceeds going to amyloidosis research. The show was released as a live album on Bandcamp during the summer.

=== 2018–present: Hiatus and solo projects ===
The duo have been on a 'temporary hiatus' since the Murmurations performance.

Ford continued work as a producer on releases by Foals, Jessie Ware, Friendly Fires, Shame and Gorillaz.

In September 2018, an album of remixes by Shaw based on the Murmurations album was released. This was followed by On Reflection, the debut album by Selling – a collaboration between Shaw and Gold Panda.

In April 2019, Shaw announced a solo album, The Exquisite Cops, to be released in September following a series of fortnightly singles. In 2020, Shaw and Bas Grossfeldt released Klavier, an album based on samples of a Yamaha Disklavier. A new series of Shaw solo EPs created during COVID-19 lockdown, titled Sollbruchstelle, was released throughout 2021.

Ford's debut solo album, The Hum, was released on May 12, 2023.

== Members ==
In addition to his work with Simian Mobile Disco, Ford is a producer and has worked with artists such as Florence and the Machine, Peaches, Arctic Monkeys, Klaxons and more recently Depeche Mode. Shaw has released several solo projects on the band's Delicacies label. Shaw is also a member of the duo Selling with Gold Panda and Shaw & Grossfeldt with visual artist Bas Grossfeldt.

== Discography ==
=== Studio albums ===
List of studio albums, with selected details and chart positions
Title	Album details	Peak chart positions					
Title	Album details	UK	AUS	BEL	SWI	FRA	US Dance
Attack Decay Sustain Release	Released: 18 June 2007; Label: Wichita/Interscope	59	—	—	—	191	11
Temporary Pleasure	Released: 15 August 2009; Label: Wichita	39	42	49	89	138	25
Unpatterns	Released: 14 May 2012; Label: Wichita	74	—	100	—	—	—
Whorl	Released: 9 September 2014; Label: Anti-	121	—	—	—	—	—
Welcome to Sideways	Released: 11 November 2016; Label: Delicacies	—	—	—	—	—	—
Murmurations	Released: 11 May 2018; Label: Wichita	—	—	—	—	—	—

=== Live albums ===
List of live albums, with selected details
Title	Album details
Live in Japan (Japan only)	Released: 7 July 2008; Label: Wichita/Hostess Entertainment
Live	Released: 25 February 2013; Label: Wichita/Delicacies (Simian Mobile Disco's record label)
Live at the Barbican	Released: 20 July 2018; Label: Self-released

=== Remix albums ===
List of remix albums, with selected details
Title	Album details
Sample and Hold	Released: 28 July 2008; Label: Wichita/Interscope
Re-Murmurations	Released: 28 September 2018; Label: Wichita

=== Compilation albums ===
List of compilation albums, with selected details
Title	Album details
Delicacies	Released: 29 November 2010; Label: Delicatessen
Anthology: 10 Years of SMD	Released: 20 October 2017; Label: Delicacies

=== Mix compilations ===
- Mobile Disco 2003 (Disc 2 of The Cornerstone Player Volume 039) (2003)
- Bugged Out! Presents: Suck My Deck (April 2007)
- Mixmag presents: 2007 End Of Year Rave-Up (January 2008)
- I'm a Cliche/The Tokyo Tapes (2008)
- FabricLive.41: Simian Mobile Disco (August 2008)
- Is Fixed (October 2010)
- Mixmag presents: Patterns and Cycles (19 April 2012)

=== EPs ===
- Simian Mobile Disco EP (July 2007, Interscope, US only)
- Clock EP (March 2008, Wichita Recordings)
- Extra Pleasure (14 March 2010, Universal) (also known as Extra Temporary)
- A Form of Change (2 October 2012, Wichita Recordings)
- Whorl Club Mixes EP (9 October 2014, Anti-)
- Wheels Within Wheels EP (15 December 2014, Delicatessen)

=== Singles ===
- "The Mighty Atom / Boatrace / Upside Down" (2004, I'm a Cliche)
- "Piggy in the Middle" (2005, Cassette Records) (backed with "I Freak" by Christine)
- "Pulse" (2005, Click Click Bang)
- "The Count" (2005, Kitsuné Musique) (backed with "Morse Code from the Cold War" by Dieter Schmidt)
- "Hustler" (2006, Wichita Recordings) – UK #152
- "Tits & Acid / Animal House" (2006, White Label)
- "It's the Beat" (March 2007, Wichita Recordings) (with remixes by Graham Massey, Luke Vibert, Riton and Siriusmo) – UK #103
- "I Believe" (July 2007, Wichita Recordings) (backed with "System" and remixes by Switch and Prins Thomas) – UK #118
- "Run: Nike+ Sport Music" (September 2008, Nike, Inc.) (27:37 long running-oriented song released on iTunes, with an edited version as a b-side)
- "Run" (October 2008, White Label) (four edited versions of "Run: Nike+ Sport Music")
- "Synthesise" (February 2009) (with visual accompaniment, released exclusively via Beatport)
- "10,000 Horses Can't Be Wrong" (March 2009) (music video directed by Aries Moross and Alex Sushon, released exclusively via Beatport)
- "Audacity of Huge" featuring Chris Keating from Yeasayer (August 2009) with remixes by Dusty Kid, Dekker & Johan, Maxime Dangles and Naum Gabo – UK #60
- "Cruel Intentions" featuring Beth Ditto from Gossip (January 2010) with remixes by Joker, Greg Wilson, Maurice Fulton and Heartbreaks – UK #102
- "Seraphim" (12 April 2012)
- "Your Love Ain't Fair" / "Witches of Agnesi" (2012)
- "Breaking Time Remixes" (29 April 2013) (remixes of track on A Form of Change by John Tejada and Naum Gabo)
- "Tangents" / "Blake's Hitch" (1 July 2014) (with video accompaniment by Hans Lo and Jack Featherstone)
- "Dervish" / "Gamma Gulch" (29 July 2014)
- "Caught in a Wave" (21 February 2018)
- "We Go" (11 July 2018)

=== Delicacies series ===
- "Aspic" / "Nerve Salad" (23 April 2010)
- "Casu Marzu" / "Thousand Year Egg" (6 September 2010)
- "Skin Cracker" / "Hákarl" (8 November 2010)
- "Sweetbread" / "Ortolan" (8 December 2010)
- "Gizzard" (2011)
- "Tong Zi Dan" / "Escamoles" / "Smalahove" (2013) (with remix by Mike Dehnert)
- "Surstromming" / "Sannakji" (2013) (collaboration with Cosmin TRG)
- "Sacrifice" (10 June 2013) (collaboration with Bicep) (includes two beatless versions)
- "Snake Bile Wine" (20 January 2014) (with remix by Trevino)
- "Hachinoko" / "Ikizukuri" (2014) (collaboration with Roman Flügel) (includes alternate mix of "Ikizukuri")
- "Staring at All This Handle" / "Sky on the Floor" (27 May 2016) (with remixes by Perc and Volte-Face)
- "Remember in Reverse" / "Soft Attack" (15 July 2016) (with remix by DJ Hyperactive)
- "Far Away from a Distance" / "Flying or Falling" (30 September 2016) (with remix by Lena Willikens)
- "Laughing in the Face of Block" (21 October 2016) (with remix by Matrixxman)

=== Remixes ===
List of remixes by Simian Mobile Disco
Year	Title	Artist
2003	"Take Me I'm Yours"	The Droyds
2003	"La Breeze"	Simian
2003	"Never Be Alone"	Simian
2003	"Cymbalon"	Max Waters
2004	"Cherry Blossom Girl"	Air
2004	"Tape 23"	Fans of Kate
2005	"Favorite Friend"	Diefenbach
2005	"Before the Light Goes"	The Fallout Trust
2005	"Ladyflash"	The Go! Team
2005	"State of You"	Hardkandy
2005	"Hold That Gun"	Keith
2005	"Love Is a Deserter"	The Kills
2005	"Morse Code from the Cold War"	Dieter Schmidt
2005	"Here Comes"	Tahiti 80
2006	"Mona Lisa's Child"	Keith
2006	"Magick"	Klaxons
2006	"Downtown"	Peaches
2006	"Are You the One?"	The Presets
2006	"Walking Machine"	Revl9n
2007	"Je t'aime"	Armand Van Helden
2007	"Innocence"	Björk
2007	"Hands Off My Gold"	Celebration
2007	"Let's Make Love and Listen to Death From Above"	Cansei de Ser Sexy
2007	"International Dateline"	Ladytron
2007	"Knights of Cydonia"	Muse
2007	"Whoo! Alright-Yeah... Uh Huh"	The Rapture
2008	"Octet"	Deerhunter
2008	"No Sale No I.D."	The Emperor Machine
2008	"Big Fun"	Kevin Saunderson & Inner City
2008	"Pro Nails"	Kid Sister featuring Kanye West
2009	"Surrender"	Performance
2009	"Hold That Gun" (remix by James Ford)	Keith
2009	"U Can Dance"	DJ Hell
2011	"NvrSayNvr"	Detroit Grand Pubahs and Psycatron
2012	"Orbiter"	John Tejada
2013	"Copy of A"	Nine Inch Nails
2013	"Every Little Piece"	Thomas Schumacher
2014	"Flute Dreams"	Bwana
2014	"Swisher"	Blondes
2016	"The Traveller's Night Song"	Ilya Beshevli
2017	"Where's the Revolution"	Depeche Mode
2017	"Mawal"	Omar Souleyman

=== Jas Shaw solo discography ===
Singles

- "Love Doubled" / "It's Not the Clock That Tells the Time" / "To Mock a Killingbird" (3 November 2015)
- "On a Remorse with No Name" / "Given Half a Chance" / "Brother Midnight" (15 April 2016)
- "No Sign Ahead" / "We the Tin Drummers" / "Still Partly Porpoise" (17 June 2016)
- "Ockham's Eraser" / "Entertaining Angels Unawares" / "I Love You Lost" (19 August 2016)
- "Science & Luck" / "I Dream of Meanie" (26 April 2019)
- "Popes of Discord" / "Reconsider the Lily" (10 May 2019)
- "Merely Bathing" / "Lecturing Birds on How to Fly" (23 May 2019)
- "We That Would Eat the Fruit" / "A Cat in Gloves" (7 June 2019)
- "ToBeYouGotToBe" / "Tic Tacs Without Strategy" (21 June 2019)
- "Kubrick's Rube" / "Touch Anywhere to Begin" (5 July 2019)
- "A Bird with No Feet" / "Freedom for the Pike" (19 July 2019)
- "After the Panic, Comes Euphoria" (12 August 2019)
- "When the Whip Descends" / "Repeat Until There Is No More Other" (16 August 2019)
- "I Am Again" / "You Needn't Be Either" (20 March 2020)
- "Remains of the Klee" / "One More Than Bed" (22 April 2020)
- Sollbruchstelle I: Become the Scenic Route (26 February 2021)
- Sollbruchstelle II: Absent and Incorrect (26 March 2021)
- Sollbruchstelle III: Snacks of Carelessness (23 April 2021)

Albums

- Exquisite Cops (27 September 2019)
- Sollbruchstelle (7 May 2021)
- A Tea Within A Tea (6 December 2024)
- Between the Seed and the Timber (25 July 2025)
