= Sample and Hold =

Remix album by Simian Mobile Disco
- Released: 28 July 2008 (UK)
- Genre: Electronica
- Length: 72:59
- Label: Wichita; Interscope
- Producer: Jas Shaw; James Ford

Simian Mobile Disco chronology
Live in Japan (2008)	Sample and Hold (2008)	FabricLive.41 (2009)

Professional ratings
Review scores
Source	Rating
Pitchfork	3.0/10

Sample and Hold is a remix album by English electronic music duo Simian Mobile Disco. It was released on 28 July 2008 on Wichita Recordings. The track listing resembles that of Attack Decay Sustain Release with the addition of a remix of "Clock", a track from the Clock EP released in March 2008.

== History ==
Each track of the album had been hand picked by Jas Shaw and James Ford, selected from remixes that have been made by DJs the duo encountered during their worldwide travels.

== Track listing ==
1. "Sleep Deprivation" (Simon Baker remix) – 10:19
2. "I Got This Down" (Invisible Conga People remix) – 4:44
3. "It's The Beat" (Shit Robot remix) – 8:14
4. "Hustler" (Joakim remix) – 8:03
5. "Tits & Acid" (Oscillation remix) – 5:28
6. "I Believe" (Pinch's 'I Believe in Bassline Therapy' remix) – 5:10
7. "Hotdog" (Cosmo Vitelli remix) – 7:08
8. "Wooden" (Danton Eeprom remix) – 5:57
9. "Love" (Beyond the Wizard's Sleeve remix) – 6:10
10. "Scott" (Silver Apples remix) – 4:11
11. "Clock" (Chrome Hoof remix) – 7:41
