= FabricLive.42 =

Compilation album by Freq Nasty
- Released: 13 October 2008
- Genre: Electronic
- Label: Fabric
- Producer: Freq Nasty

Freq Nasty chronology
Breakspoll VOL 2 (2006)	FabricLive.42 (2008)

FabricLive chronology
FabricLive.41 (2008)	FabricLive.42 (2008)	FabricLive.43 (2008)

FabricLive.42 is a 2008 mix album by Freq Nasty. The album was released as part of the FabricLive Mix Series.

== Track listing ==
1. Saul Williams - Not in our Name - Pledge of Resistance - Ninja Tune
2. Santogold vs Switch & Freq Nasty - Creator - Warners
3. Freq Nasty vs Propa Tings - Peacemaker - Freq Nasty
4. Madox - Duckalicious (Baobinga's Thugalicious Remix) - Expanded
5. Leon Jean-Marie - Bring it On (Rusko's Granny Smasher Remix) - Universal
6. Reso - If you can't Beat Em - Civil Music
7. Cadence Weapon - House Music - Big Dada
8. L-Vis 1990 - Change the Game - Tres Cool
9. ZZT - Lower State of Consciousness (Original Munich Version) - Turbo
10. Rob Sparx - 2 Faced Rasta (Reso Remix) - Dubting
11. Lee "Scratch" Perry vs The Moody Boyz - God Smiled (Remix) - On-U Sound
12. Tayo - March of the Soundbwoyz - Cool & Deadly/Supercharged
13. Freq Nasty - Come Let Me Know (Acappella) - Skint
14. Baobinga ft. DJ Nasty - State of Ghetto Jackin - Trouble & Bass
15. Epydemix - Thunder Gutter (Dub) - Epydemix
16. Backdraft ft. Sporty-O - Living Like a Hustler - Passenger
17. KRS-One - Sound of da Police (Freq Nasty Breakbeat Bacon Mix) - Zomba
18. The Beat Monkeys - How you Like me Now? (Rico Tubbs Gangsters Mix) - Passenger
19. Buraka Som Sistema - Kaslemba Wegue Wegue (Reso's Aguadente Mash Mix) - Enchufada
20. Freq Nasty vs Heavyweight Dub Champion - Snared (Freq's Donkey Kong Mix) - Giveback
21. TRG - Oi! Killa ! - Cool & Deadly/Supercharged
22. Freq Nasty vs Bassnectar - Viva Tibet (Dub) - Giveback
23. Radioclit vs No Surrender - Godda get It - No Surrender/Ghettopop Records 2007
24. Nate Mars ft. Jahdan - Above & Beyond Dem - Complex Dubz

== Critical reception ==
Professional ratings
Review scores
Source	Rating
Allmusic	3.5/5 stars
Artistdirect	4.5/5 stars
Remix	4/5 stars

The album was positively received by critics, with Artistdirect giving its 4.5 out of 5, calling it music "you throw on when the only passengers in your car are two recently emptied cans of Red Bull and a woofer". Remix called it a "wild romp through present-day breaks and bass". Rick Anderson of Allmusic stated "each track comes across as fairly unexpected: you know it's going to be funky, you know the beats are probably going to lurch around crazily with lots of squelchy synth and frequent reggae vocal samples, but beyond that there's no telling what's going to happen. At its best, the result is thrilling".
