= FreQ Nasty =

Fijian-born New Zealand DJ and music producer

- Born: 15 November 1969 (age 56); Fiji
- Origin: Fiji and New Zealand
- Genres: Electronic; hip hop; breakbeat; dubstep; drum and bass; moombahton
- Years active: 1994–present
- Labels: Botchit & Scarper, Skint, Muti
- Website: www.freqnasty.com

Darin Alexander McFadyen, better known by his stage name FreQ Nasty (born 15 December 1969), is a DJ and producer of breakbeat electronic music, currently based in Los Angeles, California, United States. Born in Fiji and raised in New Zealand, McFadyen's artistic career has taken him across the world, first as a resident in London's Fabric nightclub, to multiple tours in Europe and Australia. He currently resides in the United States, where he has become a fixture amongst North American art and music festivals, most notably Burning Man.

== Background ==
Born in Fiji, McFadyen spent his childhood in New Zealand, where his appreciation for music began at an early age. He credits his parents for his introduction to many different genres, most notably blues, jazz, and Polynesian styles of music. He also acknowledges to being an ardent fan of the Beatles during his adolescence. While in school, he learned how to play guitar and drums, which he played in various bands. Soon after his early exposure to writing music, he began to DJ and produce his own style of electronic music, drawing upon the influences of artists such as Funkadelic, Billy Boyo and the Greensleeves, and Public Enemy. Aside from his pursuits as a musician, McFadyen has also been a longtime practitioner of yoga and Buddhism. Having practiced yoga since 1999 with the Satyananda lineage in London, he has also studied yoga and Buddhism with Buddhist monk and Professor of Comparative Religion Venerable Sumati Marut since 2007. McFadyen married Gabriela Valentina Ocampo on 15 December 2018.

== Production career ==
FreQ Nasty has widely been considered a pioneer in breakbeat music since the genre's initial rise in popularity. FreQ Nasty began his career in 1998 on the UK label Botchit & Scarper, where he forged his sound of ragga, hip-hop, dancehall, and heavy basslines at the apex London's 1990s dance music revolution. Of his early releases, the singles "Boomin Back Atcha" and "Move Back" quickly became classics within the breaks genre. In 2003, he moved to Skint Records, where he went on to release a list of top records, collaborating with and remixing a diverse range of artists including Fatboy Slim, Kelis, KRS-One, Roots Manuva, Rodney P, Bassnectar, Tipper, and reggae legend Junior Delgado. 2008 saw the release of "Creator", his crossover hit collaboration with Santigold and producer Switch, and the Fabric Live 42 mix CD, which was picked as DJ Magazine's compilation of the month. In early 2011, he released "Dread at the Controls" under California label Muti Music, which subsequently launched the seventeen-city "Monsters of Bass" tour. In that following December, FreQ's Low FreQuency Pureland EP was released, earning DJ Magazine's selection as the MoneyShot release for December, receiving a 10 out of 10 rating.

== Activism and side projects ==
Alongside his career as an established music producer, FreQ Nasty is also known for his engagement as a social activist. In early 2008, he launched Giveback.net, a socially conscious website in which musicians donate music in support of non-profit "action campaigns" via music campaigns featured on the site. The first campaign, in support of the Tibetan People's Uprising Movement, featured a collaboration with Bassnectar on the single "Viva Tibet". FreQ Nasty has been a vocal advocate for musicians reaching out to support social issues, to which he is quoted:

It's time we as a music community reached out on a grassroots level and showed some love to those who need it, to whatever extent we feel able. Most of us don't vote, most of us see the news as something that happens to somebody else, and most of us have excess that the majority of the people we see on the news can only dream of. If we can help spread the idea that creating positive change in the world elsewhere is an investment in our own security and happiness, then I'm a happy DJ.

— FreQ Nasty, Giveback.net

FreQ Nasty also collaborated with San Francisco-based Heavyweight Dub Champion, remixing the group's "Snared" single in support of The World Family's creation of an irrigation system in the village of Gara Dima, Ethiopia. A similar collaboration was completed with singer-songwriter Michael Franti, in which Franti's single "The Future" was remixed in support of a Bay Area nonprofit to help create a music studio for at-risk youth in San Francisco's Bayview-Hunters Point district. FreQ's current side projects include the Dub Kirtan All Stars, a live 10 piece band of singers and musicians formed with producer David Starfire, and The Yoga of Bass, a series of talks given with yoga teacher Claire Thompson, both of which seek to open up the Yoga tradition to underground dance music club audiences.

== Discography ==
=== Albums ===
- Freq's, Geeks & Mutilations (1999), Botchit & Scarper Records
- Bring Me the Head of Freq Nasty (2003), Skint Records

=== Singles and EPs ===
- Mars Booms Back (1997), [instrumental version of 1999 single 'Boomin Back Atcha] - track 3 on 'Beats By Dope Demand 4' Compilation, 2 × CD + 2 x Vinyl on Kickin Records (KICKCD58)
- Underglass (1997), Botchit & Scarper Records
- Freqazoid (1997), Botchit & Scarper Records
- FreQ Nasty feat. Phoebe One - Boomin' Back Atcha (1999), Botchit & Scarper Records
- Move Back (1999), Botchit & Scarper Records
- Tipper / FreQ Nasty & DJ Dee Kline - Electric Kingdom Vol. 2, Part 1 (2000), Electric Kingdom (US)
- Fresh / One More Time (2001), Skint Records
- Transforma / Amped (2001), Skint Records
- That's My Style (2001), Skint Records
- DJ Dee Kline vs. FreQ Nasty - Every Posse & Crew (2002), Rat Records
- FreQ Nasty feat. Rodney P - Come Let Me Know (2003), Skint Records
- Punkadelic (2004), Skint Records
- Sil Num Tao (2004), Skint Records
- Brooklyn to Brixton (2004), Skint Records
- Mad Situation feat. Junior Delgado (2005), Skint Records
- FreQ Nasty vs. Bassnectar - Viva Tibet (2008) (Produced with Bassnectar, this song was released exclusively on Giveback.net in support of their "March to Tibet" action campaign.)
- Dread at the Controls (2011), Muti Music
- Warm Dark Place (Eyes on the Prize) (2011)
- Low FreQuency Pureland (2011), FreQ Nasty Recordings
- Bon Merde (2012), High Chai
- Dread at the Controls Remixed (2012), Muti Music

=== DJ mixes ===
- Y4K: Next Level Breaks (2002), Distinctive Breaks Records
- Breakspoll Presents: Vol.2 (2006), Super Charged
- Fabric Live 42 (2008), Fabric
