= FabricLive.41 =

Compilation album by Simian Mobile Disco
- Released: 4 August 2008
- Genre: Electronica
- Label: Fabric
- Producer: Jas Shaw; James Ford

Simian Mobile Disco chronology
Sample and Hold (2008)	FabricLive.41 (2008)	Temporary Pleasure (2009)

FabricLive chronology
FabricLive.40 (2008)	FabricLive.41 (2008)	FabricLive.42 (2008)

FabricLive.41 is a 2008 mix album by English electronic music duo Simian Mobile Disco. The album was released as part of the FabricLive mix series.

== Track listing ==
1. Tomita – "The Firebird – Infernal Dance of King Kastchei" (clean version) – 0:13
2. Sisters of Transistors – "The Don" – 2:52
3. Simian Mobile Disco – "Simple" – 4:31
4. Hercules and Love Affair – "Blind" (Serge Santiago version) – 6:26
5. Smith n Hack – "Space Warrior" – 2:41
6. Discodeine – "Joystick" – 3:48
7. Shit Robot – "Chasm" – 5:14
8. Perc & Fractal – "Up Tool" – 1:39
9. Metro Area – "Miura" – 3:32
10. The Worthy – "Crack EL" – 2:31
11. Moondog – "Suite Equestria" – 2:46
12. Fine Cut Bodies – "Huncut Hacuka" – 3:31
13. Bentobox – "Aemono" – 2:44
14. Deadmau5 vs Jelo – "The Reward Is Cheese" – 3:32
15. Simian Mobile Disco – "Sleep Deprivation" (Simon Baker remix) – 4:58
16. Popof – "The Chomper" (LSD version) – 3:28
17. Raymond Scott – "Cindy Electronium" – 2:13
18. Paul Woolford presents: Bobby Peru – "Erotic Discourse" – 2:28
19. Moebius-Plank-Neumeier – "Pitch Control" – 1:13
20. Plastikman – "Spastik" – 1:59
21. Green Velvet – "Flash" – 5:58
22. The Walker Brothers – "Nite Flights" (album version) – 3:58
