= Simian Mobile Disco EP =

EP by Simian Mobile Disco
- Released: (United States) 24 July 2007
- Genre: Electronic; house; minimal
- Length: 20:00
- Label: Interscope
- Producer: James Ford, James Shaw

Simian Mobile Disco chronology
Attack Decay Sustain Release (2007)	Simian Mobile Disco EP (2007)	Clock EP (2008)

Professional ratings
Review scores
Source	Rating
Prefix	positive link

Simian Mobile Disco EP is the first EP by the British electronic band Simian Mobile Disco. It was released on 24 July 2007 on Interscope Records.

== History ==
This EP was released in the United States as Clock EP in 2008 with a slightly different track listing. Its main purpose was to present Simian Mobile Disco to an American audience, which is why the first track was changed to "Clock" rather than "Tits & Acid".

The release of this EP was followed then by Attack Decay Sustain Release on 11 September 2007.

== Track listing ==
All tracks written by J. Shaw and J. Ford.

1. "Tits & Acid" – 4:04
2. "Simple" – 5:56
3. "3 Pin Din" – 5:01
4. "State of Things" – 4:59
