= Murmurations (album) =

Studio album by Simian Mobile Disco
- Released: 11 May 2018
- Length: 53:49
- Label: Wichita

Simian Mobile Disco chronology
Welcome to Sideways (2016)	Murmurations (2018)

Murmurations is the sixth studio album by English electronic music duo Simian Mobile Disco. It was released on 11 May 2018 under Wichita Recordings. The album title and many of the track titles are inspired by how the members of the choir ended up following the sounds of their nearest neighbors, much like flocking birds.

== Critical reception ==
Professional ratings
Aggregate scores
Source	Rating
Metacritic	75/100
Review scores
Source	Rating
AllMusic	4/5 stars
The Guardian	5/5 stars
NME	4/5 stars
Pitchfork	7.5/10

Murmurations was met with "generally favorable" reviews from critics. At Metacritic, which assigns a weighted average rating out of 100 to reviews from mainstream publications, this release received an average score of 75, based on 13 reviews.

== Track listing ==
Murmurations track listing
No.	Title	Writer(s)	Length
1.	"Boids"	James Ford; James Shaw	4:32
2.	"Caught in a Wave" (featuring the Deep Throat Choir)	Ford; Shaw; Heloise Tunstall-Behrens	6:43
3.	"We Go" (featuring the Deep Throat Choir)	Ford; Shaw; Louisa Gerstein	8:31
4.	"Gliders"	Ford; Shaw; Gerstein	3:39
5.	"Hey Sister" (featuring the Deep Throat Choir)	Ford; Shaw; Gerstein	5:37
6.	"A Perfect Swarm"	Ford; Shaw	8:20
7.	"Defender" (featuring the Deep Throat Choir)	Ford; Shaw; Gerstein	7:24
8.	"V Formation"	Ford; Shaw	6:49
9.	"Murmuration"	Ford; Shaw	2:14

== Re-Murmurations ==
A remix album called Re-Murmurations was released on September 28, 2018.

=== Track listing ===
No.	Title	Length
1.	"Caught in a Wave (Jas Shaw 15 Volts Mix 1)" (featuring Deep Throat Choir)	6:58
2.	"Caught in a Wave (Jas Shaw 15 Volts Mix 2)" (featuring Deep Throat Choir)	6:46
3.	"Hey Sister (Jas Shaw Chant Mix)" (featuring Deep Throat Choir)	7:03
4.	"Hey Sister (Jas Shaw Carillon Mix)" (featuring Deep Throat Choir)	8:24
5.	"V Formation (Jas Shaw Misfits Mix)"	6:27
6.	"Murmuration (Jas Shaw 7&half IPS Mix)"	4:40
7.	"Defender (Jas Shaw AFK Mix)" (featuring Deep Throat Choir)	4:33
8.	"Defender (Jas Shaw Locked Loops Mix)" (featuring Deep Throat Choir)	6:46
9.	"Caught in a Wave (Jas Shaw 15 Volts Instrumental 1)"	6:57
10.	"Caught in a Wave (Jas Shaw 15 Volts Instrumental 2)"	6:01
11.	"Hey Sister (Jas Shaw Chant Drum Tool)"	7:00
12.	"Hey Sister (Jas Shaw Carillon Dub)"	7:06
