= Unpatterns =

Studio album by Simian Mobile Disco
- Released: 14 May 2012
- Genres: Electronic, tech house
- Length: 51:29
- Label: Wichita
- Producers: James Ford, Jas Shaw

Simian Mobile Disco chronology
Delicacies (2010)	Unpatterns (2012)	A Form of Change EP (2012)

Unpatterns is the third studio album by English electronic music duo Simian Mobile Disco, released on 14 May 2012 by Wichita Recordings.

== Cover ==
The deluxe edition of the CD was released with a back to front CD case. The reason for this is that the "rear" cover, which is screen printed with a set of wavy lines, together with the reverse-packed printed CD, form a moiré pattern which can be manipulated by rotating the CD in its case.

== Release ==
The album was released on 14 May 2012 in the UK. The entire album was also released for free online through SoundCloud on the same day. In February, as a taster before the release, they posted the two-minute track "Fourteenth Principles" on their SoundCloud account.

== Critical reception ==
Professional ratings
Aggregate scores
Source	Rating
Metacritic	69/100
Review scores
Source	Rating
AllMusic	4/5 stars
Clash	6/10
Drowned in Sound	8/10
The Guardian	4/5 stars
The Independent	favourable
Pitchfork	6.2/10
Resident Advisor	4/5

Unpatterns received generally positive reviews from music critics. At Metacritic, which assigns a normalised rating out of 100 to reviews from mainstream critics, the album received an average score of 69, based on 22 reviews, which indicates "generally favorable reviews". Lauren Strain of Drowned in Sound described the general sound of the album as "gigantic, open-armed, open-air pop, and femur-fracturing analogue techno". She commented on the "dark, uneasy undercurrent that gives everything, even the more straightforward party tracks, an edge of the ominous", stating that "this tightly controlled sense of threat, syringed out in timed doses, has always been SMD's strength"; opining overall that "Unpatterns is not without fault – the closing trio of tracks is forgettable – but it contains perhaps some of the pair's best work, and anyone who loved the nastier side of Attack, Decay, Sustain, Release but balked at Delicacies' measured gore should get back on board".

Phelan Laurence of The Independent called the tracks on the album are "solid, polished [and] dancefloor-friendly", through did find that "it's only on 'Put Your Hands Together' that we're reminded of their nifty way with a vocal hook". The Guardian's Paul MacInnes felt that "a lot of time has been spent on this record, and it shows: every tone has the clarity of applied refinement", stating that "this lends the album a degree of beauty, one reinforced by the delicacy of the songs' composition". He did, however, find that the album was "one step removed from club music", stating that barring a couple of tracks, "the rest is music in which to lose your thoughts, rather than your T-shirt". Joe Rivers of Clash found that while the album did contain "The hallmarks of Simian Mobile Disco", in that the beats and loops utilised felt the same, he felt the lack of vocals on the album was a problem, stating that "many of the tracks just feel like they're missing a vital component"; concluding "the individual components sound fantastic, but high audio quality does not a good record make".

== Track listing ==
All tracks are written by James Ford and Jas Shaw, except where noted.

No.	Title	Length
1.	"I Waited for You"	4:30
2.	"Cerulean"	6:48
3.	"Seraphim"	3:49
4.	"A Species Out of Control"	5:18
5.	"Interference"	6:39
6.	"Put Your Hands Together" (Ford, Shaw, Jamie Lidell)	7:20
7.	"The Dream of the Fisherman's Wife"	5:00
8.	"Your Love Ain't Fair"	5:10
9.	"Pareidolia"	6:55

iTunes bonus track
No.	Title	Length
10.	"Everyday"	5:34

Notes: • The CD release of Unpatterns the track “put your hands together” is misspelled as “PUT YOUR HANNDS TOGETHER”

== Charts ==
Chart (2012)	Peak position
Belgian Albums Chart (Flanders)	100
Irish Indie Albums Chart	20
UK Albums Chart	74
UK Dance Albums Chart	7
UK Indie Albums Chart	12
