= Temporary Pleasure =

Studio album by Simian Mobile Disco
- Released: 17 August 2009
- Recorded: 2008–2009
- Studio: Band's East London studio
- Genres: Electronic, tech house
- Length: 41:44
- Label: Wichita Recordings
- Producer: James Ford

Simian Mobile Disco chronology
FabricLive.41 (2008)	Temporary Pleasure (2009)	Delicacies (2010)

Singles from Temporary Pleasure
- 1. "Audacity of Huge" Released: 3 August 2009; 2. "Cruel Intentions" Released: 4 January 2010

Alternative cover
- "Temporary Pleasure" (Limited Edition Box)

Alternative cover
- "Temporary Pleasure" (Promotional cover)

Alternative cover
- "Extra Temporary" (Digital release)

Professional ratings
Review scores
Source	Rating
AllMusic	4/5 stars
BBC	Favourable
Clash	7/10 stars
Drowned in Sound	7/10 stars
The Guardian	3/5 stars
The Independent	3/5 stars
NME	4/10 stars
Pitchfork	6.5/10.0
PopMatters	6/10 stars
The Times	4/5 stars

Temporary Pleasure is the second album by Simian Mobile Disco. It was released in the United Kingdom on 17 August 2009. It was available in LP, CD and deluxe limited edition CD formats.

== History ==
The album was recorded throughout 2008 and 2009 in the band's studio in East London by James Ford and Damon Albarn, the Blur frontman. Taking time during their world tour of DJing and performing live, they recorded with guests such as Beth Ditto (from Gossip) and Alexis Taylor (from Hot Chip). This was preceded by the release of a new single "Audacity of Huge" (featuring Chris Keating from Yeasayer) on 3 August 2009. Prior to its release, the band streamed a low quality version of the single on their official website from 22 May 2009.

== Track listing ==
Standard edition

No.	Title	Length
1.	"Cream Dream" (featuring Gruff Rhys)	3:58
2.	"Audacity of Huge" (featuring Chris Keating)	3:48
3.	"10000 Horses Can't Be Wrong"	4:11
4.	"Cruel Intentions" (featuring Beth Ditto)	3:02
5.	"Off the Map" (featuring Jamie Lidell)	4:02
6.	"Synthesise"	4:53
7.	"Bad Blood" (featuring Alexis Taylor)	3:58
8.	"Turn Up the Dial" (featuring Young Fathers)	4:00
9.	"Ambulance"	5:40
10.	"Pinball" (featuring Telepathe)	3:56

Limited edition second disc

No.	Title	Length
1.	"Flea in Your Ear"	7:23
2.	"Are You in the Picture?"	6:27
3.	"Babaghanoush"	8:19
4.	"Do Not Exceed Stated Dose"	6:12

== Extra Temporary/Extra Pleasure ==
Both of these titles refer to the same release of the four bonus tracks included in the limited edition of the Temporary Pleasure studio album. Yet the track listing differs slightly on the Beatport version, on which is featured a new studio recording of "Belvedere" as well as a remix of the first track.

No.	Title	Length
1.	"Flea in Your Ear"	7:23
2.	"Are You in the Picture?"	6:27
3.	"Babaghanoush"	8:19
4.	"Do Not Exceed Stated Dose"	6:12
5.	"Belvedere" (exclusive to Beatport release)	5:28
6.	"Flea in Your Ear" (Flange Bliss Remix; exclusive to Beatport release)	6:22

== Charts ==
Chart (2009)	Peak position
Australian Albums (ARIA)	42
Belgian Albums (Ultratop Flanders)	49
French Albums (SNEP)	138
Swiss Albums (Schweizer Hitparade)	89
UK Albums (Official Charts)	39
