= David Altmejd =

Canadian sculptor (born 1974)

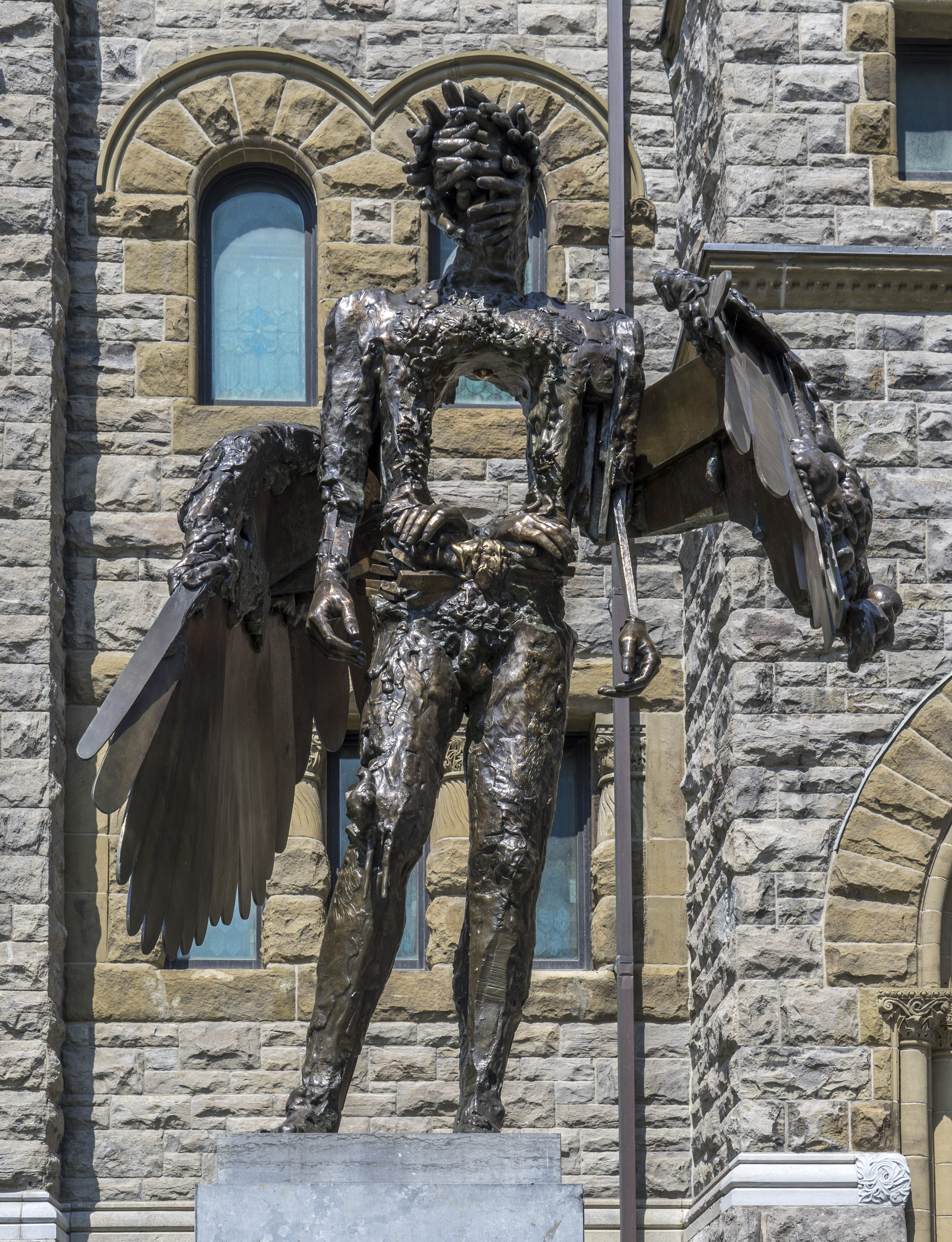
- The Eye, 2011, bronze, (355 x 248 x 235cm), Claire and Marc Bourgie pavilion, Montreal, Quebec. Donation of the artist and the employees of the MMFA
- Born: 1974 (age 51–52); Montreal, Quebec
- Known for: Sculpting

David Altmejd (born 1974) is a Canadian sculptor who lives and works in Los Angeles. He creates highly detailed sculptures that often blur the distinction between interior and exterior, surface and structure, the beautiful and grotesque, figurative representation and abstraction.

== Early life and education ==
Born in 1974, in Montreal, Altmejd earned a Bachelor of Fine Arts from the Université du Québec à Montréal. Altmejd completed his Masters of Fine Arts at Columbia University in 2001.

== Work ==
Altmejd's sculptures present viewers with an amalgam of organic random objects such as decapitated werewolf heads with graffiti-style Stars of David, towers made of mirrors, plastic flowers and costume jewelry as creative tools for sculptural systems loaded with what he calls "symbolic potential" and "open-ended" narratives. Altmejd deals with duality in his work, between the contrasts of the beautiful and the grotesque, figurative representation and abstraction, interior and exterior. For Altmejd, there is tension in the dualities of opposites, which is how he creates energy in his work. He is known for the werewolf heads that appear frequently in his work and were featured prominently in his 2011 solo exhibition at the Brant Foundation, Art Study Centre, Greenwich, Connecticut, including many other sculpture platforms. Literary figures and popular cultural icons are central to his art and have been seen as in some way resembling the artist, such as Louise Bourgeois, Kiki Smith, Matthew Barney, Paul McCarthy, Minimalist artist Sol LeWitt and Donald Judd, and novelists and filmmakers, David Cronenberg, Jorge Luis Borges, and Mary Shelley.

Kara L. Rooney writes of his work, The Vessel (2011), the central piece in his March 2011 show at Andrea Rosen Gallery:

Like Altmejd's figurative giants, 'The Vessel' contains a myriad number of small universes that lodge themselves like secrets in pockets of flesh and plastic. Lengths of fine gold chain, Plasticine hands and ears, shards of mirror and quartz, spools of multi-colored thread, seahorse and insect casts, as well as abstracted references to Avian gods, such as cranes and other airborne creatures, swarm the Plexi castle in a cacophony of frozen movement.

In 2016, Altmejd designed the art for Yeasayer's album Amen & Goodbye which the band described as "Sgt Pepper meets Hieronymus Bosch meets Dalí meets PeeWee's Playhouse".

== Exhibitions ==
Since graduating with an MFA, Altmejd has taken part in many solo and group exhibitions globally, including numerous exhibitions with galleries that represented his work, Andrea Rosen Gallery, N.Y., and Stuart Shave/Modern Art, London. Altmejd's The Swarm at the Andrea Rosen Gallery received acclaim for its new and nuanced approach to sculpture as opposed to his previous monolithic works. In 2003, he participated in the 8th International Istanbul Biennial, Poetic Justice curated by Dan Cameron; in 2004, he was included in the Whitney Biennial of American Art curated by the team composed of Chrissie Illes, Shamim M. Momin and Debra Singer to showcase new art made in America. In addition to these exhibitions, he had a solo exhibition at Oakville Galleries in Gairloch Gardens, Metamorphosis (2007) curated by Louise Déry and organized as a travelling exhibition to Galérie de l'UQAM, Montreal, QC, Canada, and the Illingworth Kerr Gallery, Alberta University of the Arts, Calgary, Alberta.

In 2007, Altmejd represented Canada at the Venice Biennale; his installation The Index and The Giant, was commissioned by curator, Louise Déry for the Canadian pavilion. The sculpture installation was subsequently purchased by the Art Gallery of Ontario, Toronto, and a second part of the installation was acquired by a private collector in Greece.

His work has appeared in major exhibitions at the National Gallery of Canada, Ottawa (2010), the New Museum (2010) and the Solomon R. Guggenheim Museum (2010); the Brant Foundation Art Study Center (2011); MOCA Cleveland, Cleveland (2012); Musée d'Art Moderne de la Ville de Paris, Paris (2015); the Louisiana Museum of Modern Art, Humlebaek (2015); the Mudam Luxembourg, Musée d'art moderne Grand- Duc Jean, Luxembourg (2015-2016); and the Royal Museums of Fine Arts of Belgium, Brussels (2016). From an early date, his work was featured in contemporary Canadian group exhibitions, Artifice 98 at the Saidye Bronfman Art Center, Montreal (1998), the Québec Triennial at the Musée d'art contemporain de Montréal, Montreal (2008); Intrus/Intruders at the Musée national des beaux-arts du Québec, Quebec City (2008) and many more cultural venues.

His more recent work includes solo exhibitions at the Royal Museums of Fine Arts of Belgium, White Cube in Hong Kong (2019), and the David Kordansky Gallery in Los Angeles (2021). His most recent solo exhibition was Mason's Yard at White Cube, which consisted of portrait heads and busts of fantastical human–animal hybrids. He has also appeared in group exhibitions in The Thick Stream in Canada, New York (2021); Herzliya Museum of Contemporary Art in Herzliya, Israel (2023); and Guangdong Times Museum in Guangzhou, China.

== Documentary ==
- 2012: Chaorismatique, David Altmejd, sculpteur (dir. Rénald Bellemare)
