= Delicacies (album) =

Studio album by Simian Mobile Disco
- Released: 29 November 2010
- Recorded: Band's East London studio
- Genre: Electronic
- Label: Delicatessen
- Producer: Simian Mobile Disco

Simian Mobile Disco chronology
Temporary Pleasure (2009)	Delicacies (2010)	Unpatterns (2012)

Singles from Delicacies
- 1. "Aspic/Nerve Salad" Released: 23 April 2010; 2. "Casu Marzu/1000 Year Egg" Released: 6 September 2010

Delicacies is a compilation album by British electronic band Simian Mobile Disco. It was released on the iTunes Store on 23 November 2010, and released in physical form on 29 November 2010. It is a collection of tracks inspired and named for various unusual foods the band have sampled while touring the world, hence the name.

== History ==
During the introduction of their Essential Mix made for Radio 1, broadcast on 9 January 2010, they gave hints on what would be a "techno-based album" expected for later in 2010. Since then, the duo also established a quarterly residency to JDH and Dave P’s Fixed nights, in New York City.

In March 2010 the duo announced their new club night project Delicatessen, curated by the duo and accompanied by what they said to be "a brand new imprint" entitled Delicacies. The aim of the label was to release tracks digitally and on vinyl that are longer and more techno based, Simian Mobile Disco announced that every track would “take the name of an exotic, and often bizarre, delicacy from around the world.” The first single on Delicacies was released in late April, titled "Aspic" with the B-side "Nerve Salad". This was followed in September 2010 by "Casu Marzu/Thousand Year Egg", which was sold digitally through the band’s Facebook page.

On 12 October 2010, the band announced that they would release an album of the tracks in November, collecting all the tracks, unmixed, on one disc, with the second disc comprising a studio mix of the tracks.

== Track listing ==
Disc one: unmixed

No.	Title	Length
1.	"Aspic"	8:01
2.	"Nerve Salad"	9:41
3.	"Casu Marzu"	8:15
4.	"Thousand Year Egg"	8:16
5.	"Skin Cracker"	7:09
6.	"Hákarl"	9:24
7.	"Sweetbread"	9:35
8.	"Ortolan"	7:30
9.	"Fugu"	7:16

Disc two: mixed

No.	Title	Length
1.	"Sweetbread"
2.	"Hákarl"
3.	"Nerve Salad"
4.	"Casu Marzu"
5.	"Skin Cracker"
6.	"Aspic"
7.	"Thousand Year Egg Drumapella"
8.	"Ortolan"
