= Erotic Reruns =

Studio album by Yeasayer
- Released: 7 June 2019
- Recorded: 2016 – 2019
- Studios: Brooklyn, New York
- Length: 29:05
- Label: Yeasayer Records
- Producers: Chris Keating; Anand Wilder; Ira Wolf Tuton

Yeasayer chronology
Amen & Goodbye (2016)	Erotic Reruns (2019)

Singles from Erotic Reruns
- 1. "I'll Kiss You Tonight" Released: April 5, 2019; 2. "Fluttering in the Floodlights" Released: April 10, 2019; 3. "Let Me Listen in on You" Released: April 10, 2019; 4. "Ecstatic Baby" Released: May 17, 2019

Erotic Reruns is the fifth and final studio album by American experimental rock band Yeasayer. It was released on June 7, 2019 through the band's own label, Yeasayer Records. Recorded between 2016 and 2019 the album was self produced by the band. It centres on the themes such as politics, the aftermath of the election of President Trump, the erosion of civil liberties along with the rise of the "surveillance state", love and personal recollection.

"I'll Kiss You Tonight", "Fluttering in the Floodlights", "Let Me Listen in on You" and "Ecstatic Baby" were released as singles from the album. The album received positive reviews from music critics upon release.

== Recording and production ==
Erotic Reruns was recorded in Brooklyn as well as upstate New York at recording studios each of the band members had built in their own homes. Through a press release promoting the album the band characterised the record as "a sardonic and chilling reaction to dark times" with "moments of warmth and reflection”. Early production on the album started in late 2016 in reaction to the 2016 United States Presidential Election results. The album as with previous recordings was self produced, the band opted to record a majority of the album live in the studio according to Anand Wilder, speaking with Clash Magazine he stated: "With this album we tried not to just add overdubs onto demos, but to really start again from scratch, all of us sitting in a room and playing things live" elaborating: "All of the songs really started in the form that you hear them on the album, as live recordings of the three of us playing together.”

The band were supported in the studio by several session musicians including Walter Fancourt, Jonathan Garin, Noah Hecht, Daniel Neiman, Grady Owens and Nathan and Luke Schram. Adding various additional instrumentation to the album such as drums, horns, odular synths, strings and providing backing vocals to several tracks.

== Composition ==
The album was entirely produced by the band themselves and is a departure from the group's previous album Amen & Goodbye's progressive and psychedelic tendencies, with the record moving into a Pop leaning structure. Speaking in an Interview with Clash Magazine Anand Wilder spoke about the band moving away from long song intros for the record: "We were following the Tom Petty credo of ‘don’t bore us, get to the chorus’". Discussing the band moving away from past albums' structures Wilder went on to say: "we’ve had verses and choruses and maybe a bridge that we go to, but then we’ve cluttered those songs up with a lot of strange sounds and noises. This time we were trying to make all the noises fit the songs."

Politics played heavy into the songwriting on the record with "Blue Skies Dandelions" alluding to the firing of James Comey by President Trump to ease the pressure of the Russia Investigation. “Let Me Listen In On You” is a commentary on the surveillance state and its growing use of technology to gather information on private citizens.

== Release and promotion ==
The album was released on June 7, 2019 through the band's own label imprint and will be available on CD and vinyl record, as well as most streaming services and digital store fronts. Pre-orders of the album received the singles "I'll Kiss You Tonight" and "Fluttering in the Floodlights" as instant downloads. On June 13, 2019 BBC Radio 6 in the United Kingdom named Erotic Reruns their pick for "Album of the Day".

"I'll Kiss You Tonight" was released as the lead single from the album on April 5, 2019, with an animated music video directed by Brooklyn artist Theodore Sefcik. "Fluttering in the Floodlights" and "Let Me Listen in on You" followed on April 10, 2019 as the second and third. "Ecstatic Baby" was issued as the fourth single on May 17, 2019. On June 6, 2019 a music video for "Ecstatic Baby" was released. It was directed by PandaPanther, a New York-based animation studio.

Following the release of Erotic Reruns to promote the album the band announced a 25-date summer tour of the United States in June and July 2019. The tour will conclude with hometown headlining show at the newly re-opened Webster Hall in New York City.

== Critical reception ==
Professional ratings
Aggregate scores
Source	Rating
Metacritic	63/100
Review scores
Source	Rating
All Music	3.5/5 stars
Clash	7/10 stars
The Line of Best Fit	8.5/10 stars
Loud and Quiet	6/10 stars
The Music	4/5 stars
Paste	6.9/10 stars
Pitchfork	5.5/10 stars
Slant Magazine	2/5 stars
Under the Radar	5.5/10 stars

Erotic Reruns received positive reviews from music critics upon release. At Metacritic, which assigns a normalized rating out of 100 to reviews from mainstream critics, the album has an average score of 63 out of 100, which indicates "generally favorable reviews" based on 9 reviews.

Christopher Hamilton-Peach writing for The Line of Best Fit gave the album a positive review, scoring it 8.5/10 and praising the band's evolution: "Straddling eclectic unpredictability and hook-laden gleam, this effort sees the three-piece honing their sonic palette, as they have previously achieved with equal success in their oeuvre." Sarah Bradbury of Clash Magazine gave the album 7/10, summarizing the record as: "Emanating joyful warmth in spite of a seething thread of cynicism amid troubled political times" whilst singling out tracks she wrote: "pure elation abounds in ‘Ecstatic Baby’".

Andy Crump of Paste Magazine gave the album a mostly positive review, wishing the band to have pushed the political commentary on the record further he wrote: "Erotic Reruns’ keeps most of its critique low-key, wrapping it so thoroughly in longing and libido that unwrapping one from the other becomes near-impossible", summarizing: "What the album lacks in fine-tuning it makes up for in sheer experiential pleasure. It’s a half hour bop for the American experiment’s gradual decay."

Under the Radar writer Austin Trunick gave Erotic Reruns a mixed review, scoring the album 5.5/10. He elaborated that whilst he appreciated the band's evolution between records: "This compulsive experimentation is one of the things that has kept Yeasayer so relevant more than a decade past their smash debut All Hours Cymbal" Trunick preferred the band's more experimental releases: "Only on "24-Hour Hateful Live!"—with its shifting vocal styles, odd effects, and sax accompaniment—does the band let their freak flag flap freely in the wind" feeling that the band had: "some sort of self-imposed restrictions to reign themselves in".

== Track listing ==
All tracks are written by Chris Keating, Anand Wilder and Ira Wolf Tuton.

No.	Title	Length
1.	"People I Loved"	2:46
2.	"Ecstatic Baby"	2:54
3.	"Crack a Smile"	3:52
4.	"Blue Skies Dandelions"	3:05
5.	"Let Me Listen in on You"	3:52
6.	"I'll Kiss You Tonight"	3:03
7.	"24-Hour Hateful Live!"	2:52
8.	"Ohm Death"	2:54
9.	"Fluttering in the Floodlights"	3:52
Total length:		29:05

== Charts ==
Chart (2019)	Peak position
US Heatseekers Albums (Billboard)	18

== Release history ==
Region	Date	Format	Label
Various	June 7, 2019	CD; LP; digital download	Yeasayer Records
