= Whorl (album) =

Studio album by Simian Mobile Disco
- Released: 9 September 2014
- Length: 64:35
- Label: Anti-

Simian Mobile Disco chronology
Unpatterns (2012)	Whorl (2014)	Welcome to Sideways (2016)

Professional ratings
Aggregate scores
Source	Rating
Metacritic	69/100
Review scores
Source	Rating
Consequence of Sound	B−
The Line of Best Fit	6/10
Pitchfork	6.5/10
Under the Radar	5/10 stars

Whorl is the fourth studio album by Simian Mobile Disco, which was released on 9 September 2014 through Anti-.

== Track listing ==
1. "Redshift" – 3:52
2. "Dandelion Spheres" – 3:33
3. "Sun Dogs" – 7:28
4. "Hypnick Jerk" – 6:02
5. "Dervish" – 5:49
6. "Z Space" – 4:36
7. "Nazard" – 5:12
8. "Calyx" – 7:19
9. "Jam Side Up" – 5:36
10. "Tangents" – 6:34
11. "Iron Henge" – 5:25
12. "Casiopeia" – 3:12

== Charts ==
Chart performance for Whorl
Chart (2014)	Peak position
UK Albums (OCC)	121
UK Dance Albums (Official Charts)	21
UK Independent Albums (Official Charts)	21
