= Mapfumo =

Mapfumo is a Zimbabwean surname. Notable people with the surname include:

- Arson Mapfumo, a Zimbabwean boxer
- Douglas Mapfumo, a Zimbabwean footballer
- Leonard Mapfumo, a Zimbabwean singer-songwriter
- Runyararo Mapfumo, a British film director
- Thomas Mapfumo, a Zimbabwean musician
