= Radical Friend =

American filmmaker duo

Radical Friend is an American directing duo consisting of filmmakers Julia Grigorian and Kirby McClure. They are known for creating music videos for artists Yeasayer, Skrillex, Black Moth Super Rainbow, and H09909.

Grigorian and McClure met and began collaborating before graduating from art school. Following a string of innovative music videos, they were profiled by Vice and Intel's "The Creators Project" in 2010 and Filmmaker Magazine included them as one of the "25 New Faces of Independent Film".

In 2013 they were commissioned by Lexus to create "Design Disrupted", a live performance starring Coco Rocha that combined holographic technology, avant-garde dance, and 3D projection mapping. That year they premiered their short experimental film "SWEAT" at the Toronto International Film Festival.

Rolling Stone Germany featured Radical Friend as one of 50 "People Who Will Change the Future of Music”.

In 2016 Radical Friend was approached by Britney Spears and MTV to create a short film announcing her return to the MTV VMAS. They are signed with Partizan for world wide representation.

Radical Friend have directed commercials for brands like Honda, Superdry, KFC, Adidas, Instax, and Netflix.
