= Attack Decay Sustain Release =

Studio album by Simian Mobile Disco
- Released: 18 June 2007
- Genres: Electro house, tech house
- Length: 36:53
- Labels: Wichita, Interscope
- Producers: Jas Shaw, James Ford

Simian Mobile Disco chronology
| Attack Decay Sustain Release (2007) | Simian Mobile Disco EP (2007) |

Professional ratings
Aggregate scores
| Source | Rating |
|---|---|
| Metacritic | 73/100 |
Review scores
| Source | Rating |
| AllMusic | 4.5/5 stars |
| Alternative Press | 4/5 stars |
| The A.V. Club | B− |
| The Boston Phoenix | 3/4 stars |
| Entertainment Weekly | B |
| The Guardian | 2/5 stars |
| MusicOMH | 4/5 stars |
| NME | 8/10 |
| Pitchfork | 8.4/10 |
| Spin | 3.5/5 stars |

Attack Decay Sustain Release is the debut album from Simian Mobile Disco. It was released on 18 June 2007 on Wichita Recordings and reached #59 in the UK album charts.

== History ==
The title of the album is a reference to the ADSR envelope, a component of many synthesizers, samplers, and other electronic musical instruments the function of which is to modulate some aspect of the instrument's sound—often its volume—over time.

Five of the album's ten tracks ("Hustler", "Tits & Acid", "I Believe", "Hotdog" and lead single "It's The Beat") were available prior to the album's release.

A double-disc version of the album contains six alternate versions on a separate CD.

Initial copies bought from Rough Trade Shops came with a bonus 4-track rarities CD.

== Legacy ==
The Swedish heavy metal band Ghost covered "I Believe" for their Popestar EP, which consisted mainly of covers.

== Track listing ==
All tracks are written by J. Shaw and J. Ford except noted.

Original track listing
| No. | Title | Writer(s) | Length |
|---|---|---|---|
| 1. | "Sleep Deprivation" | | 4:59 |
| 2. | "I Got This Down" | | 4:09 |
| 3. | "It's the Beat" | Shaw; Ford; Ninja | 3:22 |
| 4. | "Hustler" | Shaw; Ford; Johnson | 3:42 |
| 5. | "Tits & Acid" | | 4:03 |
| 6. | "I Believe" | Shaw; Ford; Lord | 3:18 |
| 7. | "Hotdog" | Shaw; Ford; Ninja | 3:16 |
| 8. | "Wooden" | | 3:50 |
| 9. | "Love" | Shaw; Ford; B. Dobbin | 3:02 |
| 10. | "Scott" | | 3:12 |

U.S. bonus tracks
| No. | Title | Length |
|---|---|---|
| 11. | "Clock" |
| 12. | "System" |

Bonus CD track listing
| No. | Title | Length |
|---|---|---|
| 1. | "I Got This Down" (instrumental version) |
| 2. | "It's the Beat" (Dube for Annie Mac) |
| 3. | "Hustler" (club version) |
| 4. | "I Believe" (SMD Space Dub) |
| 5. | "Hot Dub" |
| 6. | "Wooden" (uncut) |

Rough Trade Shops Bonus CD track listing
| No. | Title | Length |
|---|---|---|
| 1. | "Clock" |
| 2. | "I Believe" (Pinch's "I Believe in Bass Therapy" remix) |
| 3. | "It's the Beat" (Masseymix) |
| 4. | "It's the Eat" |
