= All Hour Cymbals =

Studio album by Yeasayer
- Released: October 23, 2007
- Recorded: 2006—2007
- Genres: Indie rock; worldbeat; neo-psychedelia; indie electronic
- Length: 46:54
- Label: We Are Free
- Producer: Yeasayer

Yeasayer chronology
All Hour Cymbals (2007)	Odd Blood (2010)

All Hour Cymbals is the debut studio album by American indie rock band Yeasayer. It was released by the independent label We Are Free on 23 October 2007, and 24 March 2008 in the UK.

== Reception ==
Professional ratings
Review scores
Source	Rating
AllMusic	4.5/5 stars
The A.V. Club	A
Entertainment Weekly	A−
The Irish Times	4/5 stars
NME	8/10
Pitchfork	7.8/10
The Skinny	4/5 stars
Spin	4/5 stars
Uncut	4/5 stars
XLR8R	8/10

All Hour Cymbals received positive reviews from publications and websites such as Entertainment Weekly, NME, Pitchfork, and Spin. Pitchfork placed it at number 197 on their list of top 200 albums of the 2000s.

As of 2012, sales in the United States have exceeded 55,000 copies, according to Nielsen SoundScan.

== Track listing ==
No.	Title	Length
1.	"Sunrise"	4:07
2.	"Wait for the Summer"	4:53
3.	"2080"	5:24
4.	"Germs"	3:13
5.	"Ah, Weir"	1:21
6.	"No Need to Worry"	5:26
7.	"Forgiveness"	3:40
8.	"Wait for the Wintertime"	4:52
9.	"Worms"	4:07
10.	"Waves"	4:57
11.	"Red Cave" (hidden track)	4:59
