= Odd Blood =

Studio album by Yeasayer
- Released: February 8, 2010
- Recorded: 2009
- Studios: Jersville Studio (Woodstock, New York); Great City Productions (New York City, New York)
- Genres: Indie rock; neo-psychedelia; indie electronic; experimental rock
- Length: 39:36
- Label: Secretly Canadian
- Producer: Yeasayer

Yeasayer chronology
All Hour Cymbals (2007)	Odd Blood (2010)	Fragrant World (2012)

Singles from Odd Blood
- 1. "Ambling Alp" Released: November 3, 2009; 2. "O.N.E." Released: March 23, 2010; 3. "Madder Red" Released: September 13, 2010; 4. "I Remember" Released: February 14, 2011

Accompanying artwork
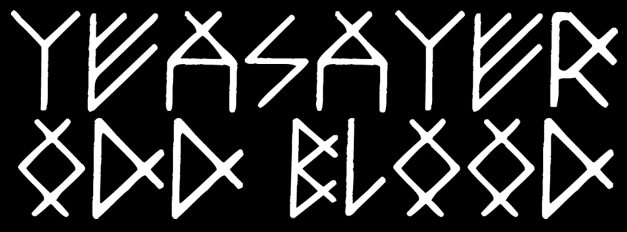
- Typography

Odd Blood is the second studio album by American indie rock band Yeasayer, released on February 8, 2010, in Europe and a day later in North America, with Secretly Canadian as the primary label. The album was recorded and self-produced by the band themselves in the state of New York during 2009. "Ambling Alp", "O.N.E.", "Madder Red", and "I Remember" were released as singles. Odd Blood peaked at number 63 on the US Billboard 200 and at number 64 on the UK Albums Chart. It reached number five on the US Billboard Independent Albums chart. Yeasayer followed the record's release with an extended tour throughout 2010.

Odd Blood was mostly crafted with engineer Steve Revitte in a secluded cabin studio. During the sessions, Yeasayer experimented with different types of instruments and recording machines. Auxiliary musicians were hired to help with the process. The idea was to marry sonic experimentation with pop structures, while primary songwriters Chris Keating and Anand Wilder explored a variety of themes such as boxing, addiction, and paranoia. Odd Blood also contains several love songs. The album received largely positive reviews from critics; "O.N.E" was the 28th track in Pitchfork's Top 100 Tracks of 2010. Praise centered on its cohesive merging of genres, especially the pop-influenced rhythms.

== Origins and recording ==
Yeasayer's prior debut studio album, All Hour Cymbals, was released in 2007 by independent label We Are Free. The band followed its success by co-headlining a tour with synthpop duo MGMT and by part-producing and playing bass guitar on Bat for Lashes' Two Suns in 2009. The same year, a new Yeasayer track, "Tightrope", was used in Red Hot Organization's Dark Was the Night compilation in support of HIV/AIDS sufferers, while vocalist and keyboardist Chris Keating sang and co-wrote Simian Mobile Disco's single "Audacity of Huge", from the band's electronic record Temporary Pleasure.

Backed by the label Secretly Canadian and a larger recording budget, Yeasayer started work on a second studio album in February 2009. The band traveled to Woodstock in upstate New York and rented the country home of percussionist Jerry Marotta, converted into Jersville Studio. Keating was joined by guitarist and keyboardist Anand Wilder, bassist Ira Wolf Tuton, and engineer Steve Revitte, but not All Hour Cymbals drummer Luke Fasano. According to a Rolling Stone article, Odd Blood was inspired by a trip to New Zealand, where Yeasayer experimented with LSD. Keating claimed that the band intended to "sonically challenge Rihanna in the clubs", with an emphasis on bass, while Wilder has said that the band tried to make "a poppier album".

Pop was a word we were throwing around, like "What does it mean to make pop music?" And it was our version of that. There's a difference between being a "pop star" and trying to make an album that has a dialogue with some of the music that pop stars make.

— Chris Keating, on Yeasayer's methods during the recording of Odd Blood

Yeasayer wanted a recording place close to Brooklyn, but removed from it. The band members aimed to streamline their songwriting processes by only doing what things were necessary in whatever parts without embellishing with long songs. According to Revitte, nobody was "married to anything" and minute things like vocal lines were recorded and rerecorded until done right. Sometimes whole sections were redone from scratch. The engineer also helped the band with advice about what other groups their evolving work sounded like. Yeasayer created music in the context of thinking about the music they liked, including interesting works from contemporaries. The aim was to craft pop songs unapologetically and embrace the genre as much as possible. Wilder has noted that Keating singing lead vocals gives songs an added extra as he has "a true pop voice", while he and Tuton do not.

== Promotion and release ==
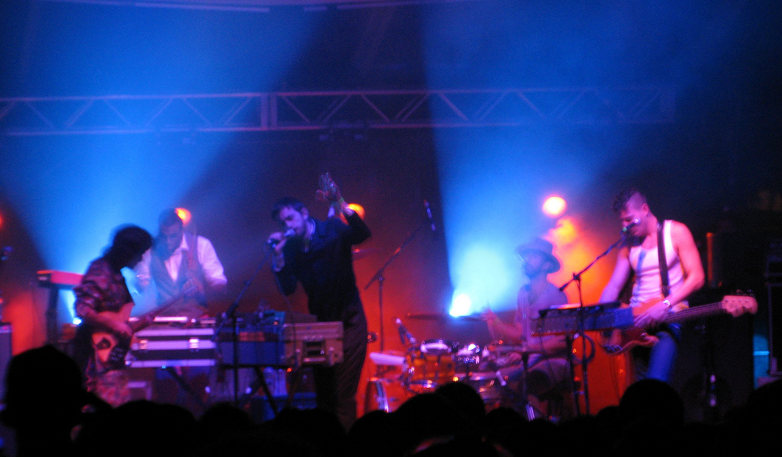
Yeasayer on stage with auxiliary percussionists Jason Trammell and Ahmed Gallab at the 2009 Fun Fun Fun Fest in Austin, Texas

After the Woodstock sessions, Yeasayer undertook a summer 2009 US tour. On October 30, the band made a new track, "Ambling Alp", available for free online streaming and confirmed the Odd Blood track list and release details for 2010. On November 3, 2009, Yeasayer previewed material from the album at the Guggenheim Museum in New York City, while "Ambling Alp" was released as a promotional single digitally and on a limited 12" vinyl edition. Odd Blood tracks were also previewed at the Fun Fun Fun Fest in Austin, Texas, on November 7. Acknowledging the full album's Internet leak, Yeasayer posted a Twitter status on December 10 that read "Presents are always spoiled for those who open them before they are supposed to". The cover art for Odd Blood was revealed the following day, a stylized bust design by artist Benjamin Phelan based on the vision of "a future with a distorted biology"; the chest portion is "sculpted from virtual clay" with a force feedback motion-capture device. The back cover features another Phelan work, a human head with no features apart from two computer nodes as eyes, while the gatefold sleeve and the inserted booklet and CD contain other designs and light sculpture photographs from the artist.

On January 15–16, Odd Blood preview listening parties were organized across selected US independent record stores, where promotional vinyl copies could be purchased. "O.N.E.", the second single from the album, become available for free download on January 27, 2010, with an official March 23 release as a single also announced. The first pre-orders of Odd Blood were taken on January 29, which included a free exclusive package of a "die cut pin and shirt". On February 2, the album was posted in its entirety as a stream on Yeasayer's MySpace page, while the band's February 5 concert at the Natural History Museum in Los Angeles was webcast live. Odd Blood was released in Europe through Mute Records on February 8, and a day later in North America by Secretly Canadian; the album's mail distribution in the latter region was delayed by a blizzard. The name was chosen after the band had a brainstorming session, where Keating wanted a strong title like Blood while Wilder aimed for something more offbeat like Coca-Cola or The King of Queens. Yeasayer followed the album's release with an extensive tour of Europe and North America until November 2010.

As of 2012, sales in the United States have exceeded 80,000 copies, according to Nielsen SoundScan.

== Content ==
=== Lyrics ===
Yeasayer's two main lyricists, Keating and Wilder, shared writing duties for the 10 songs on Odd Blood. Keating, whose grandfather was a boxer in the late 1930s and early 1940s, was inspired to write "Ambling Alp" after reading about American boxer Joe Louis. The track's title comes from the nickname of one of Louis' adversaries, Italian Primo Carnera, while the lyrics, including the lines "Stick up for yourself son / Never mind what anybody else done", are from the perspective of Louis' father. Keating wrote "I Remember" as a love song about a woman—later to be his wife—he met and kissed on a plane; he has noted that for the time he overcame his fear of flying. "Mondegreen" is Keating's attempt to mix the late 1970s drug-fueled paranoia of David Bowie with the current 24-hour news cycle and "the sort of absurd, psychotic rants" of Fox newscasters Glenn Beck and Sean Hannity.

"Madder Red"
Inspired by John Lennon's "Jealous Guy", "Madder Red" is about a weak man who likes to gamble. The track was created by Wilder as an acoustic folk lullaby, to which Keating added a prominent beat.

For his first track on Odd Blood, "Madder Red", Wilder wrote a song in the vein of John Lennon's "Jealous Guy", "about being a weak man, a gambler". The first lines which begin with "Even when my luck is down" are borrowed from a Celtic book of verse. In "O.N.E.", the lyricist tackled the issue of addiction, specifically alcoholism, but related it "to a way you'd get rid of a girlfriend". According to Wilder, the subject matter of "Grizelda" is drug lord Griselda Blanco. It was written after Yeasayer watched Cocaine Cowboys, a film about the violent Miami cocaine industry. The song is a fictional account of the film's main interviewee, a former hitman of Blanco's, who is writing her a letter in which he is both scared and in love following her extradition to Colombia.

=== Composition ===
Odd Blood is built around sonic experimentation with different genres and synthetic musical elements. Yeasayer tried to commit to certain styles for an entire song and "not jump around". Opener "The Children" is an electronically manipulated song created with the extensive use of subwoofers. The band members sang its harmonies through a fan and used pitch shifters and were determined to have the song as the first track, especially because Keating liked the idea of starting the album as "a departure point" from the last "very choral" song on All Hour Cymbals. Pitch shifting is also used on "Ambling Alp", first created as an instrumental demo by Tuton. Using a Harmonic Octave Generator effects pedal, he made his arpeggiated bass guitar notes sound like a flute's acoustic output. Keating then sampled the solo and built a song around it; his a cappella singing was recorded both conventionally in a booth and in the studio's basement with a distant miking scheme inspired by David Bowie's 1977 album "Heroes". The influence of "dewy-eyed" 1980s bands like Erasure and Orchestral Manoeuvres in the Dark was observed elsewhere on the album.

The third track on Odd Blood, "Madder Red", was conceived as a "quiet, folky, acoustic lullaby" by Wilder. Once the basic opening structure was in place, Keating decided to add a "heavy beat" on top, which changed the feel of the song. The vocalist created "I Remember" himself in his basement with a similar recording setup to All Hour Cymbals. Using a damaged Nord keyboard, he played "weird sounds" that were interesting together. Impressed with the track's tone, the rest of the band decided not to amend the demo too much. A live version was first recorded before being doubled in length, a "four-and-a-half-minute-long mixtape love ballad". "I Remember" is followed by "O.N.E.", created when Wilder was exploring the idea of a song that included more than one chord. The guitarist played a long riff of about 16 bars with different chords before adding "a big beat" over it. The track was trialled at different festivals, after which Yeasayer decided to keep its live "funkier vibe". For "Love Me Girl", Wilder used loops to evoke the emotions in the final scene of the movie Trainspotting—in which a character finds a sum of money in a locker—followed by an R&B style similar to Justin Timberlake's. The song's melody was created using an acoustic guitar and MIDI notes on computer program GarageBand, to which synthetic elements and a dancehall-type beat were then added.

The seventh track on Odd Blood, "Rome", features beats taken from Moroccan and Syrian dance music that Keating's wife had on her iPod, while for "Strange Reunions", Yeasayer created a short song under three minutes by exploring unconventional time signatures in different parts in the style of fellow New York City band Dirty Projectors. "Mondegreen" follows and is an old song created by Keating using samplers plugged into a television set. Using four channels which showed programs like infomercials and soap operas, he recorded four banks of sound and structured a song by singing on top of the material. The last track, "Grizelda", is, according to Tuton, "a nice way to close an album. It lulls you into sitting back in your chair, puts you in a trance a bit, although the subject matter might be a bit dark."

== Critical reception ==
Professional ratings
Aggregate scores
Source	Rating
AnyDecentMusic?	7.5/10
Metacritic	78/100
Review scores
Source	Rating
AllMusic	4/5 stars
The A.V. Club	A−
Chicago Tribune	3/4 stars
The Guardian	4/5 stars
Los Angeles Times	3.5/4 stars
NME	8/10
Pitchfork	6.1/10
Q	4/5 stars
Rolling Stone	4/5 stars
Spin	8/10

Media response to Odd Blood was generally favorable; aggregating website Metacritic reports a normalized rating of 78 out of 100 based on 36 critical reviews. Greg Kot of the Chicago Tribune described Yeasayer's new material as a consolidation of the work on All Hour Cymbals into "a series of shapely pop songs"; he stated, "The album aims for pleasure rather than introspection, and most of the time, it hits the mark." Summing it up as "both odd and bloody marvelous", Will Dean of The Guardian labeled Odd Blood "a masterclass in modern, multicultural, weirdo pop music". Will Hermes of Rolling Stone commented that, like fellow Brooklyn bands Dirty Projectors and Animal Collective, Yeasayer are "pioneers of a scene that refuses to choose between a sense of experimental adventure and pure pop pleasure", while AllMusic's Andrew Leahey noted that the record is "a thinking man's album, one that requires its listeners to put on their thinking caps as well as their dancing shoes". Zach Schonfeld of PopMatters praised the album's "jungle-dense beats and rainbow synths" and wrote that Yeasayer "avoided the sophomore slump the only way they know how: by fearlessly dismantling everything that made their debut a safe bet." Josh Modell of Spin concluded, "So, two exciting questions: Where did this come from, and what's coming next?"

Todd Martens of Los Angeles Times stated that Odd Blood "ultimately reveals that beneath all the weird sounds, tribal harmonies and otherworldly textures, Yeasayer are still a bunch of indie-rock sentimentalists", while Tim Chester of NME wrote that the album is "a musical package holiday you can take vicariously". Although conceding that it "should appeal to a lot of people", Pitchfork's Scott Plagenhoef was less receptive and suggested that the "overfed production and search for direction" often lead to "a bit too much of not enough". Amanda Farah of Clash explained that Odd Blood is "an unabashed pop record that anyone should be proud to play at full volume", while Paul Terefenko of NOW concluded, "Who'd have thought the psych-folk pile, already teetering on the brink of over-saturation, would peak with Yeasayer's second album?" Odd Blood figured highly in several end-of-year best album lists for 2010, notably, at number five by American Songwriter, at number eight by Time and by Drowned in Sound, at number nine by One Thirty BPM, at number 11 by Under the Radar, at number 12 by Spin, at number 14 by The Guardian, and at number 15 by NME and Q. In October 2011, NME placed "O.N.E" at number 90 on its list of "150 Best Tracks of the Past 15 Years".

== Track listing ==
All songs written and composed by Yeasayer.

No.	Title	Length
1.	"The Children"	3:12
2.	"Ambling Alp"	3:55
3.	"Madder Red"	4:03
4.	"I Remember"	4:23
5.	"O.N.E."	5:23
6.	"Love Me Girl"	5:00
7.	"Rome"	3:48
8.	"Strange Reunions"	2:35
9.	"Mondegreen"	4:37
10.	"Grizelda"	2:40
Total length:		39:36

Japan edition bonus tracks
No.	Title	Length
11.	"Ambling Alp" (Memory Tapes Remix)	3:52
12.	"Ambling Alp" (DJ /rupture Remix)
13.	"O.N.E." (XXXChange Remix)	4:44
14.	"O.N.E." (Demo)	5:55

2011 deluxe edition CD 2
No.	Title	Length
1.	"Ambling Alp" (DJ /rupture & Brent Arnold Remix)	4:01
2.	"Ambling Alp" (Memory Tapes Remix)	3:52
3.	"O.N.E." (Demo)	5:55
4.	"O.N.E." (XXXChange Remix)	4:44
5.	"Madder Red" (The Golden Filter Remix)	7:33
6.	"Madder Red" (Henning Fürst Remix)	4:45

== Personnel ==
Those involved in the making of Odd Blood are:

Yeasayer

- Chris Keating – vocals, keyboards
- Anand Wilder – guitars, vocals, keyboards
- Ira Wolf Tuton – bass guitar, backing vocals

Additional musicians

- Jason Trammell – drums
- Ahmed Gallab – timbales, electronic percussion
- Jerry Marotta – drums, Taos drums, percussion
- Kevin Bewersdorf – piano, synthesizers
- Stuart Bogie – horns, bass harmonica, jaw harp
- Steven Stetson – horns

Production

- Yeasayer – producers
- Steve Revitte – recording, engineering
- Britt Myers – recording, engineering, mixing
- Jake Aron – additional engineering
- Todd Brozman – mixing assistant
- Jay Culliton – mixing assistant
- Geoff Vincent – mixing assistant
- Chris Gehringer – mastering

Design

- Chris Keating – art direction
- Benjamin Phelan – artwork, light sculptures
- Daniel Murphy – layout

== Charts ==
Chart performance for Odd Blood
Chart (2010)	Peak position
Australian Albums (ARIA)	66
Belgian Albums (Ultratop Flanders)	56
Dutch Albums (Album Top 100)	43
Irish Albums (IRMA)	64
Norwegian Albums (VG-lista)	14
Scottish Albums (Official Charts)	81
Swedish Albums (Sverigetopplistan)	47
UK Albums Chart	64
US Billboard 200	63
US Billboard Tastemaker Albums	6
US Billboard Independent Albums	5
US Billboard Alternative Albums	8
US Billboard Rock Albums	13
