= Fragrant World =

Studio album by Yeasayer
- Released: August 21, 2012
- Genre: Experimental rock, psychedelic pop
- Length: 48:21
- Label: Secretly Canadian
- Producer: Yeasayer

Yeasayer chronology
Odd Blood (2010)	Fragrant World (2012)	Amen & Goodbye (2016)

Singles from Fragrant World
- 1. "Henrietta" Released: May 25, 2012; 2. "Longevity" Released: June 22, 2012; 3. "Reagan's Skeleton" Released: November 23, 2012

Professional ratings
Review scores
Source	Rating
AllMusic	3.5/5 stars
Consequence of Sound	C−
The Guardian	3/5 stars
Pitchfork	5.4/10
Tiny Mix Tapes	3/5 stars

Fragrant World is the third studio album by American psychedelic pop band Yeasayer, released on August 21, 2012, on Secretly Canadian.

== Critical reception ==
The album has received a provisional score of 71 from Metacritic indicating "generally favorable reviews", based on the reviews of 44 critics.

== Track listing ==
No.	Title	Length
1.	"Fingers Never Bleed"	4:29
2.	"Longevity"	3:09
3.	"Blue Paper"	5:06
4.	"Henrietta"	4:39
5.	"Devil and the Deed"	3:36
6.	"No Bones"	3:08
7.	"Reagan's Skeleton"	5:04
8.	"Demon Road"	4:11
9.	"Damaged Goods"	4:57
10.	"Folk Hero Shtick"	4:38
11.	"Glass of the Microscope"	5:24
Total length:		48:21

== Personnel ==
=== Yeasayer ===
- Chris Keating – lead vocals (1, 2, 4, 6, 7, 8 and 11), backing vocals (3, 5, 9 and 10), Maschine synth (1, 3, 4, 5, 6, 9, 10 and 11), drum programming (2, 3, 4, 6 and 8), synthesizer (2, 4, 5 and 8) , Jupiter (7)
- Anand Wilder – lead vocals (3, 5, 9 and 10), backing vocals (1, 2, 4, 6, 7, 8 and 11), guitar (1, 4, 8, 9 and 11), piano (1), Nord (1), Juno 106 (3, 4, 9 and 10), Jupiter MKS-80 (3), Korg MS-20 (3), Farfisa (3), Boss Supershifter (3), organ (4), cello (5), drum programming (5), Electribe (6), synthesizer (6), trident piano (7), ARP Omni 2 (7), talk box (8), celeste (9), 12-string guitar (10), Rhodes (10), mellotron (10)
- Ira Wolf Tuton – J bass (2, 4, 5, 7, 9, 10 and 11), backing vocals (1, 2, 3, 4, 5, 8, 9 and 10), melodyne vocals (1), Omnisphere (9 and 10), Harmonic Octave Generator (4), Roland SH-2 (5), bass synthesizer (6), Roland SH-101 (7), ARP 2600 (7), tambourine (7), Moog Murf (9), piano (10)

=== Additional musicians ===
- Jason Trammell – drums (2, 4 and 7), percussion (6), MPC (11)
- Ahmed Gallab – percussion (6)
- Brian McOmber – drums (2, 4 and 9), percussion (9)
- Dan Carey – MPC (3 and 5)
- Al Carlson – melodyne (4), saxophone (10)
- Kishi Bashi – strings (2)
- "Delicate" Steve Marion – guitar (3)
- Elliot Bergman – kalimba (5)

=== Recording personnel ===
- Yeasayer – producer
- Al Carlson – recording
- Abe Seiferth – additional recording
- Alexis Smith – engineer
- Dan Carey – mixing

=== Artwork ===
- Ana Maria Lucaciu – modeling
- Jason Nocito – photography
- Other Means – design

== Charts ==
Chart performance for Fragrant World
Chart (2012)	Peak position
Australian Albums (ARIA)	47
Belgian Albums (Ultratop Flanders)	25
Dutch Albums (Album Top 100)	67
German Albums (Offizielle Top 100)	98
Scottish Albums (OCC)	100
Swiss Albums (Schweizer Hitparade)	76
UK Albums (OCC)	82
US Billboard 200	44
