= Yeasayer =

American experimental rock band from Brooklyn, New York

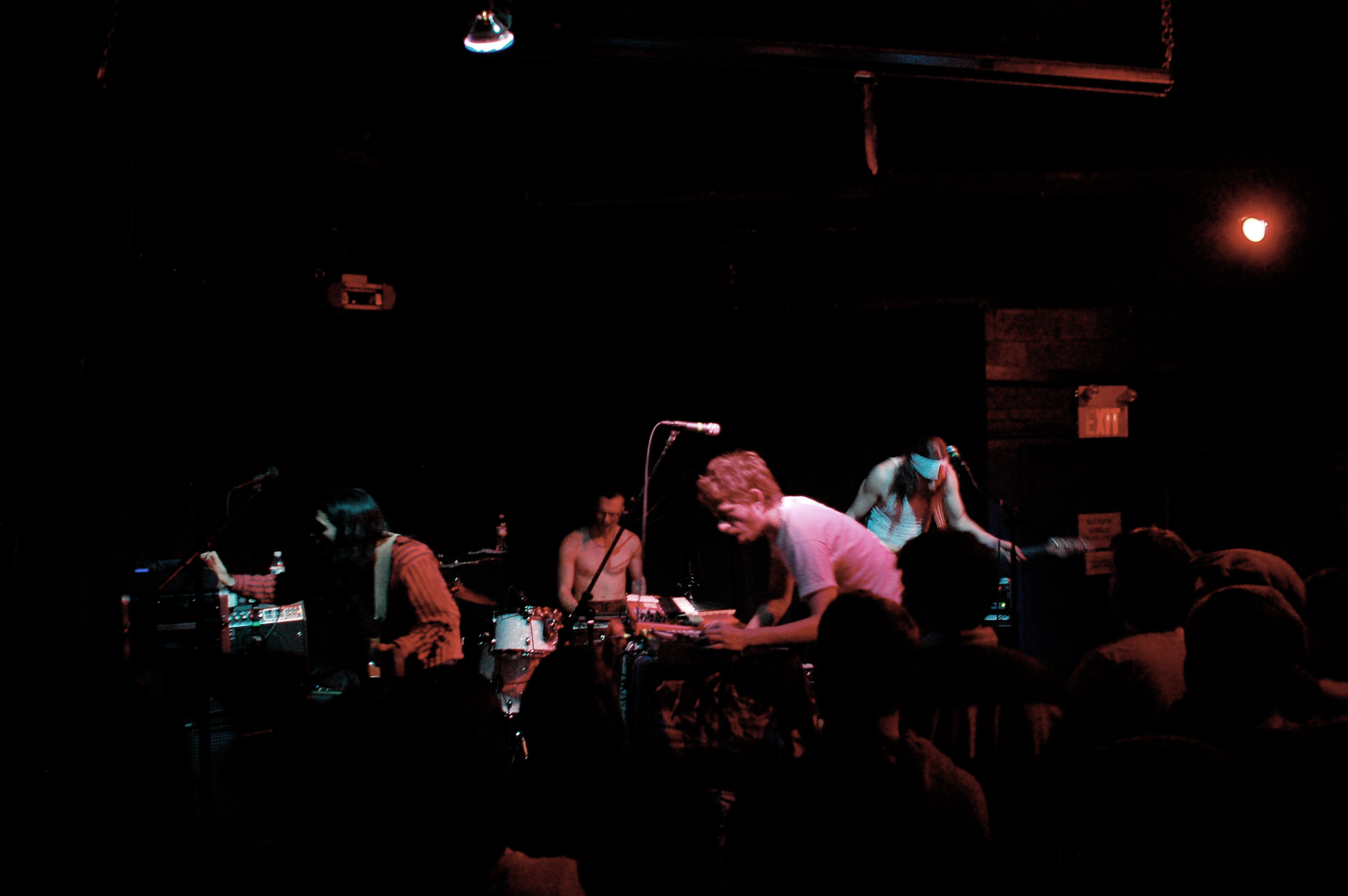
- Yeasayer in 2008

Background information
- Origin: Brooklyn, New York, U.S.
- Genres: Indie rock; neo-psychedelia; indie electronic
- Years active: 2006–2019
- Labels: Secretly Canadian, Mute Records, Yeasayer Records
- Past members: Chris Keating; Ira Wolf Tuton; Anand Wilder; Luke Fasano; Jason Trammell; Ahmed Gallab; Cale Parks
- Website: yeasayer.band

Yeasayer (/ˈjeɪseɪ.ər/) was an American indie rock band from Brooklyn, New York, formed in 2006 and disbanded in 2019. The band consisted of Chris Keating, Ira Wolf Tuton, and Anand Wilder. They announced their split on December 19, 2019.

== History ==
=== Formation ===
The band's three core members, Chris Keating (born 1981 or 1982), Ira Wolf Tuton (born 1979 or 1980), and Anand Wilder (born 1982 or 1983), first came to attention after appearing at the SXSW festival in early 2007. Keating and Wilder had previously met and begun performing together while in high school, at the Park School of Baltimore (the alma mater of fellow experimental musicians Animal Collective).

Chris Keating attended Rhode Island School of Design (RISD), graduating from the Film, Animation, Video department in 2004. While attending RISD, Keating started experimenting in playing a new type of musical sound. He reached out to Anand Wilder and they started playing music together again, eventually forming the band.

=== All Hour Cymbals ===
Keating and Wilder both served as lead vocalists and principal songwriters and the band produced the songs together as a unit. Wilder, who began playing cello when he was four, described their songwriting styles to Pitchfork: "When I write a song, I'm always thinking of the harmonies; for me the song doesn't really exist without the harmonies. For example, Forgiveness would be a really boring melody without the choir behind it. Chris resisted any formal musical training, but his sense of melody and songcraft is just astounding."

Their first single consisted of a double A-side of the tracks "Sunrise" and "2080." Both songs appeared on their debut album All Hour Cymbals, which was released in October 2007 via We Are Free. The band has self described their sound as "Middle Eastern-psych-snap-gospel." Wilder has referenced influences including "Bollywood soundtracks from the 70s, Mapfumo records, and Celtic music." Many critics described the album as having "spiritual" influences. Wilder expanded on this in an interview, stating: "When you lack any specific religion, you become open to all sorts of religious music. And I think everyone can agree that some of the most beautiful music ever written was done so in the name of God or gods."

While supporting their debut album, the band became well known for their live performances, which often include psychedelic visuals. In 2008, Yeasayer toured with MGMT and Man Man and supported Beck. The same year they performed a public a cappella concert, "Take Away Show", on the Paris metro. The band also played at Lollapalooza, the Pitchfork Music Festival, the Austin City Limits Festival, Bonnaroo, Sasquatch! Music Festival, and the Reading and Leeds Festivals. In 2009, Yeasayer contributed "Tightrope" to the AIDS benefit album Dark Was the Night produced by the Red Hot Organization.

=== Odd Blood ===
Backed by labels Secretly Canadian and Mute Records, Yeasayer released their second studio album, Odd Blood, in February 2010, featuring more pop music influences than earlier work. The band addressed the changes sonically in an in depth interview with The Quietus, with Wolf Tuton stating: "I think the similar influences are there, but we have not focused on the same tones. We also wanted to focus on 90s dance music and production-wise get the low end thumping a little bit better. We also wanted to be more concise with our song writing and arrangement." Keating continued, "The first album was such a wall of noise and we couldn’t do anymore with it so we tried to strip it away ... Creatively it was a departure and it was a challenge to try and do it and simplify ... it was ... fun to try and not hide behind the haze."

In February 2010, Yeasayer first appeared on the cover of The FADER in its 66th issue.

The album was well received critically and commercially, with high placements on several notable year end best album lists including Time, Spin, and Under the Radar. In January 2011, The Hype Machine named Yeasayer the most blogged artist of 2010. Songs from Odd Blood were featured on several TV shows and films, including 90210, America's Next Top Model, The Good Wife, and the 2012 film Pitch Perfect.

The music videos for both "Ambling Alp" and "O.N.E" were created by directing duo Radical Friend. The song was also featured in FIFA 11 soundtrack.

The band toured extensively behind Odd Blood, with appearances at several major festivals, including Coachella Music Festival, the Dutch Pinkpop and Lowlands festival, Latitude Festival in England, and the Australian music festival Splendour in the Grass, where they were asked by the organizers of Laneway Festival to return and play in 2011.

In April 2011, Yeasayer released End Blood in participation with Record Store Day which the band described as "two ideas that didn't fit on Odd Blood".

=== Fragrant World ===
In May 2011, the band premiered their brand new song "Devil and the Deed" on Conan O'Brien's late night talk show. During their subsequent tour of North America, the band played this song at shows along with two other new tunes, "Demon Road" and "Henrietta". All three of these songs appeared on the final track listing for the band's next album.

On August 21, 2012, Yeasayer released Fragrant World. The band leaked the album version of "Henrietta" directly to 200 random fans by mailing them physical CDs. On where the inspiration for leaking the single directly to fans rather than via traditional channels came from, Keating stated: "I think #1, it's hard to do something secretive in the oversharing, Instagramming culture that we live in, so I liked the idea of a musical object you send to people ... I was actually interested to see if no one would share it at all. I thought that would be really cool. But I guess that doesn't happen anymore. Like 10 seconds after the first dude got the first envelope, I think he was in Belgium or the Netherlands or something, that guy was sharing it, and there it goes." The rest of the album was leaked via an online scavenger hunt where the band gave fans clues as to where each song and an accompanying visual directed by Yoshi Sodeoka could be found. To further promote the album, Yeasayer performed single "Longevity" on Late Night with Jimmy Fallon the night before its commercial release.

In much the same way that Odd Blood was a departure from All Hour Cymbals, Fragrant World saw the band continuing to expand their sound. According to Wolf Tuton, while Odd Blood featured pop influences, Fragrant World deliberately shied away from them: "If the tone of something veered too closely to a random pop song or to something on our previous records, we’d immediately steer it in a different direction. It’s easy to swerve back into your comfort zone without even realizing it, so we were very conscious of trying to stay away from that and take this into some different sonic direction." Wilder confirmed this, stating: "The music, the rhythms are a little bit more abstract. We allowed ourselves to experiment more, not really worrying about making the most catchy, anthemic pop songs for the Lollapalooza crowd ... We definitely wanted it to be a little bit darker than the last record."

Although the band began the touring before the album's formal release, the set list for shows during this cycle consisted of many tracks from Fragrant World. The band worked to rearrange older songs so that they would fit better in the set, with Keating saying the main thing the band asked themselves in rehearsals was "What could we do to make an obvious change but still preserve the integrity of the song, and to give the song new life not just for us but also for the audience?" The band partnered with Casey Reas and The Creators Project to develop an interactive set for the Fragrant World tour. The set consisted of mirrored prism-like structures that "utilize[d] elements of reflection and refraction to produce an immersive, multi-layered experience that ... subsume[d] audiences in color and light."

On June 21, 2013, the band posted a message on their Facebook page that they were going to be working on their fourth album after the end of the summer. Wilder later confirmed this in a July 2013 interview, stating that the band had already started writing and plans to enter the studio this winter.

On November 12, 2013, the band released Good Evening, Washington D.C., a collection of live tracks recorded at the 9:30 Club.

=== Amen & Goodbye ===
On January 7, 2016, the band announced that they would release their album called Amen & Goodbye on April 1, 2016. They also released a video for the song "I Am Chemistry".

On February 10, 2016, Yeasayer released a music video that explored the set on which the album art was shot, as well as new single "Prophecy Gun." The music video included sculptures of public figures such as Donald Trump, Caitlyn Jenner, and Mark Twain, and was described by the band as "Sgt. Pepper meets Hieronymous Bosch meets Dali meets Pee-Wee's Playhouse."

On March 2, 2016, the band released the third single "Silly Me," a track with a decidedly more pop inspired sound described by the trio as being "from a different spectrum."

=== Erotic Reruns ===
On April 10, 2019, the band announced their fifth album Erotic Reruns. The album was released on June 7, 2019, via their own Yeasayer Records.

=== Split ===
The band announced it had split via its social media accounts on December 19, 2019, with the statement: “We have decided that Yeasayer has reached its end.”

== Influences ==
Yeasayer's leader Chris Keating stated he got "a lot of inspiration and lyrics from books that I've read, poetry, or lines from a movie. Art is a constant back and forth, everyone is responding to someone else. Every song that you think is an original idea, someday you’re going to come across something in a children’s book that has the exact words you heard in your favorite song on the radio. Art is constantly curating this vast history of music, art and literature." Keating has cited as other music genres and artists that inspired him, Mystikal, Siouxsie and the Banshees, Talk Talk, Dead Can Dance and classical music.

== Discography ==
- All Hour Cymbals (2007)
- Odd Blood (2010)
- Fragrant World (2012)
- Amen & Goodbye (2016)
- Erotic Reruns (2019)
