= Black Tide discography =

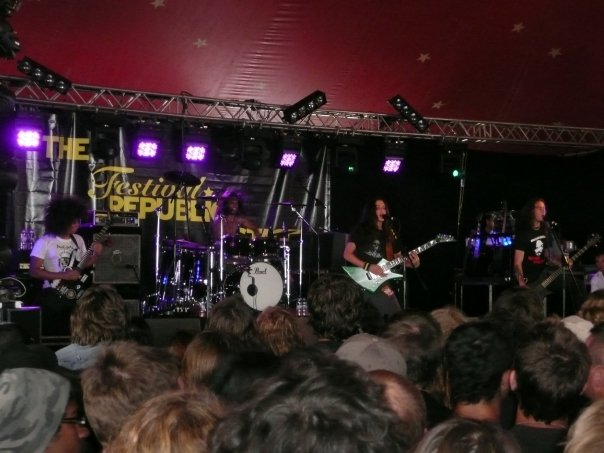
- Black Tide live at the Reading Festival 2008
- Studio albums: 3
- Extended plays: 3
- Singles: 7
- Music videos: 10

Black Tide is a heavy metal band formed in Miami, Florida in 2004 by lead guitarist and vocalist Gabriel Garcia. In 2008, the band released their debut album Light from Above which charted at number 73 on the Billboard 200, with 11,400 copies sold in its first week of sales. It spawned the successful single "Shockwave". After touring with bands like Avenged Sevenfold and Bullet for My Valentine, the band released the single "Bury Me". Their second album, Post Mortem, was released in August 2011. It charted at number 73 on the Billboard 200.

== Studio albums ==
Year	Album details	Peak chart positions	
Year	Album details	US	UK
2008	Light from Above: Released: March 18, 2008; Label: Interscope; Format: CD	73	194
2011	Post Mortem: Released: August 23, 2011; Label: Interscope; Format: CD	73	—
2015	Chasing Shadows: Released: October 16, 2015; Label: Pavement Entertainment, Inc.; Format: CD	—	—

== Extended plays ==
Year	Album details	Notes
2008	Road Warrior: Released: 2008; Label: Interscope; Format: 7-inch	It features a live recording of the song "Warriors of Time" from their debut album Light from Above and a cover of Iron Maiden's "Prowler".
2011	Al Cielo EP: Released: October 8, 2011; Label: Interscope; Format: Digital Download	It features Spanish re-recordings of three songs from Post Mortem, all with alternative names.
2012	Just Another Drug: Released: August 21, 2012; Label:Self-Released; Format: Digital Download	A four-song EP self-released exclusively through iTunes.
2013	Bite the Bullet: Released: November 12, 2013; Label: InnerCat Music Group, LLC; Format: Digital Download	The first release by the band without drummer Steven Spence.

== Singles ==
Year	Song	US Main.	Album
2007	"Shockwave"	25	Light from Above
2008	"Warriors of Time"	—	Light from Above
2008	"Shout"	—	Light from Above
2010	"Bury Me"	—	Post Mortem
2010	"Honest Eyes"	—	Post Mortem
2011	"Walking Dead Man"	—	Post Mortem
2011	"That Fire"	20	Post Mortem

== Music videos ==
Year	Song	Director
2007	"Shockwave (Ozzfest Version)"	
2008	"Shockwave"	Travis Kopach
2008	"Show Me The Way"	
2009	"Warriors of Time"	Unknown
2009	"Shout"	Travis Kopach
2011	"Walking Dead Man"	P. R. Brown
2011	"That Fire"	P. R. Brown
2012	"Ashes"	
2013	"Not Afraid"	Unknown
2013	"Can't Get Enough"	Unknown
2015	"Angel in the Dark"	Raul N. Garcia
2026	"The Boys Are Back in Town"	Unknow
2026	"Midgardsormen"	Unknow

== Other appearances ==
Year	Song	Album
2008	"Prowler"	Maiden Heaven: A Tribute to Iron Maiden
