= List of songs in Guitar Hero Live =

Guitar Hero Live logo

Guitar Hero Live is a 2015 music video game developed by FreeStyleGames and published by Activision. It is the first title in the Guitar Hero series since it went on hiatus after 2011, and the first game in the series available for 8th generation video game consoles (PlayStation 4, Wii U, and Xbox One). The game was released worldwide on 20 October 2015 for these systems as well as the PlayStation 3, Xbox 360, and iOS devices including the Apple TV.

The title is considered a reboot of the series; instead of using a five-button guitar-shaped game controller, the game shipped with a six-button controller, arranged in two rows of three aimed to provide more realistic fingering positions than the five-button controller. The game includes 42 songs on the game's disc, presented in sets using full motion video taken from the first-person perspective of the lead guitarist as the background visuals to create an immersive experience. Guitar Hero Live does not use traditional downloadable content to expand the game and is not backward compatible with previous songs from Guitar Hero games. Instead, the game includes the online Guitar Hero TV (GHTV) mode modeled after music video channels that players can jump in or out of at any time, playing through ongoing songs in a curated fashion. GHTV, through in-game rewards and microtransactions, supported the ability to play any song in the library, perform Premium shows where the newest tracks to GHTV could be found, or even unlock all features for a 24-hour period as part of a Party Pass. Two hundred songs were available at the release of the game, with more added over time, averaging about six new songs each week.

FreeStyleGames selected on-disc songs from a wider variety of music genres beyond rock music as to provide challenging guitar tracks for players, while their approach to licensing of songs for GHTV enabled them to attract more musical acts to offer their music. Game reviewers found the on-disc soundtrack to be weak as it focused too much on more recent musical acts, while praising the wider variety across a larger time period that GHTV offered.

== On-disc soundtrack ==
42 songs are featured on disc as part of the game's main "GH Live" career mode. Players progress through the career mode by playing one of several continuous sets of three to five songs, with each set presented as part of a concert performance. During a set, the game shows the note highway, the on-screen fretboard which represents the notes the player should play in time to the music, and other gameplay elements. This is shown atop live-action footage taken from the first-person perspective of the lead guitar player of one of several fictional bands, performing on stage and watching the reaction of the crowd and their bandmates. The live-action footage is manipulated by the game to reflect how well the player is performing. Once the player has completed a set, all songs from that set are available in a quickplay mode, allowing the player to perform a single song at a time which they can use to practice the song or attempt to achieve a better score.

In selecting the on-disc songs, FreeStyleGames recognized that engaging guitar tracks are not strictly limited to rock music, and included other genres into the mix. According to designer Jim Norris, their selection process began with identifying songs that would be expected by players to be on a Guitar Hero title, and then determining which of those songs which they could license. Once they had obtained the license, FreeStyleGames would mark up the song for the note highways and determined how much fun these songs would be to play. Finally, they balanced the song selection in the game to give players a combination of songs they know and those they may not recognize but would be enjoyable.

The table below lists the on-disc songs, including the venue and fictional band that are used in the set where the song is included.

Show/Venue	Band	Artist(s)	Song	Year	Genre
Sounddial: Castle Stage	Broken Tide	The Gaslight Anthem	"45"	2012	Rock
Rock The Block: The Ledges	Yearbook Ghosts	Good Charlotte	"The Anthem"	2002	Rock
Rock The Block: The Ledges	Quantum Freqs	Skrillex	"Bangarang (ft. Sirah)"	2011	Alternative
Rock The Block: Roadblock	Fighthound	Soundgarden	"Been Away Too Long"	2012	Rock
Rock The Block: The Ledges	Quantum Freqs	Eminem	"Berzerk"	2013	Alternative
Sounddial: Fire Pit	Blackout Conspiracy	Of Mice & Men	"Bones Exposed"	2014	Metal
Rock The Block: Strictland Park	The Out-Outs	Rihanna	"California King Bed"	2010	Pop
Rock The Block: The Ledges	Quantum Freqs	Kasabian	"Club Foot"	2004	Alternative
Sounddial: Barn Stage	The Jephson Hangout	OneRepublic	"Counting Stars"	2013	Pop
Sounddial: Barn Stage	The Jephson Hangout	Imagine Dragons	"Demons"	2012	Pop
Rock The Block: The Ledges	Yearbook Ghosts	Neon Trees	"Everybody Talks"	2011	Pop
Rock The Block: Strictland Park	The Jephson Hangout	The 1975	"Girls"	2013	Indie
Sounddial: Castle Stage	Broken Tide	The Black Keys	"Gold on the Ceiling"	2011	Rock
Rock The Block: Strictland Park	The Jephson Hangout	Elbow	"Grounds for Divorce"	2008	Indie
Rock The Block: Strictland Park	The Out-Outs	Avril Lavigne	"Here's to Never Growing Up"	2013	Pop
Sounddial: Barn Stage	Portland Cloud Orchestra	The Lumineers	"Ho Hey"	2012	Indie
Sounddial: Barn Stage	Portland Cloud Orchestra	Mumford & Sons	"I Will Wait"	2012	Indie
Rock The Block: Cactus Joe's	Broken Tide	Rival Sons	"Keep on Swinging"	2012	Rock
Sounddial: Fire Pit	Our Pasts Collide	Thirty Seconds to Mars	"The Kill"	2005	Rock
Sounddial: Fire Pit	Blackout Conspiracy	Pierce the Veil	"King for a Day (ft. Kellin Quinn)"	2012	Metal
Rock The Block: Strictland Park	The Jephson Hangout	Jack White	"Lazaretto"	2014	Rock
Rock The Block: Roadblock	Vivid Screams	Deap Vally	"Lies"	2013	Indie
Sounddial: Castle Stage	Broken Tide	Royal Blood	"Little Monster"	2014	Rock
Sounddial: Fire Pit	Our Pasts Collide	You Me at Six	"Lived a Lie"	2014	Rock
Rock The Block: Roadblock	Vivid Screams	Halestorm	"Love Bites (So Do I)"	2012	Rock
Rock The Block: Roadblock	Fighthound	Pearl Jam	"Mind Your Manners"	2013	Rock
Sounddial: Barn Stage	Portland Cloud Orchestra	Of Monsters and Men	"Mountain Sound"	2012	Indie
Sounddial: Fire Pit	Our Pasts Collide	Fall Out Boy	"My Songs Know What You Did in the Dark (Light Em Up)"	2013	Rock
Rock The Block: Roadblock	Vivid Screams	Paramore	"Now"	2013	Rock
Rock The Block: Roadblock	Fighthound	Green Day	"Nuclear Family"	2012	Rock
Rock The Block: Cactus Joe's	VIP Party	The Rolling Stones	"Paint It Black"	1966	Rock
Rock The Block: Cactus Joe's	Broken Tide	Arctic Monkeys	"R U Mine?"	2013	Indie
Rock The Block: The Ledges	Yearbook Ghosts	Blink-182	"The Rock Show"	2001	Rock
Sounddial: Fire Pit	Blackout Conspiracy	Bring Me the Horizon	"Shadow Moses"	2013	Metal
Rock The Block: Cactus Joe's	Broken Tide	Wolfmother	"Sundial"	2009	Rock
Rock The Block: Cactus Joe's	VIP Party	Queen	"Tie Your Mother Down"	1976	Rock
Sounddial: Castle Stage	Broken Tide	Rise Against	"Tragedy + Time"	2014	Rock
Sounddial: Castle Stage	Broken Tide	Biffy Clyro	"Victory Over the Sun"	2013	Rock
Rock The Block: Strictland Park	The Out-Outs	Katy Perry	"Waking Up in Vegas"	2008	Pop
Rock The Block: The Ledges	Quantum Freqs	Linkin Park	"Wastelands"	2014	Rock
Sounddial: Barn Stage	The Jephson Hangout	The Killers	"When You Were Young"	2006	Rock
Rock The Block: Cactus Joe's	VIP Party	The Who	"Won't Get Fooled Again"	1971	Rock

== GHTV ==
Forgoing the downloadable content model used in previous Guitar Hero games, Guitar Hero Live added songs to the game via Guitar Hero TV (GHTV), an online game mode offered free-of-charge in Guitar Hero Live. Instead of playing the immersive first-person view that the main career mode presents, songs on GHTV were played over the music video or footage of the band playing at a concert. Songs on GHTV were normally offered in a curated rotation, similar to a music video channel, allowing the player to drop in and out, but the player could use collected in-game rewards or microtransactions to play any available song outside of this rotation. FreeStyleGames found that this approach, in contrast to the traditional downloadable content model, made it easier to secure licensing rights with artists to use their songs, as well as a throwback to the heyday of music video channels like MTV.

=== Launch songs ===
Two hundred songs were initially available on GHTV on the game's release on 20 October 2015.

Artist(s)	Song	Year	Genre
Vampire Weekend	"A-Punk"	2008	Indie
Orianthi	"According to You"	2009	Rock
Alter Bridge	"Addicted to Pain"	2013	Metal
Blink-182	"All the Small Things"	1999	Rock
36 Crazyfists	"Also Am I"	2015	Metal
Joe Satriani	"Always with Me, Always with You"	1987	Rock
Green Day	"American Idiot"	2004	Rock
Yelawolf	"American You"	2015	Alternative
The Avett Brothers	"Another is Waiting"	2013	Rock
Jet	"Are You Gonna Be My Girl"	2003	Rock
Lenny Kravitz	"Are You Gonna Go My Way"	1993	Rock
Band of Skulls	"Asleep at the Wheel"	2014	Rock
White Denim	"At Night in Dreams"	2013	Rock
Airbourne	"Back in the Game"	2013	Rock
Carrie Underwood	"Before He Cheats"	2005	Pop
Slipknot	"Before I Forget"	2004	Metal
American Authors	"Best Day of My Life"	2014	Pop
We Are the In Crowd	"The Best Thing (That Never Happened)"	2014	Rock
The Preatures	"Better Than It Ever Could Be"	2014	Indie
Sleigh Bells	"Bitter Rivals"	2013	Alternative
Against Me!	"Black Me Out"	2014	Rock
Soundgarden	"Black Rain"	2010	Rock
Lonely the Brave	"The Blue, The Green"	2014	Rock
The Dandy Warhols	"Bohemian Like You"	2000	Pop
Decade	"Brainfreeze"	2013	Rock
Judas Priest	"Breaking the Law"	1980	Metal
Weezer	"Buddy Holly"	1994	Rock
Rage Against the Machine	"Bulls on Parade"	1996	Metal
Jamestown Revival	"California (Cast Iron Soul)"	2014	Rock
Heaven's Basement	"Can't Let Go"	2013	Rock
Hilary Duff	"Chasing the Sun"	2015	Pop
Warrant	"Cherry Pie"	1990	Rock
System of a Down	"Chop Suey!"	2001	Metal
Spring King	"City"	2015	Indie
Chevelle	"The Clincher"	2004	Metal
Audioslave	"Cochise"	2002	Rock
Islander	"Coconut Dracula"	2014	Rock
Stevie Ray Vaughan and Double Trouble	"Cold Shot"	1984	Rock
Royal Blood	"Come On Over"	2014	Rock
Kongos	"Come with Me Now"	2012	Indie
Foster the People	"Coming of Age"	2014	Indie
The Karma Killers	"Coming of Age"	2015	Rock
Echosmith	"Cool Kids"	2013	Indie
OneRepublic	"Counting Stars"	2013	Pop
Pantera	"Cowboys from Hell"	1990	Metal
Alter Bridge	"Cry of Achilles"	2013	Metal
Living Colour	"Cult of Personality"	1988	Rock
Chrissie Hynde	"Dark Sunglasses"	2014	Rock
In Flames	"Deliver Us"	2011	Metal
Surfer Blood	"Demon Dance"	2013	Indie
Wavves	"Demon to Lean On"	2013	Indie
Deftones	"Diamond Eyes"	2010	Metal
Marilyn Manson	"Disposable Teens"	2000	Metal
Cheap Trick	"Don't Be Cruel"	1988	Rock
Kevin Rudolf	"Don't Give Up"	2012	Rock
The Band Perry	"Don't Let Me Be Lonely"	2013	Pop
Gary Clark, Jr.	"Don't Owe You a Thang"	2011	Rock
Disturbed	"Down with the Sickness"	2000	Metal
Incubus	"Drive"	1999	Rock
Nickelback	"Edge of a Revolution"	2014	Rock
State Champs	"Elevated"	2013	Rock
Faith No More	"Epic"	1989	Rock
Neon Trees	"Everybody Talks"	2011	Pop
Queensrÿche	"Eyes of a Stranger"	1988	Rock
Black Veil Brides	"Fallen Angels"	2011	Metal
Charli XCX	"Famous"	2014	Pop
Slaves	"Feed the Mantaray"	2015	Rock
Calvin Harris	"Feel So Close"	2012	Pop
The White Stripes	"Fell in Love with a Girl"	2001	Rock
Asking Alexandria	"Final Episode (Let's Change the Channel)"	2009	Metal
Funeral Party	"Finale"	2011	Indie
Modest Mouse	"Float On"	2004	Indie
Puppy	"Forever"	2015	Indie
Korn	"Freak on a Leash"	1998	Metal
Spector	"Friday Night, Don't Ever Let It End"	2012	Indie
Lamb of God	"Ghost Walking"	2012	Metal
AFI	"Girl's Not Grey"	2003	Rock
Good Charlotte	"Girls & Boys"	2002	Rock
Panic! at the Disco	"Girls/Girls/Boys"	2013	Rock
The Pretty Reckless	"Going to Hell"	2014	Rock
The Black Keys	"Gold on the Ceiling"	2011	Rock
Anthrax	"Got the Time"	1990	Metal
Architects	"Gravedigger"	2014	Metal
Elbow	"Grounds for Divorce"	2008	Indie
Rage Against the Machine	"Guerrilla Radio"	1999	Metal
Flobots	"Handlebars"	2007	Alternative
The Gaslight Anthem	"Handwritten"	2012	Rock
Megadeth	"Hangar 18"	1990	Metal
Blondie	"Hanging on the Telephone"	1978	Pop
New Politics	"Harlem"	2013	Indie
Angus & Julia Stone	"A Heartbreak"	2014	Indie
The Psychedelic Furs	"Heaven"	1984	Rock
Rev Theory	"Hell Yeah"	2008	Rock
Mastodon	"High Road"	2014	Metal
Red Hot Chili Peppers	"Higher Ground"	1989	Rock
Pat Benatar	"Hit Me with Your Best Shot (Live)"	1983	Rock
James Bay	"Hold Back the River"	2015	Pop
Temple of the Dog	"Hunger Strike"	1991	Rock
The Clash	"I Fought the Law"	1979	Rock
ZZ Top	"I Gotsta Get Paid"	2012	Rock
Beartooth	"I Have a Problem"	2014	Metal
Ida Maria	"I Like You So Much Better When You're Naked"	2008	Indie
Skaters	"I Wanna Dance (But I Don't Know How)"	2014	Indie
Queen	"I Want It All"	1989	Rock
Zedd	"I Want You to Know (ft. Selena Gomez)"	2015	Pop
Killswitch Engage	"In Due Time"	2013	Metal
Black Veil Brides	"In the End"	2013	Metal
Sum 41	"In Too Deep"	2001	Rock
Four Year Strong	"It Must Really Suck to Be Four Year Strong Right Now"	2010	Rock
Real Estate	"It's Real"	2011	Indie
Catfish and the Bottlemen	"Kathleen"	2014	Indie
The Offspring	"The Kids Aren't Alright"	1998	Rock
Young Rising Sons	"King of the World"	2014	Pop
Jack White	"Lazaretto"	2014	Rock
TV on the Radio	"Lazerray"	2014	Indie
Bruno Mars	"The Lazy Song"	2010	Pop
Broken Bells	"Leave It Alone"	2014	Indie
Alt-J	"Left Hand Free"	2014	Indie
Passenger	"Let Her Go"	2012	Pop
Rush	"Limelight"	1981	Rock
The Colourist	"Little Games"	2014	Indie
Of Monsters and Men	"Little Talks"	2012	Indie
One Direction	"Live While We're Young"	2012	Pop
Dream Theater	"The Looking Glass"	2013	Metal
Cold War Kids	"Louder Than Ever"	2011	Indie
The Fray	"Love Don't Die"	2014	Pop
Living Colour	"Love Rears Its Ugly Head"	1990	Rock
Iggy Pop	"Lust for Life"	1977	Rock
Sunset Sons	"Medicine"	2015	Indie
The Vines	"Metal Zone"	2014	Rock
Soul Asylum	"Misery"	1995	Rock
Wolf Alice	"Moaning Lisa Smile"	2015	Rock
Tesla	"Modern Day Cowboy"	1986	Rock
Boston	"More Than a Feeling"	1976	Rock
Marmozets	"Move Shake Hide"	2014	Rock
Lit	"My Own Worst Enemy"	1999	Rock
Fall Out Boy	"My Songs Know What You Did in the Dark (Light Em Up)"	2013	Rock
My Chemical Romance	"Na Na Na (Na Na Na Na Na Na Na Na Na)"	2010	Rock
Screaming Trees	"Nearly Lost You"	1992	Rock
Flyleaf	"New Horizons"	2012	Rock
Turbowolf	"Nine Lives"	2015	Rock
Gerard Way	"No Shows"	2014	Rock
We Are Scientists	"Nobody Move, Nobody Get Hurt"	2006	Indie
Tonight Alive	"The Ocean"	2013	Rock
Green Day	"Oh Love"	2012	Rock
R.E.M.	"The One I Love"	1987	Rock
Mudhoney	"The Only Son of the Widow from Nain"	2013	Rock
Courtney Barnett	"Pedestrian at Best"	2015	Indie
Walk off the Earth	"Red Hands"	2013	Pop
Sunset Sons	"Remember"	2014	Indie
The Shins	"The Rifle's Spiral"	2012	Indie
A Day to Remember	"Right Back at It Again"	2013	Rock
Dum Dum Girls	"Rimbaud Eyes"	2014	Indie
Cypress Hill	"Rise Up (ft. Tom Morello)"	2010	Rock
Bleachers	"Rollercoaster"	2014	Indie
The Gaslight Anthem	"Rollin' and Tumblin'"	2014	Rock
Ratt	"Round and Round"	1984	Rock
The Mowgli's	"San Francisco"	2012	Pop
Rise Against	"Satellite"	2011	Rock
Kings of Leon	"Sex on Fire"	2008	Rock
Low Cut Connie	"Shake It Little Tina"	2015	Rock
Grouplove	"Shark Attack"	2013	Indie
Ed Sheeran	"Sing"	2014	Pop
Pearl Jam	"Sirens"	2013	Rock
The Vamps	"Somebody to You (ft. Demi Lovato)"	2014	Pop
Blitz Kids	"Sometimes"	2014	Rock
Warrant	"Sometimes She Cries"	1989	Rock
Biffy Clyro	"Sounds Like Balloons"	2013	Rock
Soundgarden	"Spoonman"	1994	Rock
Fountains of Wayne	"Stacy's Mom"	2003	Pop
Paramore	"Still Into You"	2013	Pop
Alice in Chains	"Stone"	2013	Rock
Trivium	"Strife"	2013	Metal
Grizfolk	"The Struggle"	2014	Indie
Vista Chino	"Sweet Remain"	2013	Rock
Passion Pit	"Take a Walk"	2012	Indie
Bullet for My Valentine	"Temper Temper"	2013	Metal
Black Tide	"That Fire"	2011	Metal
Luke Bryan	"That's My Kind of Night"	2013	Pop
White Zombie	"Thunder Kiss '65"	1992	Metal
Bob Dylan	"Thunder on the Mountain"	2006	Rock
The Black Keys	"Tighten Up"	2010	Rock
MGMT	"Time to Pretend"	2007	Indie
Tenacious D	"Tribute"	2001	Rock
Pink	"Try"	2012	Pop
The Strokes	"Under Cover of Darkness"	2011	Indie
The War on Drugs	"Under the Pressure"	2014	Indie
Hinder	"Use Me"	2008	Rock
David Bowie	"Valentine's Day"	2013	Rock
Oceans Ate Alaska	"Vultures and Sharks"	2015	Metal
The Madden Brothers	"We Are Done"	2014	Pop
Dead Sara	"Weatherman"	2012	Rock
Jake Bugg	"What Doesn't Kill You"	2013	Indie
The Joy Formidable	"Whirring"	2011	Rock
The Orwells	"Who Needs You"	2014	Indie
Fun	"Why Am I the One"	2012	Pop
Haim	"The Wire"	2013	Indie
Darwin Deez	"You Can't Be My Girl"	2013	Indie
Amy Winehouse	"You Know I'm No Good"	2006	Pop
Don Broco	"You Wanna Know"	2013	Rock

=== Added songs ===
New songs were added to GHTV on a regular weekly basis with approximately six new songs a week since the game's release. While some songs were directly added to the on-demand and curated lineup, several other songs were introduced to GHTV through Premium Shows, typically offering three songs by a single artist or within a musical theme. Some Premium Shows, such as those for Avenged Sevenfold or Fall Out Boy, used songs and footage taken live from ongoing tours.

A player could access a Premium Show either through playing specific songs already in the GHTV catalog or through microtransactions. Completing Premium Shows could earn the player in-game rewards, such as a decorative item for their player card or on-screen fretboard. The week after their introduction, these songs were added to the on-demand playlist, and after another week entered into the GHTV's rotation of songs. At the release of Guitar Hero Live, Activision announced plans to add 70 new songs to GHTV before the end of 2015.

Between August 2017 and April 2018, only one song was added to GHTV and on 3 June 2018, Activision confirmed that the servers would be shut down 1 December 2018.

The following table lists songs that were added to GHTV since launch, including those released through Premium Shows and those directly added to the service.

Show Name	Artist(s)	Song	Year	Genre	Release date
Avenged Sevenfold Live at Download Festival	Avenged Sevenfold	"Shepherd of Fire (Live)"	2015	Metal	20 October 2015 (Note: Originally removed from GHTV on 4 November 2015 due to being a pre-order exclusive, re-added to the On-Demand Library for everybody on 23 December 2015.)
Avenged Sevenfold Live at Download Festival	Avenged Sevenfold	"Nightmare (Live)"	2015	Metal	20 October 2015
Avenged Sevenfold Live at Download Festival	Avenged Sevenfold	"Buried Alive (Live)"	2015	Metal	20 October 2015
Indie Rock Blockbusters	Foster the People	"Don't Stop (Color on the Walls)"	2011	Indie	20 October 2015
Indie Rock Blockbusters	The Strokes	"Reptilia"	2003	Indie	20 October 2015
Indie Rock Blockbusters	Interpol	"All the Rage Back Home"	2014	Indie	20 October 2015
Guitar Hero Classics	Survivor	"Eye of the Tiger"	1982	Rock	20 October 2015
Guitar Hero Classics	Disturbed	"Stricken"	2005	Metal	20 October 2015
Guitar Hero Classics	Queen	"We Are the Champions"	1977	Rock	20 October 2015
Black Veil Brides: Alive & Burning	Black Veil Brides	"Heart of Fire (Live)"	2015	Metal	4 November 2015
Black Veil Brides: Alive & Burning	Black Veil Brides	"Fallen Angels (Live)"	2015	Metal	4 November 2015
Black Veil Brides: Alive & Burning	Black Veil Brides	"In the End (Live)"	2015	Metal	4 November 2015
Legendary Headliners	Paramore	"Monster"	2011	Rock	4 November 2015
Legendary Headliners	Fall Out Boy	"Sugar, We're Goin Down"	2005	Rock	4 November 2015
Legendary Headliners	Blink-182	"First Date"	2001	Rock	4 November 2015
Pop Goes GHTV	The 1975	"Chocolate"	2013	Indie	4 November 2015
Pop Goes GHTV	American Authors	"Believer"	2014	Pop	4 November 2015
Pop Goes GHTV	George Ezra	"Budapest"	2014	Pop	4 November 2015
Rock Heroes	Iggy Pop	"Real Wild Child (Wild One)"	1986	Rock	11 November 2015
Rock Heroes	Evanescence	"Going Under"	2003	Metal	11 November 2015
Rock Heroes	The White Stripes	"Seven Nation Army"	2003	Rock	11 November 2015
Fresh for 2015	Leon Bridges	"Coming Home"	2015	Alternative	11 November 2015
Fresh for 2015	Bully	"Trying"	2015	Indie	11 November 2015
Fresh for 2015	Lonely the Brave	"Victory Line"	2015	Rock	11 November 2015
Rival Sons: Live at YouTube Space LA	Rival Sons	"Electric Man (Live)"	2015	Rock	18 November 2015
Rival Sons: Live at YouTube Space LA	Rival Sons	"Pressure and Time (Live)"	2015	Rock	18 November 2015
Rival Sons: Live at YouTube Space LA	Rival Sons	"Keep on Swinging (Live)"	2015	Rock	18 November 2015
Lords of Metal	System of a Down	"Toxicity"	2001	Metal	18 November 2015
Lords of Metal	Bullet for My Valentine	"Tears Don't Fall"	2006	Metal	18 November 2015
Lords of Metal	Judas Priest	"Painkiller"	1990	Metal	18 November 2015
Pop Punk Perfection	Sum 41	"Fat Lip"	2001	Rock	18 November 2015
Pop Punk Perfection	Four Year Strong	"Just Drive"	2011	Rock	18 November 2015
Pop Punk Perfection	Tonight Alive	"Lonely Girl"	2013	Rock	18 November 2015
Dance Meets Rock	The Prodigy	"Nasty"	2015	Alternative	25 November 2015
Dance Meets Rock	Knife Party	"Centipede"	2012	Alternative	25 November 2015
Dance Meets Rock	Zedd	"Stache"	2012	Alternative	25 November 2015
Face Melting Metal	Escape the Fate	"Issues"	2010	Metal	25 November 2015
Face Melting Metal	Atreyu	"So Others May Live"	2015	Metal	25 November 2015
Face Melting Metal	Black Veil Brides	"Heart of Fire"	2014	Metal	25 November 2015
N/A	Godsmack	"1000hp"	2014	Rock	25 November 2015 (Note: Added alongside the Dance Meets Rock and Face Melting Metal Premium Shows.)
N/A	Robert Palmer	"Addicted to Love"	1985	Rock	25 November 2015
N/A	The Glitch Mob	"Can't Kill Us"	2014	Alternative	25 November 2015
N/A	Amaranthe	"Drop Dead Cynical"	2014	Metal	25 November 2015
N/A	Chevelle	"Face to the Floor"	2011	Rock	25 November 2015
N/A	Rush	"Fly by Night"	1975	Rock	25 November 2015
N/A	Huey Lewis and the News	"Heart and Soul"	1983	Rock	25 November 2015
N/A	The Amazing Snakeheads	"Here It Comes Again"	2014	Indie	25 November 2015
N/A	Lower Than Atlantis	"Here We Go"	2014	Rock	25 November 2015
N/A	Five Finger Death Punch	"House of the Rising Sun"	2013	Metal	25 November 2015
N/A	Sammy Hagar	"I Can't Drive 55"	1984	Rock	25 November 2015
N/A	Neon Trees	"I Love You (But I Hate Your Friends)"	2014	Indie	25 November 2015
N/A	Sleeping with Sirens	"If You Can't Hang"	2011	Metal	25 November 2015
N/A	Primus	"Jerry Was a Race Car Driver"	1991	Rock	25 November 2015
N/A	Rage Against the Machine	"Killing in the Name"	1992	Metal	25 November 2015
N/A	Audioslave	"Like a Stone"	2002	Rock	25 November 2015
N/A	Judas Priest	"Living After Midnight"	1980	Metal	25 November 2015
N/A	Scott Weiland & The Wildabouts	"Modzilla"	2015	Rock	25 November 2015
N/A	Tenacious D	"Rise of the Fenix"	2012	Rock	25 November 2015
N/A	Great White	"Rock Me"	1987	Rock	25 November 2015
N/A	Cinderella	"Shake Me"	1986	Rock	25 November 2015
N/A	R.E.M.	"Shiny Happy People"	1991	Rock	25 November 2015
N/A	Walk the Moon	"Shut Up and Dance"	2014	Pop	25 November 2015
N/A	Jack White	"Sixteen Saltines"	2012	Rock	25 November 2015
N/A	Jake Bugg	"Slumville Sunrise"	2013	Indie	25 November 2015
N/A	Kings of Leon	"Supersoaker"	2013	Rock	25 November 2015
N/A	Heart	"What About Love"	1985	Rock	25 November 2015
N/A	The Outfield	"Your Love"	1985	Rock	25 November 2015
Class of 2015	Nothing But Thieves	"Ban All the Music"	2015	Indie	2 December 2015
Class of 2015	The Bots	"Blinded"	2015	Indie	2 December 2015
Class of 2015	Pulled Apart by Horses	"Hot Squash"	2014	Rock	2 December 2015
Rock the Ages: The 90s	The Offspring	"Pretty Fly (for a White Guy)"	1998	Rock	2 December 2015
Rock the Ages: The 90s	Marcy Playground	"Sex and Candy"	1997	Rock	2 December 2015
Rock the Ages: The 90s	Alice in Chains	"Them Bones"	1992	Rock	2 December 2015
Country Flavor	Carrie Underwood	"Good Girl"	2012	Pop	9 December 2015
Country Flavor	Ashley Clark	"Greyhound"	2015	Pop	9 December 2015
Country Flavor	Eric Church	"Creepin'"	2011	Pop	9 December 2015
2015 Rocks!	Of Mice & Men	"Broken Generation"	2015	Metal	9 December 2015
2015 Rocks!	Five Finger Death Punch	"Jekyll and Hyde"	2015	Metal	9 December 2015
2015 Rocks!	Motionless in White	"Break the Cycle"	2014	Metal	9 December 2015
Grizfolk: Live at YouTube Space LA	Grizfolk	"The Struggle (Live)"	2015	Indie	9 December 2015
Grizfolk: Live at YouTube Space LA	Grizfolk	"Troublemaker (Live)"	2015	Indie	9 December 2015
Grizfolk: Live at YouTube Space LA	Grizfolk	"Hymnals (Live)"	2015	Indie	9 December 2015
System of a Down Premium Show	System of a Down	"Aerials"	2001	Metal	16 December 2015
System of a Down Premium Show	System of a Down	"Lonely Day"	2005	Metal	16 December 2015
System of a Down Premium Show	System of a Down	"B.Y.O.B."	2005	Metal	16 December 2015
Weezer: Live at iHeartRadio Theater & YouTube Space LA	Weezer	"Undone – The Sweater Song (Live)"	2015	Rock	16 December 2015
Weezer: Live at iHeartRadio Theater & YouTube Space LA	Weezer	"Thank God for Girls (Live)"	2015	Rock	16 December 2015
Weezer: Live at iHeartRadio Theater & YouTube Space LA	Weezer	"Say It Ain't So (Live)"	2015	Rock	16 December 2015
The Champions	Queen	"Fat Bottomed Girls"	1978	Rock	16 December 2015
The Champions	Queen	"Hammer to Fall"	1984	Rock	16 December 2015
The Champions	Queen	"I Want to Break Free"	1984	Rock	16 December 2015
Rock the Halls	The Killers	"A Great Big Sled (ft. Toni Halliday)"	2011	Rock	23 December 2015
Rock the Halls	All Time Low	"Merry Christmas, Kiss My Ass"	2011	Rock	23 December 2015
Rock the Halls	The Darkness	"I Am Santa"	2015	Rock	23 December 2015
Christmas Rocks!	The Killers	"The Cowboys' Christmas Ball"	2011	Rock	23 December 2015
Christmas Rocks!	The Raveonettes	"The Christmas Song"	2011	Indie	23 December 2015
Christmas Rocks!	The Darkness	"Christmas Time (Don't Let the Bells End)"	2003	Rock	23 December 2015
Party Party Party!	Andrew W.K.	"Party Hard"	2001	Rock	30 December 2015
Party Party Party!	Twin Atlantic	"Fall Into the Party"	2014	Rock	30 December 2015
Party Party Party!	Steel Panther	"Party Like Tomorrow Is the End of the World"	2014	Rock	30 December 2015
The Dead Weather Live Performance Videos	The Dead Weather	"Be Still (Live)"	2015	Rock	30 December 2015
The Dead Weather Live Performance Videos	The Dead Weather	"I Feel Love (Every Million Miles) (Live)"	2015	Rock	30 December 2015
The Dead Weather Live Performance Videos	The Dead Weather	"Let Me Through (Live)"	2015	Rock	30 December 2015
Return of the Classics	Loverboy	"Working for the Weekend"	1981	Rock	30 December 2015
Return of the Classics	Survivor	"Children of the Night"	1982	Rock	30 December 2015
Return of the Classics	Pat Benatar	"You Better Run"	1980	Rock	30 December 2015
N/A	The Gaslight Anthem	"45"	2012	Rock	30 December 2015 (Note: Added alongside the Party Party Party, Dead Weather Live, and Nothing But Classics Premium Shows.)
N/A	Soundgarden	"Been Away Too Long"	2012	Rock	30 December 2015
N/A	The 1975	"Girls"	2013	Indie	30 December 2015
N/A	Of Monsters and Men	"Mountain Sound"	2012	Indie	30 December 2015
N/A	Blink-182	"The Rock Show"	2001	Rock	30 December 2015
N/A	Rise Against	"Tragedy + Time"	2014	Rock	30 December 2015
N/A	The Killers	"When You Were Young"	2006	Rock	30 December 2015
New Rock Revolution	Lower Than Atlantis	"English Kids In America"	2014	Rock	5 January 2016
New Rock Revolution	Mallory Knox	"When Are We Waking Up?"	2014	Rock	5 January 2016
New Rock Revolution	Don Broco	"Priorities"	2012	Rock	5 January 2016
Festival Anthems	Kings of Leon	"Use Somebody"	2008	Rock	5 January 2016
Festival Anthems	The Killers	"Mr. Brightside"	2004	Rock	5 January 2016
Festival Anthems	Biffy Clyro	"Black Chandelier"	2013	Rock	5 January 2016
AAA Metal	Bring Me the Horizon	"Drown"	2014	Metal	12 January 2016
AAA Metal	Marilyn Manson	"Deep Six"	2015	Metal	12 January 2016
AAA Metal	Pierce the Veil	"Bulls in the Bronx"	2012	Metal	12 January 2016
Rock Till You Drop	Nickelback	"Get 'Em Up"	2014	Rock	12 January 2016
Rock Till You Drop	Joe Satriani	"Shockwave Supernova"	2015	Rock	12 January 2016
Rock Till You Drop	Weezer	"Back to the Shack"	2014	Rock	12 January 2016
Indie Pop Hits	Little Daylight	"Mona Lisa"	2014	Indie	12 January 2016
Indie Pop Hits	Coin	"Run"	2015	Indie	12 January 2016
Indie Pop Hits	The Colourist	"We Won't Go Home"	2014	Indie	12 January 2016
Pop Power!	5 Seconds of Summer	"She Looks So Perfect"	2014	Pop	19 January 2016
Pop Power!	Sheppard	"Geronimo"	2014	Pop	19 January 2016
Pop Power!	Sky Ferreira	"You're Not the One"	2013	Pop	19 January 2016
Fall Out Boy Live From KROQ Almost Acoustic Christmas 2015	Fall Out Boy	"Centuries (Live)"	2015	Rock	19 January 2016
Fall Out Boy Live From KROQ Almost Acoustic Christmas 2015	Fall Out Boy	"Irresistible (Live)"	2015	Rock	19 January 2016
Fall Out Boy Live From KROQ Almost Acoustic Christmas 2015	Fall Out Boy	"Uma Thurman (Live)"	2015	Rock	19 January 2016
Def Leppard: On Through The Ages	Def Leppard	"Dangerous"	2015	Rock	26 January 2016
Def Leppard: On Through The Ages	Def Leppard	"Let's Go"	2015	Rock	26 January 2016
Def Leppard: On Through The Ages	Def Leppard	"Rock of Ages"	1983	Rock	26 January 2016
Indie Rock Anthems	The Strokes	"You Only Live Once"	2006	Indie	26 January 2016
Indie Rock Anthems	Miles Kane	"Don't Forget Who You Are"	2013	Indie	26 January 2016
Indie Rock Anthems	Skaters	"Miss Teen Massachusetts"	2014	Indie	26 January 2016
Guitar Legends	Seasick Steve	"Summertime Boy"	2015	Rock	2 February 2016
Guitar Legends	Stevie Ray Vaughan	"Crossfire"	1989	Rock	2 February 2016
Guitar Legends	Jack White	"Freedom at 21"	2012	Rock	2 February 2016
London Calling	Only Real	"Can't Get Happy"	2015	Indie	2 February 2016
London Calling	Rival State	"Keepsake"	2015	Rock	2 February 2016
London Calling	Slaves	"Cheer Up London"	2015	Rock	2 February 2016
Shred-a-Thon (Note: Added to a special channel on GHTV alongside "Ghost Walking", "Strife", "Cry of Achilles" and "Hangar 18".)	DragonForce	"Through the Fire and Flames"	2006	Metal	3 February 2016 (Note: Originally previewed for on demand on 11 January 2016.)
Ballads of Love	Chris Cornell	"Arms Around Your Love"	2007	Rock	10 February 2016
Ballads of Love	Hoobastank	"The Reason"	2003	Rock	10 February 2016
Ballads of Love	Goo Goo Dolls	"Iris"	1998	Rock	10 February 2016
Love on the Rocks	Bon Jovi	"You Give Love a Bad Name"	1986	Rock	10 February 2016
Love on the Rocks	Motörhead	"Heartbreaker"	2013	Metal	10 February 2016
Love on the Rocks	The Darkness	"I Believe in a Thing Called Love"	2003	Rock	10 February 2016
And The Nominees Are...	Elle King	"Ex's and Oh's"	2015	Pop	10 February 2016
And The Nominees Are...	Highly Suspect	"Lydia"	2015	Rock	10 February 2016
And The Nominees Are...	Courtney Barnett	"Nobody Really Cares If You Don't Go to the Party"	2015	Indie	10 February 2016
Wolfmother: On The Road to Victory	Wolfmother	"Victorious"	2015	Rock	17 February 2016
Wolfmother: On The Road to Victory	Wolfmother	"New Moon Rising"	2009	Rock	17 February 2016
Wolfmother: On The Road to Victory	Wolfmother	"Love Train"	2005	Rock	17 February 2016
Trailblazers: UK Rising	Blossoms	"Cut Me and I'll Bleed"	2015	Indie	24 February 2016
Trailblazers: UK Rising	Black Peaks	"Glass Built Castles"	2016	Rock	24 February 2016
Trailblazers: UK Rising	White	"Future Pleasures"	2015	Indie	24 February 2016
Rock The Ages: 1994	Soundgarden	"The Day I Tried to Live"	1994	Rock	24 February 2016
Rock The Ages: 1994	Corrosion of Conformity	"Albatross"	1994	Metal	24 February 2016
Rock The Ages: 1994	Weezer	"Say It Ain't So"	1994	Rock	24 February 2016
Hair Metal Mayhem	Poison	"Nothin' but a Good Time"	1988	Rock	1 March 2016
Hair Metal Mayhem	Mötley Crüe	"Girls, Girls, Girls"	1987	Rock	1 March 2016
Hair Metal Mayhem	L.A. Guns	"Rip and Tear"	1989	Rock	1 March 2016
Back To The Eighties	Quiet Riot	"Metal Health (Bang Your Head)"	1983	Rock	1 March 2016
Back To The Eighties	Europe	"Rock the Night"	1985	Rock	1 March 2016
Back To The Eighties	Lita Ford	"Kiss Me Deadly"	1988	Rock	1 March 2016
Stadium Rock Anthems	Bon Jovi	"Livin' on a Prayer"	1986	Rock	1 March 2016
Stadium Rock Anthems	Def Leppard	"Pour Some Sugar on Me"	1987	Rock	1 March 2016
Stadium Rock Anthems	Kiss	"Crazy Crazy Nights"	1987	Rock	1 March 2016
Rock The Ages: 2003	Incubus	"Megalomaniac"	2004	Rock	8 March 2016
Rock The Ages: 2003	Chevelle	"Send the Pain Below"	2002	Rock	8 March 2016
Rock The Ages: 2003	Marilyn Manson	"mOBSCENE"	2003	Metal	8 March 2016
Women That Rock	St. Vincent	"Birth in Reverse"	2014	Indie	8 March 2016
Women That Rock	Deap Vally	"Gonna Make My Own Money"	2013	Indie	8 March 2016
Women That Rock	Halestorm	"Apocalyptic"	2015	Rock	8 March 2016
Best Of Austin	Puppy	"The Great Beyond"	2015	Indie	15 March 2016
Best Of Austin	Dilly Dally	"Purple Rage"	2015	Indie	15 March 2016
Best Of Austin	The Family Rain	"What Are You Afraid Of?"	2015	Rock	15 March 2016
St. Patrick's Day Party	Flogging Molly	"Drunken Lullabies"	2002	Rock	15 March 2016
St. Patrick's Day Party	Two Door Cinema Club	"What You Know"	2010	Indie	15 March 2016
St. Patrick's Day Party	Ash	"Burn Baby Burn"	2001	Rock	15 March 2016
Austin Rocks!	The Gills	"Rubberband"	2015	Indie	15 March 2016
Austin Rocks!	Worriers	"Most Space"	2015	Indie	15 March 2016
Austin Rocks!	Lyger	"Stroke"	2014	Indie	15 March 2016
Rock vs. Hip Hop	Kid Cudi	"Erase Me" (ft. Kanye West)	2010	Rock	22 March 2016
Rock vs. Hip Hop	Liam Bailey	"Villain (ft. ASAP Ferg)"	2014	Alternative	22 March 2016
Rock vs. Hip Hop	Kevin Rudolf	"Let It Rock" (ft. Lil Wayne)	2008	Rock	22 March 2016
Punk Rock Connection	The Gaslight Anthem	"The '59 Sound"	2008	Rock	22 March 2016
Punk Rock Connection	Four Year Strong	"Go Down In History"	2015	Rock	22 March 2016
Punk Rock Connection	Anti-Flag	"Brandenburg Gate (ft. Tim Armstrong)"	2015	Rock	22 March 2016
Blacklisted	Black Veil Brides	"Goodbye Agony"	2014	Metal	29 March 2016
Blacklisted	Black Tide	"Walking Dead Man"	2011	Metal	29 March 2016
Blacklisted	Black Stone Cherry	"Me and Mary Jane"	2014	Rock	29 March 2016
Back To The 90s	Alice in Chains	"Man in the Box"	1990	Rock	29 March 2016
Back To The 90s	Cracker	"Low"	1993	Rock	29 March 2016
Back To The 90s	Rage Against the Machine	"Sleep Now in the Fire"	1999	Rock	29 March 2016
Everybody Wants The Struts	The Struts	"Could Have Been Me"	2014	Rock	5 April 2016
Everybody Wants The Struts	The Struts	"Kiss This"	2014	Rock	5 April 2016
Everybody Wants The Struts	The Struts	"Put Your Money On Me"	2014	Rock	5 April 2016
Pop Punk 2002	Sum 41	"Still Waiting"	2002	Rock	5 April 2016
Pop Punk 2002	Good Charlotte	"Lifestyles of the Rich and Famous"	2002	Rock	5 April 2016
Pop Punk 2002	American Hi-Fi	"Flavor of the Weak"	2001	Rock	5 April 2016
Indio Rocks	The 1975	"Love Me"	2015	Indie	12 April 2016
Indio Rocks	Wolf Alice	"Giant Peach"	2015	Rock	12 April 2016
Indio Rocks	DMA's	"Delete"	2015	Indie	12 April 2016
Desert Rising	Børns	"Electric Love"	2015	Indie	19 April 2016
Desert Rising	Of Monsters and Men	"Empire"	2015	Indie	19 April 2016
Desert Rising	Rancid	"Ruby Soho"	1995	Indie	19 April 2016
Face Melting Metal 2	August Burns Red	"Identity"	2015	Metal	19 April 2016
Face Melting Metal 2	Bullet for My Valentine	"Raising Hell"	2013	Metal	19 April 2016
Face Melting Metal 2	Arch Enemy	"War Eternal"	2014	Metal	19 April 2016
Festival Headliners	Bon Jovi	"Because We Can"	2013	Rock	26 April 2016
Festival Headliners	Kings of Leon	"Radioactive"	2010	Rock	26 April 2016
Festival Headliners	Judas Priest	"You've Got Another Thing Comin'"	1982	Metal	26 April 2016
The New Cool	Kurt Vile	"Never Run Away"	2013	Indie	3 May 2016
The New Cool	Title Fight	"Rose of Sharon"	2015	Indie	3 May 2016
The New Cool	Benjamin Booker	"Violent Shiver"	2014	Rock	3 May 2016
Brit Icons: Manic Street Preachers	Manic Street Preachers	"Motorcycle Emptiness"	1992	Rock	10 May 2016
Brit Icons: Manic Street Preachers	Manic Street Preachers	"You Stole the Sun from My Heart"	1998	Rock	10 May 2016
Brit Icons: Manic Street Preachers	Manic Street Preachers	"Your Love Alone Is Not Enough (ft. Nina Persson)"	2007	Rock	10 May 2016
Dance Meets Rock	The Crystal Method	"Sling the Decks"	2014	Alternative	17 May 2016
Dance Meets Rock	Modestep	"Another Day (ft. Popeska)"	2013	Alternative	17 May 2016
Dance Meets Rock	Pendulum	"Witchcraft"	2010	Alternative	17 May 2016
Hard Rock Heroes	Adelitas Way	"Dog on a Leash"	2014	Rock	24 May 2016
Hard Rock Heroes	Papa Roach	"Face Everything and Rise"	2015	Metal	24 May 2016
Hard Rock Heroes	Stone Sour	"Do Me a Favor"	2013	Metal	24 May 2016
Magic Of The Movies	Jon Bon Jovi	"Blaze of Glory"	1990	Rock	31 May 2016
Magic Of The Movies	Simple Minds	"Don't You (Forget About Me)"	1985	Pop	31 May 2016
Magic Of The Movies	Rick Springfield	"Jessie's Girl"	1981	Rock	31 May 2016
Bar Classics	Semisonic	"Closing Time"	1998	Rock	7 June 2016
Bar Classics	Bon Jovi	"I'll Sleep When I'm Dead"	1992	Rock	7 June 2016
Bar Classics	Spin Doctors	"Two Princes"	1991	Rock	7 June 2016
Dad Loves Rock	Kiss	"Rock and Roll All Nite"	1975	Rock	14 June 2016
Dad Loves Rock	Blue Öyster Cult	"Take Me Away"	1983	Rock	14 June 2016
Dad Loves Rock	Rainbow	"Since You Been Gone"	1979	Rock	14 June 2016
Pop Punk Invasion	New Found Glory	"My Friends Over You"	2002	Rock	21 June 2016
Pop Punk Invasion	Good Charlotte	"The River (ft. M. Shadows and Synyster Gates)"	2007	Rock	21 June 2016
Pop Punk Invasion	Sleeping with Sirens	"Go Go Go"	2015	Rock	21 June 2016
Metal Hits The Road	Crown the Empire	"Bloodline"	2014	Metal	28 June 2016
Metal Hits The Road	Motionless in White	"Reincarnate"	2014	Metal	28 June 2016
Metal Hits The Road	Issues	"Hooligans"	2013	Metal	28 June 2016
Indie Fest Special	The Strokes	"Taken for a Fool"	2011	Indie	5 July 2016
Indie Fest Special	Kurt Vile	"Pretty Pimpin'"	2015	Indie	5 July 2016
Indie Fest Special	Passion Pit	"Carried Away"	2012	Indie	5 July 2016
Summer Tunes	Cheerleader	"Sunshine of Your Youth"	2015	Pop	12 July 2016
Summer Tunes	The Pains of Being Pure at Heart	"Until the Sun Explodes"	2014	Pop	12 July 2016
Summer Tunes	Walk the Moon	"Anna Sun"	2012	Pop	12 July 2016
Classic Rock Fest	Cheap Trick	"If You Want My Love"	1982	Rock	19 July 2016
Classic Rock Fest	Iggy Pop	"Five Foot One"	1979	Rock	19 July 2016
Classic Rock Fest	Jane's Addiction	"Just Because"	2003	Rock	19 July 2016
Guitar Hero Classics Volume 1	Blink-182	"Dammit"	1997	Rock	26 July 2016
Guitar Hero Classics Volume 1	Sublime	"Santeria"	1996	Indie	26 July 2016
Guitar Hero Classics Volume 1	Helmet	"Unsung"	1992	Rock	26 July 2016
Guitar Hero Classics Volume 2	3 Doors Down	"Kryptonite"	2000	Rock	2 August 2016
Guitar Hero Classics Volume 2	Alice in Chains	"No Excuses"	1994	Rock	2 August 2016
Guitar Hero Classics Volume 2	Modest Mouse	"Ocean Breathes Salty"	2004	Indie	2 August 2016
Rock The School Bus	Marcy Playground	"Saint Joe on the School Bus"	1997	Rock	9 August 2016
Rock The School Bus	The Neighbourhood	"Sweater Weather"	2013	Indie	9 August 2016
Rock The School Bus	Cracker	"Teen Angst (What the World Needs Now)"	1992	Rock	9 August 2016
Summer Rock Fest	Jake Bugg	"Taste It"	2012	Indie	16 August 2016
Summer Rock Fest	Wolfmother	"Dimension"	2005	Rock	16 August 2016
Summer Rock Fest	Andrew W.K.	"Your Rules"	2003	Rock	16 August 2016
Indie Rock Special: Young The Giant	Young the Giant	"It's About Time"	2014	Indie	23 August 2016
Indie Rock Special: Young The Giant	Young the Giant	"Something to Believe In"	2016	Indie	23 August 2016
Indie Rock Special: Young The Giant	Young the Giant	"Silvertongue"	2016	Indie	23 August 2016
After School Special	Sum 41	"Underclass Hero"	2007	Rock	30 August 2016
After School Special	Foster the People	"Pumped Up Kicks"	2011	Indie	30 August 2016
After School Special	Britny Fox	"Girlschool"	1988	Rock	30 August 2016
Face Melting Metal 3	Bullet for My Valentine	"Your Betrayal"	2010	Metal	6 September 2016
Face Melting Metal 3	Marilyn Manson	"The Fight Song"	2000	Metal	6 September 2016
Face Melting Metal 3	Arch Enemy	"My Apocalypse"	2005	Metal	6 September 2016
Women In Rock	Chrissie Hynde	"Down the Wrong Way"	2014	Rock	13 September 2016
Women In Rock	Veruca Salt	"Volcano Girls"	1997	Rock	13 September 2016
Women In Rock	Gossip	"Heavy Cross"	2009	Rock	13 September 2016
Go Glam!	Warrant	"Down Boys"	1989	Rock	20 September 2016
Go Glam!	Tesla	"The Way It Is"	1989	Rock	20 September 2016
Go Glam!	Great White	"Once Bitten, Twice Shy"	1989	Rock	20 September 2016
Country Rock Showdown	Carrie Underwood	"Something in the Water"	2014	Pop	27 September 2016
Country Rock Showdown	Easton Corbin	"Let's Ride"	2015	Pop	27 September 2016
Country Rock Showdown	Billy Currington	"Hey Girl"	2013	Pop	27 September 2016
80s Rock Classics	Cinderella	"Somebody Save Me"	1987	Rock	4 October 2016
80s Rock Classics	Autograph	"Turn Up the Radio"	1984	Rock	4 October 2016
80s Rock Classics	Sammy Hagar	"Hands and Knees"	1987	Rock	4 October 2016
90s Rock Classics	Dave Matthews Band	"Stay (Wasting Time)"	1998	Rock	11 October 2016
90s Rock Classics	Blind Melon	"No Rain"	1992	Rock	11 October 2016
90s Rock Classics	R.E.M.	"Losing My Religion"	1991	Rock	11 October 2016
Forever Classic Rock	Starship	"We Built This City"	1985	Rock	25 October 2016 (Note: Originally previewed for on demand on 3 October 2016.)
Forever Classic Rock	Rush	"Tom Sawyer"	1981	Rock	25 October 2016
Forever Classic Rock	Kansas	"Carry On Wayward Son"	1976	Rock	25 October 2016
90s Rock Pioneers	Living Colour	"Type"	1990	Rock	15 November 2016
90s Rock Pioneers	Slipknot	"Duality"	2004	Metal	15 November 2016
90s Rock Pioneers	Joe Satriani	"Summer Song"	1992	Rock	15 November 2016
Rock From Across The Pond	The Darkness	"Barbarian"	2015	Rock	6 December 2016
Rock From Across The Pond	Spiders	"Why Don't You?"	2014	Rock	6 December 2016
Rock From Across The Pond	Turbowolf	"Rabbits Foot"	2015	Rock	6 December 2016
Alt Rock Bests	Alien Ant Farm	"Movies"	2001	Rock	3 January 2017
Alt Rock Bests	3 Doors Down	"In the Dark"	2016	Rock	3 January 2017
Alt Rock Bests	Don Broco	"Money Power Fame"	2015	Rock	3 January 2017
00's Rock Classics	The Killers	"Somebody Told Me"	2004	Rock	31 January 2017
00's Rock Classics	Pearl Jam	"I Am Mine"	2002	Rock	31 January 2017
00's Rock Classics	The All-American Rejects	"Move Along"	2005	Rock	31 January 2017
'Til Death Do Us Rock	Corrosion of Conformity	"Dance of the Dead"	1991	Metal	28 February 2017
'Til Death Do Us Rock	While She Sleeps	"Brainwashed"	2015	Metal	28 February 2017
'Til Death Do Us Rock	Soundgarden	"Black Hole Sun"	1994	Rock	28 February 2017
LA Rocks	Colleen Green	"TV"	2015	Indie	4 April 2017
LA Rocks	The Mowgli's	"I'm Good"	2015	Pop	4 April 2017
LA Rocks	Dorothy	"After Midnight"	2014	Indie	4 April 2017
New Rock Heroes	Davis	"Two Cents"	2016	Indie	2 May 2017
New Rock Heroes	Jake Bugg	"Two Fingers"	2012	Indie	2 May 2017
New Rock Heroes	Kongos	"Take It From Me" (Note: Error not corrected by Activision during Premium Show period caused the already present on GHTV song "Come With Me Now" to appear on this show instead of this song. The song is shown as added to this show according to the official Guitar Hero Twitter, and the game's website.)	2016	Indie	2 May 2017 (Note: Song was available on demand in August due to the error in the show.)
Face Melting Metal 4	Beartooth	"The Lines"	2014	Metal	6 June 2017
Face Melting Metal 4	In Flames	"Rusted Nail"	2014	Metal	6 June 2017
Face Melting Metal 4	Trivium	"Through Blood and Dirt and Bone"	2013	Metal	6 June 2017
Ultimate Tour Line Up	Young Guns	"Bones"	2012	Rock	10 April 2018

== Reception ==
Reviewers considered the on-disc soundtrack for Guitar Hero Live weak. Griffin McElroy of Polygon found it the "biggest disappointment" of the game given the setlist had mostly songs from 2000 or later, forgoing classic rock songs. GameSpot's Scott Buttersworth stated that many of the on-disc selections are pop songs that "just aren't cut out for Guitar Hero gameplay", as they feature the same repeating guitar riff over and over. Ben Griffin of GamesRadar was more favorable of the on-disc set list, finding that the tracks represented "the music landscape as it is rather than as it was". Chris Carter of Destructoid also appreciated the soundtrack, calling it a "good spread" of songs that can appeal to everyone.

The GHTV mode earned mixed opinions, with most reviewers praising the concept. The presentation of the channels was highlighted as hearkening to the heyday of MTV, and praised for providing players with the ability to explore new music. The selection of songs for GHTV was considered very diverse, and some reviewers found the GHTV songlist to be better varied than the on-disc list, providing songs from "six-string classic" bands that work well for games like Guitar Hero. Criticism was raised on the use of microtransactions and premium shows, disallowing players to play specific tracks at any time without cost.
