= Road Warrior (EP) =

EP by Black Tide
- Released: 2008
- Genre: Heavy metal
- Length: 8:37
- Label: Interscope

Black Tide chronology
| Light from Above (2008) | Road Warrior (2008) | Al Ciero EP (2011) |

Road Warrior is a limited 7" vinyl released by American heavy metal band Black Tide in 2008. It features a live recording of the song "Warriors of Time" from their debut album Light from Above on the B-side and a cover of Iron Maiden's "Prowler". "Prowler" was originally released on the Kerrang! compilation Maiden Heaven Iron Maiden tribute CD as well as the band's CD single for the song "Shout". The cover is a scene from the music video for "Shockwave". It was the last release to feature rhythm guitarist Alex Nuñez.

This EP is also available on iTunes, but as two separate singles. The physical 7" version was strictly a limited edition collector's item for fans.

== Track listing ==
Side A
| No. | Title | Writer(s) | Length |
|---|---|---|---|
| 1. | "Warriors of Time (Live)" | Gabriel Garcia | 4:59 |

Side B
| No. | Title | Writer(s) | Length |
|---|---|---|---|
| 2. | "Prowler" (Iron Maiden cover) | Steve Harris | 3:53 |
| Total length: | | | 8:37 |

== Personnel ==
- Gabriel Garcia: vocals, lead guitar
- Alex Nuñez: rhythm guitar, backing vocals
- Zakk Sandler: bass, backing vocals
- Steven Spence: drums, percussion
