= Colorist (disambiguation) =

A colorist is a comics artist responsible for adding color to black-and-white line art.

Colorist may also refer to:

- Colourist painting, a style of art characterized by the use of intense color
- Color Field painting, a style of abstract art characterized by large fields of flat, solid color
- Scottish Colourists, a group of painters from Scotland in the early 1900s
- Colorist (music), a group of sixteenth-century German organ composers
- Colorist, one who performs color grading on images
- Colorist, one who discriminates based on skin color
- The Colourist, a rock music ensemble from Orange County, California
  - The Colourist (album), the debut album from the band of the same name

== See also ==
- Colorism, or discrimination based on skin color
