= Fever Joy =

American alternative pop band

- Origin: Los Angeles, California, U.S.
- Genres: Alternative pop
- Years active: 2018–present
- Labels: Honey Pit
- Members: Avery Robitaille; Sean Baker
- Past members: Kevin Holm
- Website: feverjoymusic.com

Fever Joy is an American music duo formed in Los Angeles, California in 2018. The band consists of vocalist Avery Robitaille, and drummer Sean Baker.

== Early life ==
Singer Avery Robitaille was raised in Indonesia by her missionary parents until she was 18 years old. She spent most of her young adult life fighting to find her voice against conservative, religious and even cultural differences. Robitaille often turned to journaling to funnel her dreams and vision of being an artist and touring the world. After finishing home schooling, she relocated to Los Angeles, California to pursue a career in music.

== Career ==
=== Formation and early years ===
While playing an open mic night at The Night Owl in Fullerton, California, Robitaille was approached by Sean Baker and Kevin Holm who were both interested in starting a band with her.

Fever Joy was eventually introduced to Adam Castilla of The Colourist. After agreeing to producing their first single, Adam connected Fever Joy to Grammy Award-winning mastering engineer Joe LaPorta to finalize their sound. Their debut single 'Shots' was released in June 2018 and charted on Hype Machine within the first week of its release. Their debut single “Shots” immediately put the band on the radar of anyone who loves discovering new alt pop.

=== Reflections EP ===
During the writing of the Reflections EP, guitarist Kevin Holm left the band citing personal reasons and a difference in musical direction. The EP premiered on Live Nation publication Ones To Watch on November 14, 2019.

The title of the EP was inspired by the EP being a collection of tracks that aim to look inward. Each song examines a true event that went on during the formation of the band and the writing of the EP. Avery Robitaille shared, “This EP is about empowerment, removing a ‘filter’ and just being open about how certain life experiences made us feel.” Baker spoke further, sharing, “Music is one of the only things that allows us to see into other people's experiences from a distance and connect with them. With that insight, and connection we can learn to be more understanding and helpful with each others circumstances.”

== Artistry ==
=== Musical style and themes ===
Fever Joy is said to have a mixed sound of Florence Welch of Florence and The Machine, Hayley Williams of Paramore and Lynn Gunn of PVRIS by Buzz Music. The media outlet continued their thoughts on Fever Joy's sound by saying "It could be hipster indie music, it could be alt-rock radio music and it could even be considered pop music and it sounds like this is who they want to be." Others have compared them to the likes of Blondie and Imagine Dragons. They have been called synth pop, pop-rock, pop bombast, indie pop, indie rock, and alt-pop.

The name Fever Joy is a juxtaposition representing balance. "We are very interested in the Yin and Yang. Avery has yin and yang rings that she wears every day, and because this band is so integral to our own personal growth, we wanted to incorporate this worldview of balance into the band as well" said Baker. Fever Joy often speaks about self empowerment, exploring balance, finding your own voice and remaining optimistic. Robitaille and Baker do not just want to pull back the curtain on their own deeper personalities, they hope it fosters a greater connection between them and their listeners, ideally creating a wider scope of acceptance, conversation and healing.

Robitaille is noted for her distinctively low, sultry and hypnotic voice.

== Live appearances ==
In March 2019, Fever Joy performed at South by Southwest in Austin, Texas and later that year headlined one of LA's most coveted music industry showcase, School Night, known for helping break new artists including Alt-J, Hozier, Billie Eilish, BØRNS, Dua Lipa, Sofi Tukker, ODESZA, Lizzo, and LANY.

== Band members ==
=== Current members ===
- Avery Robitallie – vocals, piano (2018–present)
- Sean "Tean" Baker – drums, guitar, bass guitar (2018– present)

=== Former members ===
- Kevin Holm – guitar (2018–2019)

== Discography ==
=== Singles ===
- "Shots" (2018)
- "R.Y.W.B." (2019)
- "Done Dreaming" (2019)

=== EPs ===
- Reflections (2019)
