= Will You Wait for Me (EP) =

EP by The Colourist
- Released: 31 July 2015
- Recorded: 2015
- Genre: Indie pop
- Length: 14:01
- Label: Independent

The Colourist chronology
Inversions (2014)	Will You Wait for Me (2015)

Will You Wait for Me is the third EP by American rock band The Colourist. Released on July 31, 2015, the album was the first release of new songs since their self-titled full-length debut album in early 2014.

== Background ==
In March 2015, a single entitled "When I'm Away" was published, and streamed by Los Angeles radio station KSRY FM. This song was then used as the theme song for a Hulu television commercial the following May. Two months later, another song named "Romancing" was published on indieshuffle.com. One week after the EP was released, a music video was published for the song.

== Critical reception ==
Laura Neumayer, a writer for American University student newspaper The Eagle Online describes "When I'm Away" as "complete with a groovy guitar riff reminiscent of The Lighthouse and the Whaler's "Venice"". Ian Hays of Culture Collide described "Set it Right" as being "more rock influenced" where "heavy drums were at the forefront of the song".

== Track listing ==
No.	Title	Length
1.	"Set It Right"	3:27
2.	"When I'm Away"	3:23
3.	"Romancing"	3:53
4.	"Time Waster"	3:18
Total length:		14:01
