= Inversions (EP) =

EP by The Colourist
- Released: 28 October 2014
- Recorded: 2014
- Genre: Indie pop
- Length: 24:51
- Label: Republic Records, Universal Records

The Colourist chronology
The Colourist (2014)	Inversions (2014)	Will You Wait for Me (2015)

Inversions is the second extended play album by American rock band The Colourist. Released on 28 October 2014, the album contains remixes of five songs from the eponymous debut LP from the band by recording artists such as The Chainsmokers, St. Lucia, Yeasayer, Magic Man and The Jane Doze.

== Background ==
In early 2013, Jean-Philip Grobler (also known as St. Lucia) remixed "Little Games", the debut single from the band, which was portrayed on Vice Media. In the middle of that year, MTV published the Magic Man Remix of "Yes Yes" with Baeble Music and Hellhound Music featuring The Chainsmokers remix of "Fix This" at the end of that year. Four months prior, debut EP Lido was published with their debut studio album being released during the first quarter of 2014. In early October 2014, The Colourist remix of "Say You Need Me" from the LP was debuted in preparation for the release of the EP. One month following the release of the six song production, Culture Collide debuted the video for the same song.

== Critical reception ==
The St. Lucia remix of "Little Games" was rated as the No.1 song on Hype Machine. Vice Media stated that St. Lucia "pulls a warm Balearic blanket over the original, sanding away its rough edges with bright synths and lightly gated percussion" with Invisible Children describing the work as "total re-imagination and made specifically for after-hour parties".

Brooke Ferguson of The Music Ninja stated that "Say You Need Me" is "guaranteed going to make you want to groove like never before" with Ian Hays of Culture Collide describing the song as getting "an ‘80s makeover" with an "‘80s theme [extending] to the video itself".

== Track listing ==
All tracks are written by Adam Castilla, Kollin Johannsen, Maya Tuttle and Justin Wagner.

No.	Title	Writer(s)	Length
1.	"Little Games" (St. Lucia remix)		4:33
2.	"Fix This" (The Chainsmokers remix)	Andrew Taggart	3:39
3.	"Yes Yes" (Magic Man remix)		4:44
4.	"Little Games" (Yeasayer remix)		2:42
5.	"We Won’t Go Home" (Jane Doze remix)		5:07
6.	"Say You Need Me" (The Colourist remix)	Carlos de la Garza	4:06
Total length:			24:51
