= The Buddz =

American rock band

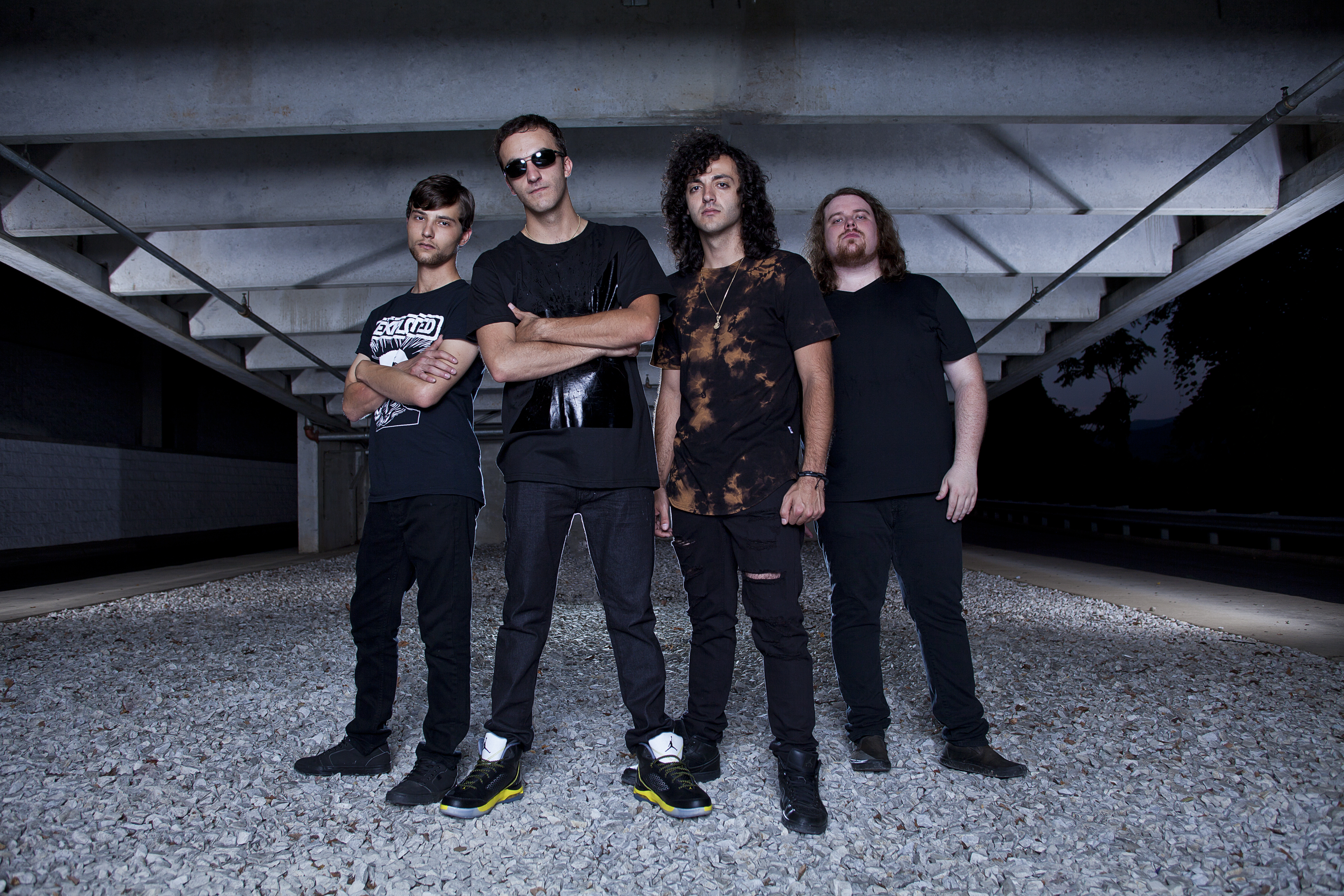

Background information
- Origin: Bristol, Tennessee, United States
- Genres: Rock
- Years active: 2006-c. 2020
- Members: Faysal Scott Smile II; Matt Smile; Brandon Paykamian; Nate Kennedy
- Past members: Alex Chamis; Max Crawford; Rob Rogers

The Buddz was an American rock band from Bristol, Tennessee, United States. The group was established in 2006 by brothers Faysal Scott Smile II and Matthew Smile. The lineup included Faysal Scott Smile II (lead vocals and rhythm guitar), Matthew Smile (vocals and lead guitarist), Nate Kennedy (vocals and bass guitar), Brandon Paykamian (vocals and drums).

The Buddz's single "Bring Me Down" released on April 3, 2015, and featuring Gabriel Garcia of Black Tide, reached over one million views on YouTube. The Buddz recorded their new album, Burn Down, with American rock producer/musician Dave Fortman and American sound engineer Ted Jensen.

The Buddz headlined the Whisky A Go Go in Los Angeles, California on May 24, 2015.

The Buddz released their first comic book in conjunction with Burn Down on April 20, 2018.

In October 2023, lead vocalist Faysal Scott Smile was announced as the new lead singer of Vinnie Vincent Invasion.
