= Will You Wait for Me =

Will You Wait for Me may refer to:

- "Will You Wait for Me?", a song by British singer Kavana
- Will You Wait for Me (EP), an EP by American rock band The Colourist
