= Kiss This =

Kiss This may refer to:

- Kiss This (album), a 1992 compilation album by the Sex Pistols
- Kiss This (Aaron Tippin song)
- Kiss This (The Struts song)
