= Put Your Money on Me =

"Put Your Money on Me" may refer to:

- "Put Your Money on Me", a song by The Struts from the album Everybody Wants,
- "Put Your Money on Me", a song by Arcade Fire from the album Everything Now.
