= Could Have Been Me =

Single by the Struts

from the album Everybody Wants
- Released: October 21, 2013
- Recorded: 2012
- Genre: Glam rock
- Length: 3:07
- Label: Interscope
- Songwriters: Rick Parkhouse; Adam Slack; Luke Spiller; George Tizzard; Josh Wilkinson
- Producer: Red Triangle

The Struts singles chronology
"Could Have Been Me" (2013)	"Kiss This" (2014)

"Could Have Been Me" is a song by English glam rock band the Struts. It was released as the first single from their debut studio album Everybody Wants. Originally released in 2013, the song began to increase in popularity as the song rose up the American airplay charts in 2015, peaking at No. 5 on the Alternative Songs chart.

A re-recorded version of the song featuring Brian May on lead guitar was released as a single on September 3, 2025.

== Music video ==
A music video for "Could Have Been Me" directed by Rhys Frampton in collaboration with the shoe company Jeffery-West was released in 2013.

A second music video was released for "Could Have Been Me" on August 22, 2015, directed by Jonas Åkerlund.

== Charts ==
=== Weekly charts ===
Chart (2015)	Peak position
Canada Rock (Billboard)	2
US Hot Rock & Alternative Songs (Billboard)	15
US Rock & Alternative Airplay (Billboard)	4

=== Year-end charts ===
Chart (2015)	Position
US Hot Rock Songs (Billboard)	44
US Rock Airplay (Billboard)	21

== Certifications ==
=== The Struts version ===
Region	Certification	Certified units/sales
New Zealand (RMNZ)	Gold	15,000^{‡}
United Kingdom (BPI)	Silver	200,000^{‡}
United States (RIAA)	Platinum	1,000,000^{‡}
^{‡} Sales+streaming figures based on certification alone.

=== Halsey version ===
Region	Certification	Certified units/sales
Brazil (Pro-Música Brasil)	Gold	20,000^{‡}
New Zealand (RMNZ)	Gold	15,000^{‡}
United Kingdom (BPI)	Silver	200,000^{‡}
United States (RIAA)	Platinum	1,000,000^{‡}
^{‡} Sales+streaming figures based on certification alone.

== Uses ==
- The theme song for NXT TakeOver: London.
- The opening song for MLB The Show 16.
- Used in a trailer for the 2016 video game Ratchet & Clank.
- In an advertisement for the Mercedes-Benz 2021 E-Class.
- Nicholas Galitzine performs the song alongside Camila Cabello in Cinderella.
- Halsey performs the song in the 2021 animated film Sing 2 as her character Porsha Crystal.
