= Lido (EP) =

EP by The Colourist
- Released: 20 August 2013
- Genre: Indie pop
- Length: 12:35
- Label: Republic Records, Universal Records

The Colourist chronology
Lido (2013)	The Colourist (2014)

Singles from Lido
- 1. "Little Games" Released: 5 March 2013

Lido is the debut EP from American indie pop band The Colourist. The album, which was named after The Lido Building (an opaque warehouse on an artificial island in Newport Beach used as a practice space by the band), was released on August 20, 2013 through Republic Records.

== Touring ==
Following the EP release in late 2013, the Colourist toured North America with New Zealand alternative rock band The Naked and Famous.

== Track listing ==
No.	Title	Length
1.	"Little Games"	2:42
2.	"We Won't Go Home"	3:12
3.	"Yes Yes"	2:57
4.	"Fix This"	3:46
Total length:		12:37

== Charts ==
=== Album ===
Chart (2013)	Peak position
Heatseekers Albums	16

=== Singles ===
Title	Year	Peak chart positions
Title	Year	Alt
"Little Games"	2013	31

== Trivia ==
Debut single "Little Games" has been featured on the AT&T Nokia Lumia 1020 commercial.
