= Chasing Shadows (Black Tide album) =

Studio album by Black Tide
- Released: October 16, 2015
- Recorded: 2015
- Studio: Live House Studios
- Genre: Alternative metal
- Length: 39:46
- Label: Pavement Entertainment
- Producer: Mariano Aponte

Black Tide chronology
Bite the Bullet (2013)	Chasing Shadows (2015)

Singles from Chasing Shadows
- 1. "Angel in the Dark" Released: September 15, 2015

Chasing Shadows is the third studio album by American heavy metal band Black Tide. It was released on October 16, 2015. This is the first official studio release to not feature original bassist Zakk Sandler and drummer Steven Spence. The album's first single titled "Angel in the Dark" was released on September 15, 2015. This would be the group's last release before their breakup in 2016. In 2025, the band reunited.

== Track listing ==
All tracks are written by Gabriel Garcia.

No.	Title	Writer(s)	Length
1.	"Intro"		1:14
2.	"Guidelines"		4:15
3.	"Angel in the Dark"		3:54
4.	"Predator (Animal)"		4:07
5.	"Burn"	Garcia, Aponte	3:40
6.	"Chasing Shadows"		3:28
7.	"Before We Form"		4:23
8.	"Sex Is Angry"		4:36
9.	"Welcome to Misery"		3:28
10.	"Heaven"		3:35
11.	"Promised Land"		3:06
Total length:			39:46

== Personnel ==
- Gabriel Garcia: vocals, lead guitar, bass
- Austin Diaz: rhythm guitar, backing vocals
- Cody Paige: drums, percussion
