= Bite the Bullet (EP) =

EP by Black Tide
- Released: November 12, 2013
- Recorded: October 2012–June 2013 at Live House Studios, Miami, Florida
- Genre: Hard rock, melodic metalcore
- Label: InnerCat Music Group, LLC
- Producer: Mariano Aponte

Black Tide chronology
Just Another Drug (2012)	Bite the Bullet (2013)	Chasing Shadows (2015)

Singles from Bite The Bullet
- 1. "Not Afraid" Released: August 31, 2013

Bite the Bullet is the fourth EP by American heavy metal band Black Tide. It was scheduled to be released in the fall of 2013 under the label InnerCat Music Group. The EP was produced and engineered by Mariano Aponte. This is the first release without drummer Steven Spence. The first single titled "Not Afraid", was released on August 31.

== Background ==
In an interview with The Vinne Langdon show, bassist Zakk Sandler stated that he was not invited to be a part of the Just Another Drug EP. Later, it led to the departure of him and drummer Steven Spence.

According to Gabriel Garcia, "“So as you all know we've been working on a six song EP. We're excited to let you all know it'll be titled Bite The Bullet. We recently finished tracking Bite The Bullet at Live House studios in Miami, FL with producer/engineer Mariano Aponte formerly of Silvia Massy's world famous RadioStar Studios. We really went back to our roots on this one and it is being mixed right now! Can't wait for you all to hear this!”

On August 31, the band released their first single off their forthcoming EP, titled "Not Afraid".

== Writing and recording ==
On October 13, 2012, Gabriel tweeted "So excited to let all our fans know that I'm currently on my way to Georgia to start working on demos for Black Tide's 3rd cd!!!!".

On July 3, 2013, Black Tide stated that they were going through a line-up change, and that they are working on a new Black Tide EP (6 songs).

Bite the Bullet was tracked at Live House Studios in Miami with producer and engineer Mariano Aponte at the helm.

== Track listing ==
All lyrics are written by Gabriel Garcia; all music is composed by Black Tide.

No.	Title	Length
1.	"Set Me Free (Alive)"	3:15
2.	"Not Afraid (Feat. Raul N. Garcia)"	3:52
3.	"Haunted"	3:38
4.	"In the Mirror"	4:29
5.	"Can't Get Enough"	3:22
6.	"Suffering"	2:53
Total length:		20:09

== Personnel ==
Black Tide

- Gabriel Garcia – lead vocals, lead guitar, bass
- Austin Diaz – rhythm guitar, backing vocals
- Tim D'Onofrio – drums, percussion
