= Spiders (Swedish band) =

Swedish rock band

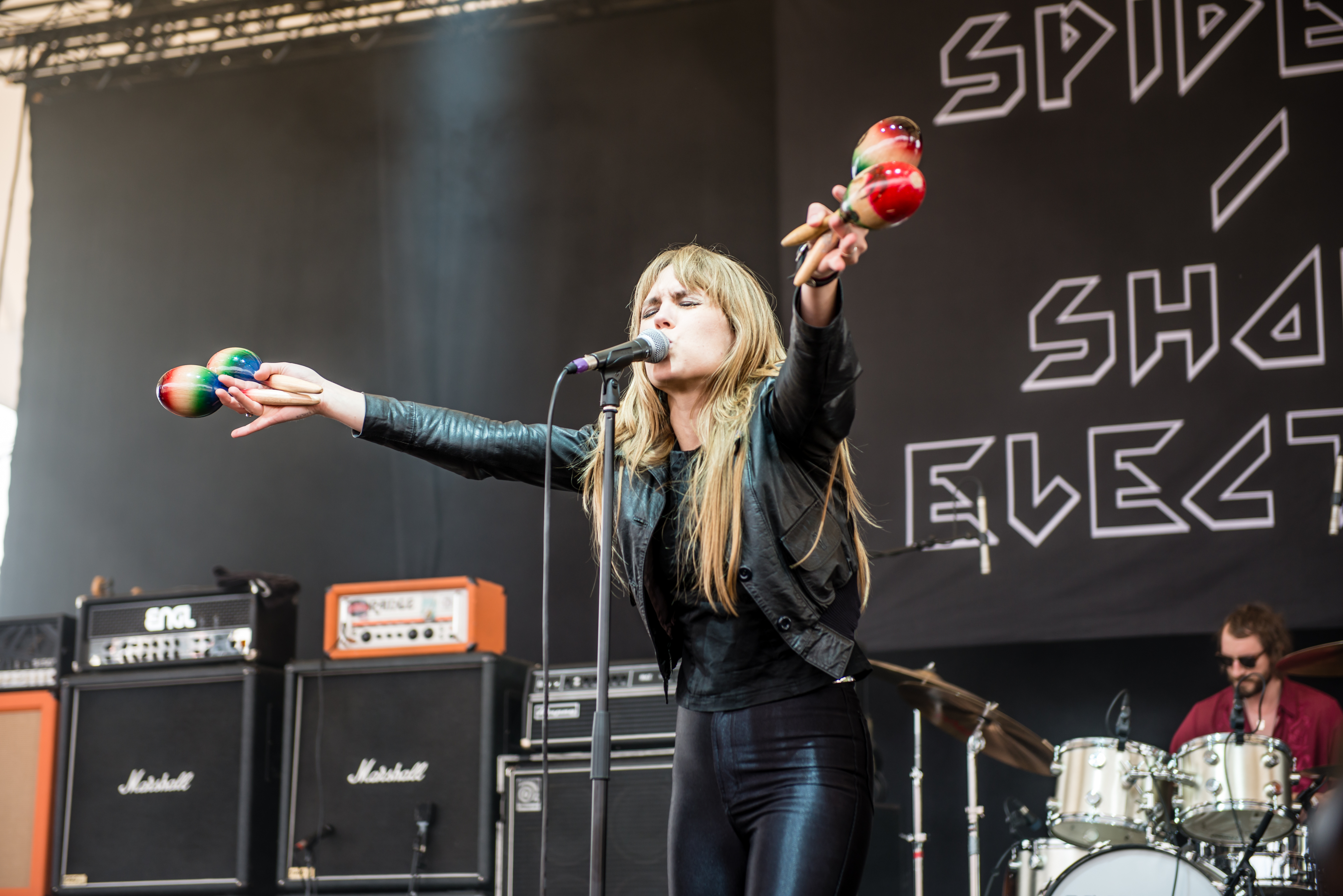

Background information
- Origin: Gothenburg, Sweden
- Genre: Rock
- Years active: 2010–present
- Labels: Crusher, Reaktor
- Members: Ann-Sofie Hoyles; John Hoyles; Olle Griphammar; Oskar Brindmark; Rickard Hellgren
- Past members: Matteo Gambacorta; Axel Sjöberg; Richard Harryson
- Website: www.wearespiders.com

Spiders is a Swedish rock band from Gothenburg featuring Ann-Sofie Hoyles, John Hoyles, Olle Griphammar and Ricard Harryson. The band has released five albums, Flash Point in October 2012, Shake Electric in 2014, Killer Machine in 2018, Sharp Objects in 2025, and Crystal Eyes in 2026.

== Discography ==
=== Albums ===
Year	Album	Peak positions
Year	Album	SWE
2012	Flash Point	52
2014	Shake Electric	7
2018	Killer Machine	17
2025	Sharp Objects	19
2026	Crystal Eyes	12
