= Al Cielo EP =

EP by Black Tide
- Released: October 8, 2011
- Recorded: May–June 2010 at Spin Studios, New York City
- Genre: Alternative metal, melodic metalcore
- Label: Interscope
- Producer: Josh Wilbur, GGGarth

Black Tide chronology
Post Mortem (2011)	Al Cielo EP (2011)	Just Another Drug (2012)

Al Cielo EP is the second EP by American heavy metal band Black Tide. It features re-recorded versions of three songs from Post Mortem with Spanish vocals. On the two latter songs, the names are changed to be in Spanish. "Let It Out" and "Into the Sky" are titled "Dejalo Salir" and "Al Cielo" respectively.

== Track listing ==
No.	Title	Length
1.	"That Fire" (Español)	3:45
2.	"Dejalo Salir" (Let It Out)	5:04
3.	"Al Cielo" (Into the Sky)	4:52

== Personnel ==
Black Tide

- Gabriel Garcia – lead vocals, lead guitar
- Austin Diaz – rhythm guitar, backing vocals
- Zakk Sandler – bass, backing vocals
- Steven Spence – drums, percussion
