= Bury Me =

Single by Black Tide

from the album Post Mortem
- B-side: "Honest Eyes"
- Released: September 17, 2010
- Recorded: May–June 2010 at Spin Studios, New York City
- Genre: Alternative metal, melodic metalcore
- Length: 3:53
- Label: Interscope
- Songwriters: Austin Diaz, Gabriel Garcia, Steven Spence, Josh Wilbur
- Producers: Josh Wilbur, GGGarth

Black Tide singles chronology
"Shout" (2008)	"Bury Me" (2010)	"Walking Dead Man" (2011)

"Bury Me" is the first single by American heavy metal band Black Tide from their second studio album, Post Mortem. It was released on September 17, 2010, and includes a B-side called "Honest Eyes", which was also released as a stand-alone digital single. Both of the songs were written some band members and Josh Wilbur and produced by Wilbur and GGGarth.

== Music video ==
On December 20, 2010, the band released the music video for the song. It contains live footage shot by the band during their fall 2010 tour. On the same day, the band also released a similar live video for their old single "Warriors of Time" from their previous album Light from Above.

== Live performance ==
The song was performed live for the first time on September 24, 2010, at the Fillmore in Charlotte, North Carolina, while supporting Bullet for My Valentine. On that night, the band also played another new song called "Let It Out".

== Sound ==
The sound is much different from the band's previous album Light from Above. This can be heard mostly due to Gabriel Garcia's change in vocal style, which is now much darker. The speed metal influence is no longer present, and the sound is more melodic, heavier and a bit slower than the previous album. It also features metalcore elements such as a breakdown and screamed vocals.

== Trivia ==
- It is the first Black Tide single to include rhythm guitarist Austin Diaz.
- The song's working title was "Austin's Nightmare".

== Track listing ==
=== CD single ===
No.	Title	Writer(s)	Length
1.	"Bury Me"	Austin Diaz, Gabriel Garcia, Steven Spence, Josh Wilbur	3:53
2.	"Honest Eyes"	Gabriel Garcia, Steven Spence, Josh Wilbur	3:58
Total length:			7:11

=== Digital single ===
No.	Title	Writer(s)	Length
1.	"Bury Me"	Austin Diaz, Gabriel Garcia, Steven Spence, Josh Wilbur	3:53
Total length:			3:53

== Charts ==
Chart (2011)	Peak position
US Billboard Hot Singles Sales	8

== Personnel ==
- Gabriel Garcia: vocals, lead guitar
- Austin Diaz: rhythm guitar, backing vocals
- Zakk Sandler: bass, vocals
- Steven Spence: drums, percussion
