= Post Mortem (Black Tide album) =

Studio album by Black Tide
- Released: August 23, 2011
- Recorded: May–June 2010 at Spin Studios, New York City
- Genre: Alternative metal, melodic metalcore
- Length: 42:58
- Label: Interscope
- Producer: Josh Wilbur, GGGarth

Black Tide chronology
Light from Above (2008)	Post Mortem (2011)	Chasing Shadows (2015)

Singles from Post Mortem
- 1. "Bury Me" Released: September 10, 2010; 2. "Walking Dead Man" Released: May 23, 2011; 3. "That Fire" Released: June 21, 2011

Professional ratings
Review scores
Source	Rating
AllMusic	3/5 stars
Revolver	3.5/5 stars
Spin	5/10 stars

Post Mortem is the second album by the American heavy metal band Black Tide, released on August 23, 2011. It was produced by Josh Wilbur and GGGarth. It is the band's first album to feature guitarist Austin Diaz, after the departure of Alex Nuñez in 2008.

== Recording, release and promotion ==
The album was originally intended to be self-titled and was set for release in February 2011, but it was later announced that the album would be titled Post Mortem and the release date would be pushed back to August 23, 2011. To date, three singles have been released, along with an additional promotional digital single.

The songs "That Fire", "Let It Out" and "Into the Sky" were featured on the Al Cielo EP as Spanish re-recordings with alternative names.

"Honest Eyes" is featured on the soundtrack and opening cinematic for the 2012 video game Street Fighter X Tekken.

"That Fire" is featured on the soundtrack of EA Sports' NHL 12 and is played before any game the player manually plays.

=== Singles ===
On September 17, 2010, the band released the first single off the album – "Bury Me" for digital download and on a CD single. The CD single featured a b-side, entitled "Honest Eyes", which was later released as a stand-alone digital only single.
The second official single from the album, "Walking Dead Man", was released digitally on May 23, 2011. A music video soon followed on June 14, 2011. The third single from the album, entitled "That Fire" was released on June 21, 2011 and a music video for the song followed on June 23, 2011.

The band has also released acoustic versions of the songs "That Fire" and "Fight 'Til the Bitter End" via their YouTube account.

=== Sales ===
During its first week on sale, Post Mortem sold about 5,800 copies, landing it at number 73 on the Billboard 200 chart which was the same as their previous album Light from Above.

== Track listing ==
No.	Title	Writer(s)	Length
1.	"Ashes" (featuring Matt Tuck)	Austin Diaz, Gabriel Garcia, Josh Wilbur	4:09
2.	"Bury Me"	Diaz, Garcia, Steven Spence, Wilbur	3:53
3.	"Let It Out"	Garcia, Zach Sandler	5:06
4.	"Honest Eyes"	Garcia, Spence, Wilbur	3:57
5.	"That Fire"	Garcia, Spence, Wilbur	3:30
6.	"Fight 'Til the Bitter End"	Dave Bassett, Diaz, Garcia, James Scheffer, Steven Spence	3:44
7.	"Take It Easy"	Garcia	4:34
8.	"Lost in the Sound"	Garcia, Spence	4:59
9.	"Walking Dead Man"	Garcia, Spence, Wilbur	4:15
10.	"Into the Sky"	Garcia	4:52
Total length:			42:58

Amazon bonus track
No.	Title	Writer(s)	Length
11.	"Part of It"	Garcia, Wilbur	4:03
Total length:			47:01

iTunes bonus track
No.	Title	Writer(s)	Length
11.	"So Broken"	Garcia, Wilbur	6:42
Total length:			49:40

UK bonus tracks
No.	Title	Writer(s)	Length
11.	"Alone"	Diaz, Garcia, Spence	3:35
12.	"Give Hope"	Garcia, Wilbur	4:51
Total length:			51:24

== Personnel ==
Black Tide

- Gabriel Garcia – lead vocals, lead guitar
- Austin Diaz – rhythm guitar, backing vocals
- Zakk Sandler – bass, backing vocals
- Steven Spence – drums, percussion

Production

- Garth "GGGarth" Richardson – production
- Josh Wilbur – additional production

Additional personnel

- Matthew Tuck – vocals on "Ashes"
