= The Lighthouse and the Whaler =

American indie rock band

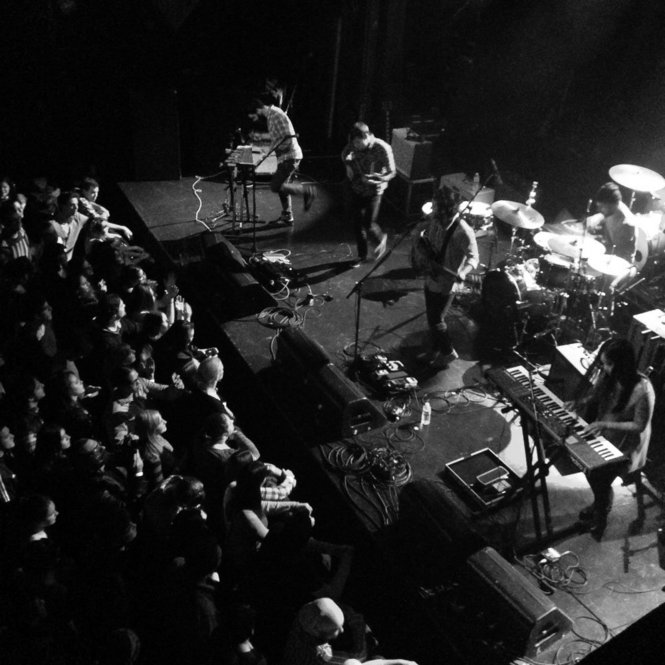
- The Lighthouse and the Whaler at Webster Hall in February 2013

Background information
- Origin: Cleveland, Ohio, U.S.
- Genre: Indie rock
- Years active: 2008–present
- Members: Michael LoPresti; Matthew LoPresti; Mark Porostosky; Ryan Walker
- Past members: Aaron Smith (el trancabaños); Evan Storey; Steve Diaz
- Website: thelighthouseandthewhaler.com

The Lighthouse and the Whaler is an American band from Cleveland, Ohio. Originally a folk rock trio, they eventually became a rock quartet. The group's second album, This is an Adventure, was produced by Ryan Hadlock and independently released in 2012 and received critical praise for its genre-bending melodic folk.

== History ==
=== Early years and formation (2008–11) ===
The Lighthouse and the Whaler was formed by vocalist and guitarist Michael LoPresti in 2008. The name was inspired by Chapter 14 of Herman Melville's Moby Dick. "The Field Song", the band's first song, was a result of spontaneous collaboration that took place between Lopresti and former band members Aaron Smith and Evan Storey in a field when they were first starting. Soon after "The Field Song" was selected for the acclaimed Paste Magazine Sampler CD in Issue 29. In November 2009, the band co-produced and self-released its debut album, The Lighthouse and the Whaler, working with producer and musician, Dave Douglas, at his home studio. The band supported the release with a performance at SXSW 2010 and The Rock and Roll Hall of Fame, as well as tours and opening slots for bands like The Temper Trap, GIVERS and Motion City Soundtrack. Later in 2010 the band was named the "Best Indie" act in Cleveland by Cleveland Scene Magazine and was featured as a band of the month by BMI. That album went on to receive more attention from Paste, KEXP and Daytrotter.

=== This is an Adventure (2011–2014) ===
In August 2011, the band began recording This is an Adventure at Bear Creek Studios in Washington, where The Lumineers, Brandi Carlile, The Walkmen and Ra Ra Riot had previously recorded. The group lived in the barn attached to the studio while making the record under the production of Hadlock.

A three-song Pioneers EP was released in March 2012, in anticipation of This is an Adventure, which followed in September 2012. Released independently, the album was the second highest ranking DIY album on the CMJ 200 in 2012 and received attention from NPR World Cafe, Paste, FILTER, Daytrotter, Under the Radar magazine and others. Music from the album was featured on Gossip Girl, CSI:NY, Emily Owens MD and other shows.

In support of the album, The Lighthouse and the Whaler toured North America with Jukebox the Ghost, Matt Pond PA, Ra Ra Riot and Ewert and the Two Dragons, performing at CMJ Pop! Montreal, NXNE, SXSW and FILTER Culture Collide Festival. During Culture Collide, the band won Peter Gabriel's cover song contest to celebrate the 20th anniversary of So. This is an Adventure debuted on the Billboard Heatseekers chart in March 2013. Due to the success of This is an Adventure the band released the Venice Remix EP on June 10, 2014, featuring remixes from Savior Adore, Chancellor Warhol and Adam Snow as well as a new radio edit of Venice. The band supported the release of the EP with a national tour supporting Matt Pond PA and additional dates with Run River North on either side of its release date.

=== Mont Royal (2015–present) ===
In January 2015, The Lighthouse and the Whaler started recording its third album, Mont Royal, in Montreal, Quebec, Canada. The album was produced and mixed by Marcus Paquin, who previously worked with Local Natives, Arcade Fire and The National. It was released on August 28, 2015, by Roll Call Records in the United States of America and Fontana North in Canada. It was released by Smack Face Records in Australia and New Zealand. The first single, "I Want to Feel Alive," included a music video featuring Holland Roden of MTV's Teen Wolf.

=== Albums ===
- The Lighthouse and the Whaler (2009)
- This is an Adventure (2012)
- Mont Royal (2015)
- Talk (2021)

=== EPs ===
- A Whisper, a Clamour EP (2008)
- Pioneers EP (2012)
- Venice Remix EP (2014)
- Paths EP (2017)
