= Kiss This (The Struts song) =

Single by the Struts

from the album Everybody Wants
- Released: 7 April 2014
- Genre: Hard rock; blues rock; glam rock
- Length: 2:57
- Label: Interscope
- Songwriter(s): Rick Parkhouse, Adam Slack, Luke Spiller, George Tizzard, Josh Wilkinson
- Producer(s): Red Triangle

The Struts singles chronology
"Could Have Been Me" (2013)	"Kiss This" (2014)	"Put Your Money on Me" (2014)

"Kiss This" is a song by English glam rock band the Struts. It was released April 7, 2014, as the second single from their debut studio album Everybody Wants. The song began to climb the charts in America in 2015 and 2016 causing an increase in popularity. Lyrically, the song recalls a personal experience of lead vocalist Luke Spiller, whose girlfriend at the time had been cheating on him with one of his close friends. He was not particularly fond of the idea of the song indulging in self-pity. Instead, the band uses power riffs and an in-your-face chorus. Due to this shift in perspective, the song became a liberating anthem about standing up on your own two feet. The band describes "Kiss This" as having a typical rock and roll progression. For the song, the band took the feeling of the Rolling Stones' song "Sympathy for the Devil" and mixed a hip-hop element in it. The band believes the song is their version of a ‘Young Hearts Run Free’-type song but in a rock mentality.

== Music video ==
The second music video was released on 8 February 2016.

== Charts ==
=== Weekly charts ===
Chart (2016–17)	Peak position
Canada Rock (Billboard)	2
Japan Hot Overseas (Billboard)	18
US Hot Rock & Alternative Songs (Billboard)	25
US Rock & Alternative Airplay (Billboard)	11

=== Year-end charts ===
Chart (2016)	Position
US Hot Rock Songs (Billboard)	54
US Rock Airplay (Billboard)	29
