= The Colourist =

American rock band

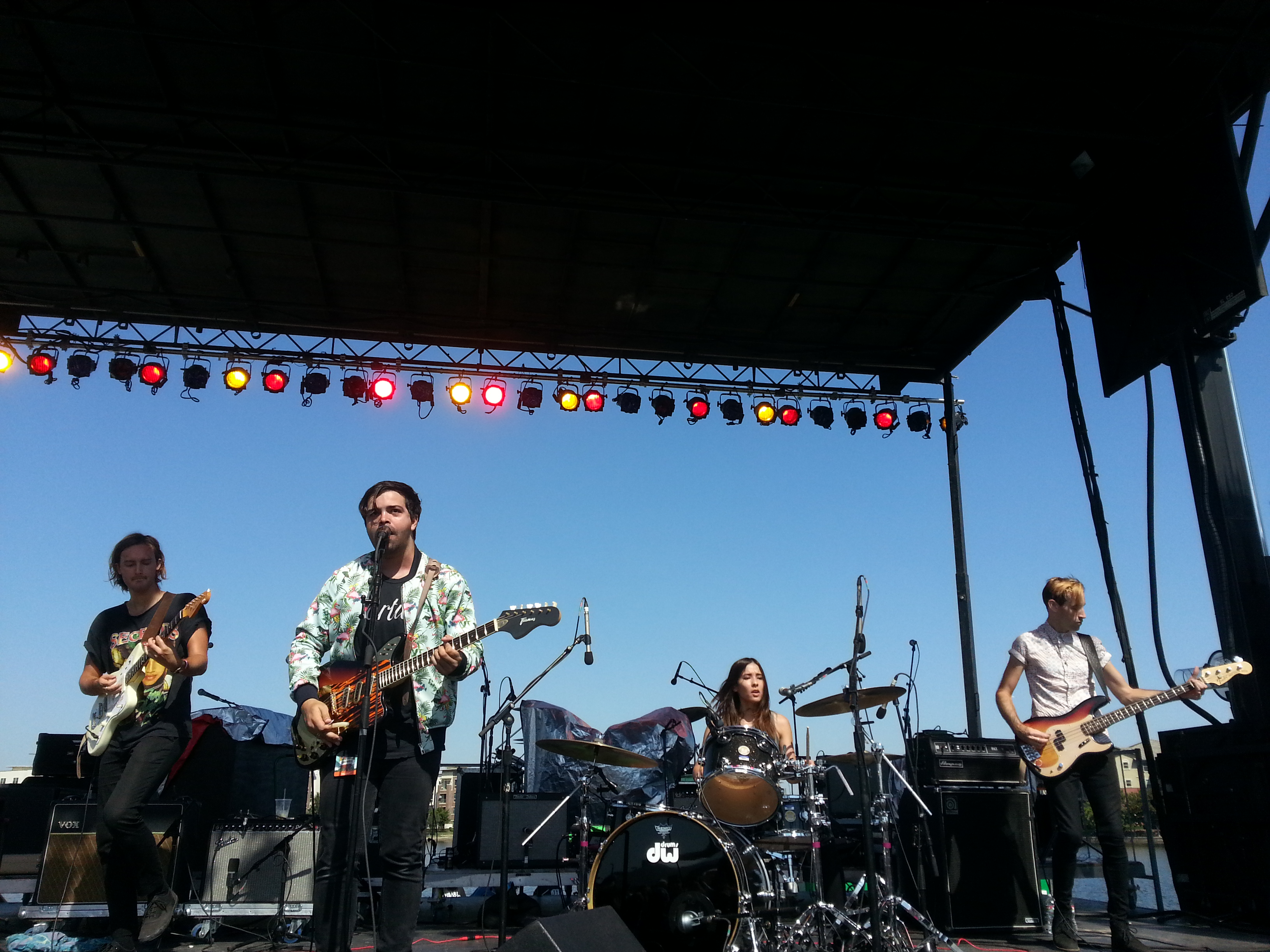

Background information
- Origin: Orange County, California, U.S.
- Genres: Indie pop, indie rock, power pop
- Years active: 2009–2016, 2021
- Members: Adam Castilla; Justin Wagner
- Past members: Kollin Johannsen; Maya Aoki Tuttle
- Website: thecolouristmusic.com

The Colourist was an American rock band from Orange County, California, formed in 2009 by Adam Castilla, Maya Aoki Tuttle, Justin Wagner, and Kollin Johannsen. The band had been inactive since Aoki Tuttle's departure in December 2016; a social media post in late 2021 hinted at the band resuming activity, but they have not released any new music since the announcement.

== History ==
=== 2007–2012: Beginnings ===
Castilla and Aoki Tuttle met while performing in the band Paper Thin Walls, who rose to notoriety after being chosen to play the 2007 Led Zeppelin reunion concert in London. The name "The Colourist" was borne out of a conversation with a friend of the band—a film student working with a film colorist at the time. Because the name was not already used, the ensemble decided to use the British/Canadian spelling for aesthetic and availability reasons.

After years of performing concerts in their hometown, the ensemble captured the eyes of major record labels during their residency at Los Angeles' Bootleg Theater. In July 2012, the band signed a record contract with Universal Republic Records.

In 2013, the band's debut single "Little Games" became the No.1 song on Hype Machine.

=== 2012–2014: Debut EP and studio albums ===
In late 2012 and early 2013, the ensemble spent five months in Eagle Rock, California recording fourteen songs with producer Carlos De La Garza, twelve of which went on the full-length studio album. Weeks after the recording was complete, the quartet performed at Coachella Valley Music and Arts Festival in Indio, California. On August 20, 2013, the band released their debut EP Lido.

On March 25, 2014, The Colourist also released their debut studio album, The Colourist.

=== 2014–2015: Inversions and Will You Wait for Me ===
In October 2014, the ensemble released their first remix EP entitled Inversions.

On March 5, 2015, radio station KSRY FM in Los Angeles published the single "When I'm Away." Laura Neumayer of The Eagle Online describes the song as "complete with a groovy guitar riff reminiscent of The Lighthouse and the Whaler's "Venice."

On May 25, 2015, "When I'm Away" was featured as the theme song on a television commercial for Hulu. At that time, it was announced that the tune will be featured on Will You Wait for Me, the third EP from the ensemble.

On July 23, 2015, "Romancing" was released streaming on several outlets, including indieshuffle.com, as the 2nd single from the EP.

On November 9, 2015, the group announced via their Facebook page that they are working on new music, with a subsequent post early the next year that Johannsen and the ensemble would be parting ways.

=== 2016–2020: Hiatus and side projects ===
On December 18, 2016, the group announced Aoki Tuttle's departure from the band. Following it, the band went on a hiatus from 2016 through 2021.

=== 2021: Reunion and recent developments ===
On November 2, 2021, the band announced on their Twitter page they've reunited, and in December 2021, they revealed they are in the studio working on new music. On June 3, 2022, Aoki Tuttle confirmed on Twitter that her departure was so that she could pursue voice acting and still maintains a closeness with the band. She further hinted at "surprises" with the group in the future, implying a possible future collaboration. The tweet has since been deleted.

== Appearances ==
=== Television appearances ===
In 2013, The Colourist starred in a national commercial and ad campaign for Nokia, which aired on primetime television for three months. The commercial featured the band playing their single "Little Games" to a packed audience at LA's Opheum Theater.

In March 2014, the band's sold-out performance at The Troubadour in LA was featured on Last Call With Carson Daly

On May 21, 2014, The Colourist appeared on The Late Late Show with Craig Ferguson to perform their 2nd single "We Won't Go Home".

=== Other appearances ===
"Little Games" is a playable song in Activision's 2015 game Guitar Hero Live. It also featured with the St. Lucia remix version in the EA Sports game FIFA 14.

== Band members ==
=== Current members ===
- Adam Castilla – lead vocals, guitar (2009–present)
- Justin Wagner – keyboard (2009–present)

=== Former members ===
- Kollin Johannsen – Bass guitar (2009–2016)
- Maya Aoki Tuttle – drums/lead vocals (2009–2016)

== Discography ==
=== Studio albums ===
Year	Album details	Peak chart positions		
Year	Album details	US	US Alt.	US Rock
2014	The Colourist: Released: March 25, 2014; Label: Republic Records, Universal Records	82	15	18
"—" denotes a release that did not chart.

=== Charting singles ===
Title	Year	Peak chart positions
Title	Year	Alternative Songs
"Little Games"	2013	31

=== Extended plays ===
Year	Album details	Peak chart positions
Year	Album details	US Heat.
2013	Lido: Released: August 20, 2013; Label: Republic Records, Universal Records	16
2014	Inversions: Released: October 28, 2014; Label: Republic Records	—
2015	Will You Wait for Me: Released: July 31, 2015; Label: Independent	—
"—" denotes a release that did not chart.

== Trivia ==
In October 2015, Aoki Tuttle recorded the song "Back 2 U" with Raeko (the alter ego of Jason Suwito from Sir Sly).
