= Shockwave (Black Tide song) =

- Cover of the CD single

Single by Black Tide

from the album Light from Above
- Released: 2007
- Recorded: 2007
- Genre: Heavy metal
- Length: 3:36
- Label: Interscope
- Songwriters: Gabriel Garcia, Alexander Nuñez, Raul Garcia Jr.
- Producer: Johnny K

Black Tide singles chronology
"Shockwave" (2007)	"Warriors of Time" (2008)

"Shockwave" is a song by American heavy metal band Black Tide. It is credited to Gabriel Garcia, Alexander Nuñez and Raul Garcia Jr. It was the first track and first single from their 2008 debut album Light from Above, with the other two singles being "Warriors of Time" and "Shout". It was released before the album. The CD single was the band's first official release and is also known as the Black Tide EP. The single version is a clean edit of the song, the word "fuck" that is mentioned in the chorus is removed.

It is one of the band's most famous songs and is played live on almost all of the band's concerts; it was also performed on Jimmy Kimmel Live! on March 27, 2008. It charted in the U.S. at number 25.

== Music video ==
Two music videos were made for the song and both were aired on MTV2's Headbangers Ball.

- The first was directed by Travis Kopach and features the band playing and trashing a house along with some fans. Later, the police comes and everybody escapes the house. At the beginning, vocalist/guitarist Gabriel Garcia hangs in a lamp from the ceiling. That picture later became the cover for their EP Road Warrior.
- A second video was also made and is a compilation of live scenes from Ozzfest 2007 and backstage footage. It was directed by Jason Bergh.

== In popular culture ==
- "Shockwave" is featured on the PlayStation 3 and Xbox 360 video game Skate 2, the North American version of Guitar Hero: Modern Hits, and as a downloadable song for the PlayStation 3, Wii, and Xbox 360 versions of Rock Band.

== Track listing ==
=== CD single ===
No.	Title	Writer(s)	Length
1.	"Shockwave"	Gabriel Garcia, Alexander Nuñez, Raul Garcia Jr.	3:48
2.	"Warriors of Time"	Gabriel Garcia	4:59
Total length:			8:47

=== Digital single ===
No.	Title	Writer(s)	Length
1.	"Shockwave"	Gabriel Garcia, Alexander Nuñez, Raul Garcia Jr.	3:23

=== Black Tide EP ===
Director: Jason Bergh

No.	Title	Writer(s)	Length
1.	"Shockwave"	Gabriel Garcia, Alexander Nuñez, Raul Garcia Jr.	3:39
2.	"Black Abyss"	Gabriel Garcia, Jason Suecof, Raul Garcia Jr.	4:07
3.	"Warriors of Time"	Gabriel Garcia	5:53
4.	"Black Widow"	Gabriel Garcia, Jason Suecof	3:35
5.	"Shockwave" (music video)	Gabriel Garcia, Alexander Nuñez, Raul Garcia Jr.	3:48

== Chart positions ==
Chart (2008)	Peak position
U.S. Hot Mainstream Rock Tracks	25

== Personnel ==
- Gabriel Garcia: vocals, lead guitar
- Alex Nuñez: rhythm guitar, backing vocals
- Zakk Sandler: bass, backing vocals
- Steven Spence: drums, percussion
