= Steven Spence =

American drummer

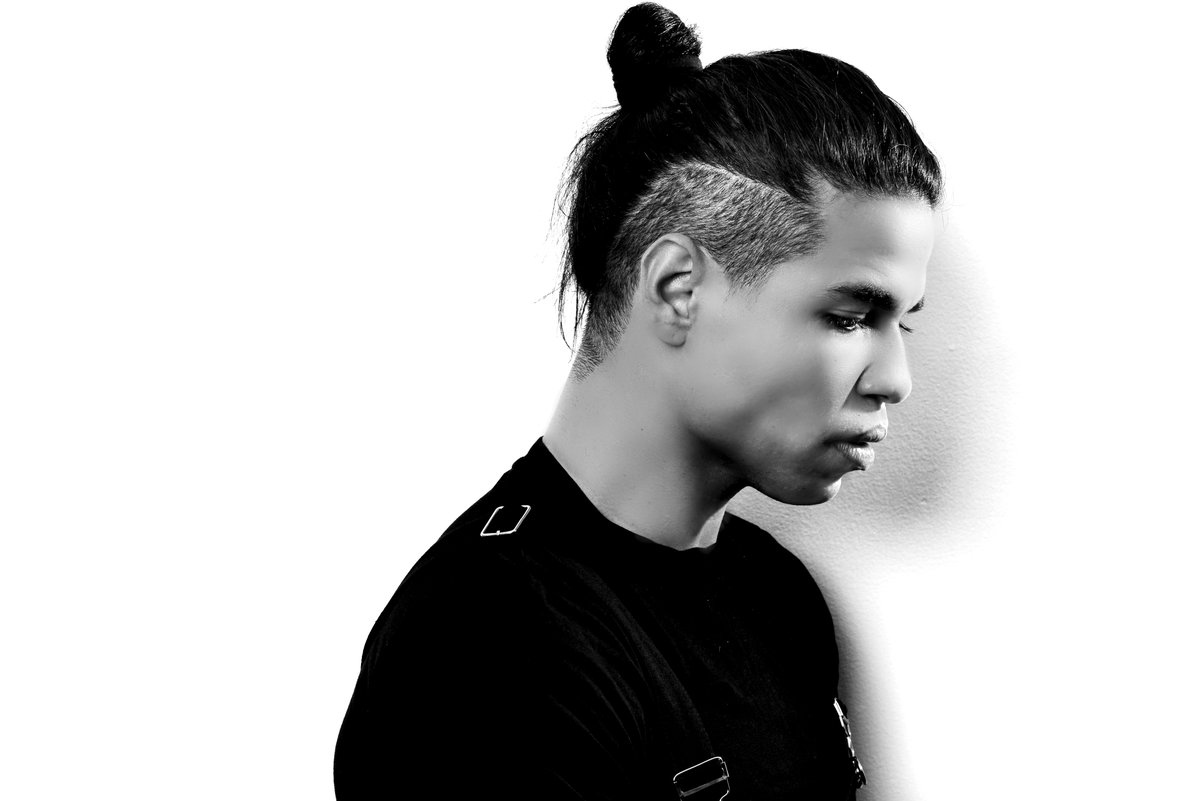

Background information
- Origin: United States
- Genres: Heavy metal, metalcore
- Occupation: Musician
- Instruments: Drums, keyboards
- Years active: 2007–present
- Formerly of: Black Tide
- Website: iamstevenspence.com

Steven Spence is an American musician. He often appears in Instagram video skits with other Internet personalities such as Lele Pons, Jason Neubauer and King Bach. From 2007 to 2012, he was the drummer for the heavy metal band Black Tide.

== Career ==
Spence grew up playing guitar and piano, which he taught himself to play by ear. He was mentored by his uncle who played keyboards with the reggae band The Wailers. Spence got his first drum kit in 2001 and taught himself how to play. He was accepted and enrolled in Florida State University in Tallahassee. When he auditioned for the heavy metal band Black Tide, in 2007, he quit school to tour Ozzfest and record the group's debut album Light from Above in Chicago.

In 2009, Spence was selected as an "Up and Coming" artist in the Modern Drummer readers' poll. The same year, he won first place at the Vans Warped Tour Drum-Off. When playing live with Black Tide, Spence would play the drums and keyboard simultaneously. He also recorded keyboards and piano on various songs including "Into the Sky" on Post Mortem and the title track on Light from Above. In 2012, he left Black Tide to work on other projects.

Spence is also a DJ and composer. He has worked with bands including The Mowgli's and Kalin and Myles. In 2014, he collaborated as a songwriter with Clinton Sparks, The Mowgli's and Kylie Morgan on the song "I'm Good". The song was written to be an anthem for the Band Together Project, an initiative created to end bullying.

== Filmography ==
=== Films ===
| Year | Title | Role | Note |
|---|---|---|---|
| 2017 | How to Be a Latin Lover | Cameo | Hoverboard Thief |

=== Music videos ===
| Year | Title | Artist | Role |
|---|---|---|---|
| 2017 | "Pillow Talking" | Lil Dicky | Native American |
| 2016 | "If It Feels Right" | Steven Spence | Producer, vocals, performer |
| 2011 | "That Fire" | Black Tide | Drummer |
| 2011 | "Walking Dead Man" | Black Tide | Drummer |
| 2011 | "Fight 'Til the Bitter End" | Black Tide | Drummer |
| 2011 | "Bury Me" | Black Tide | Drummer |
| 2009 | "Shockwave" | Black Tide | Drummer |
| 2008 | "Warriors of Time" | Black Tide | Drummer |
| 2008 | "Shout" | Black Tide | Drummer |
