= Everybody Wants =

2014 debut studio album by The Struts

Studio album by The Struts
- Released: 28 July 2014; 4 March 2016 (reissue); 3 February 2017 (Japan)
- Recorded: 2010–2015
- Genre: Glam rock; pop-punk
- Length: 36:26
- Label: Virgin EMI; FreeSolo; Interscope (reissue)
- Producer: Ray Hedges

The Struts chronology
Kiss This EP (2014)	Everybody Wants (2014)	Have You Heard... (2015)

2016 re-release cover

The Struts studio album chronology
Everybody Wants (2014)	Young & Dangerous (2018)

Singles from Everybody Wants
- 1. "Could Have Been Me" Released: 21 October 2013; 2. "Kiss This" Released: 7 April 2014; 3. "Put Your Money on Me" Released: 1 June 2014; 4. "Put Your Hands Up" Released: 1 August 2016 (Japanese edition)

Professional ratings
Review scores
Source	Rating
Virgin Media	4/5 stars
AllMusic	4/5 stars

Everybody Wants is the debut studio album from British glam rock band The Struts. It was first released on 28 July 2014 and reached 52 on the United Kingdom album charts.

== Re-issue ==
After touring North America in the latter half of 2015 promoting their Have You Heard EP, The Struts announced that they would be releasing their U.S. debut, a re-release of their original album with new tracks, to be released on FreeSolo and Interscope Records.

Through an Instagram post by Luke Spiller and a tweet by Gethin Davies, it was confirmed that this release of Everybody Wants will feature new tracks, plus remastered or rerecordings of most of the songs off the original 2014 release. It ended up being five new tracks ("Mary Go Round," "The Ol' Switcheroo," "Young Stars," "These Times are Changing" and "Only Just a Call Away"), three from the original release were dropped ("My Machine," "You & I" and "Let's Make This Happen Tonight") and one, "She Makes Me Feel," was retitled to "She Makes Me Feel Like." The songs "Roll Up", "Could Have Been Me", "Kiss This", "Put Your Money On Me" and "She Makes Me Feel" were re-recorded. While keeping the original album's title, the reissue has different cover art.

== Track listing ==
No.	Title	Writer(s)	Producer(s)	Length
1.	"Roll Up"	Luke Spiller; Adam Slack; Nigel Butler; Ray Hedges	Butler; Hedges	3:08
2.	"Could Have Been Me"	Spiller; Slack; Rick Parkhouse; George Tizzard; Josh Wilkinson	Red Triangle	3:07
3.	"Kiss This"	Spiller; Slack; Parkhouse; Tizzard; Wilkinson	Red Triangle	2:57
4.	"Put Your Money on Me"	Spiller; Slack; Gregg Alexander; Nick Southwood	Butler; Hedges	3:35
5.	"She Makes Me Feel"	Spiller; Slack; Parkhouse; Tizzard; Wilkinson	Red Triangle	2:38
6.	"My Machine"	Spiller; Slack; Butler; Hedges	Butler; Hedges	3:08
7.	"You & I"	Spiller; Slack; Parkhouse; Tizzard; Wilkinson	Red Triangle	3:24
8.	"Dirty Sexy Money"	Spiller; Slack; Butler; Hedges	Butler; Hedges	3:57
9.	"Let's Make This Happen Tonight"	Spiller; Slack	Butler; Hedges	3:17
10.	"Black Swan"	Spiller; Slack	Butler; Hedges	3:24
11.	"Where Did She Go"	Spiller; Laurence Matone	Butler; Hedges	3:53
Total length:				36:28

Everybody Wants: Reissue (2016)
No.	Title	Writer(s)	Producer(s)	Length
1.	"Roll Up" (Remaster)			3:07
2.	"Could Have Been Me" (Remaster)			3:07
3.	"Kiss This" (Remaster)			2:57
4.	"Put Your Money on Me" (Ash Howes Mix)			3:33
5.	"Mary Go Round"	Spiller; Slack; Marti Frederiksen	Frederiksen	3:19
6.	"Dirty Sexy Money"			3:57
7.	"The Ol' Switcheroo"	Spiller; Slack; Alexander; Nick Lashley	Alexander	3:42
8.	"She Makes Me Feel Like" (Remaster)			2:38
9.	"Young Stars"	Spiller; Slack; Butler; Hedges	Butler; Hedges	3:23
10.	"Black Swan"			3:24
11.	"These Times Are Changing"	Spiller; Slack; Dave Bassett	Chris Lord-Alge	3:26
12.	"Only Just a Call Away"	Spiller; Slack; Wilkinson; Parkhouse; Tizzard	Red Triangle	3:04
13.	"Where Did She Go"			3:54

Everybody Wants: Japanese Edition (2017)
No.	Title	Writer(s)	Producer(s)	Length
14.	"Put Your Hands Up"	Spiller; Slack; Butler; Hedges	Butler; Hedges	3:01
15.	"My Machine"	Spiller; Slack; Butler; Hedges	Butler; Hedges	3:08
16.	"We Will Rock You"	Brian May	Butler; Hedges	2:22
17.	"Kiss This" (Acoustic)	Spiller; Slack; Parkhouse; Tizzard; Wilkinson	Red Triangle	3:01
18.	"Could Have Been Me" (Live from Summer Sonic)	Spiller; Slack; Parkhouse; Tizzard; Wilkinson	Red Triangle	3:58

== Charts ==
Chart (2016)	Peak position
Canadian Albums (Billboard)	68
UK Albums (OCC)	52
UK Album Downloads (OCC)	90
US Billboard 200	99
