= Light from Above =

Studio album by Black Tide
- Released: March 18, 2008
- Recorded: Late 2007
- Genre: Heavy metal
- Length: 45:04; 48:42 (UK); 48:22 (iTunes); 47:48 (Hot Topic)
- Label: Interscope
- Producer: Johnny K

Black Tide chronology
Light from Above (2008)	Post Mortem (2011)

Singles from Light from Above
- 1. "Shockwave" Released: 2008; 2. "Warriors of Time" Released: 2008; 3. "Shout" Released: 2008

Professional ratings
Review scores
Source	Rating
AllMusic	3.5/5 stars
Dangerdog Music Reviews	4.75/5
IGN	7.4/10
Sounds Of Rock	8.5/10 stars

Light from Above is the debut album by American heavy metal band Black Tide. It was released on March 18, 2008, and was produced by Johnny K. Each member of Black Tide was under 20 years of age during the recording of this album, making it very notable in the music industry. Frontman Gabriel Garcia was only a high school freshman and 14 years old when the album was written and recorded.

The album was praised by critics and helped them win the 2008 Kerrang! Awards for "Best International Newcomer". It debuted at number 73 on the Billboard 200, with 11,400 copies sold in its first week of sales.

Three singles were released from the album, "Shockwave", "Warriors of Time", and "Shout", respectively. Two music videos were produced for "Shockwave" and have aired on MTV2's Headbangers Ball. The album features a Metallica cover of the song "Hit the Lights" from their debut album Kill 'Em All.

== Light from Above Tour ==
In support of the album the band toured from July 2007 to April 2011. The tour included 341 concerts around the world with headlining shows, festival dates like the Vans Warped Tour, Download Festival and Mayhem Festival. They also performed as an opening act for bands like Iron Maiden, Avenged Sevenfold, Bullet for My Valentine and Trivium. The last show was on April 19 at The Viper Room in Los Angeles, California as an opening act for Loaded.

== Track listing ==
No.	Title	Writer(s)	Length
1.	"Shockwave"	Garcia, Nuñez, Raul Garcia Jr.	3:38
2.	"Shout"	Garcia, Jason Suecof	3:25
3.	"Warriors of Time"	Garcia, Garcia	5:53
4.	"Give Me a Chance"	Garcia, Suecof, Sandler	3:34
5.	"Let Me"	Garcia, Suecof	3:30
6.	"Show Me the Way"	Garcia, Suecof	3:59
7.	"Enterprise"	Garcia, Johnny K.	4:31
8.	"Live Fast Die Young"	Garcia, Suecof	3:01
9.	"Hit the Lights" (Metallica cover)	Hetfield, Ulrich	3:42
10.	"Black Abyss"	Garcia, Suecof, Garcia Jr.	4:06
11.	"Light from Above"	Garcia, Spence	5:46
Total length:			45:04

UK bonus track
No.	Title	Writer(s)	Length
12.	"Black Widow"	Garcia, Suecof	3:48

iTunes bonus track
No.	Title	Length
12.	"Again"	3:18

Hot Topic bonus track
No.	Title	Length
14.	"Rise"	2:46

Japan bonus DVD
No.	Title	Length
1.	"Shockwave Explicit Version Music Video"
2.	"Shockwave (Travis Kopach Version) Music Video"
3.	"Show Me The Way (Live)"
4.	"Lonn Friend Interview"

== Personnel ==
- Gabriel Garcia: vocals, lead guitar
- Alex Nuñez: rhythm guitar, backing vocals
- Zakk Sandler: bass, backing vocals
- Spencer O: drums, percussion
- Johnny K: production

== In popular culture ==
- "Shockwave" is featured on the PlayStation 3 and Xbox 360 video game Skate 2, the North American version of Guitar Hero: Modern Hits, and is also available as a downloadable song for the PlayStation 3, Wii, and Xbox 360 versions of Rock Band.
- "Warriors of Time" is featured on the NHL 09 Soundtrack for PlayStation 3 and Xbox 360. It is also available as a downloadable song for the PlayStation 3 and Xbox 360 versions of Rock Band. In addition, the Belleville Bulls of the Ontario Hockey League play it when a goal is scored.
- "Show Me The Way" is featured in the soundtrack for MotorStorm: Pacific Rift on the PlayStation 3, it is featured in Rock Band Unplugged, and it was released as downloadable content for the console versions of the Rock Band series.
- "Shout" is featured in the soundtrack for DiRT 2.
- British ice hockey team Whitley Warriors use "Warriors of Time" as their entrance music.
