= The Colourist (album) =

Studio album by The Colourist
- Released: 25 March 2014
- Recorded: 2013–2014
- Genre: Indie pop, indie rock, power pop
- Length: 40:22
- Label: Republic Records, Universal Records

The Colourist chronology
Lido (2013)	The Colourist (2014)	Inversions (2014)

Singles from The Colourist
- 1. "Little Games" Released: 5 March 2013; 2. "We Won't Go Home" Released: 18 February 2014

The Colourist is the self-titled debut studio album from American indie pop band The Colourist. The album was released on 25 March 2014.

== Track listing ==
All tracks are written by Adam Castilla, Kollin Johannsen, Maya Tuttle, and Justin Wagner except where noted below.

No.	Title	Writer(s)	Length
1.	"Little Games"		2:42
2.	"Wishing Wells"		4:17
3.	"We Won't Go Home"		3:12
4.	"Yes Yes"		2:56
5.	"Tonight (Young Hearts)"	Tim Pagnotta, Carlos de la Garza	3:13
6.	"Stray Away"		3:01
7.	"What Can I Say"		3:12
8.	"Say You Need Me"		3:23
9.	"Fix This"		3:45
10.	"Oh Goodbye"		3:03
11.	"Put the Fire Out"		3:08
12.	"The Further" (bonus track)		3:30
Total length:			40:22

== Charts ==
=== Album ===
Chart (2014)	Peak position
Billboard 200	82
Top Alternative Albums	15
Top Rock Albums	18

=== Singles ===
Title	Year	Peak chart positions
Title	Year	Alternative Songs
"Little Games"	2013	31

== Trivia ==
"Little Games", the debut single from the band, was featured on the AT&T Nokia Lumia 1020 commercial. "Little Games" was also featured on the video game Guitar Hero Live. It also featured with St. Lucia remix version in EA Sports football game, FIFA 14.
