= Black Tide =

American heavy metal band

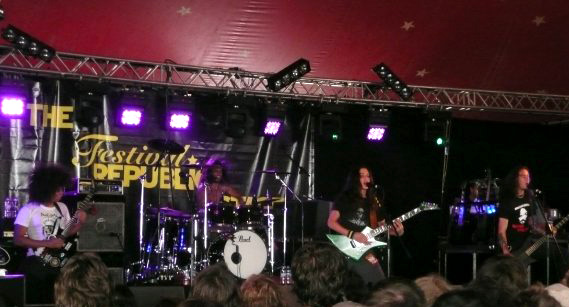
- Black Tide performing live at the Reading Festival 2008

Background information
- Also known as: Radio (2004–2007)
- Origin: Kendall, Florida, U.S.
- Genres: Heavy metal; metalcore; alternative metal
- Years active: 2004–2016; 2026–present
- Labels: Interscope, Pavement
- Members: Gabriel Garcia; Raul Garcia
- Past members: Alex Nuñez; Spencer Osborne; Austin Diaz; Tim D'Onofrio; Steven Spence; Zakk Sandler; Ronny Gutierrez; Cody Paige; Clyde Clark
- Website: www.blacktidemusic.com

Black Tide is an American heavy metal band from Kendall, Florida. Formed in 2004, the band last consisted of Gabriel Garcia (lead guitar, vocals), Austin Diaz (rhythm guitar) and Cody Paige (drums). They released their debut album, Light from Above, in 2008 through Interscope Records when Garcia was 15 years old. Their second album, Post Mortem, was released in 2011. Black Tide's EP Bite the Bullet was released in 2013 by InnerCat Music Group, a Miami-based boutique label. In 2015, the band released their last album Chasing Shadows. In July 2016, Garcia announced that the band is over and he is concentrating on his solo project. In January 2026, the band reunited, teasing new original music and old projects.

== History ==
=== Formation and signing to Interscope Records (2004–2007) ===
Black Tide was founded in Kendall, Florida in 2004 under the name "Radio" by lead guitarist Gabriel Garcia and his older brother Raul Garcia. Raul recruited rhythm guitarist Alex Nuñez and later bassist Zachary Sandler. At the time, Gabriel Garcia was 11 years old and Nuñez was just 13 years old. Garcia, Nuñez, and Sandler recruited drummer Steven Spence after Raul's departure from the group. This completed the band's lineup. The band started playing local shows, eventually gaining the attention of record labels due to the members' young age and talent. Winder Marin, the former drummer, was dropped and a replacement was brought in to keep the young image of the band.

In 2005, Black Tide signed a demo deal with Atlantic Records as Radio. The deal lasted for only a year, before the band was spotted by a record executive for EMI, who notified Interscope Records of the band. By mid-2007, now named Black Tide, they were signed to Interscope.

=== Light from Above (2007–2009) ===
The band started touring and gained a spot on the second stage of Ozzfest, but were removed from the tour because the stage was sponsored by Jägermeister and all of the members of Black Tide were under the legal drinking age. Although the band was no longer appearing on the second stage, they were able to be the opening act on the main stage in some areas, opening for Lordi, Static-X, Lamb of God, and Ozzy Osbourne. After Ozzfest, the band toured with Avenged Sevenfold and All That Remains.

In early 2007, half a year before playing Ozzfest, Black Tide entered the studio in Chicago with producer Johnny K. They recorded 12 new tracks which included a cover of Metallica's first written song, "Hit the Lights", which originally appeared on Kill 'Em All. The resulting album, Light from Above, was released on March 18, 2008. It was critically praised, with Dan Epstein of Revolver magazine saying "Listening to the debut album from Miami's Black Tide is a little like stumbling across a cool late-80s metal record you'd completely forgotten about. A very promising debut", and Scott Alisoglu of Blabbermouth.net stating the album contains "Big, sometimes pop-based, melodies meets crunchy, guitar-driven metal that falls somewhere between thrash/traditional metal and the dirtier end of '80s glam/hair metal." Light from Above debuted at number 73 on the Billboard 200, with 11,400 copies sold in its first week of sales. Black Tide also won the Kerrang! Award for Best Newcomer. On March 27, 2008, the band performed on the late-night show Jimmy Kimmel Live! on the ABC television network in the United States and Citytv in Canada.

In the summer of 2008, shortly before the Mayhem Festival, guitarist Alex Nuñez left the band and was replaced by Austin "Panix" Diaz. Diaz subsequently left his former hardcore band The Panix for Black Tide. In an odd turn of events, Alex Nuñez joined The Panix to replace Diaz. Nuñez returned to his punk roots and continues to play in many bands in Miami as a guitarist, vocalist, and drummer.

Black Tide proceeded to tour on the Mayhem Festival, playing all around the U.S. They opened for Bullet for My Valentine on their European tour in November 2008, alongside Lacuna Coil and Bleeding Through. They also supported Bullet for My Valentine on their U.S. tour in September. The band toured on the Kerrang! Relentless Energy Drink Tour with Mindless Self Indulgence, Dir En Grey, Bring Me the Horizon, and In Case of Fire. They started performing "Prowler", an Iron Maiden cover, on this tour, which was formally recorded for Kerrang! magazine's Iron Maiden tribute CD, Maiden Heaven.

The band debuted on British television on January 17, 2009, on the BBC show Sound before supporting Escape the Fate on their 2009 This War Is Ours Tour in February–March 2009. Other supporting acts included Attack Attack!, William Control, and Burn Halo. Black Tide then supported Trivium between May 6–19, 2009, on the Japanese and Australian legs of Into the Mouth of Hell We Tour. This followed a stint playing at the Warped Tour 2009, where they started performing a new song entitled "Redefine".

=== Post Mortem (2010–2012) ===
In February 2010, it was confirmed that Black Tide was in the process of writing songs for their second album. In the May/June 2010 issue of Revolver magazine, it was confirmed that Black Tide had entered the studio with the intention of finishing recording by the end of June for a fall release. On the band's Facebook profile, Zakk Sandler filmed many different one-minute videos from the studio about the work in the studio.

On July 26, 2010, Black Tide announced that they were going on tour supporting Bullet for My Valentine and Escape the Fate on their US tour in September–October 2010.

On September 17, 2010, the first single, "Bury Me", from the upcoming album was released. It also included the B-side "Honest Eyes" (which was later released as a single on its own). Following the release of the single, the band announced that the new album had a tentative release date of February 2011 through Interscope Records, and that it would be self-titled. The band was the confirmed opening act for Iron Maiden on two shows in Florida. It was also announced that they would perform at the Sonisphere Festival in Knebworth, UK, on Sunday July 10, 2011.

On April 29, 2011, Black Tide announced in an interview at the Golden Gods Awards that the name of their second album was Post Mortem. They also confirmed that the new album had been delayed until summer 2011. The video for the next single was shot in May 2011. On May 17, the band made the announcement that Post Mortem would be released on August 23. Black Tide was confirmed to perform at the 2011 Uproar Festival which featured dates in the United States and Canada. The tour started on August 26, 2011, and ended on October 15, 2011. They performed San Diego Comic-Con in July 2011. On August 10, the band released an acoustic version of the song "Let It Out" on the Revolver magazine website. The album Post Mortem leaked on the internet August 17, 2011, and was released later on August 23, selling 5,800 copies in the United States in its first week to land at a positioned number 73 on the Billboard 200 chart.

The band was part of the Uproar Festival along with bands Sevendust, Escape the Fate, Bullet for My Valentine, Seether, Three Days Grace, and Avenged Sevenfold. During the final two weeks of Uproar, bassist Zakk Sandler filled in for touring mates Escape the Fate while their bassist Max Green left to take care of a DUI but failed to return.

On October 8, the band released a digital EP titled the Al Cielo EP, which is Spanish for "To the Sky EP". It featured Spanish re-recordings of songs "That Fire", "Let It Out", and "Into the Sky" with alternative names. They were to perform five dates in Australia as a part of the Soundwave Festival in February and March 2012 but canceled the tour for undisclosed reasons.

The band has also released acoustic versions of the songs "That Fire" and "Fight 'Til the Bitter End" via their YouTube account.

On March 23, 2012 the band appeared at the Vive Latino Festival in Mexico City in front of 120,000 people.

=== Just Another Drug (2012) ===
On July 11, 2012 Gabriel Garcia announced that the band had recorded a new untitled EP, and that mixing and artwork was all that was left. A week later, the band stated that the title of the EP would be Just Another Drug, and that it would be released on August 21 due to the artwork issues. On August 24, the band released an acoustic version of the song "Start Over" via their YouTube page.

On October 13, it was confirmed on Gabriel Garcia's Twitter that the band was working on demos for their next album.

On March 22, 2013, bassist Zakk Sandler gave an interview with The Vinnie Langdon Show, stating that band was "on hiatus, for lack of a better word" and that they were currently not doing anything together. He also stated that he was not invited to be a part of the Just Another Drug EP.

=== Departure of Steven Spence and Zakk Sandler and Bite the Bullet (2013) ===
On May 20, 2013, drummer Steven Spence announced his departure from the band. He stated on his Twitter account: "I was waiting for an announcement of my replacement but it's about time I let you all know that I will no longer be in Black Tide. I want to thank you all for your support throughout the years. It has been an amazing journey. I will still continue to write all types of music including Heavy Fucking Metal. I still love Light From Above and Post Mortem. I am a musician and I put my heart into everything that I create. It doesn't end here for me and I hope most of you will come along with me for the ride. Right now i'm working on my solo Suspense ep where I write/produce/engineer and perform electronic dance music with a twist of my live drums. I will be touring soon and if I don't know you, I want to meet you! I will be happy to answer any questions that you guys might have for me. Peace and Love."

On July 3, 2013, it was confirmed via Facebook that Tim D'Onofrio would be the new drummer of the band and that they were currently recording a new EP named Bite the Bullet. The band stated the EP would consist of six songs and would be released sometime in the summer. The vacancy of the bassist Zakk Sandler was filled by Gabriel Garcia himself. On August 5, Gabriel wrote on Facebook that "We really went back to our roots on this one & it is being mixed right now!" The EP was released November 12, 2013.

On August 24, Black Tide announced that their first single off their upcoming EP would be titled "Not Afraid" and would be released on August 31.

On November 12, 2013, the band officially released the Bite the Bullet EP via iTunes. The band went on to support the EP touring the East Coast from November 26 through December 9. A close friend to Gabriel, Ronny Gutierrez, filled in on bass duties during the tour.

Tim D'Onofrio announced via Facebook that he had left Black Tide on good terms.

=== Lineup changes, Chasing Shadows, and breakup (2014–2016) ===
On March 16, 2014, it was confirmed via Facebook that Ronny Gutierrez would permanently be the band's bassist and Cody Paige would be the new official drummer. Paige was discovered by Ronny Gutierrez; he was covering Black Tide songs on YouTube. Upon discovering Paige was a Florida native, he was immediately contacted to audition to be the band's new drummer.

Starting on May 23, 2014, Black Tide departed on their Rise Again Tour in support of the Bite the Bullet EP, with support from Threat Signal, Affiance, and Hatchet. Gabriel Garcia stated about the upcoming headlining tour: "I can't wait to hit the road and bust this tour out. I've been driving around Miami blasting Hatchet all week. These guys are killer. We want to invite them to share our tour bus, but shit could get crazy. This is a kick ass bill, four high-energy live acts and the fans are gonna be blown away. A good time will be had by all. I may even announce our new record label on the last night of the tour."

In December 2014, it was reported Ronny Gutierrez was now playing guitar full-time with Shaggy and would not be able to continue on bass duties due to Shaggy's extensive touring schedule.

As of January 2015, Gabriel Garcia, Austin Diaz, and Cody Paige were recording a full-length album composed of all new material. On February 25, the band issued an update that drum work had been completed and guitars were being laid down. The sound of the new album is said to appease fans of both the first and second album, boasting rich solos, melodies, and heavy riffs. On May 22, the band announced through Facebook that the new album would be titled Chasing Shadows, which was released October 16, 2015 via Pavement Entertainment.

On July 22, 2016, Gabriel Garcia announced in his Instagram that the band is over and he is concentrating on his solo project.

=== Band reunion and new music (2026–present) ===
On January 1, 2026, the band posted a teaser including archival footage, confirming that the band had reunited, along with teasing a cover of Thin Lizzy's "The Boys Are Back In Town". On January 9, the cover released on all streaming platforms, along with confirmation that new original music was coming, 'along with some old-school Black Tide projects'. Later, on January 24, a music video for the cover was released, along with a confirmation that Gabriel has been in talks with original members of the band, to 'build this thing back up together & see where we can take it'

== Musical style and influences ==
Their music has changed throughout each release. For their first album, Light from Above, the band incorporated sounds of classic heavy metal bands. For their second release, Post Mortem, they changed their sound to metalcore. On their latest release, Just Another Drug EP, they have a more hard rock sound with a mix of some metalcore. In an interview, Gabriel Garcia has stated "We don't like to limit ourselves; If I did have to say something, I'd just say we're a rock band.

The band's influences include Megadeth, Metallica, Iron Maiden, Pantera, Ozzy Osbourne, Judas Priest, Guns N' Roses, Mötley Crüe, Jimi Hendrix, Testament, Bullet for My Valentine, Trivium, Children of Bodom, Death, Van Halen, Kreator, Black Label Society, Avenged Sevenfold, Yngwie Malmsteen, Racer X, Incubus, Lamb of God, and The Beatles.

They have also covered Iron Maiden and Metallica with the songs "Prowler" and "Hit the Lights". In an interview, Gabriel Garcia has said "I listen to everything from Justin Timberlake to U2 to Incubus to Pantera. I listen to a lot of hip hop — I just love music in general. I would say Guns N' Roses is one of my favorite bands." It was confirmed in an interview that Gabriel Garcia's favorite band is Megadeth, Zakk Sandler's is Iron Maiden, and Steven Spence's is Pantera.

== In other media ==
- The band's singles "Shockwave" and "Warriors of Time" were made available as downloadable content in the rhythm-based video game Rock Band; "Show Me the Way" was added later to Rock Band's downloadable content. "Shockwave" is also featured on the video game Skate 2 for Xbox 360 and PlayStation 3.
- "Show Me the Way" is in MotorStorm: Pacific Rift, an all vehicle racing game for the PlayStation 3, and has also appeared on Rock Band Unplugged as a master track for PlayStation Portable.
- "Warriors of Time" is also featured as the title theme in NHL 09 and is occasionally played during ice hockey matches in the NHL.
- "Shout" is featured on the soundtrack for the racing game Colin McRae: Dirt 2 and NFL Tour.
- "Warriors of Time", "Shockwave", "Light from Above", "Black Abyss" and "Shout" are featured as downloadable content for the iPod Touch and iPhone music game Tap Tap Revenge 2.
- "Shockwave" is featured as the final song in Guitar Hero: Modern Hits.
- "Shockwave" is featured on the soundtrack for the 2008 racing game SCORE International Baja 1000
- "Honest Eyes" was featured in Street Fighter X Tekken, not only in multiple promotional trailers for the game, but also in the game itself as the background song for the introduction.
- "That Fire" is featured as a level-up bonus in Tap Tap Revenge 4, and is featured on NHL 12, as well as a playable song in the GHTV section of Guitar Hero Live.

== Band members ==
Current

- Gabriel Garcia – lead guitar, lead vocals (2004–2016, 2026–present), bass (2004, 2013–2014, 2014–2016, 2026–present), rhythm guitar (2004, 2026–present)
- Raul Garcia – drums (2004–2006, 2026–present)

Former

- Alex Nuñez – rhythm guitar, backing vocals (2004–2008)
- Zakk Sandler – bass, backing vocals (2004–2013)
- Steven Spence – drums (2006–2013)
- Austin Diaz – rhythm guitar, backing vocals (2008–2016)
- Tim D'Onofrio – drums (2013–2014)
- Clyde Clark – bass , backing vocals (2016)
- Ronny Gutierrez – bass (2014)
- Cody Paige – drums (2014–2016)

Timeline

== Discography ==
Studio albums

- Light from Above (2008)
- Post Mortem (2011)
- Chasing Shadows (2015)
