= ZOG =

Zog or ZOG may refer to:

== People ==
- King Zog I of Albania (1895–1961), ruled 1928 to 1939
- Zog Djaloshi (born 2000), Albanian footballer
- The Zog, a nickname of American comedian Seth Herzog

== Fiction ==
- Zog (children's book) by Julia Donaldson

=== Fictional entities ===
- Zog, the home planet of the puppet characters Zig and Zag
- Zog, Triceraton soldier in the Teenage Mutant Ninja Turtles universe
- Zog, robot character in the film Astro Boy (2009)
- King Zøg, father of the protagonist Bean in the animated series Disenchantment
- Zog, semi-humanoid sea-monster and evil magician in L. Frank Baum's fantasy novel The Sea Fairies (published 1911)
- Zog, an alien in a Doctor Who stage play

== Other ==
- Zionist Occupation Government conspiracy theory, an antisemitic trope
- ZOG (hypertext), an early hypertext system developed at Carnegie Mellon University during the 1970s
- Zillions of Games, a commercial general game playing system developed by Jeff Mallett and Mark Lefler in 1998

== See also ==
- Zog BogBean – From the Marcy Playground, John Wozniak album
- Zog-zog monkey, also known as Prince Bernhard's titi monkey
- Zod (disambiguation)
