= Everybody (Stabilo song) =

Song by Stabilo

Single by Stabilo

from the album Cupid?
- Released: Mid 2001 and May 2004
- Genre: Rock
- Length: 3:58 (Stabilo Boss); 3:35 (Cupid? and Happiness and Disaster)
- Label: Independent; EMI Canada
- Songwriters: Jesse Dryfhout, Christopher John
- Producers: Matthew J Doughty / Chris Davies (Stabilo Boss); Jon Anderson, John Wozniak, Stabilo (Cupid?)

Stabilo singles chronology
"Everybody"	"One More Pill"

"Everybody" is a song by Canadian rock band Stabilo. Originally released from Stabilo Boss, and was again released on Cupid?. Both times it was a single, though much of the production of later versions seem to echo the direction of its 2000 Producer, Matthew J Doughty (sometimes credited as Matt Doughty).

Air time for Everybody, and Stabilo, started when a DJ at the Vancouver's XFM decided to play "Everybody" on their music competition show, Chaos. The song dominated the station's Top 7@7 charts for nearly a month. In 2004, the song was rerecorded during the Cupid? sessions at the historic Mushroom studios, with John Wozniak of Marcy Playground.

It was also re-released as a bonus track on their 2006 album Happiness and Disaster.

== Chart positions ==
Chart (2004)	Peak position
Canada Hot AC Top 30 (Radio & Records)	9
Canada Rock Top 30 (Radio & Records)	18
