= Leaving Wonderland... in a Fit of Rage =

Studio album by Marcy Playground
- Released: July 7, 2009
- Studio: Mushroom (Vancouver)
- Genre: Alternative rock
- Length: 37:16
- Label: WOZ
- Producer: Jeff Dawson; John Wozniak

Marcy Playground chronology
| MP3 (2004) | Leaving Wonderland... in a Fit of Rage (2009) | Indaba Remixes from Wonderland (2010) |

Leaving Wonderland... in a Fit of Rage is the fourth studio album by American alternative rock band Marcy Playground, released on July 7, 2009 by WOZ Records. It was begun as a John Wozniak solo album. The album's first single was "Blackbird".

A remix album, Indaba Remixes from Wonderland, followed in 2010.

== Production ==
The album was produced by Jeff Dawson and John Wozniak; Wozniak had appreciated Dawson's production work at Mushroom Studios. Its lyrics were inspired by a difficult period in the singer's life. Leaving Wonderland... in a Fit of Rage was recorded in part with original band member Dylan Keefe. The band added drummer Shlomi Lavie after the album was completed.

== Critical reception ==
Professional ratings
Review scores
| Source | Rating |
|---|---|
| AllMusic | 3/5 stars |
| Toronto Sun | 3/5 stars |

Exclaim! called the album "a tribute to the opiate-inspired, alt-rock tradition [the band] once popularized." The Star Tribune deemed it "a slightly rootsier update of the group's quirky style." The Star-News labeled it "sonically diverse and intensely personal."

The Pittsburgh Tribune-Review determined that "the music still has a dark aspect and it's still pop; it's just radio that has stopped paying attention." The Toronto Sun considered the album to be "a fairly enjoyable and varied set of mellow Beatle-pop and roots, peppered with surprisingly crunchy guitar-rockers." The Intelligencer Journal concluded that "all 12 songs on Leaving Wonderland ... are excellent, driven by Wozniak's gift for melody."

AllMusic wrote that "it deserves to be heard by a wider audience as it proves that there's more to Marcy Playground and Wozniak than one grunge-era hit."

== Track listing ==
All songs written by John Wozniak.

| No. | Title | Length |
|---|---|---|
| 1. | "Blackbird" | 3:13 |
| 2. | "Devil Woman" | 3:04 |
| 3. | "Gin and Money" | 3:44 |
| 4. | "Star Baby" | 2:49 |
| 5. | "I Burned the Bed" | 2:37 |
| 6. | "Irene" | 2:42 |
| 7. | "Emperor" | 3:39 |
| 8. | "Good Times" | 3:15 |
| 9. | "I Must Have Been Dreaming" | 2:34 |
| 10. | "Memphis" | 2:48 |
| 11. | "Thank You" | 3:33 |
| 12. | "Down the Drain" | 3:18 |

== Personnel ==
Marcy Playground

- John Wozniak – vocals, guitar, banjo, Dobro
- Dylan Keefe – bass
- Shlomi Lavie – drums (does not play on album)

Additional personnel

- Niko Friesen - drums, percussion
- Brendan Ostrander - drums, "Devil Woman" and "Thank You"
- Chris Copeland - drums, "Gin and Money"
- Simon Kendall - piano, Fender Rhodes, Wurlitzer
- Daniel Powter - piano, "Gin and Money"
- Jon Dryden - string programming, "Down the Drain"
- Jeff Dawson - keys, programming, guitar, "Thank You"
- Dave Pickell - piano, "Blackbird"
- Marc Wild - guitar, "Blackbird"

== Production ==
- John Wozniak - production
- Jeff Dawson - production, recording, mixing
- Bob Ludwig - mastering

Recorded at Mushroom Studios, Vancouver, BC
Mixed at Harbourside Studios, N. Vancouver, BC
Mastered at Gateway Mastering, Portland, Maine
