= Stabilo =

Stabilo may refer to:

- Schwan-Stabilo, a global maker of writing, highlighting and coloring pens
- Stabilo (band), a Canadian musical group
- Stabilo Boss (album), the self-titled album by Stabilo Boss (now Stabilo)
- Stabilo (rocket), of ARCASPACE industries
