= Lunch, Recess & Detention =

Studio album / Compilation album by Marcy Playground
- Released: June 26, 2012
- Genre: Alternative rock, post-grunge
- Label: Capitol

Marcy Playground chronology
Indaba Remixes from Wonderland (2010)	Lunch, Recess & Detention (2012)

Singles from Lunch, Recess & Detention
- 1. "Mr. Fisher" Released: 2012

Lunch, Recess & Detention is the sixth major release by the band Marcy Playground. It was released for digital download on June 26, 2012, the physical CD was also released in Canada on this date. Physical release of the CD in the United States was July 17, 2012.

The first single from the album was "Mr. Fisher".

== Track listing ==
No.	Title	Length
1.	"Shapeshifter"	3:40
2.	"Black Eyed Sue"	3:03
3.	"Whiter Shade Of Pale" (Procol Harum Cover)	4:16
4.	"Brand New Day (Feat. Jesse Dryfhout)"	3:36
5.	"Bang Bang Bang"	3:23
6.	"Comin' Up From Behind"	3:43
7.	"Hallelujah (Acoustic Version)" (Leonard Cohen Cover)	3:48
8.	"Mr. Fisher"	2:46
9.	"Sex And Candy"	2:52
10.	"Bye Bye"	2:50
11.	"Crazy Katy Nicotine And Her Red Jet Air Balloon"	1:59
12.	"Up And Down"	3:10
13.	"The Plant Song"	1:05
14.	"Special"	3:14
15.	"Rosey Risin'"	2:51
16.	"The Ballad Of Aslan"	3:38
17.	"The Needle And The Damage Done (Acoustic Version)" (Neil Young Cover)	2:10
18.	"The Angel Of The Forever Sleep"	4:51
19.	"Sex And Candy (Disco Superfly Remix)"	4:09

== Personnel ==
- John Wozniak - all vocals, guitar
- Dylan Keefe - bass
- Shlomi Lavie - drums
