= Koulouris =

Koulouris is a surname. Notable people with the surname include:

- Efthymis Koulouris (born 1996), Greek footballer
- Silver Koulouris (born 1947), Greek musician
- Dimitrios Koulouris, Greek swimmer
- Georgios Koulouris, Greek footballer

== See also ==
- Koulouri
- Koulouri (disambiguation)
