= Indaba Remixes from Wonderland =

Indaba remixes from Wonderland

Remix album by Marcy Playground
- Released: September 28, 2010
- Recorded: 2010
- Genre: Post-grunge
- Label: Capitol/EMI
- Producer: John Wozniak

Marcy Playground chronology
Leaving Wonderland...in a fit of rage (2009)	Indaba remixes from Wonderland (2010)	Lunch, Recess & Detention (2012)

Indaba remixes from Wonderland is the fifth release of the alternative rock band Marcy Playground. It was released on September 28, 2010. Fans and musicians from all around the world had submitted some 337 individual remixes to Indaba Music in support of the album. "Marcy Playground" were extremely impressed by the various musical directions and vast musical genres fans and fellow musicians went with the music.

== Track listing ==
All tracks are written by John Wozniak.

No.	Title	Length
1.	"Blackbird (Max Kourilov Remix)" (Remixed by Max Kourilov from AUSTRALIA)	689
2.	"Memphis (Thomas Leclercq)" (Remixed by Thomas Leclercq from FRANCE)
3.	"I Must Have Been Dreaming (Soundminister Remix)" (Remixed by Henning Michael Velten from SWEDEN)
4.	"Star Baby (Star Capella Baby Remix)" (Remixed by Johan Klein Nibbelink from NETHERLANDS)
5.	"Gin and Money (Ben Crea Remix)" (Remixed by Ben Crea from AUSTRALIA)
6.	"I Burned The Bed (Metal Monger Mix)" (Remixed by Joel Simon from UNITED STATES)
7.	"Blackbird (Assaf Spector Remix)" (Remixed by Assaf Spector from UNITED STATES)
8.	"Devil Woman (Orby Spectre Remix)" (Remixed by Orby Spectre from UNITED KINGDOM)
9.	"Emperor (Chinese Emperor Remix)" (Remixed by Mariko L.K. Langan from UNITED KINGDOM)
10.	"Good Times (Jus Bus Remix)" (Remixed by Justin "Jus Bus" from ANTIGUA)
11.	"Irene (Spoon Mix)" (Remixed by Joaquin Mino from ARGENTINA)
12.	"Thank You (James Merrifield Remix)" (Remixed by James Merrifield from UNITED KINGDOM)
13.	"Down The Drain (Morescode Remix)" (Remixed by Neil Morrissey from CANADA)

== Personnel ==
Marcy Playground

- John Wozniak - lead vocals, guitar, songwriter, producer
- Dylan Keefe - bass, backing vocals
- Shlomi Lavie - drums, backing vocals
