= Shapeshifter (Marcy Playground album) =

Studio album by Marcy Playground
- Released: November 2, 1999
- Studio: Sabella Studios, Roslyn Heights, New York; Mushroom Studios, Vancouver
- Genre: Alternative rock
- Length: 48:04
- Label: Capitol
- Producer: John Wozniak

Marcy Playground chronology
Marcy Playground (1997)	Shapeshifter (1999)	MP3 (2004)

Singles from Shapeshifter
- 1. "It's Saturday" Released: 1999; 2. "Bye Bye" Released: 1999

Shapeshifter is the second studio album by American alternative rock band Marcy Playground, released on November 2, 1999, by Capitol Records.

The album's first single was "It's Saturday", which peaked at No. 25 on the Billboard Modern Rock Tracks chart. The band promoted the album by touring with Blinker the Star.

== Production ==
Produced by frontman John Wozniak, Shapeshifter was recorded at Sabella Studios in Roslyn Heights, New York, and mixed at Mushroom Studios in Vancouver; Wozniak ended up buying and renovating the latter venue. The majority of the songs had been in the band's live set for years.

The album cover artwork is by Mark Ryden. It was originally commissioned for the Butthole Surfers, from an idea by their guitarist Paul Leary; Marcy Playground were unaware of its origins when they chose it for Shapeshifter.

== Critical reception ==
Professional ratings
Review scores
Source	Rating
AllMusic	3/5 stars
Edmonton Journal	3.5/4 stars
Entertainment Weekly	B+
Los Angeles Times	3/4 stars
Rolling Stone	2.5/5 stars
The Sydney Morning Herald	4/5 stars

Entertainment Weekly thought that "Wozniak’s winsome lyrics set the trio above other alterna-pop hopefuls." Rolling Stone determined that "rather than build on the promise of Marcy Playground's amateurish fun, the boys cling too tightly to watered-down grunge riffs." The Los Angeles Times concluded that "the guitars are a little louder and the melodies more forceful, but Wozniak's sense of wonder is intact, which makes Shapeshifter a loopy pleasure." The Sydney Morning Herald noted that "'Rebel Sodville' includes one of the longest sustained high notes this side of Jeff Buckley."

The Boston Globe stated that Wozniak "writes inviting melodies that slide smoothly between folk-rock and electric hard-rock peaks." The Age wrote that "Shapeshifter actually rocks out from time to time, with the Gothic ballad 'All the Lights Went Out' crashing out in true arena epic style." The Edmonton Journal deemed the album "doleful, dotty rock," writing that it is "nowhere near as lethargic as Marcy's first disc."

AllMusic wrote that "this faceless alternapop trio tosses together more harmless songs that don't have much to say yet manages to lumber along anyway."

== Track listing ==
All tracks are written by John Wozniak.

No.	Title	Length
1.	"It's Saturday"	3:17
2.	"America"	3:46
3.	"Bye Bye"	2:49
4.	"All the Lights Went Out"	4:55
5.	"Secret Squirrel"	2:56
6.	"Wave Motion Gun"	3:44
7.	"Rebel Sodville"	5:02
8.	"Sunday Mail"	2:49
9.	"Pigeon Farm"	2:31
10.	"Never"	3:50
11.	"Love Bug"	4:12
12.	"Our Generation" (includes hidden track "Ol' Time Pigeon Farm")	8:13

== Personnel ==
- John Wozniak – guitar, vocals
- Dylan Keefe – bass and backing vocals
- Dan Rieser – drums and backing vocals
