= Pontic eagle =

Ethnic symbol of the Pontic Greeks

The Pontic eagle is the primary ethnic symbol of the Pontic Greeks, also called Pontian Greeks. The bird has spread wings and looks to the side. The eagle appears on proposed Pontic Greek ethnic flags, and many Pontic organizations use it as part of their logo.

== History and evolution of the symbol ==
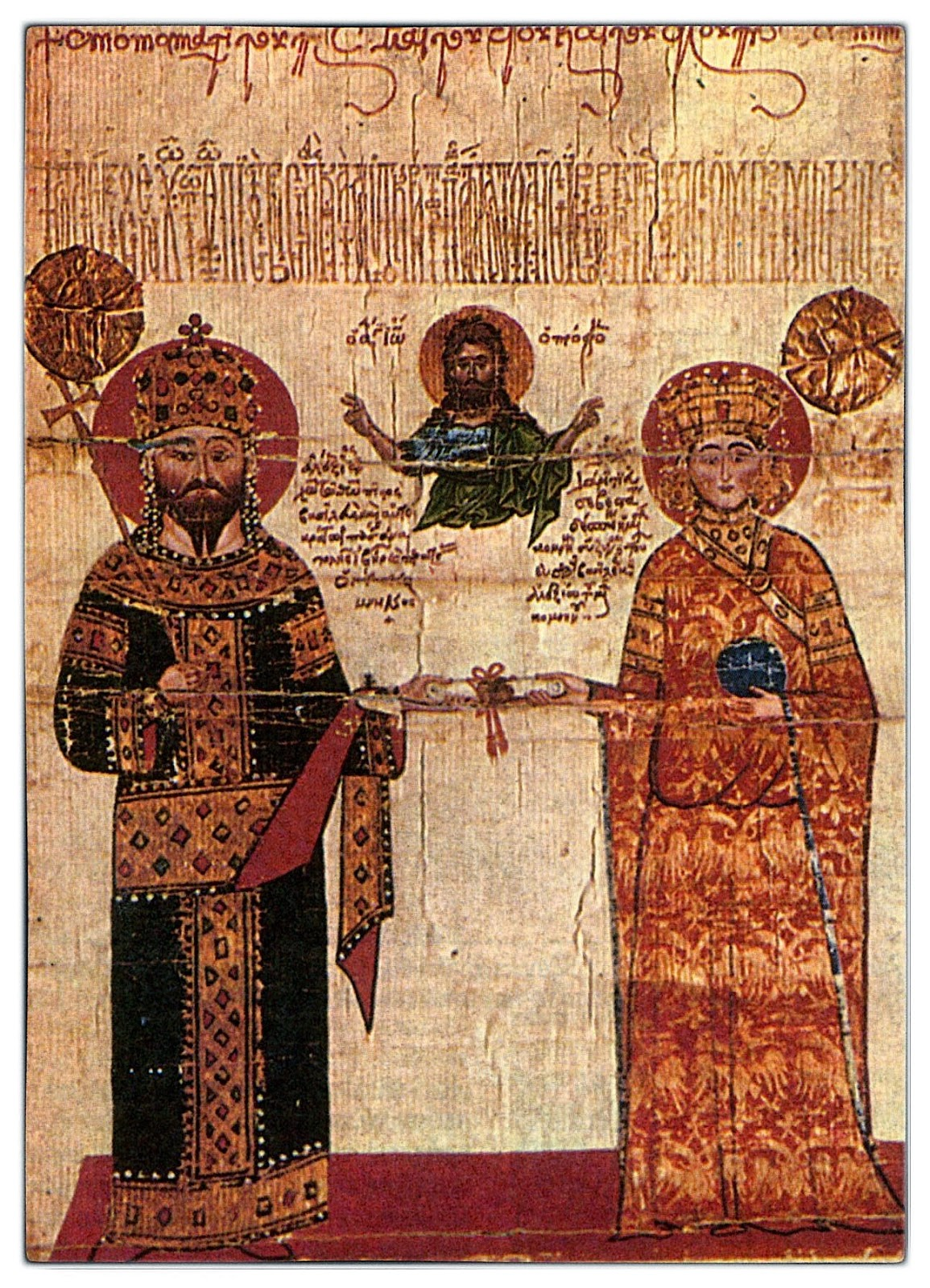
Empress of Trebizond Theodora Kantakouzene (right) with double-headed eagles on her robes

An eagle with spread wings, looking over its left shoulder, has been a symbol in the Pontus since at least 200 BCE. Pontic historian Sam Topalidis posits that the double-headed eagle emerged as a symbol in ancient Mesopotamia and came to ancient Anatolia with Assyrian merchants. It was later used as by the Hittites, Armenians, and Persians. Hittites also used the single-headed eagle in their iconography.

Coins depicting eagles found in Olbia, an ancient Greek colony in what is now Ukraine, have been dated to c. 350-330 BCE. Greek burial mounds on the Taman Peninsula in modern Russia also contain depictions of eagles. These date to the 400s BCE.

Coins minted in Sinope, one of the earliest Pontic Greek settlements, depict eagles as early as 330 BCE. The eagle with its head turned and wings spread appears on the coins of Sinope between 300 and 200 BCE. The eagle was also an ancient Roman symbol (aquila) and, later, a Byzantine symbol. The double-headed eagle appears in Byzantine art in the 900s or 1000s. In the 1800s, Scottish historian George Finlay saw a portrait of Manuel I Komnenos in the Hagia Sophia, Trabzon; Finlay said "his robes are adorned...with two rows of single-headed eagles on circular medallions." The portrait is now lost. Finlay also saw the St. Gregory of Nyssa Church in Trebizond, now destroyed, and took note of the art on the walls. Paintings in the church depicted an emperor and empress; the empress' robes had double-headed eagles, while the emperor's robes had single-headed eagles.

The eagle was later used as an imperial symbol in the Empire of Trebizond, a medieval kingdom of the Pontos region. Single-headed eagles appeared in city architecture in Trebizond in the 1200s. Emperors and empresses of the Empire of Trebizond were depicted with single- or double-headed eagles on their clothes. For example, Theodora Kantakouzene, the empress during the reign of Alexios III, was depicted with double-headed eagles on her robes.

== Modern usage ==
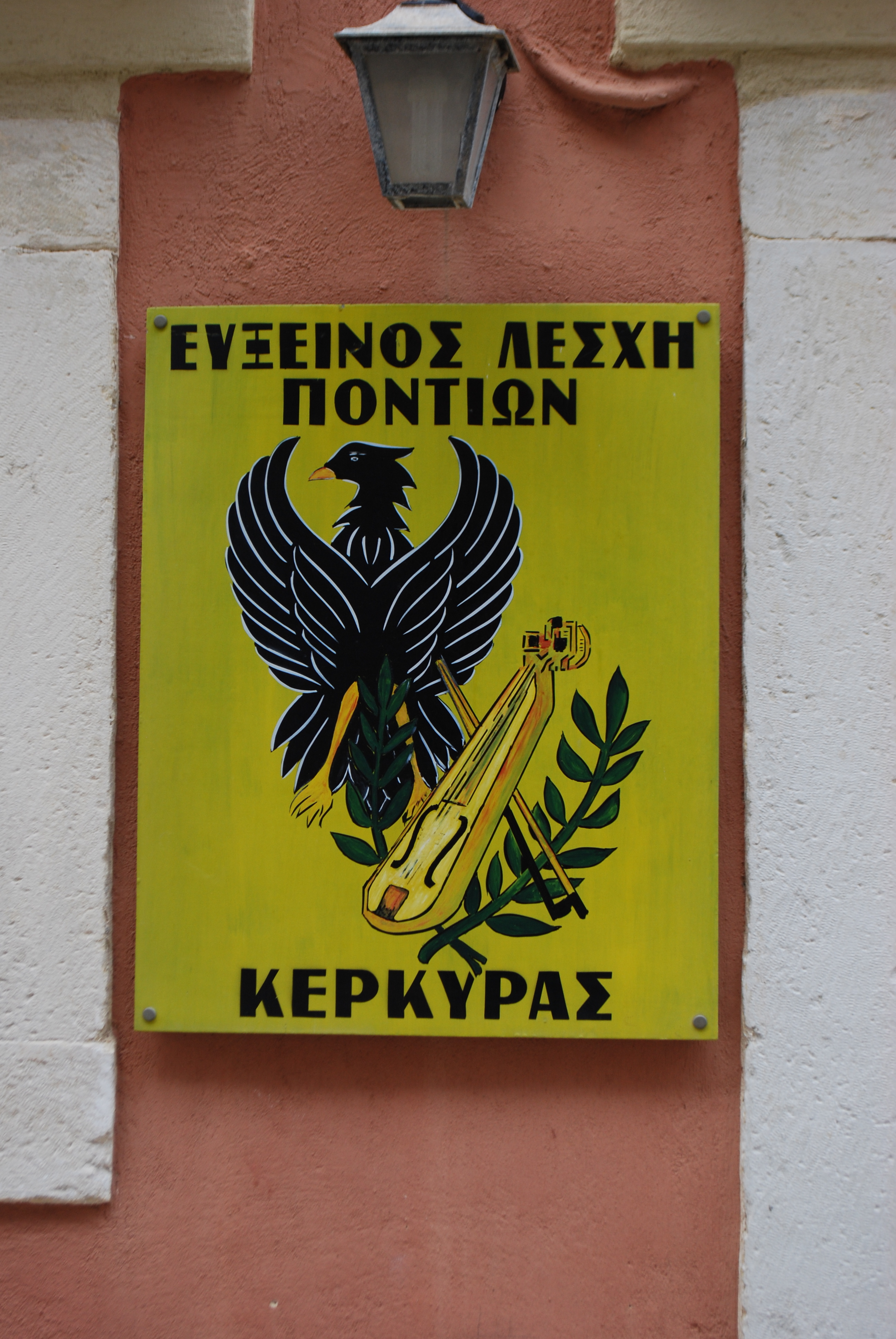
Pontic eagle and lyra painted on the sign of the Euxeinos Leschi Pontion (Pontian Club of Corfu)

Today, the Pontic eagle is used as a symbol by Pontic groups and publications. For example, the Committee For Pontian Studies, which produces the Greek-language journal Archeion Pontou, has used the Pontic eagle as a symbol since the 1920s. The journal Pontiaki Estia also used the eagle as their icon in the 1950s.

The Pontic eagle may also be a symbol during religious events. On the Feast of the Dormition, Pontian Greeks in northern Greece hold a procession, carrying the icon of the Virgin Mary. The icon stand is decorated with images of peacocks, crosses, and the Pontic eagle. During a 2021 ceremony to commemorate the Greek genocide, Archbishop Elpidophoros of America used a banner depicting the Pontic eagle.

Multiple organizations use the Pontic eagle as part of their logo: The Pontian Federation of Australia has a gold Pontic eagle, layered on top of a drawing of Australia, as its icon. The Australian group Pontiaki Estia also has an eagle logo.

=== On flags ===
One of the Pontic flags

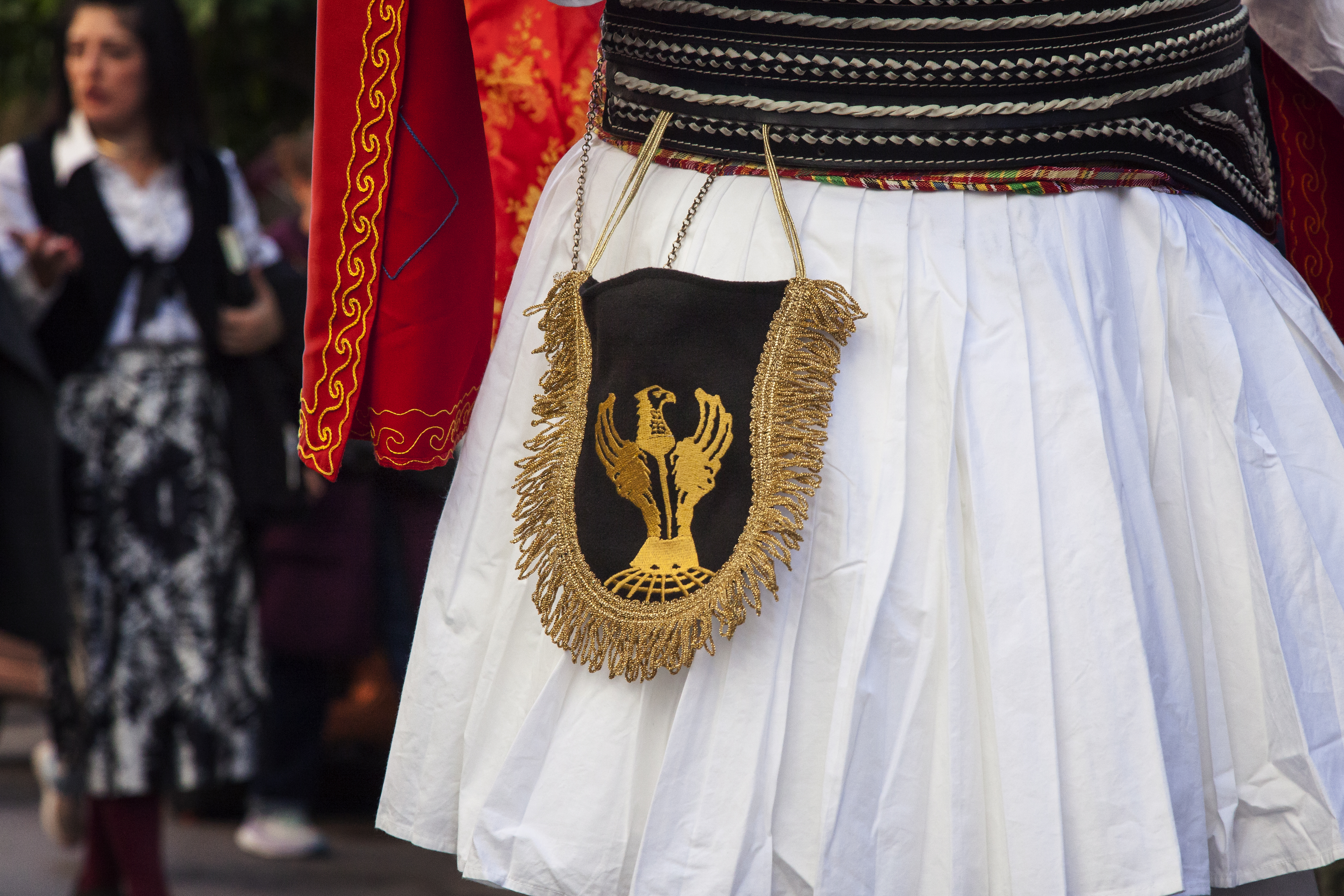
Man in Greece wearing a bag embroidered with the Pontic eagle over fustanella, 2023

There are many proposed Pontian flags; none has been universally adopted as the official flag. A yellow flag with a black Pontic eagle is common across many organizations. Different Pontian organizations use different flags and banners. The Komninoi Pontian Society, based in Queens in New York City in the US, uses a yellow flag with a black Pontic eagle. So does the Vityazevo Greek Society in Russia. The Pontian Brotherhood of South Australia, based in Adelaide, also uses a yellow flag with a black Pontic eagle. Their banner has the same design. The Argonauti-Komninoi Pontic Greek Association, based in Athens, uses a yellow flag with black lineart depicting an eagle and the Argonaut.

=== In sporting clubs ===
The Apollon Kalamarias, a men's football club based in Kalamaria, Greece, was founded by Pontian refugees in 1926. A black and yellow Pontic eagle makes up part of their logo. The club was founded with the intention to uphold Pontic history and tradition; however, the club is not exclusive to Pontians.

The Pontian Eagles Soccer Club is a member of the South Australian Amateur Soccer League. It was founded in 1992 by the Pontian Brotherhood of South Australia, a community organization which aims to preserve Pontian history in the diaspora. The soccer club was intended to give Pontian youth a space to belong; like Apollon Pontus F.C., however, it accepts players of all ethnicities. The logo is a stylized eagle in yellow and black. The head is facing forward, unlike in the typical Pontic eagle design where the head is in profile.
