= Marcy Playground (album) =

Studio album by Marcy Playground
- Released: February 25, 1997
- Recorded: 1996–1997
- Studio: Sabella Recording (Roslyn, New York)
- Genres: Alternative rock; post-grunge
- Length: 34:37
- Label: Capitol
- Producer: John Wozniak

Marcy Playground chronology
Marcy Playground (1997)	Shapeshifter (1999)

Singles from Marcy Playground
- 1. "Poppies" Released: 1997; 2. "Saint Joe on the School Bus" Released: June 1997; 3. "Sex and Candy" Released: September 15, 1997; 4. "Sherry Fraser" Released: 1998

Marcy Playground is the debut studio album by American alternative rock band Marcy Playground, released on February 25, 1997, on EMI. It was reissued later that year on October 7 on Capitol Records with a large amount of promotion for the single "Sex and Candy," which became the band's breakthrough single, spending a then-record 15 weeks at No. 1 on the Billboard Modern Rock Tracks chart.

The album also includes the singles "Saint Joe on the School Bus" and "Sherry Fraser" both of which received moderate radio and MTV2 airplay.

== Critical reception ==
Professional ratings
Review scores
Source	Rating
AllMusic	3/5 stars
Christgau's Consumer Guide	(dud)
NME	7/10
Pitchfork	7.6/10
The Rolling Stone Album Guide	2.5/5 stars

Marcy Playground garnered a mixed reception from music critics. Ronan Munro of NME said that, "What is surprising is how enjoyable this window on Wozniak's soul is: his lazy drawl and gentle melodies coating his misery in a pop sheen... the mood remains resolutely downbeat but the angst is not imposing." James P. Wisdom of Pitchfork stated that Marcy Playground was "the most soothingly mellow and pleasant thing [he] had heard in a long time." AllMusic's Stephen Thomas Erlewine felt that "only a handful" of the album's tracks are as memorable as "Sex and Candy", while adding that "those moments are what make Marcy Playground a promising, albeit imperfect, debut."

Robert Christgau graded the album as a "dud", indicating "a bad record whose details rarely merit further thought." Chuck Eddy of Rolling Stone heavily panned the album for its subpar musicianship, saying that it "sets icky new standards for commercial-post-alternative callowness." Dan Weiss of LA Weekly deemed it the twelfth-worst album of the 1990s, opining that aside from the singles "Sex and Candy" and "Saint Joe on the School Bus," the album is "folksy, opiate-obsessed bullshit".

== Track listing ==
All tracks are written by John Wozniak, except "Ancient Walls of Flowers" written by Sherry Fraser and Wozniak.

No.	Title	Length
1.	"Poppies"	2:49
2.	"Sex and Candy"	2:53
3.	"Ancient Walls of Flowers"	3:16
4.	"Saint Joe on the School Bus"	3:20
5.	"A Cloak of Elvenkind"	2:59
6.	"Sherry Fraser"	2:50
7.	"Gone Crazy"	2:45
8.	"Opium"	3:07
9.	"One More Suicide"	2:39
10.	"Dog and His Master"	2:12
11.	"The Shadow of Seattle"	2:48
12.	"The Vampires of New York"	2:55

== Personnel ==
Credits adapted from liner notes.

Marcy Playground

- John Wozniak – guitar, vocals
- Dylan Keefe – bass ("Saint Joe on the School Bus", "A Cloak of Elvenkind", "Gone Crazy", "Dog and His Master", "The Shadow of Seattle")
- Dan Rieser – drums ("Saint Joe on the School Bus")

Additional musicians

- Glen Braver – bass ("Poppies")
- Jared Kotler – bass ("Sex and Candy", "Sherry Fraser", "One More Suicide" and "The Vampires of New York"), drums (all except "Saint Joe on the School Bus")
- Edgar Mills – bass ("Ancient Walls of Flowers" and "Opium")
- Jen Handler – cello ("One More Suicide")

Production

- John Wozniak – production
- Jim Sabella – engineering
- Ken Gioia – engineering, mixing
- Marcy Playground – mixing
- Greg Calbi – mastering

Additional personnel

- Henry Marquez – art direction
- Robert Laverdiere – package design
- James Wojcik – cover and color photo
- Chris Black – black-and-white photo

== Charts ==
=== Weekly charts ===
Chart (1997–98)	Peak position
Australian Albums (ARIA)	28
Austrian Albums (Ö3 Austria)	16
Canada Top Albums/CDs (RPM)	16
New Zealand Albums (RMNZ)	20
Scottish Albums (Official Charts)	91
UK Albums (Official Charts)	61
US Billboard 200	21

=== Year-end charts ===
Chart (1998)	Position
US Billboard 200	58

== Certifications ==
Region	Certification	Certified units/sales
Australia (ARIA)	Gold	35,000^{^}
Canada (Music Canada)	2× Platinum	200,000^{^}
United States (RIAA)	Platinum	1,000,000^{^}
^{^} Shipments figures based on certification alone.
