= Sherry Fraser =

Single by Marcy Playground

from the album Marcy Playground
- Released: 1998
- Recorded: 1996
- Studio: Sabella Recording (Roslyn, New York)
- Genre: Alternative rock
- Length: 2:50
- Label: Capitol
- Songwriter: John Wozniak
- Producers: Jared "Slim" Kotler; John Wozniak

Marcy Playground singles chronology
"Sex and Candy" (1997)	"Sherry Fraser" (1998)	"Wave Motion Gun" (1999)

"Sherry Fraser" is a song by alternative rock/post-grunge band Marcy Playground, released in 1998 as the fourth single from their eponymous debut album. Although not as successful as the band's hit "Sex and Candy" nor the minor hit "Saint Joe on the School Bus", the song did receive moderate radio and MTV2 airplay in 1998. The track is named for a friend of the band, who is credited on the band's debut album as S. Fraser, the co-writer of the track "Ancient Walls of Flowers".

Sherry Fraser, the namesake of the song, is the founder of the band Two Ton Boa.

== Track listing ==
1. "Sherry Fraser" - 2:50

== Personnel ==
Credits adapted from liner notes.

- John Wozniak – guitar, vocals
- Jared Kotler – bass, drums
