= It's Saturday =

Single by Marcy Playground

from the album Shapeshifter
- Released: 1999
- Recorded: 1999
- Genre: Post-grunge
- Length: 3:15
- Label: Capitol Records
- Songwriter: John Wozniak

Marcy Playground singles chronology
"Comin' Up from Behind" (1999)	"It's Saturday" (1999)	"Bye Bye" (1999)

"It's Saturday" is a song by American rock band Marcy Playground, released as the first single from the band's second studio album, Shapeshifter (1999). It was originally titled "Teenage Hypochondriac" but was changed before the release date of the album. Although nowhere near as successful as the band's earlier smash hit "Sex and Candy," "It's Saturday" managed to hit number 25 on the US Modern Rock Charts. The lyrics of the song share common themes with the poem "Sick" by Shel Silverstein.

== Track listing ==
1. "It's Saturday" – 3:15

== Chart positions ==
Chart (1999)	Peak position
U.S. Billboard Modern Rock Tracks	25

== Music video ==
The music video for the song features the band members underneath the covers of a gigantic bed and reappearing in the beds of other sleepers. One scene shows them crawling into the bed of Pope John Paul II. It was directed by Peter Christopherson.
