= Stabilo (band) =

Canadian musical group

- Origin: Maple Ridge, British Columbia, Canada
- Genres: Rock; Acoustic rock
- Years active: 1999–2011 (hiatus)
- Label: EMI Canada
- Members: Jesse Dryfhout (vocals, guitars, keys); Christopher John (vocals, guitars, keys); Nathan Wylie (drums); Karl Williaume (bass)
- Past members: Shaun Bennett (bass)

Stabilo (originally Stabilo Boss) was a Canadian rock band from Maple Ridge, British Columbia. They formed in 1999 and are best known for the songs "Everybody", "One More Pill", "Don't Look in Their Eyes", "Flawed Design", and "Kidding Ourselves".

== History ==
=== Formation ===
Members Jesse Dryfhout and Christopher John (then Chris Moerman) were high school classmates who played in a band called Molly along with Shaun Bennett and McKenzie Dougall. Molly released their only EP, Ghosts of Yesterday, in 1997. Originally, Dryfhout was the band's drummer but began working with John on songwriting and vocals after writing the song "Everybody".

Molly's final performance was at a barn in Maple Ridge and was also Stabilo Boss's first performance as a band. Stabilo Boss featured 3 members from Molly: John, Dryfhout, and Bennett. The band also included new member Nathan Wylie, a former classmate of John and Dryfhout.

In 1999, the band recorded Kitchen Sessions, an independent recording made in a kitchen. The band and their friends created and distributed the album CDs. Around this time, Stabilo Boss gained more local recognition, especially among their university classmates.

=== 2000–2002: Self-titled debut album ===
In the summer of 2000, the band recorded their self-titled debut with Recording Producer/Engineer Matthew J Doughty at Praiz Sound Studio in Northern California. This recording marked the first appearance of bassist Karl Williaume. Released independently in early 2001, the album quickly sold out of its first pressing as Stabilo Boss gained more popularity in the local Vancouver music scene.

About a year later, a DJ at Vancouver's XFM radio station decided to play "Everybody" on their music competition show, Chaos. "Everybody" proved to be more popular than songs from more well-established artists and remained in the station's Top 7@7 charts for nearly a month. Due to the increased exposure, the band sold 5000 copies of their album and reached the notice of major labels.

Around this time, the band released The Beautiful Madness EP which they sold only at their live shows. The EP was recorded live off of the soundboard and featured a grand piano on all 4 tracks. It quickly sold out.

=== 2003–2005: Name change and Cupid? ===
While considering contract offers from major labels, the band recorded a new album at Mushroom Studios in Vancouver, owned by John Wozniak (Marcy Playground). According to John, Wozniak liked the band so much that he "basically just gave us free time there". By 2003, the band had completed the album, produced by Wozniak and local musician/producer Jon Anderson (Radiogram/Jonathan Inc).

A few months later, they signed a deal with EMI Canada and shortened their name to Stabilo. In an interview, Dryfhout stated that the band's name came from the Stabilo Boss brand highlighter they used to write down possible band names.

In 2003, Stabilo was the only independent artist to be nominated for Best New Rock Group in the Canadian Radio Music Awards.

After completing a live tour of Canada, Stabilo released the album Cupid? on May 11, 2004. To the disappointment of some longtime fans, Cupid? did not include most of the new material recorded at Wozniak's Mushroom Studios. Of the 7 songs on the album, only 3 were previously unreleased. Singles included "Everybody" and "One More Pill", both of which had been previously released on Stabilo Boss (2001). "Everybody" charted on the Canadian Hot AC Top 30.

=== 2006–2008: Happiness and Disaster ===
Stabilo released their second album with EMI Canada on April 4, 2006, called Happiness and Disaster. The first single, "Flawed Design", was co-written with Kevin Kadish. It was played on radio stations across Canada (and in nearby U.S. areas such as Detroit), rising to Number 1 on the Canadian charts. The music video was aired on MuchMusic, MuchMoreMusic and Most Requested.

In April 2006, Stabilo was interviewed about their unusual choice to feature two lead singers. Dryfhout stated: "Some people really like what we do. They get tired of hearing the same voice over and over again, but some get confused and it throws them right off. If they don't have a guy standing front and centre, they don't know who to worship."

In July 2006, Stabilo released "Kidding Ourselves", their second single and video from the Happiness and Disaster album.

In September 2006, Stabilo was awarded the SOCAN (Society of Composers, Authors and Music Publishers of Canada) #1 song award for "Flawed Design", which topped the Canadian Music Networks' Hot Adult Contemporary Chart on May 16, 2006. In February 2007, Stabilo was nominated as the Juno Awards New Band of the Year but lost to Mobile. In November 2007, Stabilo was awarded a SOCAN award for "Flawed Design" as the pop song that achieved the greatest number of plays on Canadian radio for 2006.

=== 2009–present: Hiatus ===
In April 2011, the band announced that they were on "permanent hiatus".

In 2012, Marcy Playground released the album Lunch, Recess & Detention, which included the song "Brand New Day", featuring vocals by Jesse Dryfhout.

Bass player Karl Williaume now plays with Canadian reggae singer Caleb Hart as a member of The Royal Youths.

Christopher John has released several solo albums, starting with The Missing (2009). His most recent release was Resonant (2022).

== Discography ==
=== Albums and EPs ===
- Kitchen Sessions (1999)
- Stabilo Boss (2001)
- The Beautiful Madness EP (2002)
- Cupid? (2004)
- Happiness and Disaster (2006)

=== Singles ===
Year	Single	Peak chart positions		Album
Year	Single	CAN Hot AC	CAN Rock	Album
2001	"Everybody"	—	—	Stabilo Boss
2001	"One More Pill"	—	—	Stabilo Boss
2004	"Everybody" (re-release)	9	18	Cupid?
2006	"Flawed Design"	1	18	Happiness and Disaster
2006	"Kidding Ourselves"	21	—	Happiness and Disaster
2006	"Don't Look Into their Eyes"	—	—	Happiness and Disaster
2008	"Starting Fires"	—	—	Happiness and Disaster
"—" denotes releases that did not chart
