= Saint Joe on the School Bus =

Single by Marcy Playground

from the album Marcy Playground
- Released: June 1997
- Recorded: 1996
- Studio: Sabella Recording (Roslyn, New York)
- Genre: Post-grunge, alternative rock
- Length: 3:20
- Label: Capitol
- Songwriter: John Wozniak
- Producer: John Wozniak

Marcy Playground singles chronology
"Poppies" (1997)	"Saint Joe on the School Bus" (1997)	"Sex and Candy" (1997)

"Saint Joe on the School Bus" is a song by American rock band Marcy Playground. It was released as the second single from their self-titled 1997 debut album. Although far from being as successful as the band's later smash hit "Sex and Candy", "Saint Joe on the School Bus" managed to reach number 8 on the US Modern Rock Tracks and number 30 on the Mainstream Rock Tracks. In the album liner notes Wozniak, the band's front man, states "this song is about being picked on". A video was made for the song in which a schoolyard bully "cries wolf" and is eventually devoured by one.

== Track listing ==
1. "Saint Joe on the School Bus" – 3:20
2. "The Vampires of New York (Real Version)" – 2:55
3. "The Shadows of Seattle (Live in Amsterdam)" – 2:50

== Personnel ==
Credits adapted from liner notes.

- John Wozniak – guitar, vocals
- Dylan Keefe – bass
- Dan Rieser – drums

== Chart positions ==
Chart (1998)	Peak position
US Alternative Airplay (Billboard)	8
US Mainstream Rock (Billboard)	30
