= Going Back to Memphis: A Biker Band Tribute to Elvis =

Going Back To Memphis: A Biker Band Tribute To Elvis

Studio album by Gene Kelton
- Released: 2007
- Genre: Rockabilly
- Label: JamBone Records

Going Back To Memphis: A Biker Band Tribute To Elvis is the third album for "Mean" Gene Kelton and the Die Hards. It was released in 2007 by JamBone Records. It contains 13 songs that are licensed by Elvis Presley Enterprises in Los Angeles, California. All thirteen songs were recorded in a row, live and raw, just like at a motorcycle rally. Only the harmonica and background vocals were dubbed in. The CD was recorded, mixed, and mastered in one marathon session on the night of June 23, 2007, at Sun Studio in Memphis, Tennessee.

== Track listing ==
All tracks by Mean Gene Kelton.

1. "Jailhouse Rock"
2. "Polk Salad Annie"
3. "Heartbreak Hotel"
4. "Blue Suede Shoes"
5. "One Night With You"
6. "Big Boss Man"
7. "Steamroller Blues"
8. "Little Sister"
9. "Memphis"
10. "Hound Dog"
11. "Baby What You Want Me To Do"
12. "Promised Land"
13. "Going Back To Memphis"
