= Happiness & Disaster =

Studio album by Stabilo
- Released: April 4, 2006
- Recorded: Late 2005
- Genre: Indie rock
- Length: 55:33
- Label: EMI
- Producer: Brad Wood

Stabilo chronology
| Cupid? (2004) | Happiness & Disaster (2006) |

Happiness & Disaster is the first full-length album by Canadian indie rock band Stabilo. The album debuted at #6 on the digital album chart and #20 on the Soundscan Top 200.

The first single and video is "Flawed Design", which has been played live since at least May 2004. The second single and video is "Kidding Ourselves", which was released in July 2006. The song "Beautiful Madness" is a re-recording of the song that is found on The Beautiful Madness EP which was independently released in 2002 under their original name, Stabilo Boss. Also featured as a bonus track is a new version of their hit "Everybody" re-recorded during the Happiness & Disaster recording sessions in late 2005.

This album has been released with the Copy Control protection system in some regions.

== Track listing ==
1. "Don't Look in Their Eyes" – 4:12
2. "Habit" – 3:15
3. "Kidding Ourselves" – 4:25
4. "Don't Be So Cold" – 4:31
5. "Flawed Design" – 3:47
6. "Delivering Idiots" – 4:15
7. "Happiness & Disaster" – 3:37
8. "Coffee Spills" – 3:54
9. "Rain Awhile" – 5:01
10. "Ordinary" – 4:23
11. "Beautiful Madness" – 5:06
12. "If It Was Up To Me" – 5:09
13. "Everybody" – 3:35

Members: Jesse Dryfhout, Christopher John, Nathan Wylie, Karl Williaume
