= Cupid? =

Studio album by Stabilo
- Released: May 11, 2004
- Recorded: Mushroom Studios
- Genre: Rock
- Length: 27:39
- Label: EMI Canada
- Producers: Jon Anderson, John Wozniak, Stabilo

Stabilo chronology
The Beautiful Madness EP (2002)	Cupid? (2004)	Happiness & Disaster (2006)

Cupid? is the first album by Canadian rock band Stabilo with a major record label and their first with their new modified name (originally "Stabilo Boss"). It contains seven songs, including the hit "Everybody". The songs "Stone", "Any Other Girl" and "Enemy" were new songs recorded specifically for the album. "Paperboy", "Everybody", "One More Pill" and "?" were re-recordings of older material.

== Track listing ==
1. "Paperboy" – 3:26
2. "Everybody" – 3:35
3. "Stone" – 3:53
4. "Any Other Girl" – 4:44
5. "One More Pill" – 3:49
6. "?" – 4:27
7. "Enemy" – 3:42
