= Thomas Tsimpoukas =

Greek footballer

Personal information
- Date of birth: 13 February 1999 (age 27)
- Place of birth: Lofos, Pieria, Greece
- Height: 1.85 m (6 ft 1 in)
- Position: Centre-back

Team information
- Current team: Apollon Kalamarias
- Number: 5

Youth career
- 2014–2018: Olympiacos

Senior career*
Years	Team	Apps	(Gls)
2018–2019	Achilleas Neokaisareia		
2019–2020	Kerkyra	6	(0)
2020–2022	Niki Volos	34	(2)
2022–2023	Almopos Aridea	24	(1)
2023–2024	Kozani	19	(0)
2024–	Apollon Kalamarias	0	(0)

International career
2015	Greece U16	3	(0)
2015–2016	Greece U17	10	(0)
- * Club domestic league appearances and goals as of 22 May 2024

Thomas Tsimpoukas (Greek: Θωμάς Τσιμπούκας; born 13 February 1999) is a Greek professional footballer who plays as a centre-back for Super League 2 club Apollon Kalamarias.
