= Mean Guitar =

Studio album by Gene Kelton
- Released: 2003
- Genre: Rockabilly
- Label: JamBone Records

Mean Guitar is the second album for "Mean" Gene Kelton and the Die Hards. It was released in 2003 by JamBone Records. It contains 15 songs that are "hotter than a welder's arc, fusing together Chuck Berry/Johnny Winter/Albert Collins and Delta Blues influences into one molten melting pot of scorching blues rock and smoldering Percy Sledge-style ballads."

== Track listing ==
All Tracks by Mean Gene Kelton

1. "Mean Guitar"
2. "Even Meaner"
3. "Give Blues A Chance"
4. "Ghost In My House"
5. "Two Thangs"
6. "Sweet Mother Blues"
7. "Guess Who"
8. "If Everybody Loved The Blues"
9. "Why Do You Punish Me"
10. "I Love My Job"
11. "Prince Of The Blues"
12. "So Wrong... So Right"
13. "These Blues Are Kickin' My Ass"
14. "Runnin' From The Law (Instrumental)"
15. "Party On The Levee"
