= Sex and Candy =

1997 single by Marcy Playground

Single by Marcy Playground

from the album Marcy Playground
- B-side: "The Angel of Forever Sleep"; "Memphis"
- Released: September 15, 1997
- Studio: Sabella Recording (Roslyn, New York)
- Genre: Post-grunge
- Length: 2:52
- Label: Capitol
- Songwriter: John Wozniak
- Producer: John Wozniak

Marcy Playground singles chronology
"Saint Joe on the School Bus" (1997)	"Sex and Candy" (1997)	"Sherry Fraser" (1998)

Music video
- "Sex and Candy" on YouTube

"Sex and Candy" is a song by American alternative rock group Marcy Playground, a single from their 1997 self-titled debut album. It is a post-grunge song with psychedelic elements. Lead singer John Wozniak was inspired to write the song after a woman told him that a room smelled like "sex and candy". The song's abstract lyrics refer to the disco era and include hippie lingo. In 1997, Wozniak said that "Sex and Candy" is an unorthodox love song; later, he said he does not know what the song means. It was released to radio on the week of September 15, 1997.

Music critics mostly praised the song. Some found it sensual; many compared it to the music of Nirvana. Some critics interpreted the track as a love song, and others thought its lyrics were nonsensical. Commercially, "Sex and Candy" peaked at number 2 on the Canadian RPM 100 Hit Tracks chart, number 8 on the US Billboard Hot 100 and number 1 on the Billboard Modern Rock Tracks chart, staying there for a then-record-setting 15 weeks. Worldwide, the single reached the top 20 in Australia, Iceland and Norway; it is the band's only hit song. A music video was directed and conceptualized by Jamie Caliri, depicting Wozniak's head protruding from a hole inside of a mountain and a crawling spider; it has been interpreted in Freudian terms and compared to the work of Salvador Dalí. "Sex and Candy" remains popular on rock radio and has been covered by Maroon 5 and Slothrust.

== Background ==
"Sex and Candy" stemmed from a moment in the late 1980s when John Wozniak, who had not yet started Marcy Playground, was in his girlfriend's dormitory at Bryn Mawr College, where his father taught. While he and his girlfriend were having sex in her dorm room, another young woman walked in following coitus interruptus. She said the room smelled like "sex and candy," a phrase that struck Wozniak as "weird and cool." Several years later, either in 1992 or 1993, Wozniak wrote the song in less than an hour in his bedroom at 4 a.m. In the song, he decided to combine the phrase "sex and candy" with "all these weird disco-era references that I was making up, 'platform double suede' and all that business". He also cited early grunge as an influence. According to MTV News, writing "Sex and Candy" was Wozniak's "first stab at coolness" following a childhood where he was isolated and often bullied. Wozniak also said that "If you listen to that song, it's pretty clear it wasn't written to be a hit. It's just a quirky little weird song."

Wozniak's explanations of the song's meaning have changed. In a 1997 interview in Billboard, he said it was a love song. While he enjoyed "classic" love songs by Cole Porter and The Beatles, he found most love songs that were on the radio during the 1980s formulaic and boring. Wozniak described "Sex and Candy" as his attempt to compose a love song which "didn't follow the typical formula, especially with the lyrics." When asked about the song's meaning in 2015, he said "It means so many different things, and so many different parts of it came from so many different places" before saying:

... it's just about seeing some sexy girl and then falling in love, and then asking a dumb question to yourself … well, it's not even asking a question ... I'm just gonna be straight up honest. I don't know....when I was writing these songs, I wasn't high. But it sounds like I was high.

== Composition ==
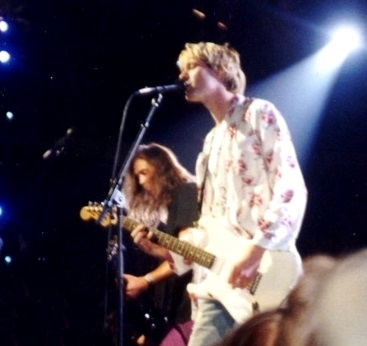
"Sex and Candy" was compared to the music of Nirvana (pictured).

"Sex and Candy" is a post-grunge song with elements of psychedelic music that lasts for two minutes and fifty-two seconds. It has a slow tempo, down-tempo chords, and "drawling" vocals from Wozniak. Its abstract lyrics reference "double cherry pie," "disco superfly," "disco lemonade" and "platform double-suede". The track's refrain is "I smell sex and candy." Jon Vena of MTV News described the track as "radio-friendly". Nathan Smith of the Houston Press stated "Sex and Candy" was perfect crossover music, as its edgy, sexual lyrics were suitable for rock radio, while it was still "pussy enough for adult contemporary."

Several media outlets compared "Sex and Candy" to the work of Nirvana, with Jonah Bayer of The A.V. Club specifically likening it to the sound of that band's 1994 album MTV Unplugged in New York. Dan Weiss of LA Weekly wrote "Sex and Candy" is the only song on Marcy Playground besides "Saint Joe on the School Bus" that resembles Nirvana's music. According to Gladstone of Cracked.com, many people mistakenly believe that "Sex and Candy" is a Nirvana song despite the fact that it was released after the 1994 suicide of Kurt Cobain; Gladstone opined "Only in the most superficial way is this song Nirvana-esque. It's moody and hooky." Other bands and sounds that critics heard in the song were the sort of music played at coffeehouses, Pearl Jam's session on MTV Unplugged, jam bands, The Beatles, and Beck.

Critics offered different interpretations of the song. Billboard's Bradley Bambarger and MTV News' Colin Devenish understood it as a love song while Rolling Stone's Chuck Eddy said that was about "a sad sack strung out on hippie lingo ('Dig it,' 'Yeah, mama') and caffeine." In his book Rock Song Index: The 7500 Most Important Songs for the Rock and Roll Era, Bruce Pollock said the song takes "the 'Good Morning, Little Schoolgirl' ethos a bit too far." John Barrett of Paste deemed it "a simple, dreamlike tale of first laying eyes on a beautiful woman." Bayer wrote that listeners tried hard to find meaning in the track's seemingly meaningless lyrics. He added that "nobody, including the songwriter, really knows what it's about." For Stereogum, Peter Helman called the song "nonsensical".

== Critical reception ==
According to Zachary Houle of PopMatters, "Sex and Candy" has a reputation for being the only good song in Marcy Playground's catalogue; Houle disputed the notion while praising the song. Bayer of The A. V. Club said that "There is something powerful in the simplicity and straight-forwardness of the song" and that its "chorus still sounds as captivating and strangely sensual as it did years ago." Stephen Thomas Erlewine of AllMusic commented that "songs like 'Sex and Candy' capture the band at their best, turning out hard-edged, melodic pop songs with strong hooks and backbeats." For MTV News, Jon Vena opined that the track "draws you in with sultry lyrics and a chillingly slow...tempo."

Barrett of Paste ranked it fifteenth on Paste's list of "25 Awesome One-Hit Wonders of the 1990s" while Consequence of Sound ranked it thirty-fourth on its list of "The 100 Best One-Hit Wonder Songs." Bruce Pollock included it as one of the entries in his book Rock Song Index: The 7500 Most Important Songs for the Rock and Roll Era. In Bustle, Rachel Semigran called the song "well-loved". Mike Wass of Idolator called the song "a post-grunge classic that is still played with alarming frequency on adult rock radio stations today." Mike Joyce of The Washington Post wrote "Some rock bands don't attract radio airplay so much as provoke it. Marcy Playground pulled off the trick...with 'Sex and Candy,' a titillating hit single that contained the sure-fire refrain, 'I smell sex and candy.'"

Chuck Eddy of Rolling Stone gave the song a less enthusiastic review, calling it "an unappetizing artificial-sweetener marriage of down-tempo Nirvana chords and greasy Dave Matthews frat-minstrel sensitivity". Nathan Smith of the Houston Press put it on a list of the publication's least favorite one-hit wonders, calling it "one of the most despicable hits of the '90s" because it "refuses to rock and it refuses to go away. I hated it the first time I heard it, and I hate it now. I will die hating it." Joe Robinson of Diffuser.fm found the song's references to sex and mothers Freudian and disturbing.

== Commercial performance ==
"Sex and Candy" was released to radio on the week of September 15, 1997. The Marcy Playground album drew little notice until a radio station in San Diego began playing "Sex and Candy" and at the same time the song was chosen by filmmaker Morgan J. Freeman for the soundtrack of his 1997 film Hurricane Streets. As the song became more popular, Wozniak was offered money for the publishing rights, offers that increased from $100,000 to $750,000. Wozniak decided that he would sell the rights to "Sex and Candy" if a buyer was willing to give him $1 million for the rights to the track and $750,000 for his next album. A week after the song reached the top position on Billboard's Modern Rock Tracks, he got three offers for those amounts and sold the rights. "Sex and Candy" spent a then-record 15 weeks at number one on Billboard's Modern Rock Tracks chart, and would finish as the number-one Modern Rock song of 1998. The track peaked at number 8 on the Billboard Hot 100 and number 2 on the Canadian 100 Hit Tracks chart. In the US, only 175,000 copies of the single were sent to retail outlets, selling 37,500 units during its first week on sale.

"Sex and Candy" was the band's only hit. The song became so successful that it had its own accountant. The head of radio promotion at Capitol Records, Marcy Playground's label, felt that the song's ubiquity hurt the band's career; Gil Kaufman of MTV News called the song a "career killer" and the band became known as a one-hit wonder. Wozniak said that, while he was pleased that the track "became a quintessential '90s moment," he was flabbergasted and overwhelmed by its success, adding that he would not want to produce another hit song of comparable popularity. Andrew Unterberger of Stylus Magazine wrote of its surprising success, calling it "easily one of the strangest top ten hits in history (Pavement sounds like Sister Hazel by comparison) and as much of a death knell for grunge as 'To Be with You' was for hair metal."

In 2023, for the 35th anniversary of the Modern Rock Tracks chart (which by then had been renamed to Alternative Airplay), Billboard ranked "Sex and Candy" as the 17th-most successful song in the chart's history.

== Music video ==
=== Background ===
The song's music video was directed and conceptualized by Jamie Caliri. Wozniak admired Caliri's surrealist artistic sensibility as well as the video he directed for Morphine's "Early to Bed". According to Wozniak, Caliri infused the video for "Sex and Candy" with various hidden meanings. The video for "Sex and Candy" took a week to film in October and was Marcy Playground's first video.

=== Synopsis ===
Wozniak as he appears in the music video

The video begins with a shot of synthetic hills with a checkerboard pattern on them. Wozniak's head appears, protruding from a hole inside one of the hills. A hook descends from the sky and lifts up a glass cage, releasing a spider who crawls toward Wozniak. Two men are shown in a room with a dresser. Wozniak is then seen in front of an arch; a shoe attached to a string lowers from the arch and men try to grab it. The same men pull strings out of a wall. The video ends with Wozniak lying in a blue puddle.

=== Reception ===
Wozniak's father, a developmental psychologist, analyzed the video in Freudian terms, seeing it as a representation of a wet dream. He believed that the hole Wozniak's head was in represented the womb, the spider Wozniak's loss of innocence (which he is both afraid of and drawn to), and the puddle at the end of the video to be a symbol for semen. Chad Childers of Loudwire deemed the video reminiscent of the art of Salvador Dalí and called it one of the "most romantic rock music videos". He saw it as depicting a romance between Wozniak and the spider.

== Cover versions and usage in media ==
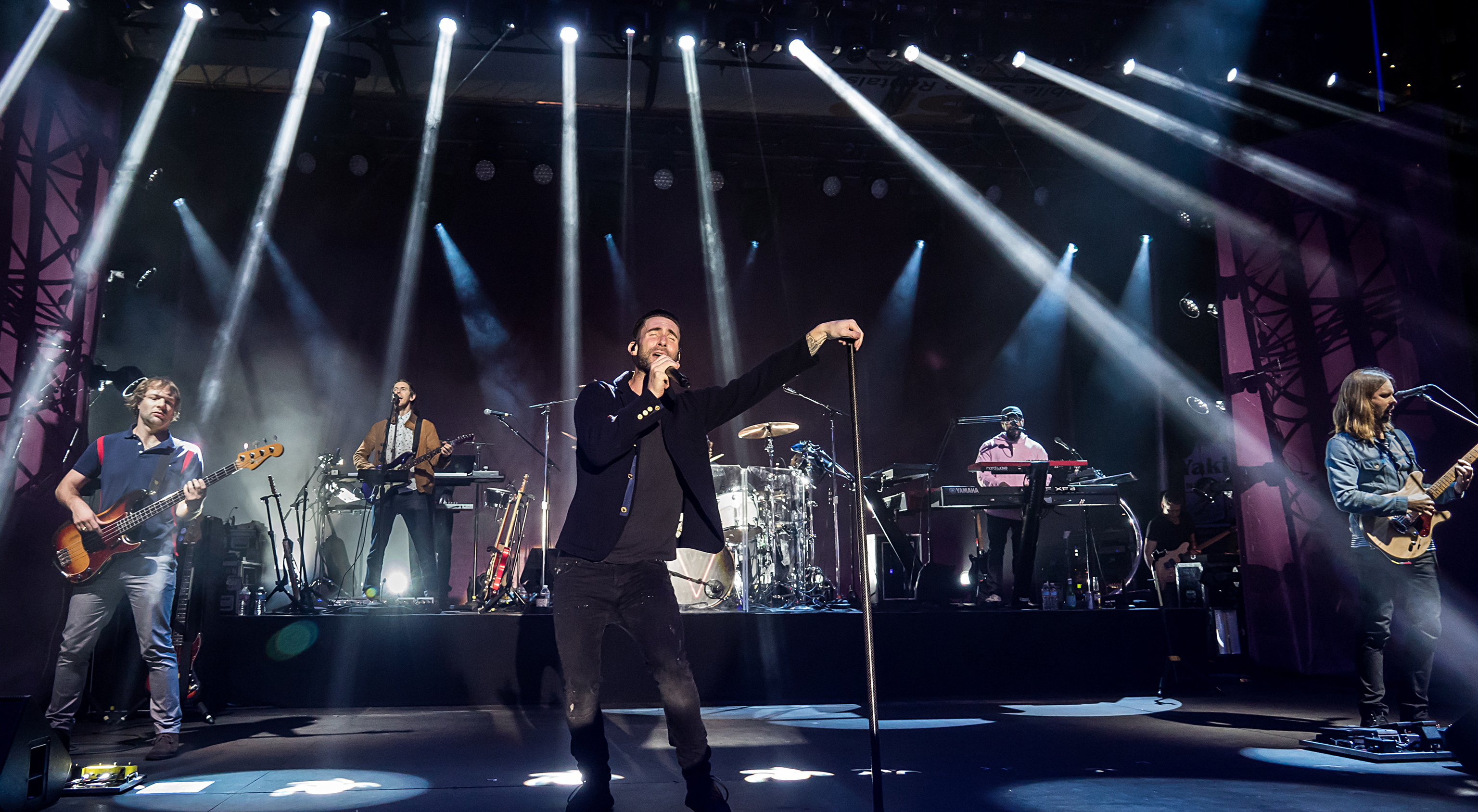
Maroon 5's cover of "Sex and Candy" received critical acclaim.

"Sex and Candy" appeared on the soundtrack albums for the films Hurricane Streets (1997) and Zack and Miri Make a Porno (2008). The song is included in "Polka Power!", a polka medley from "Weird Al" Yankovic's album Running with Scissors (1999). Will Hines of Vulture deemed Yankovic's rendition of "Sex and Candy" the comedic highlight of the medley. "Sex and Candy" was used in "Scratches," a 2009 episode of True Blood's second season. Sheila Dichoso of Paste wrote that the episode's use of the song was one of the show's "best musical moments." Jimmy Fallon parodied the song with Halloween-themed lyrics during a Weekend Update sketch on Saturday Night Live.

Maroon 5 released a slow, soul cover of the song as a bonus track on the album V (2014). Bustle deemed it the best song on the album and praised it for sounding different from Maroon 5's earlier work, while Idolator said the cover "is a well-executed reminder that the late '90s were, well, completely awesome." A version of "Sex and Candy" serves as the opening track of Slothrust's Show Me How You Want It To Be (2017), an EP of cover songs. Slothrust's arrangement of the song includes a classic rock-style guitar solo. Beth Bowles of Exclaim! enjoyed the cover, calling it "haunting and raw, closely comparable to the original but threaded with Slothrust's signature smoky grunge."

== Track listing ==
1. "Sex and Candy" – 2:54
2. "The Angel of the Forever Sleep" – 4:53
3. "Memphis" – 2:37

== Personnel ==
Personnel are adapted from the liner notes.

- John Wozniak – guitar, vocals
- Jared Kotler – bass, drums

== Charts ==
=== Weekly charts ===
Weekly chart performance for "Sex and Candy"
Chart (1997–1998)	Peak position
Australia (ARIA)	8
Austria (Ö3 Austria Top 40)	24
Canada Top Singles (RPM)	2
Canada Adult Contemporary (RPM)	27
Canada Rock/Alternative (RPM)	1
European Radio Top 50 (Music & Media)	37
Germany (GfK)	90
Iceland (Íslenski Listinn Topp 40)	4
Norway (VG-lista)	15
Quebec Airplay (ADISQ)	6
Scottish Singles Sales (Official Charts)	25
Spain Airplay (Music & Media)	13
Sweden (Sverigetopplistan)	21
UK Singles (Official Charts)	29
US Billboard Hot 100	8
US Adult Alternative Airplay (Billboard)	6
US Adult Pop Airplay (Billboard)	4
US Alternative Airplay (Billboard)	1
US Mainstream Rock (Billboard)	4
US Pop Airplay (Billboard)	3

=== Year-end charts ===
Year-end chart performance for "Sex and Candy"
Chart (1998)	Position
Australia (ARIA)	59
Canada Top Singles (RPM)	13
Canada Rock/Alternative (RPM)	2
US Billboard Hot 100	28
US Adult Top 40 (Billboard)	23
US Mainstream Rock Tracks (Billboard)	7
US Mainstream Top 40 (Billboard)	14
US Modern Rock Tracks (Billboard)	1
US Triple-A (Billboard)	20

== Certifications ==
Certifications and sales for "Sex and Candy"
Region	Certification	Certified units/sales
Australia (ARIA)	Gold	35,000^{^}
New Zealand (RMNZ)	Platinum	30,000^{‡}
^{^} Shipments figures based on certification alone.^{‡} Sales+streaming figures based on certification alone.

== See also ==
- 1997 in music
- List of Billboard number-one alternative singles of the 1990s
- List of one-hit wonders in the United States
