= Apollon Kalamarias F.C. =

Men's association football team in Greece

Apollon Kalamarias
- Full name: Μ.Γ.Σ. Απόλλων Καλαμαριάς
- Nicknames: Pontioi (Pontians); Rosoneri (Red-blacks); Tsamouria; Laspes (Muds)
- Founded: 24 January 1926; 100 years ago
- Ground: Kalamaria Stadium
- Capacity: 6,500
- Owner: Kostas Skotoris
- Chairman: Irini Baltidou
- Manager: Zoran Milinković
- League: Super League Greece 2
- 2025–26: Gamma Ethniki (Group 2), 1st (promoted)
- Website: https://mgskapollon.gr/
| Home colours | Away colours |

Apollon Kalamarias F.C. (Greek: Απόλλων Καλαμαριάς) is a Greek football club based in Kalamaria, a suburb of Thessaloniki. It was founded in 1926. The club is also known as Apollon Pontou.

== History ==
=== Formation and early years ===
==== 1926–1960 ====
Apollon Kalamarias was founded on 24 January 1926, in Kalamaria, by Pontian refugees. The original idea was to establish a club to disseminate the rich musical tradition of the Pontians, where members would gather to play mandolin and guitar. Thus, the head of Apollo, the god of music in ancient Greek mythology, was chosen as the emblem of the group. Later followed the founding of theater and sports departments. The colors chosen to represent the club were symbolic for the Pontian history: red for the blood of the people who lost their lives during the expulsion of the Pontians and black for the mourning. Emmanuel Majopoulos, the painter in the profession, was appointed first president. In 1927, the club entered the power of the Macedonian football clubs and participated for the first time in the Third Division Championship of Thessaloniki.

Old logo

In 1958, Apollon Kalamarias won the National Championship of Macedonia. The debut of the club in the First National Division took place on 25 October 1959, against Proodeftiki at Georgios Karaiskakis Stadium. The club completed one hundred games in this category on 2 December 1962, at the Toumba Stadium, defeating Olympiacos. A few days later, on 8 December, Nikitas Malioglou's team was "crowned" the first player in the history of the First National to complete the 100 entries.

==== 1961–1980 ====
Another footballer who linked his name to two remarkable achievements was Panagiotis Kyprianidis. He was the first football player to compete with the colors of Greece as he fought at Apollon Kalamarias (22 May 1963), and in the same summer he was the first footballer in the country to overcome the one million drachmas barrier for transcription, wearing Olympiacos shirt. For his part, another footballer, Kyriakos Mitariotis, completed 39 goals with Apollon Kalamarias' shirt in the First National Division, being the only player in the history of the club to have a similar achievement to date.

During the period 1964–1973, the club fell from the 1st National, to return on 23 September 1973, now on his own stadium. In 1976, Dimitris (Takis) Toboulidis joined the team. Latter, fought with the colors of the club until 1994, fighting in the center of defense. He is the player with the most participations in the history of Apollon Kalamarias in the First National Division, 233 in total.

==== 1981–2000 ====
On 4 September 1983, the first match of Apollon Kalamarias took place in the 1st National Division as Football Association (PAE) against PAOK at the Harilaou Stadium. In the 60' Ilias Chatzieleftheriou scored the first "professional" goal of Apollon Kalamarias in the big category. Ten years later, the club's victory over Apollon Athens on 4 April 1993, was important for the club's history as it achieved the 100th victory in the First National Division.

==== 2001–2026 ====
The team had been in and out of the Greek first division until international businessman and former owner of Kalamata, Stavros Papadopoulos, bought the team in 2001. Papadopoulos invested money into the team and brought in many young players from Brazil, and the team gained promotion to the Greek first division within two years. Papadopoulos has relinquished the running of the team since 2004.

During the 2007–08 season, Apollon Kalamarias competed in the 1st National Division and eventually deferred. However, this passage of the team by the Super League was to indirectly judge the champion of that year, through the evolution of the quirky "Wallner Case" (from the name of the Austrian footballer, Roman Wallner), who arrived to the International Sports Court of Lausanne (CAS), but eventually two days before the trial he withdrew the appeal.

In the next few months, the club was in a difficult financial position, with its debts amounting to 3.5 million, according to Apollon's major shareholder, Eftimis Solomonides. In December, four footballers filed an appeal, asking for the due ones, and at the same time terminating their contracts. The decision makers sought an amount of 300,000 euros for the direct payment of players' appeals, overdue installments, IKA and tax arrangements and the participation of the team in the 2nd National Championship. The submission of a participation statement outside the deadline of the Championship announcement led the historic club to the 4th National Division.

During the 2009–10 season, Apollon Kalamarias participated in the Championship of the 4th National Division taking the 6th place in the final classification of the 2nd group. In the following season, 2010–11, they took part in the 2nd Group Championship of the same category. Achieving the first place of the final rankings secured the rise in Football League 2. In the period 2012–13, Apollon Kalamarias took part in the Football League 2 Championship, where they managed to go to the Football League. In the period 2014–15, the club was downgraded but with a big win over PAOK, 1–0 in the Greek Cup.

During the years 2015–16 and 2016–17, Apollon competes in the Gamma Ethniki, while the football section has been taken over by the brothers Kalatzidis. In the period 2016–17, Apollon won the championship of the first group of the Gamma Ethniki and was promoted to the 2nd National Division.

After winning the championship of the first group of Gamma Ethniki, Apollon competed in the 2nd National Division during the years 2017-18 up until 2023-24 were Apollon got relegated.

During the 2024-25 season, Apollon set a goal to return to the professional leagues whilst they finished 3rd, the next season 2025-26, Apollon finished 1st in the 2nd group of Gamma Ethniki and afterwards they also finished 1st in the 2nd Groups Playoffs whilst also finishing 1st in the Promotion Group winning the Championship and securing the promotion to Super League 2.

== Crest and colours ==
=== Crest ===
The Pontic eagle in yellow and black forms the background of the team crest. From the beginning, the official emblem of the Komnenoi of Trebizond was the two-eyed eagle, which was also the symbol of the Byzantine Empire of the Paleologues. However, the emperor of Trebizond, John II (1280–1297), during his formal reception in Constantinople 1282) was forced by the Byzantine emperor Michael Palaiologos to be presented in front of him with a despot outfit and without the official Byzantine emblems of the eagles and the purple sandals. Immediately after the blessings of the marriage to Evdokia, John VI was honored the permission of the father of Michael Palaiologos to have imperial emblems, but with the eagle monochet and not bicephal. The monocoque but eagle, as a symbol of power and importance of the Greeks of Pontus, is distinguished from the oldest years, as seen in the coins of Sinope in the 4th century BC century. In coins, we see the eagle looking to the right. For proof we present the following: The 4 silver coins of Sinope in the 4th century BC century. located at the British Museum in London, all show the eagle with his head facing the right wing (as shown in the show we are publishing). The silver coins of Sinope in the 4th century BC, located in the Numismatic Museum in Athens, show the eagle looking to his right wing. In DH's book. Economet "Pontus and his Dikaia in this Hellenism", printed in Athens in 1920, and on page 146, the eagle of Sinopi's coin in the 4th century BC, has the eagle to look to his right feather. In David Talbot Rice's book "The Church of Hagia Sophia at Trebizond" published in 1968 in England, and on page 118, there is the full fresco painting of Emperor Manuel I who founded Hagia Sophia in Trebizond around 1250. This fresco, in normal size, was located in Hagia Sophia until 1850. Since then it has disappeared. In this fresco and the royal garments of the Emperor Manuel I there are over 15 eagles with their heads facing their right wing. All volumes of the Pontus archive have on the cover a coin of Sinope in the 4th century BC, showing the eagle's head tilted to the right of the wing. In 1961, titled "1461–1961 Memory of Empire of Great Komnenos" of the Pontian Studies Committee of Athens, the eagles are inclined to their right shoulders. The seal and the briefcases of the Pontian Studies Committee of Athens, since its foundation (1927), have the eagle facing the right wing. The Eagle of the Komnenoi of Trebizond at the Pontian Hero in Kallithea, Athens, looks towards its right wing. Conclusion: In the antiquity and era of the Komnena of Trebizond, the Greek Pontians had the monoheaded eagle on their emblem, with his head facing his right wing.

== Stadium ==
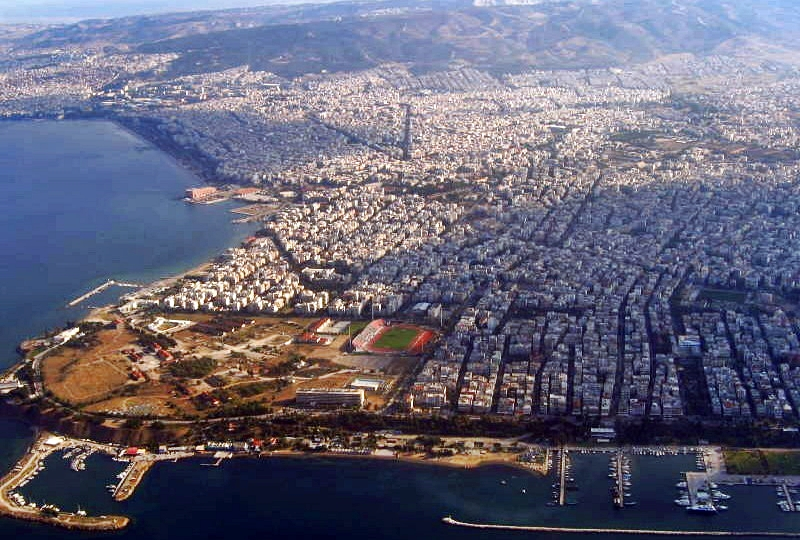
Kalamaria Stadium, aerial view

The stage of M.G.K.K. "Apollon" is located in the historical center of Kalamaria, a district of Thessaloniki. More specifically, it is located at the corner of Papagou & Chilis Street. It is located in the center of Kalamaria and access to it is very easy. The Apollon Pontou Stadium is private and is owned by the amateur Apollon. It has never been a Municipal Stadium and has not had a name for it. Apollon Pontou Stadium was one of the 2004 Olympic Games Training Centers and was last renovated in 2003 for the needs of the event.

It can accommodate 6,500 people (seated) but its capacity can exceed 8,000. It consists of a central rack divided into 6 doors. At Ports 3 & 4 there is a suitable space for the needs of journalists (journalistic theory). Port 6, with a capacity of about 1,000-1,500 people, is used for the needs of fans of the group. It is specially formulated and meets all safety requirements. The entire stadium is equipped with police cameras. In each door there are toilets of women and men and small cubs for the needs of the fans. Also, for any announcements that may arise there are loudspeakers at each door of the stage to inform the public.

Apollon Pontou's stadium is not only the headquarters of its football section, but it also offers many other possibilities. On the back of the ramp there is a floor with offices and halls. On the floor are hosted the offices of amateur and Football Club's management. There are also some small apartments for the hospitality of the athletes.

Below the pitch of the stadium there are also courts for training the athletes of Apollon Pontou. This year's basketball courts were also refurbished. In general, the coaching facilities under the stadium are made up of basketball, volleyball, boxing, but well-fitting gymnasiums. There are also showers, changing rooms and toilets. Apollon Stadium also hosts the team track division. There is a tartan with a coat suitable for the training of track and field athletes, who can visit the stadium in specific hours (public hours). In addition to racing and endurance events, track and field athletes have the ability to train in the long-distance sport as well as on sleigh rides. Apart from the central stadium, Apollon's facilities also include the 2 auxiliary football fields (grass and not plastic) for the training of the football sections and 5 tennis courts for the needs of the department. In tennis courts there is a cinema stand and next to a small café. The auxiliary football pitches and tennis courts are respectively right and left of the central stadium.

== Players ==
=== Current squad ===
As of 7 November 2026

Note: Flags indicate national team as defined under FIFA eligibility rules; some limited exceptions apply. Players may hold more than one non-FIFA nationality.

| No. | Pos. | Nation | Player |
|---|---|---|---|
| 1 | GK | GRE | Vangelis Syllektis |
| 2 | DF | ARG | Mateo Pérez |
| 3 | DF | GRE | Dimitrios Sgouris |
| 4 | DF | GRE | Georgios Samlidis |
| 5 | DF | GRE | Thomas Tsimpoukas |
| 6 | MF | GRE | Alexandros Piastopoulos (captain) |
| 7 | FW | GRE | Alexandros Rizos |
| 8 | MF | GRE | Georgios Prountzos |
| 9 | FW | GRE | Themis Patrinos |
| 10 | MF | GRE | Thomas Karaberis |
| 11 | MF | GRE | Alexandros Kedikoglou |
| 14 | MF | AUT | Dragoslav Burkic |
| 16 | MF | GRE | Spyros Zacharioudakis |
| 17 | MF | GRE | Georgios Ganopoulos |
| 19 | MF | GRE | Konstantinos Voriazidis |
| 20 | FW | GRE | Konstantinos Moschopoulos |
| 21 | DF | GRE | Georgios Tsapakidis |
| 22 | DF | GRE | Konstantinos Mytilineos |
| 23 | DF | GRE | Panagiotis Xygoros |

| No. | Pos. | Nation | Player |
|---|---|---|---|
| 24 | MF | ALB | Ntonalnto Atska |
| 25 | FW | ARG | Juan Cruz Kaprof |
| 28 | DF | SRB | Stefan Radić |
| 29 | FW | SMN | Jean-Baptiste Léo |
| 30 | FW | SEN | Tafsir Diop (on loan from Aris) |
| 33 | GK | GRE | Evangelos Trigatzis |
| 34 | FW | GRE | Dimitrios Kyriakidis |
| 44 | DF | ALB | Zog Djaloshi |
| 46 | MF | GRE | Stelios Almasidis |
| 50 | DF | BRA | Thomaz Kenedi |
| 67 | MF | GRE | Vasilios Athanasiou |
| 72 | MF | GRE | Georgios Marinos (on loan from Panserraikos) |
| 76 | MF | GRE | Giannis Spandonidis |
| 77 | DF | GRE | Georgios Manolakis |
| 80 | MF | GRE | Alexandros Lafkas (on loan from Aris) |
| 88 | MF | GRE | Ilias Drigakis |
| 91 | MF | GRE | Georgios Koulouris |
| 97 | GK | GRE | Ilias Kyritsis |

== Honours ==
=== Domestic ===
==== League ====
- Second Division
  - Winners (3): 1972–73, 1982–83, 1991–92
- Third Division
  - Winners (5): 1975–76, 1979–80, 2012–13, 2016–17, 2025–26
- Macedonia FCA
  - Winners (3): 1957–58, 1975–76, 2023–24,

== Seasons in the 21st century ==
| Season | Category | Position | Cup |
|---|---|---|---|
| 2000–01 | Beta Ethniki (2nd division) | 4th | GS |
| 2001–02 | Beta Ethniki (2nd division) | 4th | 2R |
| 2002–03 | Beta Ethniki (2nd division) | 3rd | R16 |
| 2003–04 | Beta Ethniki (2nd division) | 2nd | 1R |
| 2004–05 | Alpha Ethniki (1st division) | 12th | QF |
| 2005–06 | Alpha Ethniki (1st division) | **9th** | R16 |
| 2006–07 | Super League (1st division) | 12th | R16 |
| 2007–08 | Super League (1st division) | 16th | R16 |
| 2008–09 | Beta Ethniki (2nd division) | 12th | 3R |
| 2009–10 | Delta Ethniki (4th division) | 4th | 2R |
| 2010–11 | Delta Ethniki (4th division) | 1st | — |
| 2011–12 | Football League 2 (3rd division) | 4th | 2R |
| 2012–13 | Football League 2 (3rd division) | 1st | 1R |
| 2013–14 | Football League (2nd division) | 6th | 2R |
| 2014–15 | Football League (2nd division) | 11th | GS |
| 2015–16 | Gamma Ethniki (3rd division) | 5th | — |
| 2016–17 | Gamma Ethniki (3rd division) | 1st | — |
| 2017–18 | Football League (2nd division) | 7th | GS |
| 2018–19 | Football League (2nd division) | 7th | GS |
| 2019–20 | Super League 2 (2nd division) | 12th | 4R |
| 2020–21 | Football League (3rd division) | 9th | — |
| 2021–22 | Super League 2 (2nd division) | 10th | 3R |
| 2022–23 | Super League 2 (2nd division) | 11th | R16 |
| 2023–24 | Super League 2 (2nd division) | 12th | 3R |
| 2024–25 | Gamma Ethniki (3rd division) | 3rd | — |
| 2025–26 | Gamma Ethniki (3rd division) | 1st | — |
| 2026–27 | Super League 2 (2nd division) | | |

Best position in bold.

Key: 1R = First Round, 2R = Second Round, 3R = Third Round, 4R = Fourth Round, 5R = Fifth Round, GS = Group Stage, R16 = Round of 16, QF = Quarter-finals, SF = Semi-finals.

== Records and statistics ==
=== Most appearances and top scorers ===
Most appearances:

| Rank | Name | Apps |
|---|---|---|
| 1 | (Greece) Dimitrios Tompoulidis | 239 |
| 2 | (Greece) Dimitrios Nolis | 220 |
| 3 | (Greece) Kyriakos Mytariotis (Greece) Zisis Tsekos | 219 |
| 4 | (Greece) Triantafyllos Parmaxidis | 192 |
| 5 | (Greece) Dimitrios Amarantidis | 172 |

Top scorers:

| Rank | Name | Goals |
|---|---|---|
| 1 | (Greece) Dimitrios Nolis | 74 |
| 2 | (Greece) Kyriakos Mytariotis | 57 |
| 3 | (France) (Algeria) Karim Mouzaoui | 34 |
| 4 | (Brazil) Cleyton | 33 |
| 5 | (Greece) Zisis Tsekos (Greece) Theodoros Tsoleridis | 33 |
