= The Beautiful Madness EP =

EP by Stabilo Boss
- Released: February 2002
- Recorded: March 28, 2001
- Genre: Rock
- Length: 20:38
- Label: Independent

Stabilo Boss chronology
Stabilo Boss (2001)	The Beautiful Madness EP (2002)	Cupid? (2004)

The Beautiful Madness EP is an independently released EP by Stabilo Boss (now Stabilo). This EP is available in limited quantities.
There are two different copies known to be released. The first one is more rare, and has a solid black dot on the disc. The second one is similar, except it has the initials "sb" depicted inside the dot.
The song "Paperboy" was re-recorded for the album Cupid?, and the song "Beautiful Madness" was re-recorded for the album Happiness & Disaster.

== Track listing ==
1. "Beautiful Madness" – 5:39
2. "Laughing Nervously" – 6:37
3. "Paperboy" – 4:00
4. "Fantasy" – 4:20
