= Gene Kelton =

American singer-songwriter

Background information
- Also known as: Mean Gene Kelton
- Born: Sidney Eugene Kelton; April 10, 1953; Booneville, Mississippi, United States
- Died: December 28, 2010 (aged 57) Crosby, Texas
- Genres: Americana, blues-rock, Southern rock, rockabilly
- Occupations: Singer-songwriter, guitarist
- Instruments: Vocals, guitar, harmonica
- Years active: c. 1972–2010
- Website: "Official website". Archived from the original on August 31, 2012.

Gene Kelton (April 10, 1953 – December 28, 2010) was an American guitarist, harmonica player and singer-songwriter, based in Houston, Texas. He played Americana, blues-rock, Southern rock, and rockabilly music.

== Blues roots ==
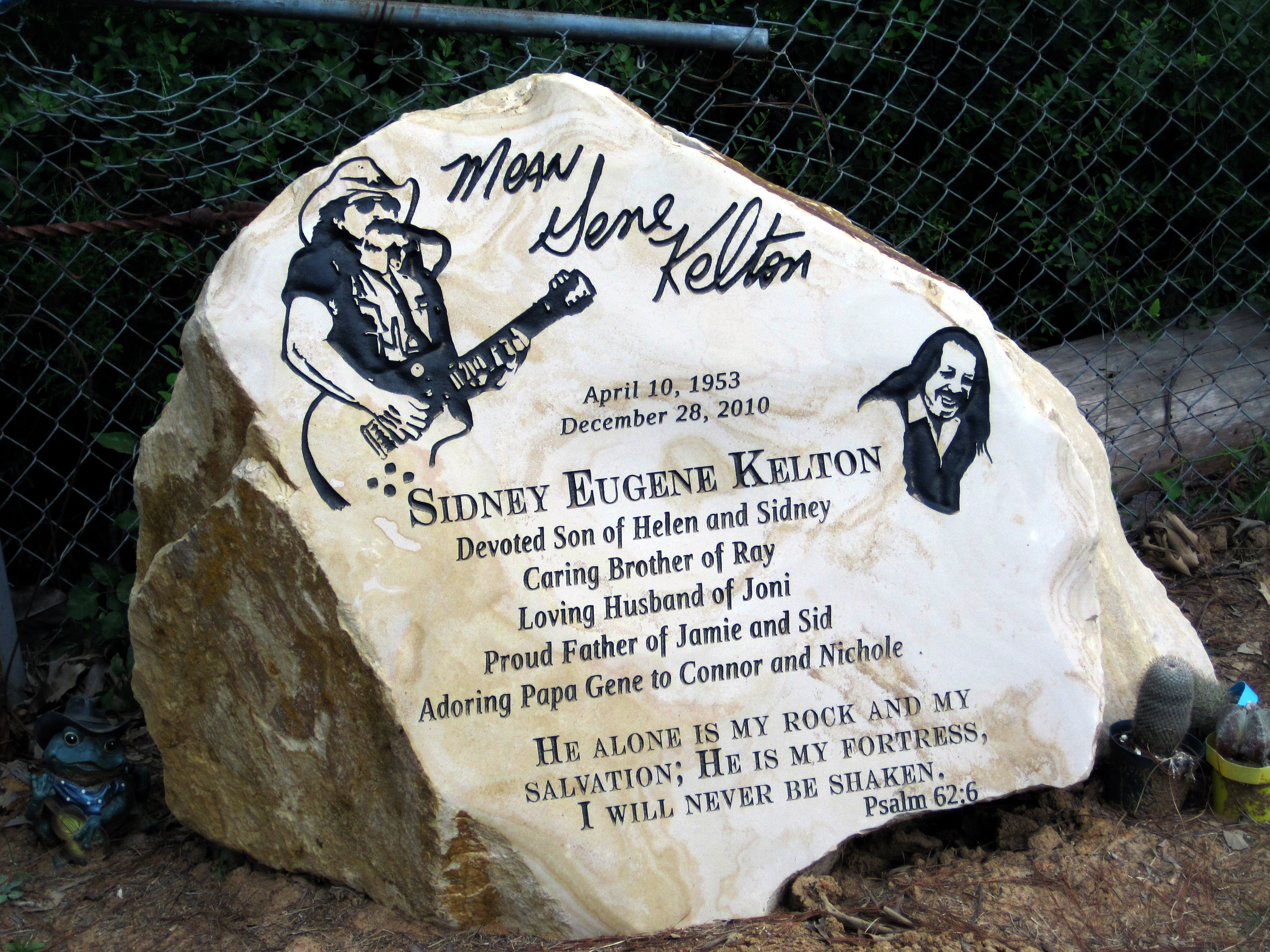
Mean Gene Kelton's Grave stone

Born Sidney Eugene Kelton, in Booneville, Mississippi, United States, his mother sang gospel music on the radio. She divorced his ne'er-do-well father when he was six. Afterward, they lived with his grandfather, a cotton plantation sharecropper. On weekends, he listened to down-home blues in a dirt-floored juke joint. His step father, Bob Allbritton, who played rock and roll guitar then in a manner, as it can be said that Conway Twitty, sang country songs, exposed Kelton to all types of music. His mother bought him a Sears Silvertone guitar at the age of ten, and they moved to Texas where he formed his first band, The Moven Shadows. Following a serious motorcycle accident, he played with several cover bands until "giving up" music after his first marriage. It took years of moving through various jobs, getting back into music after a divorce, and trying for a few years to get together a band, going through what he called "the worst of the worst" musicians, before he finally formed The Gene Kelton Band with bass player A. J. Fee and drummer Russel Shelby, around the time of a national blues revival sparked by Stevie Ray Vaughan. Kelton has been a full-time musician since 1983, when he began playing for tips in bars after losing his DJ job while newlywed in his second marriage and, in desperate straits, trying to support his unemployed bride and two sons from his previous marriage. While publishing Texas Blues magazine in the early 1990s, he lost everything but the rights to his songs in his second divorce. The band went through another name, The Love Buzzards, before fans called them "die hards" for playing long sessions in the hot sun suggesting their final revision. Finally, a demo tape played on KPFT helped Kelton raise enough money to release his first album. Another musician saying, "Gene you play a really mean guitar," led to his nickname and the title of the group's second album.

== Die Hard career ==
In 1992, he named his current band The Die Hards, under which name they have been playing ever since. At the time of his death, Kelton was playing with drummer Ted McCumber and bass guitarist Ed Starkey (who has played with such names as the Dottie West Band).

In December 1999, he released his first blues CD (Jambone Records), Most Requested. The album was quickly picked up by several Houston Radio stations, occupying the No. 1 call-in request on some of these stations. In addition to radio coverage, which garnered him mainly local attention, his popularity spread online through such sites as mp3.com where various songs from Most Requested remained at the top 10 for two years. Kelton's making his music available for download on the internet has resulted in a listener base spanning the globe with over 150 radio stations around the world carrying his music and an average of over 150,000 hits per month on his website.

In 2003, he released his second blues CD Mean Guitar.

In 2007, Kelton released Going Back To Memphis: A Biker Band Tribute To Elvis, a tribute to the Elvis Presley, recorded in Sun Studios.

== Style ==
Kelton's songs are most notable for powerful guitar and lyrics that range from emotional to raunchy. His raunchier songs often use innuendo, with lyrics that taken literally are perfectly benign. Such songs include: "The Avon Man", "Let Me Pump Your Gas", and "Two Thangs". Others are a little more overt in their sexuality, such as "The Texas City Dyke", "My Blow Up Lover", and, his most well-known tune, "My Baby Don't Wear No Panties", which Kelton began improvising to the tune of "Mean Mistreater" in 1988 when, after a drunken girl jumped up on a bar table, ripped off her shirt and began dancing, a guy yelled out, "That ain't nothing, my baby don't wear no panties." Eventually it evolved into the current audience participation version with fans shouting, "How do you know?" after each chorus. Discovering how audiences respond to songs with sexual innuendos, Kelton really caught their attention by beginning "The Texas City Dyke", "She's got tattoos on her titties." Gradually he developed this into his song by using all the jokes he had heard about this landmark fishing dike.

Some of his songs have a more pained or melancholy feeling to them. Examples are the nostalgic songs "Cruisin' Texas Avenue" and "Leaving Paradise". Another common theme in several of his songs is the power of the blues. Songs like "Sweet Mother Blues" and "If Everybody Loved The Blues", extol blues music as having remarkable properties, like being able to end war and having "almighty healin' powers".

Self-described as a performing "black leather blues and redneck rock 'n roll," Mean Gene Kelton & The Die Hards have been called by ReverbNation "one of the top Biker Rally and Blues Festival headliner acts."

== Death ==
Kelton was killed on December 28, 2010, when his SUV collided head-on with a school bus in Crosby, Texas, three days before he was due to perform on New Year's Eve at Rowdy Buck's in Crosby, Texas.

== Discography ==
- Most Requested (1999)
- Mean Guitar (2003)
- Going Back To Memphis: A Biker Band Tribute To Elvis (2007)
- The Lost Sessions – unpublished but available at shows

== Filmography ==
- The Passage (2011)
