= Zisis Tsekos =

Greek footballer (born 1964)

Personal information
- Full name: Zisis Tsekos
- Date of birth: 29 August 1964 (age 62)
- Place of birth: Greece
- Position: Midfielder

Senior career*
Years	Team	Apps	(Gls)
1981–1985	Panthrakikos	96	(13)
1985–1987	Panserraikos	44	(17)
1987–1995	Apollon Kalamarias	219	(26)
1995–1997	Paniliakos	57	(6)
1997–1999	Ethnikos Asteras	51	(2)
1999–2000	Olympiacos Volos	13	(0)
Total		480	(64)

International career
1990	Greece	1	(0)
- * Club domestic league appearances and goals

Zisis Tsekos (Greek: Ζήσης Τσέκος; born 29 August 1964) is a former Greek footballer.

== Club career ==
Tsekos joined Panserraikos in the Alpha Ethniki in July 1985, after four seasons with Panthrakikos in the lower divisions. He joined Apollon Kalamarias in July 1987, where he would play until moving to Paniliakos in July 1995.

== International career ==
Tsekos made one appearance for the Greece national football team in March 1990 against Israel.
