= Kidding Ourselves =

2006 single by Stabilo

Single by Stabilo

from the album Happiness and Disaster
- Released: July 2006
- Genre: Rock
- Length: 4:25
- Label: EMI Canada
- Songwriter: Jesse Dryfhout
- Producer: Brad Wood

Stabilo singles chronology
"Flawed Design" (2006)	"Kidding Ourselves" (2006)	"Don't Look in Their Eyes"

"Kidding Ourselves" is a song by Canadian rock band Stabilo. It is the second single from their album Happiness and Disaster, their second album with EMI Canada.

A music video has also been released, directed by Graydon Sheppard. It was on medium rotation on MuchMusic. The video received the Much Music Video Fact Award on March 31, 2006.

The acoustic version of "Kidding Ourselves" was released May 23, 2006 as a digital download.

== Chart positions ==
Chart (2006)	Peak position
Canada Hot AC (Radio & Records)	21
