= Flawed Design =

Single by Stabilo

from the album Happiness and Disaster
- Released: January 17, 2006
- Genre: Indie rock
- Length: 3:47
- Label: EMI
- Songwriters: Jesse Dryfhout, Kevin Kadish, Christopher John
- Producer: Brad Wood

Stabilo singles chronology
"One More Pill"	"Flawed Design" (2006)	"Kidding Ourselves" (2006)

"Flawed Design" is a song by Canadian indie rock band Stabilo. It was released in January 2006 as the first single from their album Happiness and Disaster. The song has been performed live since at least May 2004, but was not released on an album until April 4, 2006. It received significant radio airplay across Canada.

== Content ==
The flaws that the song mentions include lying, temptation, trust, deviousness, and treason.

== Music video ==
The music video, directed by Stephen Scott, shows several scenarios where people have flaws that they lie about, such as cheating and bribery.

== Awards ==
- May 16, 2006: Received the SOCAN award for No. 1 Song for topping Canadian Music Network's Hot Adult Contemporary Chart.
- September 2006: Digital Download Certified Gold (CRIA)
- November 19, 2007: Received the SOCAN award for greatest number of plays on Canadian radio for 2006.

== Chart positions ==
Chart (2006)	Peak position
Canada CHR/Pop Top 40 (Radio & Records)	21
Canada Hot AC Top 40 (Radio & Records)	1
Canada Rock Top 30 (Radio & Records)	18
