= Koulouri (disambiguation) =

Koulouri may refer to:

- Greek language term for the circular simit bread
- Former name of Salamis Island
- Singular version of koulouria
