= Zog BogBean – From the Marcy Playground =

Zog BogBean - From the Marcy Playground

Studio album by John Wozniak
- Released: 1990
- Genre: Alternative
- Label: Independent

Zog BogBean – From the Marcy Playground is an album, self-produced and recorded by John Wozniak in his bedroom studio with some help from his then-girlfriend Sherry Fraser and her brother, Scott. A small run of CDs were self-released by Wozniak, and they remain extremely difficult to find to this day. "Our Generation" and "Dog And His Master" would appear on later Marcy Playground albums.

As of April 2009, Zog Bogbean is available for download at Marcy Playground's official site as well as other outlets such as iTunes.

== Track list ==
All tracks are written by John Wozniak, except where noted

No.	Title	Length
1.	"Our Generation"	4:45
2.	"Hear My Train A Coming" (Jimi Hendrix)	3:47
3.	"The Dog And His Master"	2:15
4.	"John Fisher Ford"	2:25
5.	"People Are People" (Sherry Fraser)	0:40
6.	"The Ballad Of Aslan"	3:44
7.	"From The Marcy Playground"	6:06
8.	"Alice And Everything"	2:24
9.	"Twinkle By Joe" (traditional)	0:52
10.	"The Tale Of Captain Mcguire"	4:51
11.	"My Favorite Tree In Fall"	2:03
12.	"Here Comes Summer" (Sherry Fraser)	3:31

== Personnel ==
- John Wozniak
- Sherry Fraser (Here Comes Summer, People are People)
- Scott Fraser (drums)
- Dylan Keefe (Bass)
