= Stabilo Boss (album) =

Studio album by Stabilo Boss
- Released: Mid 2001
- Recorded: June–July 2000
- Genre: Rock
- Length: 51:45
- Label: Independent
- Producer: Matthew J Doughty / Chris Davies

Stabilo Boss chronology
| Kitchen Sessions (1999) | Stabilo Boss (2001) | The Beautiful Madness EP (2002) |

Stabilo Boss is the self-titled first full-length album by Stabilo Boss (now Stabilo). This album was produced and engineered by Northern Californians Matthew J Doughty (sometimes credited as Matt Doughty) and Chris Davies, and was released independently across Canada and the USA.
After the success of their single "Everybody", Stabilo Boss was the only indie band nominated in the Best New Rock Band category at the 2003 Canadian Radio Music Awards.

== Track listing ==
1. "One More Pill" – 5:12
2. "Middle Of The Night" – 5:00
3. "Thing" – 5:41
4. "Penny Pass" – 4:38
5. "Everybody" – 3:58
6. "Gateway" – 6:07
7. "Into The Blind" – 3:56
8. "Donovan" – 7:27
9. "Breathe A Lot" – 4:43
10. "Tumble" – 4:58
