= Zod =

Zod may refer to:

- General Zod, a DC Comics character and enemy of Superman
- Zod (Gobots), a villain from Challenge of the GoBots
- Zod, now Sotk, a village in Armenia
- Zod (Typescript Library), a TypeScript validation library

== See also ==
- Zed (disambiguation)
