= Georgios Koulouris =

Greek footballer

Personal information
- Date of birth: 22 July 2004 (age 22)
- Place of birth: Corfu, Greece
- Height: 1.74 m (5 ft 9 in)
- Positions: Winger; central midfielder

Team information
- Current team: Apollon Kalamarias
- Number: 91

Youth career
- 2016–2021: PAOK

Senior career*
Years	Team	Apps	(Gls)
2021–2026	PAOK B	31	(1)
2024	→ Makedonikos (loan)	8	(0)

International career
2021	Greece U19	2	(0)
- * Club domestic league appearances and goals as of 20 April 2026

Georgios Koulouris (Greek: Γεώργιος Κουλούρης; born 22 July 2004) is a Greek professional footballer who plays as a winger for Super League 2 club Apollon Kalamarias.
