= Most Requested =

Studio album by Gene Kelton
- Released: 2000
- Genre: Rockabilly
- Label: Jambone Records

Most Requested is the debut album for "Mean" Gene Kelton and the Die Hards. It was released in 2000 by Jambone Records. It contains 15 of the most requested songs from the band's live performances.

== Track listing ==
All Tracks by Mean Gene Kelton

1. "Texas Honey"
2. "Too White To Play The Blues"
3. "If This Guitar Could Talk"
4. "Tears On My Guitar"
5. "Going Back To Memphis"
6. "Cruisin Texas Avenue"
7. "Sinking Deeper (Into The Blues)"
8. "Big Legged Mama"
9. "Leaving Paradise"
10. "The Avon Man"
11. "Little Black Dress"
12. "My Blow Up Lover"
13. "Let Me Pump Your Gas"
14. "The Texas City Dyke"
15. "My Baby Don't Wear No Panties"
