= Zog Djaloshi =

Albanian footballer

Personal information
- Date of birth: 23 February 2000 (age 26)
- Place of birth: Tirana, Albania
- Height: 1.92 m (6 ft 4 in)
- Position: Centre-back

Team information
- Current team: Apollon Kalamarias
- Number: 44

Youth career
- Aris

Senior career*
Years	Team	Apps	(Gls)
2018–2019	PO Nea Kallikratia		
2019–2022	Trikala	43	(1)
2022–2024	Apollon Pontus	45	(1)
2024–2025	Diagoras	14	(0)
2025–2026	Niki Volos	7	(0)
2026–	Apollon Kalamarias	0	(0)
- * Club domestic league appearances and goals as of 20 April 2026

Zog Djaloshi (born 23 February 2000) is an Albanian professional footballer who plays as a centre-back for Greek Super League 2 club Apollon Kalamarias.
