= Vityazevo =

Vityazevo (Russian: Витязево) is the name of several rural localities in Russia:

- Vityazevo, Kostroma Oblast, a village in Sidorovskoye Settlement of Krasnoselsky District of Kostroma Oblast
- Vityazevo, Krasnodar Krai, a village in Vityazevsky Rural Okrug under the administrative jurisdiction of the Town of Anapa in Krasnodar Krai
