= Marcy Playground =

American rock band

- From left to right: Shlomi Lavie, Dylan Keefe and John Wozniak

Background information
- Origin: Minneapolis, Minnesota, U.S. New York City, New York, U.S.
- Genres: Alternative rock; power pop; post-grunge
- Years active: 1994–present
- Label: Capitol
- Members: John Wozniak; Dylan Keefe; Shlomi Lavie
- Past members: Dan Rieser; Gonzalo Martinez de la Cotera; Jared Kotler; Glenn Braver; Conor Levis; Mack Santora
- Website: www.marcyplayground.net

Marcy Playground is an American alternative rock band consisting of three members: John Wozniak (lead vocals, guitar), Dylan Keefe (bass), and Shlomi Lavie (drums). The band is best known for their 1997 hit "Sex and Candy", which spent close to four months as No. 1 on Billboard's Modern Rock Tracks chart.

== History ==
=== Early years ===
The band is named after the Marcy Open School in Minneapolis, which is the alternative school John Wozniak attended. He chose the name because many of his songs were inspired by his childhood. Marcy Playground emerged in the late 1990s. Influences include David Bowie, Paul Simon, Neil Young, Van Morrison, Jimi Hendrix, Syd Barrett of Pink Floyd, Nirvana, Wham! and the Beatles. Frontman John Wozniak's first effort, Zog BogBean – From the Marcy Playground, was self-produced, recorded in his bedroom studio with some help from his then-girlfriend Sherry Fraser and her brother Scott in the early nineties. A limited run of CDs were self-released by Wozniak. "Our Generation" and "Dog and His Master", two songs found on Wozniak's Zog BogBean project, would appear on later Marcy Playground albums. As of April 2009, Zog BogBean was available for download at Marcy Playground's official site as well as other outlets such as iTunes.

=== Marcy Playground (1994–1998) ===
After attending the Evergreen State College for two years, Wozniak moved east to New York, in order to work with multi-instrumentalist producer Jared Kotler, who John had known from suburban Philadelphia. Jared believed in John's songwriting talent and put together money with his cousin Jeff White in order to pay for and produce the duo, along with studio musician Glenn Braver(bassist) to record at Sabella Recording Studios in nearby Roslyn, New York. After hearing the two records worth of material Jared produced of John's songs, Capitol Records became interested in the music. Kurt Rosenwinkel, a mutual friend, introduced bassist Dylan Keefe to John Wozniak and Marcy Playground began performing in NYC. The band was signed to Capitol in 1995 and they performed a series of NYC club dates that would be the first incarnation of Marcy Playground as a band. Personal problems between John and Jared reached a peak after a year of playing the New York music scene and drummer Dan Rieser was brought in to replace Jared whose interest was producing other artists. The self-titled album was released in 1997, with the first single, "Poppies", released soon after.

Marcy Playground emerged into the mainstream with the success of the single "Sex and Candy". The song spent 15 weeks at No. 1 on the Billboard Modern Rock Tracks chart. The album went platinum and managed to spawn two other singles, "Saint Joe on the School Bus" and "Sherry Fraser". Marcy Playground is quiet and minimalist in tone. Wozniak's songs run in different styles: some are modern folk music; many have undertones reminiscent of children's songs; the blurred sound of psychedelia makes appearances; and then there are the songs with a clear rock sound.

=== Shapeshifter (1999–2000) ===
Marcy Playground's next outing was 1999's Shapeshifter. Shapeshifter was released on November 2, 1999.

A minor controversy came to light when Paul Leary of the Butthole Surfers revealed on Marcy Playground's website forum that the cover art (a painting by Mark Ryden) had originally been conceptualized and commissioned by Leary for his band's aborted After the Astronaut album. He admitted to being a fan of Marcy Playground and Leary's outrage was eased once he learned that Capitol Records, former home of the Butthole Surfers and then-current home of Marcy Playground, had pitched the artwork to Wozniak as original work from its own art department and that Marcy Playground had no knowledge of the work's origins. Upon learning the truth, Wozniak proclaimed that he was "honored" to have an album cover designed by Paul Leary.

"It's Saturday", the album's lead single, managed to hit No. 25 on the Modern Rock Charts, and followed by a second single, "Bye Bye".

After Shapeshifter, drummer Dan Rieser left the band to pursue other interests. The position was eventually filled on his recommendation by Gonzalo "Gonz" Martinez de la Cotera, a friend whose previous band Lincoln had opened for Marcy Playground.

=== MP3 (2004–2006) ===
After a considerable hiatus, Marcy Playground recorded a follow-up to Shapeshifter. Marcy Playground's third album, MP3, was released in 2004.

Marcy Playground did some touring in support of MP3. The album's first single, "Deadly Handsome Man", was a song featured on the Jay and Silent Bob Strike Back movie soundtrack a few years earlier under its original title, "The Devil's Song". The second single, "Punk Rock Superstar", surprised many fans while bringing in some new ones, when it was featured on the Xbox 360's playlist upon its release in 2006. Other singles from the album include "Blood in Alphabet Soup" and "No One's Boy"; both were featured on promotional ads for MP3. One album track, "Paper Dolls", was co-written by Jimi Haha of the alternative rock band Jimmie's Chicken Shack. On the track titled "Hotter Than the Sun", Wozniak reflects on the band's one-time success and remains positive about the band's future.

=== Leaving Wonderland...in a Fit of Rage (2009) ===
Marcy Playground's fourth album, Leaving Wonderland... in a Fit of Rage, was released on July 7, 2009. Originally conceived as a solo record by John Wozniak, he brought Dylan Keefe into the project and the record was released under the band's name. Leaving Wonderland features 12 songs, including the singles "Good Times" and "Blackbird". Also included on the record is a version of "Memphis", a Marcy Playground B-side that Wozniak's wife felt deserved a second breath of life. Sherry Fraser, Wozniak's longtime friend and lead vocalist of Two Ton Boa (a.k.a. 222), designed the album cover. Leaving Wonderland was coproduced, recorded and mixed by Jeff Dawson.

After Gonzalo Martinez's departure from the band, Electro Morocco drummer Shlomi Lavie stepped in for the band's 2009 tour. Lavie, an Israeli-American, was referred to lead singer John Wozniak by bassist Dylan Keefe's wife, who is one of Shlomi's best friends.. After a successful 4-day Carnival Cruise show in the Bahamas alongside post-grunge band Sponge, it was announced that the band would tour for the spring of 2009, playing in venues along the California coastline, including the Key Club, as well as cities in Canada and North Carolina.

=== Indaba Remixes from Wonderland (2010–2011) ===
Marcy Playground's fifth release, Indaba Remixes from Wonderland, was released on September 28, 2010. Indaba Remixes from Wonderland is a new CD and digital collection of remixes from Marcy Playground's 2009 album Leaving Wonderland...in a fit of rage. Marcy Playground partnered with Indaba Music to offer fans the opportunity to remix songs from the Leaving Wonderland album. Marcy Playground then selected its favorite mixes from hundreds submitted to be included on Indaba. This is the first time Marcy Playground had an album produced exclusively from fan submitted remixes to Indaba Music where the winners received royalties from album sales.

John Wozniak stated: "I wanted to make this record to show people what the online music community is capable of. I believe the talent reflected in these tracks speaks for itself. This community is thriving. It's thriving because musicians feed on inspiration they get from other musicians. Music is not meant to be a solitary endeavor; it's something we like to do with other people."

Marcy Playground was to tour many venues in support of the album through 2010.

=== Lunch, Recess & Detention (2012) ===
Marcy Playground announced in mid-June 2012 that they will be releasing a compilation of rarities, B-sides, and new material on July 17, 2012 titled Lunch, Recess & Detention. The album's first single, "Mr. Fisher", was released on June 26, 2012. Marcy Playground joined Everclear, Sugar Ray, Lit, and the Gin Blossoms on the Summerland Tour 2012.

== Band members ==
Current

- John "Woz" Wozniak – guitar, lead vocals (1996–present)
- Dylan Keefe – bass, backing vocals (1996–present)
- Shlomi Lavie – drums, backing vocals (2009–present)

Former

- Jared Kotler – drums, bass, backing vocals (1996–1997)
- Dan Rieser – drums, backing vocals (1997–2000)
- Gonzalo "Gonz" Martinez de la Cotera – drums, backing vocals (2000–2009)
- Conor Levis – backing vocals

== Discography ==
=== Studio albums ===
Title	Album details	Peak chart positions					Certifications (sales threshold)
Title	Album details	US	US Heat	AUS	CAN	UK	Certifications (sales threshold)
Marcy Playground	Released: February 25, 1997; Label: Capitol	21	1	28	16	61	RIAA: Platinum; ARIA: Gold; MC 2× Platinum
Shapeshifter	Released: November 2, 1999; Label: Capitol	—	—	—	—	—	
MP3	Released: March 23, 2004; Label: Reality Entertainment	—	—	—	—	—	
Leaving Wonderland... in a Fit of Rage	Released: July 7, 2009; Label: Woz	—	—	—	—	—	
"—" denotes releases that did not chart

=== Remix albums ===
Title	Album details
Indaba Remixes from Wonderland	Released: September 28, 2010; Label: Capitol, EMI America

=== Compilation albums ===
Year	Album details
Lunch, Recess & Detention	Released: July 17, 2012; Label: Capitol

=== Singles ===
Year	Single	Peak chart positions							Album
Year	Single	US	US Alt.	US Main	AUS	CAN	CAN Alt	UK	Album
1997	"Poppies"	—	—	—	—	—	—	—	Marcy Playground
1997	"Saint Joe on the School Bus"	—	8	30	—	—	—	—	Marcy Playground
1997	"Sex and Candy"	8	1	4	8	2	1	29	Marcy Playground
1998	"Sherry Fraser"	—	—	—	—	—	—	—	Marcy Playground
1999	"Comin' Up from Behind"	—	—	—	—	—	—	—	Cruel Intentions soundtrack
1999	"It's Saturday"	—	25	—	—	—	14	—	Shapeshifter
1999	"Bye Bye"	—	—	—	—	—	—	—	Shapeshifter
2004	"Deadly Handsome Man"	—	—	—	—	—	—	—	MP3
2004	"Punk Rock Superstar"	—	—	—	—	—	—	—	MP3
2004	"No One's Boy"	—	—	—	—	—	—	—	MP3
2004	"Blood in Alphabet Soup"	—	—	—	—	—	—	—	MP3
2009	"Good Times"	—	—	—	—	—	—	—	Leaving Wonderland...In a Fit of Rage
2009	"Starbaby"	—	—	—	—	—	—	—	Leaving Wonderland...In a Fit of Rage
2012
2012	"Mr. Fisher"	—	—	—	—	—	—	—	Lunch, Recess & Detention
"—" denotes releases that did not chart

=== EPs ===
- It's Saturday College Sampler EP (1999)

=== Soundtracks featuring Marcy Playground ===
- Hurricane Streets
- Cruel Intentions
- Antitrust
- Simply Irresistible
- Jay and Silent Bob Strike Back
- Zack and Miri Make a Porno
- Wonder Park
- Under the Bridge

=== Cover songs ===
- Jimi Hendrix - Hear My Train A Comin' (Zog BogBean - From the Marcy Playground)
- Two Ton Boa - Comin' Up from Behind (Cruel Intentions movie soundtrack)
- Grateful Dead - And We Bid You Goodnight (live)
- Neil Young - Needle and the Damage Done (live)
- Leonard Cohen - Hallelujah (live)

=== Music videos ===
Release date	Title	Director	Filming location
October 1997	"Sex and Candy"	Jamie Caliri	Los Angeles, Fall 1997
June 1998	"Saint Joe on the School Bus"	Hammer & Tongs	Toronto, Spring 1998
September 1998	"Sherry Fraser"	Kevin Kerslake	Mojave Desert, Indian Wells, California, Summer 1998
March 1999	"Comin' Up from Behind"	Jamie Caliri	New York City, Winter 1999
October 1999	"It's Saturday"	Peter Christopherson	Toronto, Fall 1999
2004	"Punk Rock Superstar"	Daniel Liss	Euphoria Studios in New York City and on tour across the U.S., 2004

== Touring partners ==
- Jolene (1997)
- Toad the Wet Sprocket (1997, 2023)
- Lincoln (1998)
- Fastball (1998)
- Everclear (1998)
- Sonichrome (1998)
- Pete Droge (1998)
- Pure (1998)
- Babe the Blue Ox (1998)
- Blinker the Star (1999)
- Sponge (2008) - Rock the Bahamas Cruise
- Evoka (2009)
- Summerland Tour (2012) - Sugar Ray, Everclear, Lit, Gin Blossoms
- Summerland Tour (2018) - Everclear, Local H
