= Dylan Keefe =

- Dylan Keefe (middle) as part of Marcy Playground

Background information
- Born: April 11, 1970 (age 56); Minneapolis, Minnesota
- Genres: Alternative rock, grunge, folk rock, modern rock, pop rock, indie rock, psychedelic rock
- Instruments: Bass, vocals
- Years active: 1994–present
- Label: Deep South Entertainment

Dylan Keefe (born April 11, 1970, in Minneapolis, Minnesota) is the bassist and one of the founding members of the multi-platinum selling alternative rock band Marcy Playground.

== Marcy Playground ==
Keefe, along with vocalist John Wozniak and drummer Jared Kotler, founded Marcy Playground in 1994.

Although Keefe grew up in the same city as Wozniak, the two never met until both moved to NY and met through a mutual friend, acclaimed jazz guitarist Kurt Rosenwinkel. Before joining Marcy Playground, he attended the Berklee Music College of Boston with the band's ex-drummer Dan Reiser, with whom he played in various jazz projects together.

Keefe is known for being the shy yet funny guy in Marcy Playground. Aside from providing bass guitar for Marcy Playground, he contributed backing vocals on many of the songs on the band's second album, Shapeshifter. His musical influences include Radiohead, classic rock, and jazz.

== May 31, 1995 ==
A quote from Dylan Keefe about a day that forever changed his life:

"I can divide my personal history into two distinct parts; pre and post May 31, 1995.

"On that day my father, an accomplished artist and architect, took his own life. He had always been my greatest inspiration, my wisest confidant, my biggest fan, and my best friend. He was insanely talented, amazingly kind, and aggressively charming. But most of all, although we played in different mediums, he was my artistic soul mate. Somehow, with him in the world, it was easier to chose [sic] a life in the ridiculous pursuit of artistic endeavors. Being totally and completely understood by someone has a way of dissolving self-doubt into bite size pieces."

"That very same late spring day, before I received that heart-crushing news, I also met John Wozniak. As Minneapolis ex pats living in New York City, we quickly learned that we were from the same town, grew up with similar record collections, and had poor but intellectually stimulating parents that sent us to experimental grade schools. The Marcy Open School was the sister to mine on the other side of town. We were kindred misfit guinea pigs that had been tagged and released into the wild of the normal world."

"In these times, when its easy for the Privileged such as myself, to just up 'n run away from one's hometown in search of a new identity, it's not everyday that you meet those people that REALLY know where you're coming from."

"I'm sure some of you that have lost loved ones are familiar with the feeling of being shaken by the irreverence in which life just goes on without them. To this day, I cannot believe that my dad never got to know about Marcy Playground the band, or that Woz and he never met. Because it seems to me as though they had always known each other. Instead, they just passed each other by a few hours along my personal time line."

"On that day, when my whole world was falling to shit, I got lucky...or maybe blessed or something. Because somehow, just when I really needed some sense of where I came from, and a reminder of why I do what I do, spoken in a language that I can understand, I met Woz. And although John is far from a father figure to me (he's more like the little brother I need to protect from others so I can beat on him myself later), my dad, like a successful drug deal, delivered something to him from under his sleeve as he passed from my street corner. What I got was a musical soul mate. What you get is Marcy Playground."

== Today ==
Although Keefe is still a part of the rock trio today, for a limited time he was the Technical Director for the weekly public radio program On the Media, based in New York City, and the Technical Director on another NYC-based public radio program The Takeaway. He now serves as the Director of Sound Design for Radiolab. He is currently busy touring the continent, rocking crowds with the band that gained him his stardom, as well as drawing and painting.

== Equipment ==
Dylan uses a Fender bass guitar.
