= John Wozniak =

American musician (born 1971)

- John Wozniak (right) as part of Marcy Playground

Background information
- Born: John Keith Wozniak; January 19, 1971 (age 55); Minneapolis, Minnesota, United States
- Genres: Alternative rock; grunge; folk rock; indie rock; pop rock; psychedelic rock
- Occupations: Musician; singer; songwriter
- Instruments: Vocals; guitar
- Years active: 1990–current
- Labels: Capitol; Reality Entertainment; Deep South Entertainment
- Member of: Marcy Playground, Zog BogBean

John Keith Wozniak (born January 19, 1971) is an American musician best known as the lead singer, guitarist and songwriter of the band Marcy Playground.

== Early life ==
Wozniak was born and raised in Minneapolis. He learned how to play the guitar at the age of 14.

== Career ==
Wozniak's first solo effort was Zog BogBean – From the Marcy Playground recorded in his own home in 1990. In 1996 he recorded his second solo album, Leaving Wonderland...in a fit of rage (Produced by Jeff Dawson) and while searching for a label to release it on, decided to call it a Marcy Playground album and include new songs recorded with the rest of the band.

Aside from influences such as Neil Young, Paul Simon, and Van Morrison, an early influence in his life was his high school girlfriend from tenth grade until his freshman year in college, Sherry Fraser, of the band Two Ton Boa. She collaborated with Wozniak on Zog Bogbean, and on the song "Ancient Walls of Flowers" from Marcy Playground's self-titled album. The song "Sherry Fraser" was written about her.

Wozniak moved to Great Neck, Long Island, New York, in 1994 in order to collaborate with Jared Kotler, a multi-instrumentalist/music producer. Wozniak had written two albums worth of material and began recording what would become the eponymous Marcy Playground recordings at Sabella Recording Studio in Roslyn Heights, New York. More recording sessions followed with hiring Dylan Keefe as the band's bass player. Over two albums of material were recorded at Sebella by engineer Ken Goia, and these recordings brought the band to the attention of Capitol Records. The band was soon signed to Capitol and began a year-long series of club dates in New York City performing live in support of Marcy Playground. The band then began a radio promotion tour of the U.S. following the release of the first single "Poppies".

Follow-up single "Sex and Candy" was released shortly afterward. This song became very popular, rising to a then-record 15 weeks at number one on the U.S. Modern Rock Tracks chart. In 2012, "Sex and Candy" was named the fourth-best one-hit wonder of the 1990s by Rolling Stone. "Sex and Candy" has been covered by Maroon 5, Prozak, Slothrust, and others.

Wozniak continues to regularly write, record and tour with Marcy Playground.

== Other collaborations ==
- In 2003, Wozniak helped produce Canadian rock band Stabilo's second album, recorded at John's studio, Mushroom Studios.
- Later that year, Wozniak would work with Jimi Haha of the band Jimmie's Chicken Shack to write the song "Paper Dolls". The song appeared on both bands' albums in 2004.
- In 2006, Wozniak teamed up with Canadian musician Daniel Powter ("Bad Day") amongst other musicians to add new content to Leaving Wonderland...in a Fit of Rage, the solo album turned Marcy Playground album.
