= Unimagined Bridges =

Studio album by Driver Friendly
- Released: July 15, 2014
- Recorded: Marigolds + Monsters Studio, Atlanta, Georgia; Rattle Rock Studios, Canyon Lake, Texas
- Genres: Indie rock, pop-rock
- Length: 34:28
- Label: Hopeless
- Producer: Matt Malpass

Driver Friendly chronology
Bury a Dream (2012)	Unimagined Bridges (2014)

Singles from Unimagined Bridges
- 1. "Stand So Tall" Released: May 19, 2014; 2. "Everything Gold" Released: June 6, 2014

Unimagined Bridges is the fourth studio album by rock band Driver Friendly, released by Hopeless on July 15, 2014. The album was produced by Matt Malpass at Marigolds + Monsters Studio in Atlanta, Georgia with additional recording taking place at Rattle Rock Studios in Canyon Lake, Texas. "Stand So Tall" and "Everything Gold" was released as singles before the album was released; the former featuring Dan "Soupy" Campbell on guest vocals. To support the album, the band toured with Quiet Company, Stickup Kid, Transit, Motion City Soundtrack and Cartel, among others.

The album charted in the U.S. at number 33 on the Billboard Heatseekers chart.

== Background and recording ==
After releasing Chase the White Whale in 2008, Driver Friendly stopped making music; vocalist/keyboardist Tyler Welsh stated "it wasn't official, but we were essentially not a band". In 2011, the group realized that change was needed, they went to a cabin in North Carolina to write what would become Bury a Dream. To cover the costs of recording it, the band set up a Kickstarter campaign. It was produced by the band's longtime producer, Jim Vollentine. Eventually, the band self-released Bury a Dream in April 2012. In October, it was announced Driver Friendly had signed to Hopeless. The band released the EP, Peaks + Valleys in June 2013 and went on the 2013 edition of Warped Tour in July. Following this, in November, the band acted as a support act for a Relient K and Motion City Soundtrack co-headlining tour in the U.S. The band went on a brief tour of Texas with Wild Party in January and February 2014.

The writing and recording process for Unimagined Bridges lasted over a year and a half. The band had written over 35 songs. Unimagined Bridges was recorded at Marigolds + Monsters Studio, in Atlanta, Georgia with producer Matt Malpass. On February 18, it was announced that the band had finished recording. Malpass mixed the album, with help from assistant engineer Justin Holtsclaw. Ethan Kaufmann provided additional vocal production. The album was mastered by Michael Fossenkemper. Additional recording was done by trumpet player Juan Lopez at Rattle Rock Studios, located in Canyon Lake, Texas.

== Composition ==
Driver Friendly wanted the album to convey a story through its lyrics. The band came up with the lyrics first then wrote the music. All the music and lyrics was credited to Andy Lane, Juan Lopez, Jeremi Mattern, Chris Walker, Tyler Welsh, Andy Rector and Nathan Parrish. Malpass provided additional composition. The concept of the album is the idea of finishing an imaginary bridge, which comes from a poem by poet Rainer Maria Rilke. Welsh said the idea was "...how you become that person you want to be, what do you want for yourself in the future, how do you learn to be that better person that you think you can be and what's it like taking that journey on that road."

The bridge for "Stand So Tall" featured notes that were too high for Welsh to sing, thus the band got Dan "Soupy" Campbell to sing that part. Campbell recorded the part in one day. (Note: Driver Friendly met Campbell at Warped Tour and he said that if the group needed anything, all they had to do was ask.)

== Release ==
On May 19, 2014 Unimagined Bridges was announced, and a music video for "Stand So Tall" was released. (Note: Every pre-order included a download of Bury a Dream.) The music video was filmed by the band at an American Legion Post in Austin, Texas. "Stand So Tall" was also released as a single on the same day. Driver Friendly went on tour in the U.S. with Quiet Company and Kickback from late May to mid June. "Everything Gold" was released as a single on June 6. On July 4, "Twenty Centuries of Sleep" was available for streaming. Unimagined Bridges was available for streaming on July 8, and was released by Hopeless on July 15. (Note: U.S. Hopeless HR799-2)

The band was a support act on Stickup Kid and Seaway's Summer 2014 tour from early July to late August. On October 2, a music video was released for "Everything Gold". In October, the band supported Transit and Such Gold, and then went on a co-headlining tour with Light Years, in November. In February 2015, the band supported Motion City Soundtrack on their anniversary tour for Commit This to Memory, and then in April and May, supporting Cartel on their anniversary tour for Chroma. On June 26, the music video for "Deconstruct You" was released. The video features The Prancing Elites.

== Reception ==
The album charted in the U.S. at number 33 on the Billboard Heatseekers chart. Reviewing the album for AbsolutePunk, Ryan Gardner said the album took each members talents and built upon them. Gardner noted that despite the majority of the album being pop-rock, "it's not all upbeat all the time". The band's growth as songwriters shows during the songs' changing tempos. Gardner also mentioned that the musicianship beats the band's prior material and that it is "an album of acceptance". Allmusic reviewer Timothy Monger wrote that the songs on the album were "anthemic, infectious" and uplifting. Monger noted that the use of horns were "a nice touch" and added to the atmosphere of "The Game (This Won't Hurt)" and "The Conversation". Overall, he said it was a "solidly written" group of songs that are "dynamic and distinctive [in] sound".

Writing for Alternative Press, Greg Pratt called the album a "totally odd combination" of indie rock and horns. Pratt named "Deconstruct You" and "Undone" as good examples of the band's songwriting and ability to use the horns "in a way that is totally unexpected yet works so well". Pratt felt there was a constant "feeling" the group haven't reached "their full potential yet". Jessica Bridgeman, reviewing for Kerrang!, called the album "so effortlessly sweet that is stimulates all the same senses as their Hopeless Records labelmates." She said "Stand So Tall" was "laden with hooks so big they might snag something." The choruses of "Everything Gold" and "What a Predicament!" were "cushioned with trumpets, finger=snap sections and well-timed 'ey-oh's."

== Track listing ==
All music and lyrics written by Andy Lane, Juan Lopez, Jeremi Mattern, Chris Walker, Tyler Welsh, Andy Rector and Nathan Parrish. Additional composition by Matt Malpass.

Side A

1. "The Game (This Won't Hurt)" – 1:49
2. "Everything Gold" – 3:15
3. "Stand So Tall" (feat. Dan Campbell) – 3:11
4. "Deconstruct You" – 3:16
5. "Undone" – 3:22

Side B

6. "The Conversation" – 2:30
7. "Bad Way" – 3:23
8. "Start Again" – 3:10
9. "What a Predicament!" – 3:00
10. "Twenty Centuries of Sleep" – 3:34
11. "Bridges" – 3:53

== Personnel ==
Personnel per sleeve.

Driver Friendly

- Jeremi Mattern – drums
- Andy Lane – vocals, guitar
- Tyler Welsh – vocals, keyboards
- Juan Lopez – trumpet, backing vocals
- Chris Walker – bass, guitar, keyboards, backing vocals

Production

- Matt Malpass – producer, recording, mixing
- Justin Holtsclaw – assistant engineer
- Ethan Kaufmann – additional vocal production
- Juan Lopez – additional recording
- Dan "Soupy" Campbell – additional vocals on "Stand So Tall"
- Analee Paz – cover art design
- Jeremi Mattern – photographs, layout
- Michael Fossenkemper – mastering
