= Remember the Name (disambiguation) =

"Remember the Name" is a song by Fort Minor

Remember the Name may also refer to:

== Music ==
- "Remember the Name" (Ed Sheeran song)
- "Remember the Name", a song by the Struts from Pretty Vicious
- "Remember the Name", a song by Swollen Member from Heavy
- "Remember the Name", a song by Deadly Venoms
- "Remember the Name", a song by Ms Banks
- "Remember the Name", a song by Outsider
- Remember the Name, an album by Pay Money to My Pain
- Remember the Name, an album by SaulPaul
- Remember the Name, an EP by Koito

== Other uses ==
- Remember the Name, nickname for Belal Muhammad
