= Gifts from the Holy Ghost =

Studio album by Dorothy
- Released: April 22, 2022
- Genre: Hard rock; country rock; Christian rock
- Length: 36:56
- Label: Roc Nation
- Producer: Joel Hamilton; Ethan Kaufmann; Chris Lord-Alge; Trev Lukather; Scott Stevens

Dorothy chronology
28 Days in the Valley (2018)	Gifts from the Holy Ghost (2022)	The Way (2025)

Singles from Dorothy
- 1. "Rest in Peace" Released: January 27, 2022; 2. "Black Sheep" Released: March 24, 2022

Gifts from the Holy Ghost is the third studio album by American rock band Dorothy, released on April 22, 2022 by Roc Nation. The album was preceded by the singles "Rest in Peace" and "Black Sheep".

== Background ==
The album was inspired by an incident in which a member of Dorothy's staff nearly died from a drug overdose but recovered after singer Dorothy Martin prayed for his survival. Martin's recent sobriety is another influence on the album. Most of the album's lyrics are about spirituality and healing, despite its "swaggering" hard rock and classic rock sounds.

== Critical reception ==
The album received mixed to positive reviews from the rock music press. Kerrang! praised Martin's powerful vocals, but found the album's lyrics and hard rock attitude to be somewhat limited. Reviewer Carl Fisher noted a disconnect between the lyrics about spiritual reawakening and the party-like hard rock sounds. Ghost Cult noted that the album contains few surprises, though it features a more stripped-down sound than the band's previous albums and remains an enjoyable listing experience.

The Spill Magazine noted some occasional genre experiments like country rock while also praising Martin's vocals. Riff Magazine noted that the album mixes the "bombastic urgency" and "earnest classic rock" of Dorothy's previous albums, and described the album as "a triumphant battle cry and a return to form." Distorted Sound concluded that the album "has an infectious energy that will make you want to get up and dance." Cryptic Rock concluded that "Martin and her tight band of rockers have put together their most mature and well-written albums [sic] to date." The Soundboard concluded that the album cements Dorothy's status as one of the most accomplished among a recent spate of retro-rock bands.

== Track listing ==
Gifts from the Holy Ghost track listing
No.	Title	Writer(s)	Producer(s)	Length
1.	"A Beautiful Life"	Dorothy Martin; Jason Hook	Chris Lord-Alge	3:36
2.	"Big Guns"	Martin; Chris Traynor; Grace Mitchell; Joel Hamilton; Kyle Hoffman	Lord-Alge	3:32
3.	"Rest in Peace"	Martin; Scott Stevens; Zac Maloy	Stevens	3:37
4.	"Top of the World"	Martin; Trevor Lukather	Ethan Kaufmann; Lukather	4:04
5.	"Hurricane"	Martin; Lukather	Kaufmann; Lukather	3:17
6.	"Close to Me Always"	Audra Mae; Raoul Chen; Malloy	Lord-Alge	3:55
7.	"Black Sheep"	Martin; Blair Daly; Stevens; Maloy	Stevens	3:10
8.	"Touched by Fire"	Martin; Lukather	Kaufmann; Lukather	3:43
9.	"Made to Die"	Martin; Keith Wallen	Hamilton	3:43
10.	"Gifts from the Holy Ghost"	Martin; Eli Wulfmeier; Eliot Lorango; Jason Ganberg; Owen Barry	Lord-Alge	4:19
Total length:				36:56

== Personnel ==
=== Dorothy ===
- Dorothy Martin – vocals
- Devon Pangle – guitar
- Eli Wulfmeier – guitar
- Eliot Lorango – bass
- Jason Ganberg – drums

=== Additional musicians ===
- Chris Lord-Alge – additional vocals, keyboards, percussion (tracks 1, 2, 6, 10)
- Phil X – additional vocals, guitar (tracks 1, 2, 6, 10); bass (1, 2, 10)
- Brian Tichy – drums (tracks 1, 2, 6, 10)
- Scott Stevens – bass, guitar (tracks 3, 7), percussion (3), programming (3), keyboards (7)
- Evan Frederiksen – drums (tracks 3, 7), drum programming (3)
- Marti Frederiksen – drum programming (tracks 3, 7)
- Blair Daly – additional vocals (track 3)
- Zac Maloy – additional vocals (track 3)
- Trev Lukather – background vocals, bass, guitar, percussion, synthesizer (tracks 4, 5, 8); vocals (5, 8)
- Jake Hayden – drums (tracks 4, 5, 8), vocals (8)
- Ethan Kaufmann – percussion (tracks 4, 5, 8), vocals (5)
- Kim Bullard – keyboards, programming (track 6)
- Joel Hamilton – guitar, percussion, synthesizer (track 9)
- Connie Petruk – additional vocals (track 9)

=== Technical ===
- Ted Jensen – mastering
- Chris Lord-Alge – mixing (tracks 1–6, 8–10), engineering (1, 2, 4–6, 8–10)
- Scott Stevens – mixing (track 7), engineering (3, 7)
- Adam Chagnon – additional engineering (tracks 1–6, 8–10)
- Chris Baseford – additional mixing (track 7)
- Joel Hamilton – additional engineering (track 2)
- Brian Judd – mixing assistance (tracks 1–6, 8–10)
