= Rock Is Dead =

Rock Is Dead, or Rock and Roll Is Dead, or similar may also refer to:

== Music ==
=== Albums ===
- Rock Is Dead—Long Live Rock!, an unreleased 1972 album by The Who
- Rockisdead, a 2016 album by Dorothy
- Rock & Roll Is Dead, a 2005 album by The Hellacopters

=== Songs ===
- "Rock Is Dead" (The Doors song), 1969
- "Rock Is Dead" (Marilyn Manson song), 1998
  - Rock Is Dead Tour, a 1999 concert tour by Marilyn Manson
- "Rock and Roll Is Dead", a 1995 song by Lenny Kravitz
