= Record Heat =

American band

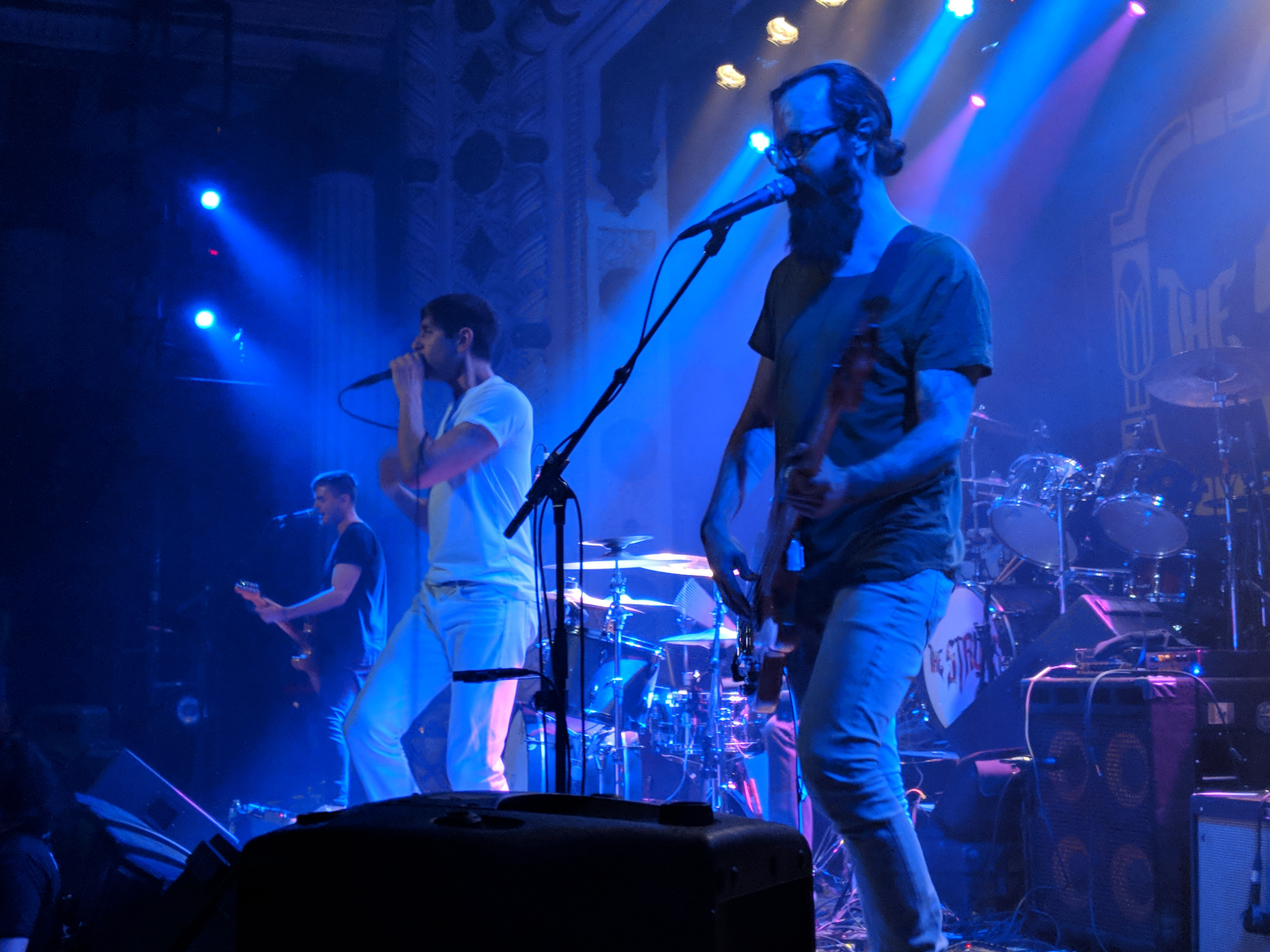
- Spirit Animal at the Metro Chicago on 5/9/18

Background information
- Also known as: Spirit Animal
- Origin: New York City
- Genres: Rock, pop, funk
- Years active: 2010–present
- Labels: Swagger State University, RED Music
- Members: Steve Cooper; Cal Stamp; Paul Michel

Record Heat, previously known as Spirit Animal, is an American band from Brooklyn, New York City. The band consists of Steve Cooper (vocals), Cal Stamp (lead guitar), and Paul Michel (bass). In August 2020 the band officially changed their name to Record Heat.

== History ==
Steve Cooper originally performed as a solo artist under the stage name The Gray Kid. When forming Spirit Animal, the band consisted of Steve Cooper and Computer Jay, plus other musicians including Jesse Ingalls and Jordan Richardson (both from Ben Harper's Relentless7). The band would release their first studio album The Cost of Living in 2010, and used a Kickstarter campaign to fund the following tour, where Steve Cooper offered to cook dinner for fans in exchange for tour support. However, Cooper does not consider the band to have truly started until 2012, when the current lineup was solidified. Lead singer Steve Cooper and bassist Paul Michel originally met in 2002 in Washington, D.C. Guitarist Cal Stamp was introduced to the band by a mutual friend, but initially turned down the guitarist role. However, after seeing a Spirit Animal set in Manhattan, he changed his mind and joined the band.

Spirit Animal released its first EP This Is A Test in 2012. In 2013, Sean Parker added Spirit Animal's song, "The Black Jack White" to a Spotify playlist, which led to over 450,000 plays of the song. The song was later featured in an episode of CSI:NY. In 2014, Cooper wrote an article for Business Insider about Taylor Swift's removal of her music from Spotify. In 2016, Spirit Animal partnered with the website Bloody Disgusting for the music video for the song, "Big Bad Road Dog" from their EP, World War IV.

The band signed a record deal with Atlantic Records in May 2018, and released a new single titled, "YEAH!". They were formerly signed to Wind-up Records. In the first part of 2018, the band opened for The Struts, Incubus, and Fitz and the Tantrums. Spirit Animal released their major label debut album, Born Yesterday, on August 3, 2018. The second single from the album, "Karma," was written in the rehearsal space of Tenacious D. In 2019, the band left Atlantic Records, and created their own label, Swagger State University, an imprint of RED Music. The band released REBORN YESTERDAY, which includes all tracks from Born Yesterday, plus two new tracks "HYDR8", "Arm Candy," and an acoustic version of "YEAH!".

The band toured with Theory of a Deadman in summer 2018, and toured with The Struts and White Reaper in the fall. After touring with the Struts, Spirit Animal toured with Red Sun Rising and dubé. In early 2019, Spirit Animal opened for Dorothy. In spring 2019, they performed at WIXO's Spring Fling festival in Peoria, and opened for Stone Temple Pilots at the Detroit Grand Prix. Spirit Animal began opening for Theory of a Deadman in fall 2019, and will tour with The Cult in December 2019. The tour is celebrating the 30th anniversary of The Cult's album Sonic Temple; Spirit Animal will be opening for the United States leg of the tour. Ricky Reed helped produce REBORN YESTERDAY.

Spirit Animal has been compared to Talking Heads, The Black Keys, Faith No More, and Red Hot Chili Peppers. Fans of Spirit Animal refer to themselves as "Spanimals".

== Discography ==
=== Studio albums ===
- The Cost of Living (2010)
- Born Yesterday (2018)
- REBORN YESTERDAY (2019)

=== EPs ===
- This Is a Test (2012)
- Kingdom Phylum (2013)
- World War IV (2016)
