= The Struts =

British glam rock band

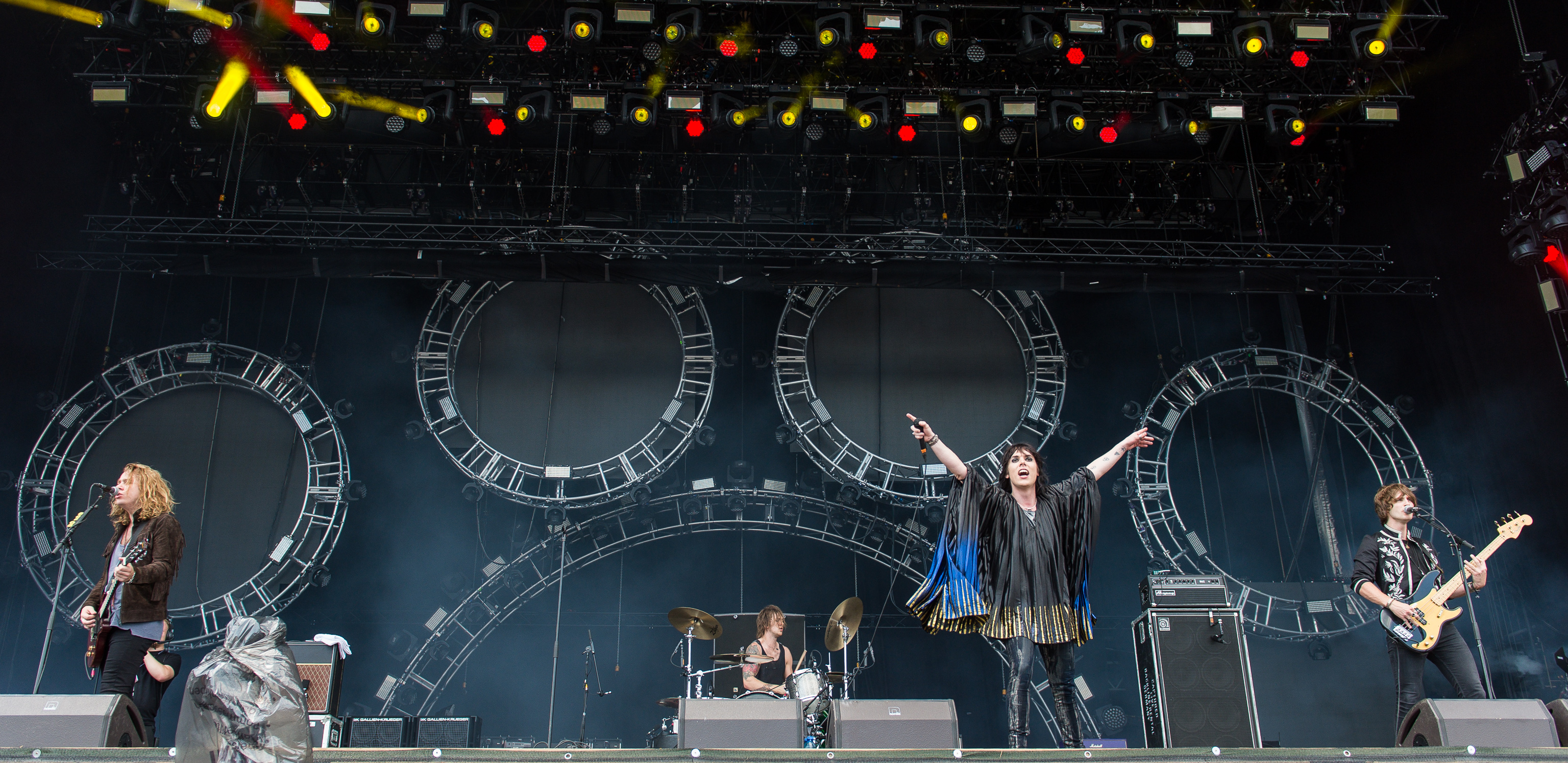
- The Struts performing at Rock im Park in 2016

Background information
- Origin: Derby, Derbyshire, England
- Genres: Glam rock; hard rock
- Years active: 2012–present
- Labels: Interscope; Polydor; Virgin; EMI; Big Machine
- Members: Luke Spiller; Adam Slack; Jed Elliott; Gethin Davies
- Past members: Jamie Binns; Rafe Thomas
- Website: thestruts.com

The Struts are a British glam rock band from Derby, Derbyshire, formed in 2012. The band is currently composed of lead singer Luke Spiller, guitarist Adam Slack, bassist Jed Elliott, and drummer Gethin Davies.

The band have released four studio albums, two EPs and two live albums.

== History ==
=== Formation and early years (2012–2014) ===
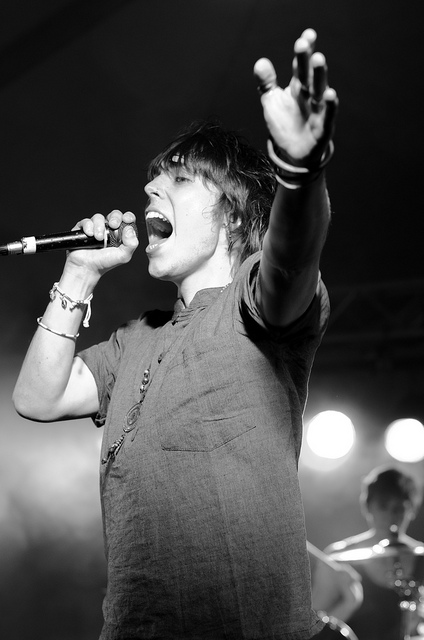
Luke Spiller performing in 2012

Singer-songwriter Luke Spiller was raised in Bristol in a Christian family. His exposure to music was mainly limited to gospel music, until the age of seven, when he discovered Michael Jackson's Off the Wall. Inspired by Jackson, his first aspirations were to be a contemporary dancer, but by the age of 11, he was listening to Led Zeppelin, Queen, AC/DC, and Leonard Cohen, and in addition to pretending to be Jackson in front of a mirror, he was imitating Bon Scott and Freddie Mercury. He began playing in bands as a teenager, only starting to sing at age 16.

In 2009, Spiller, then living in Clevedon, met Derby-based guitarist/songwriter Adam Slack, who had also been playing with bands since his teens. At the time, each of their bands were "coming apart," and Slack and Spiller quickly connected musically. Spiller moved to Derby, where he and Slack lived, wrote, and recorded together for nearly three years. They recruited mutual friends Jamie Binns and Rafe Thomas to play bass and drums. In 2012, Binns and Thomas were replaced with bassist Jed Elliott and drummer Gethin Davies, forming the Struts.

The band chose the name the Struts based on an offhand comment made at a rehearsal. Spiller said in a 2015 interview, "I was just moving around and somebody was like, 'you strut around a lot.' From then on, we knew we had a great name. We couldn't believe it hadn't been taken."

The band played frequently throughout the UK. They soon developed a following and released their first single, "I Just Know", in June 2012. Signed by Future Records, they were transferred to Virgin EMI after Future's demise and subsequently put out a four-track EP titled Kiss This, which includes a cover of "Royals" by Lorde.

The Struts toured extensively in England and France, and in 2014 performed for 80,000 people as the opener for the Rolling Stones in Paris. That summer, they did a 24-date tour, which included a gig at the Isle of Wight Festival. Spiller wore clothing designed for him by Zandra Rhodes, who formerly dressed Freddie Mercury. The production of Rhodes' clothing for Spiller was later featured on the BBC documentary Oh You Pretty Things: The Story of Music and Fashion.

As the Struts reputation as a live band grew, their audience increased, and their shows were frequently sold-out. Spiller's talent as a frontman was often noted by the press and reviews described him as "a force of nature" and as a "physical, mesmerising entertainer... vocally strong, expressive and blessed with excellent range". Spiller's looks and stage presence led Roger Goodgroves of Get To the Front to describe him as "the musical love child of Freddie Mercury and Mick Jagger".

Mike Oldfield recruited Spiller to sing on his 2014 album Man on the Rocks. He ended up singing the whole album main vocals instead of just one song, as planned by Mike. "He did a much better job of sounding like a rock star than me," Oldfield said.

The Struts first television performance was on Vintage TV's 'Live Sessions,' where they appeared alongside established acts including Toyah, Nik Kershaw and Judie Tzuke. The show was recorded in January 2014 at the Bedford in Balham and aired on 20 March. The band played two tracks, 'Kiss This' and 'Could Have Been Me'.

=== Everybody Wants (2014–2017) ===
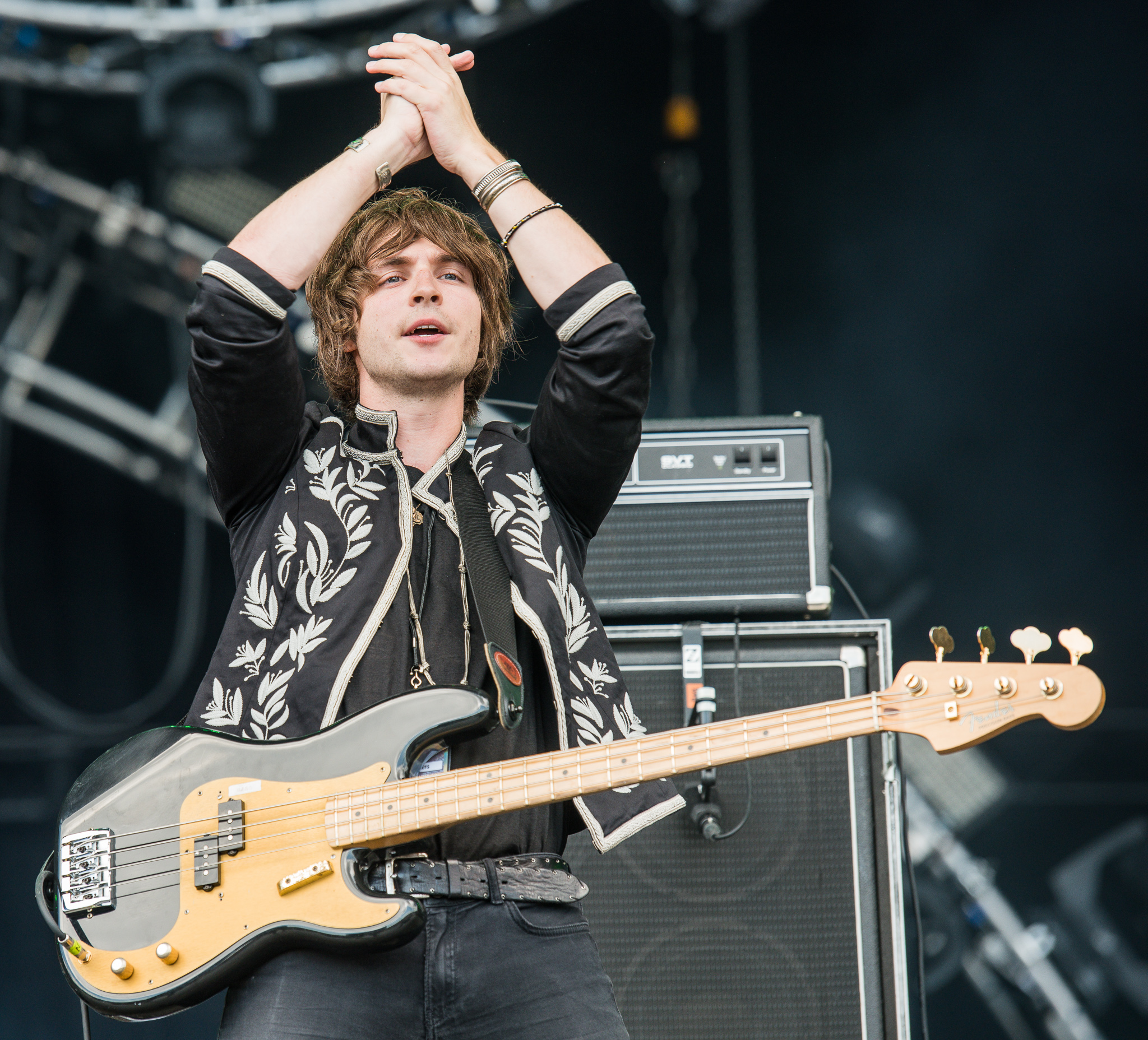
Jed Elliott at Rock im Park 2016

Everybody Wants, their debut studio album, released in July 2014 in the UK. It charted in the UK and received positive reviews. In early 2015, The Struts signed to Interscope Records/Polydor and in August of that year they released the EP Have You Heard, their first U.S. release. They began a tour of the States in support of the record in September. Twenty dates were sold out, including the band's Los Angeles debut at the Troubador, which sold out in 30 minutes. "Could Have Been Me", the lead single, hit No. 1 on the Spotify Viral Top 50, No. 4 on the iTunes rock singles chart, and in the Top 5 on the U.S. alternative and active rock charts, and was also the official theme song of the WWE's NXT brand's 2015 pay-per-view NXT Takeover: London. The video for the track, directed by Jonas Åkerlund, had more than 1.5 million views within two months of its Vevo debut.

The Struts relocated to Los Angeles in early 2015. Their first television appearance in America was on Jimmy Kimmel Live! in August 2015, and in September they were named "Band on the Verge" by USA Today. In December 2015 they performed on Late Night with Seth Meyers. In January 2016, it was announced that the Struts would release a reissue of Everybody Wants on 4 March on Freesolo/Interscope Records/Universal Music Canada with five songs not included on the original UK release.

On 9 August 2016, they opened for the band Guns N' Roses for their "Not in This Lifetime" tour at Oracle Park in San Francisco, where they debuted their new single "Put Your Hands Up". On 3 March 2017, the band released Live And Unplugged, a 5-song acoustic EP that includes a cover of "Hotline Bling". In July 2017, they opened for the band The Who in Quebec City, playing for over 80 000 people. On 23 September 2017, the Struts opened for the Rolling Stones during the #nofilter tour in Lucca, Italy. On 12 October 2017, the Struts opened for the Foo Fighters at the Washington DC opening of The Anthem as part of the North American leg of the Foo Fighters' Concrete and Gold Tour.

=== Young & Dangerous, Touring with Foo Fighters and Body Talks Tour (2018–2019) ===
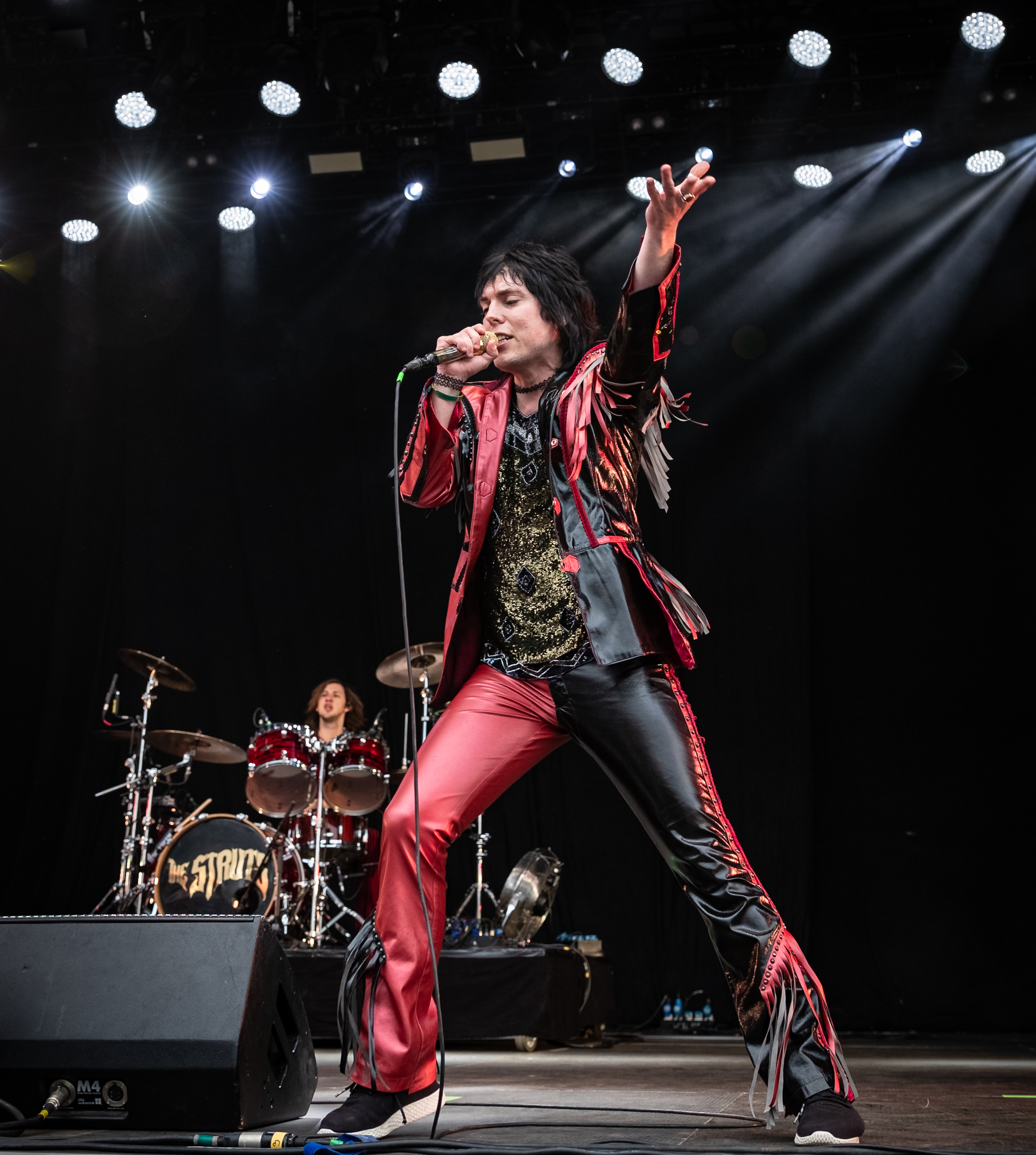
Luke Spiller at Rock am Ring 2019

In June 2018, the band announced it had finished recording its second album, which was in the final mixing stages. Luke Spiller said, "I think everyone's really going to enjoy it. We were very much aware that even though the band has lived with the first album and the songs that come with it for quite a while, for everyone else, it's relatively fresh. So I felt like it was really important to make this second album somewhat depart from the first one. Not a departure musically, I didn't want to go completely left. I think it's important to give people more of what they fall in love with." After wrapping up their tour with Foo Fighters, The Struts headlined their Body Talks tour, with bands Spirit Animal and White Reaper. The band also collaborated with American singer and songwriter Kesha for the remix of their single "Body Talks". The Struts premiered the single "Bulletproof Baby" in September, and released their second album Young & Dangerous on 26 October 2018.

=== Strange Days and Pretty Vicious (2020–present) ===
On 28 August 2020, the Struts released the single "Another Hit of Showmanship" with The Strokes guitarist Albert Hammond Jr. They subsequently announced a new album titled Strange Days. The single and title track with Robbie Williams was released on 2 September 2020, with the music video releasing on the 9th, and the album followed on 16 October 2020. "Another Hit of Showmanship" was also a song on the album.

On 16 April 2021, the Struts released a non-album single called "Low Key in Love" which featured Paris Jackson. Another non-album single was released on 19 August 2022, titled "Fallin' with Me".

On 11 July 2023, the Struts released a new single called "Too Good at Raising Hell" complete with a music video uploaded onto YouTube, ahead of their previously unannounced fourth studio album. On 10 August 2023, The Struts revealed the album was titled Pretty Vicious and would release on 3 November 2023.

On May 9, 2026, the Struts announced via their official Instagram account that they had begun work on their fifth studio album.

== Musical style and influences ==
The Struts play a modern-day take on glam rock. Their musical style combines alternative rock, arena rock, glam metal, hard rock and power pop, with the aesthetics of the Sunset Strip pop metal scene. AllMusic characterized the band's first two albums as "neo-glam pop", but Everybody Wants is closer to pop-punk, while Young & Dangerous adds elements of contemporary pop and dance music.

The band has cited its influences as: Queen, The Darkness, The Rolling Stones, Aerosmith, Def Leppard, The Killers, The Smiths, Oasis, the Libertines, Michael Jackson, The Strokes, The Vaccines and My Chemical Romance.

== Discography ==
=== Studio albums ===
Title	Album details	Peak chart positions				
Title	Album details	UK	CAN	SCO	US	US Rock
Everybody Wants	Released: 28 July 2014; Label: Virgin EMI; Format: CD, digital download, vinyl	52	68	—	99	15
Young & Dangerous	Released: 26 October 2018; Label: Interscope Geffen A&M; Format: CD, digital download, vinyl	77	—	44	102	13
Strange Days	Released: 16 October 2020; Label: Interscope; Format: CD, digital download, cassette	11	—	12	— (Note: Strange Days did not enter the US Billboard 200, but peaked at number 24 on the US Album Sales Chart.)	—
Pretty Vicious	Released: 3 November 2023; Label: Big Machine Records; Format: CD, digital download, vinyl	—	—	26	—	—

=== EPs ===
Title	EP details	Chart positions	Sales
Title	EP details	US Heat	Sales
Kiss This EP	Released: 7 April 2014; Label: Virgin EMI; Format: Digital download	—	
Have You Heard...	Released: 14 August 2015; Label: Interscope; Format: Digital download	9	US: 14,000
"—" denotes releases that did not chart

=== Live releases ===
Title	EP details
Live and Unplugged	Released: 3 March 2017; Label: Interscope; Format: Digital download
Unplugged at EastWest	Released: 24 February 2023; Label: Big Machine Group; Format: Digital download
"—" denotes releases that did not chart

=== Singles ===
List of singles, showing year released and album name
Title	Year	Peak chart positions									Certifications	Album
Title	Year	UK Down.	CAN Digital	CAN Rock	CZ Rock	JPN Over.	SCO	US Alt.	US Main. Rock	US Rock.	Certifications	Album
"I Just Know"	2012	—	—	—	—	—	—	—	—	—		Non-album single
"Could Have Been Me"	2013	—	—	2	—	—	—	5	12	15	BPI: Silver; RIAA: Platinum	Everybody Wants
"Kiss This"	2014	—	—	2	—	18	—	8	17	21		Everybody Wants
"Put Your Money on Me"	2014	—	—	36	—	—	—	22	—	— (Note: "Put Your Money on Me" did not enter the Hot Rock Songs chart, but peaked at number 37 on the Rock Airplay chart.)		Everybody Wants
"Put Your Hands Up"	2016	—	—	—	—	—	—	—	—	—		Everybody Wants (Japanese edition)
"The Ballroom Blitz" (Sweet cover)	2016	—	—	—	—	—	—	—	—	—		The Edge of Seventeen
"One Night Only"	2017	—	—	—	—	—	—	18	29	26		Young & Dangerous (Japanese edition)
"Body Talks"	2018	—	32	3	—	—	—	12	33	15		Young & Dangerous
"Primadonna Like Me"	2018	—	—	—	—	—	—	—	—	—		Young & Dangerous
"Body Talks" (with Ke$ha)	2018	—	—	—	—	—	—	—	—	—		Young & Dangerous
"Bulletproof Baby"	2018	—	—	—	—	—	—	—	—	—		Young & Dangerous
"Fire (Part 1)"	2018	—	—	—	—	—	—	—	—	—		Young & Dangerous
"21st Century Dandy"	2018	—	—	—	—	—	—	—	—	—		Young & Dangerous (Japanese edition)
"In Love With a Camera"	2019	—	—	—	—	—	—	—	—	—		Young & Dangerous
"Dancing in the Street" (Martha and the Vandellas cover, based on the Van Halen version)	2019	—	—	—	—	—	—	—	—	—		Young & Dangerous (Japanese edition)
"Pegasus Seiya" (Saint Seiya theme cover)	2019	—	—	—	—	—	—	—	—	—		Young & Dangerous (Japanese edition)
"Another Hit of Showmanship" (with Albert Hammond Jr.)	2020	—	—	—	—	—	—	40	—	—		Strange Days
"Strange Days" (with Robbie Williams)	2020	25	—	—	—	—	20	—	—	—		Strange Days
"I Hate How Much I Want You" (with Phil Collen and Joe Elliott)	2020	—	—	—	—	—	—	—	—	—		Strange Days
"Low Key in Love" (with Paris Jackson)	2021	—	—	—	—	—	—	—	—	—		Non-album singles
"We Will Rock You" (Queen cover)	2021	—	—	—	—	—	—	—	—	—		Non-album singles
"Fallin' With Me"	2022	—	—	—	—	—	—	15	35	— (Note: "Fallin' With Me" did not enter the Hot Rock Songs chart, but peaked at number 26 on the Rock Airplay chart.)		Non-album singles
"Too Good at Raising Hell"	2023	—	—	—	—	—	—	38	16	— (Note: "Too Good at Raising Hell" did not enter the Hot Rock Songs chart, but peaked at number 44 on the Rock Airplay chart.)		Pretty Vicious
"Royals" (Lorde cover)	2023	—	—	—	—	—	—	—	—	—		Non-album single
"Rockstar"	2023	—	—	—	—	—	—	—	—	—		Pretty Vicious
"Pretty Vicious"	2023	—	—	—	—	—	—	16	—	—		Pretty Vicious
"How Can I Love You? (Without Breaking Your Heart)"	2024	—	—	—	—	—	—	—	—	—		Non-album single
"Heaven's Got Nothing On You"	2024	—	—	—	9	—	—	—	—	—		Non-album single
"Can't Stop Talking"	2024	—	—	—	7	—	—	—	—	—		Non-album single
"Rock 'n' Roll Fantasy" (Bad Company cover)	2025	—	—	—	—	—	—	—	—	—		Non-album single
"Could Have Been Me" (with Brian May)	2025	—	—	—	—	—	—	—	—	—		Non-album single
"—" denotes a recording that did not chart or was not released in that territory.

=== Other charting songs ===
Title	Year	Peak chart positions	Album
Title	Year	CZ Rock	Album
"Roll Up"	2014	5	Everybody Wants

=== Music videos ===
List of music videos, showing year released and director
Year	Title	Director
2012	"I Just Know" (version 1)	Unknown
2013	"I Just Know" (version 2)	Rhys Frampton
2014	"Kiss This" (version 1)	Ed Hobson
2014	"Matter of Time"	Unknown
2014	"Put Your Money On Me"	Rhys Frampton
2015	"Could Have Been Me"	Jonas Åkerlund
2016	"Kiss This" (version 2)	Greg Watermann
2017	"One Night Only"	Ryan Hunter Phillips
2018	"Body Talks"	Greg Watermann
2018	"Body Talks" (ft. Kesha)	Lagan Sebert
2018	"Primadonna Like Me"	Greg Watermann
2019	"Dancing In the Streets"	Sebastian Savino
2019	"I Do It So Well"	Bryson Roatch
2019	"Tatler Magazine"	Bryson Roatch
2019	"Somebody New"	Bryson Roatch
2019	"Inside Your Mind"	Bryson Roatch
2020	"Strange Days" (with Robbie Williams)	Chris Applebaum
2021	"Low Key in Love" (with Paris Jackson)	Unknown
2022	"Fallin' With Me"	Unknown
2023	"Too Good at Raising Hell"	Unknown
2024	"Can't Stop Talking"	Unknown
