= Body Talks =

2018 single by The Struts

Single by the Struts

from the album Young & Dangerous
- Released: 15 June 2018
- Genre: Glam punk
- Length: 2:58
- Label: Interscope
- Songwriters: Lauren Christy; Jon Levine; Adam Slack; Luke Spiller
- Producers: Christy; Levine

The Struts singles chronology
| "One Night Only" (2017) | "Body Talks" (2018) | "Primadonna Like Me" (2018) |

Music video
- "Body Talks" on YouTube

"Body Talks"

Single by the Struts featuring Kesha

from the album Young & Dangerous
- Released: 29 June 2018
- Genre: Glam rock; dance-rock
- Length: 2:58
- Label: Interscope
- Songwriters: Lauren Christy; Jon Levine; Adam Slack; Luke Spiller
- Producers: Christy; Levine

The Struts singles chronology
| "Primadonna Like Me" (2018) | "Body Talks" (2018) | "Bulletproof Baby" (2018) |

Kesha singles chronology
| "Woman" (2018) | "Body Talks" (2018) | "Here Comes the Change" (2018) |

Music video
- "Body Talks" ft. Kesha on YouTube

"Body Talks" is a song by English glam rock band the Struts. It was released as the first single from their second studio album, Young & Dangerous. It was originally released on 15 June 2018 as the lead single from their album and was later re-released as a duet with American singer-songwriter Kesha on 29 June. Both the solo and duet versions are included as the first and thirteenth track respectively on the Struts' album. The song was written by band members Luke Spiller and Adam Slack with producers Lauren Christy and John Levine.

== Background ==
Lead singer, Luke Spiller discussed the background of the song in an interview on the Elvis Duran Show: "[Kesha] is a real rock and roller at heart really. When you talk to her about her music and stuff, she loves the Stones. She loves a lot of great British bands. So I think we naturally connected and she heard the song and that was it really."

Kesha also talked about the Struts and the song in a statement to Rolling Stone."They are one of my favorite current bands keeping the spirit of classic rock and roll alive with their wild energy and sexy style. It’s a song about my favorite activity: boogieing."

== Music video ==
The music video for the Kesha duet was released on 28 August 2018. The video features the band playing the song while Spiller dances around a red backdrop with a cane and Kesha sits on a gold throne, shouting through a megaphone. The duo utilize a number of randomly painted props, including bananas, pyramids, roosters, cherries, skulls, ice cream cones and lollipops. The music video for the non-duet version features the band in London on tour.

== Commercial performance ==
The solo version of the song peaked at No. 12 on the Billboard US Alternative, #33 on Billboard US Mainstream Rock and #15 on the Billboard Hot Rock Songs.

== Live performances ==
The Struts and Kesha performed the song together for the first time on The Tonight Show Starring Jimmy Fallon on 15 November 2018.

The song was performed again together during a show in Atlantic City, New Jersey at the Ocean Resort on 16 November 2018. The song was also performed at the Victoria's Secret Fashion Show at Pier 94 New York City on 8 November 2018.

== Charts ==
=== Weekly charts ===
| Chart (2018) | Peak position |
|---|---|
| Canada Rock (Billboard) | 3 |
| Canadian Digital Song Sales (Billboard) | 32 |
| US Rock & Alternative Airplay (Billboard) | 16 |
| US Hot Rock & Alternative Songs (Billboard) | 15 |

=== Year-end charts ===
| Chart (2018) | Position |
|---|---|
| US Hot Rock Songs (Billboard) | 81 |
| Chart (2019) | Position |
| US Hot Rock Songs (Billboard) | 90 |

== Certifications ==
| Region | Certification | Certified units/sales |
|---|---|---|
| Brazil (Pro-Música Brasil) | Gold | 20,000^{‡} |
^{‡} Sales+streaming figures based on certification alone.

== Release history ==
Release history and versions for "Body Talks"
| Region | Date | Formats | Version | Label | Ref. |
|---|---|---|---|---|---|
| Italy | 29 June 2018 | Radio airplay | Kesha remix | EMI | |
