= 28 Days in the Valley =

Studio album by Dorothy
- Released: March 9, 2018
- Genres: Hard rock, psychedelic rock, blues rock
- Length: 53:12
- Label: Roc Nation
- Producer: Linda Perry

Dorothy chronology
Rockisdead (2016)	28 Days in the Valley (2018)	Gifts from the Holy Ghost (2022)

Singles from Dorothy
- 1. "Flawless" Released: January 19, 2018; 2. "Who Do You Love" Released: November 5, 2018; 3. "Freedom" Released: April 25, 2019

28 Days in the Valley is the second studio album by American rock band Dorothy, released on March 9, 2018, by Roc Nation. It includes the single "Flawless".

== Track listing ==
All tracks are written by Dorothy Martin and Linda Perry, except where noted. All songs produced by Perry.

No.	Title	Writer(s)	Length
1.	"Flawless"		4:03
2.	"Who Do You Love"		4:13
3.	"Pretty When You're High"		3:25
4.	"Mountain"		4:12
5.	"Freedom"	Dorothy Martin, Eli Wulfmeier, Nick Maybury, Eliot Lorango, Jason Ganberg	4:36
6.	"White Butterfly"		4:55
7.	"28 Days in the Valley (Interlude)"		2:12
8.	"On My Knees"		5:08
9.	"Black Tar & Nicotine"	Linda Perry	3:45
10.	"Philadelphia"	Dorothy Martin, Eli Wulfmeier, Nick Maybury, Eliot Lorango, Jason Ganberg	4:16
11.	"Ain't Our Time to Die"		4:08
12.	"We Are STAARS"		3:44
13.	"We Need Love"		4:36
Total length:			53:12
