= Dorothy (band) =

American rock band

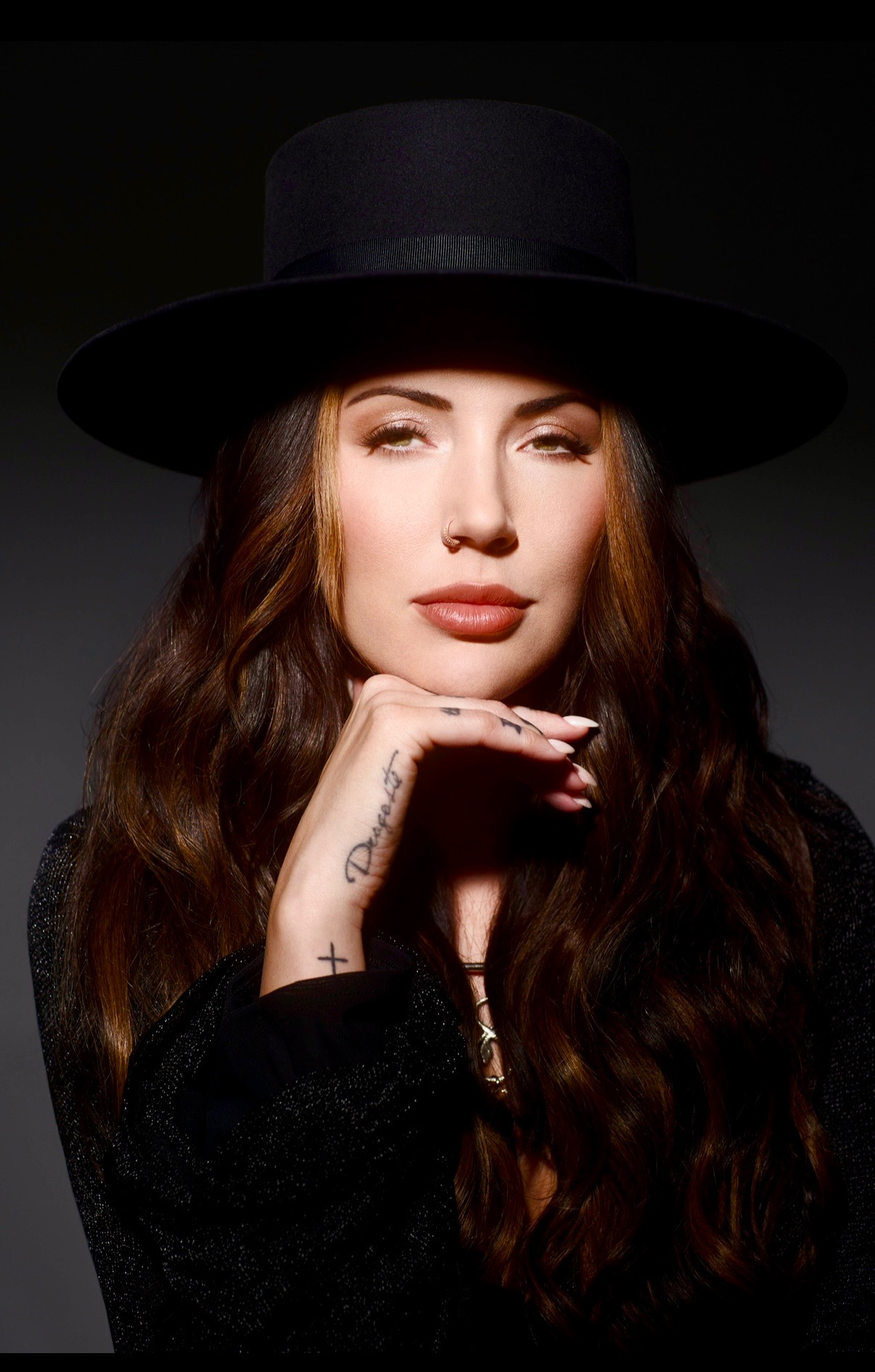
- Martin for 'The Way'

Background information
- Origin: Los Angeles, California, U.S.
- Genres: Rock; hard rock; blues rock; Cowpunk; Southern rock
- Years active: 2014–present
- Members: Dorothy Martin; Nick Perri; Eliot Lorango; Jake Hayden
- Past members: Dylan Howard; Gregg Cash; Zac Morris; Mark Jackson; Nick Maybury; Owen Barry; Jason Ganberg; Devon Pangle; Eli Wulfmeier; Sam Koltun
- Website: dorothytheband.com

Dorothy (stylized as DOROTHY) is an American rock band fronted by songwriter and vocalist Dorothy Martin. The band formed in 2014 in Los Angeles, and consists of drummer Jake Hayden, guitarist Sam Koltun, and bassist Eliot Lorango. They released their first project, a self-titled EP, in 2014. Rolling Stone deemed them "a [band] you need to know", and named Dorothy's band number 14 on their 50 Best New Artists of 2014 list.

== Career ==
=== 2013–2014: Beginnings and Dorothy EP ===
In early 2013, Dorothy Martin, a hard rock and Southern rock singer, was introduced to producer and guitarist Mark Jackson and his production partner Ian Scott by her manager, George Robertson. "When we heard Dorothy's voice, we were like, 'Wow — if we put this behind some serious old-school metal riffs, we'll have something big,'" said guitarist Mark Jackson in a November 2014 interview with Rolling Stone. "It sounded so cool when we did it, just having that fat bottom of old-school hip-hop records with metal guitars [playing] really simple riffs. [We're taking] this back to AC/DC or Sabbath—just one guitar, one bass, and drums and bad-ass vocals."

What started as a piano ballad Dorothy had played for Jackson and Scott during one of their first meetings transformed into the band's hard-hitting debut "After Midnight". On June 10, 2014, the video for "After Midnight" premiered on Vice music network Noisey, dubbed as "the perfect modern rock concoction". The live performance video was shot at Swinghouse Studios in Hollywood by George Robertson and Aris Jerome. The video featured vocalist Martin donning her trademark fur coat, vintage T-shirt, and red lips.

The song spread quickly, climbing Hype Machine's music blog charts and gaining traction locally in Los Angeles as well as overseas. Dorothy fielded early comparisons to The Kills, The White Stripes, Patti Smith, and Grace Slick. London-based fashion publication Hunger TV commented, "it feels good to know raw power, sex and whiskey is back en vogue". On July 24, 2014, Huffington Post named "After Midnight" the #1 song on their 12 Songs You Need to Know This Week, calling them "dangerous", "kick-ass", and "exactly what rock needs".

In August 2014, the band was invited by Skullcandy to perform at select cities in Europe, including Paris, Berlin, and San Sebastián. On September 12, 2014, Vogue UK debuted a video using "After Midnight" starring English model and actress Suki Waterhouse. After breaking their song on LA radio, KCRW DJ and music director Chris Douridas invited Dorothy to perform during his weekly School Night series at Bardot in Hollywood on October 6, 2014. "A packed house moved increasingly closer to the stage while Dorothy, whiskey in one hand and microphone in the other, mesmerized the crowd with her powerhouse vocals", noted LA Weekly's Pamela Chelin. "She's such a badass...like a revved up Adele teetering on the brink of chaos", said Douridas to Chelin.

On August 19, 2014, the band premiered its second single "Wild Fire" on IndieShuffle to great reviews. On October 27, 2014, Billboard premiered Dorothy's third single "Wicked Ones", comparing their bluesy, rock sound to Black Sabbath and The White Stripes. "You get a load of their easygoing cool and you're reminded that there have always been kids like them keeping rock edgy, albeit under the radar, far from mainstream attention", noted Chris Payne of Billboard. "Wicked Ones" became the band's most successful single thus far. It was the number-one trending indie rock song on SoundCloud, peaked at number four on the HypeMachine chart, and was selected by Skullcandy to lead a national ad campaign with James Harden.

On October 28, 2014, Dorothy released their debut self-titled EP, which was recorded in a spare bedroom at Scott's residence in Los Angeles. Following the release, they headlined a local residency at Bootleg Theater every Monday night in November. That month, they recorded a cover of Jay Z and Kanye West's "No Church in the Wild", and have since added it to their live performances, which have received rave reviews. Following the residency, Dorothy was named on Rolling Stone's Artists You Need to Know list on November 24, 2014. "You really get the full energy from everybody, because they put their heart and soul into the performance", Martin told Rolling Stone. "It's more loose; it's not going to be exactly like the record. There's a lot of energy and vibe." In an interview with LA Weekly, Martin spoke on the band and overcoming stage fright. "I've always just wanted to sing and it was a long journey to get over the stage fright and find who I was", she says. "If you don't get knocked down, you can't stand up and say, 'I'm ready for this now.'"

On December 30, 2014, Rolling Stone included Dorothy at number 14 on their 50 Best New Artists of 2014 list.

=== 2015–2016: Rockisdead ===
On February 23, 2015, Complex premiered the "Wicked Ones" video. On March 5, 2015, Dorothy headlined a show at The Satellite in Los Angeles before a string of SXSW performances. They followed SXSW with an April residency every Monday night at The Satellite, bringing out supporters including Miguel, Tom Morello and Australian actress and model Ruby Rose. On June 16, 2015, Dorothy announced signing a recording deal with Roc Nation. The band also announced that they would go on tour with Miguel starting July 24. The band's song "Wicked Ones" has been used in television advertisements for Levi's and Gatorade. It also served as the theme song for WWE's 2015 pay-per-view TLC.

In February 2016, "Get Up" was used in the promos for Survivor: Kaôh Rōng. On June 24, 2016, Dorothy released their debut studio album, Rockisdead.

Dorothy went on tour as an opening act for Halestorm in the spring and fall. When the tour was announced, Halestorm's lead singer Lzzy Hale was quoted as saying, "I [...] welcome newcomers Dorothy who make me so proud of the future of rock."

In August 2016, Dorothy's song "Missile" was the soundtrack on the trailer for Series 2 of Poldark on BBC One.

=== 2017–2019: 28 Days in the Valley ===
On May 5, 2017, Dorothy released "Down to the Bottom" a standalone single. The song would go on to be featured in Forza Horizon 4

On November 3, 2017, Dorothy's song "Naked Eye" was featured on the soundtrack for the documentary film Served Like a Girl.

In an interview with GSLM on December 20, 2017, Martin announced the band's second studio album, called 28 Days in the Valley. She described the album as having a "more feminine energy... It has a lighter and brighter feel, with less metal influence and more Stones. It has a cool desert vibe." The album was released on March 16, 2018, and a remixed version of the album's track "Freedom" (featuring Angel Haze and remixed by TROY NōKA) was released on April 26, 2019. In 2019, Dorothy went on tour with opener Spirit Animal.

On November 30, 2018, Dorothy appeared along with Dolly Parton on the soundtrack album for Parton's film "Dumplin'".

On November 8, 2019, Dorothy's song "Gun in My Hand" was featured in the 20/20 episode "Growing Up Buttafuoco".

=== 2020–present: Gifts from the Holy Ghost and Thrive in the Darkness EP ===
On January 10, 2021, Martin announced via her Twitter account that her new album would be called Gifts from the Holy Ghost. In an interview with WRIF, she revealed the name of the album came to her following an incident where she claimed to have witnessed her guitar tech die from a heroin overdose and then return to life. "I come out and see him and he's blue and green, and I knew he was dead at the moment. I just knew it, I don't know if anyone's had this experience. I'm pretty sure you know a dead body when you see one. [...] I'm just sitting there breathing and holding hands with my sound engineer. I'm like, 'Whoever's out there, just send him back. Give him another chance.' After a few moments of silence, this voice said to me, 'Okay, we're sending him back now.' And then I open my eyes, all the color had returned to his skin. He opened his eyes, and he was alive, and I couldn't believe it." Gifts from the Holy Ghost was released on April 22, 2022.

In 2024, she had a guest appearance on Slash's album Orgy of the Damned with a rendition of "Key to the Highway"

In May of 2026, Sam Bam Koltun would announce his departure from the band to pursue his role as the lead guitarist in Godsmack.

== Discography ==
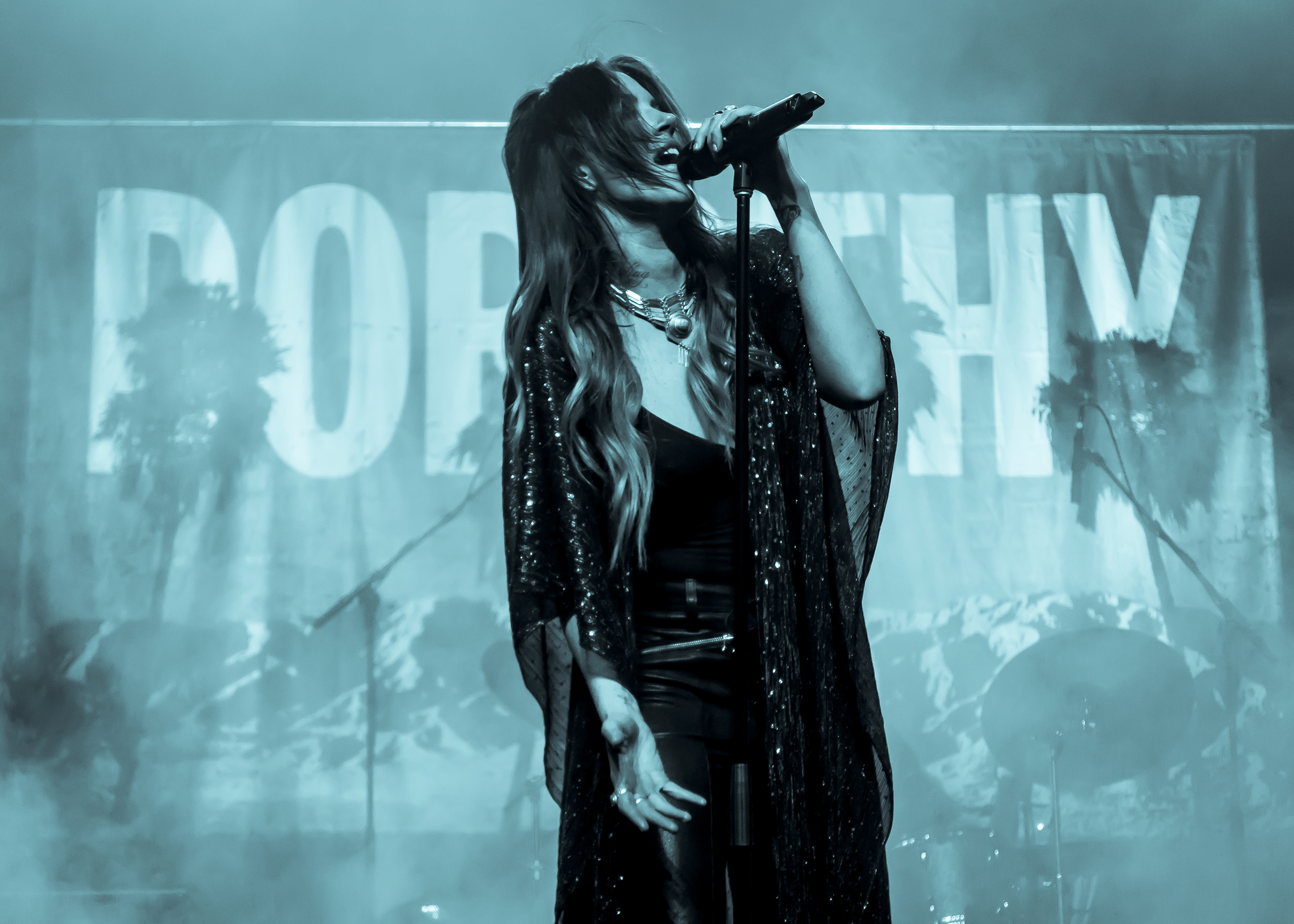
Dorothy performing at The Fonda Theatre in Los Angeles in 2018

=== Studio albums ===
Title	Album details
Rockisdead	Released: June 24, 2016; Label: Roc Nation; Formats: CD, LP, digital download
28 Days in the Valley	Released: March 16, 2018; Label: Roc Nation; Formats: CD, LP, digital download
Gifts from the Holy Ghost	Released: April 22, 2022; Label: Roc Nation; Formats: CD, LP, digital download
The Way	Released: March 14, 2025; Label: Roc Nation; Formats: CD, LP, digital download

=== Extended plays ===
Title	Extended play details
Dorothy	Released: December 15, 2014; Label: Claray; Formats: 12", digital download
Thrive in the Darkness	Released: June 6, 2021; Label: Roc Nation; Formats: Digital download

=== Singles ===
Title	Year	Peak chart positions				Album
Title	Year	US Hot Hard Rock	US Main	US Rock Air.	FRA	Album
"After Midnight"	2014	—	—	—	—	Dorothy
"Wild Fire"	2014	—	—	—	—	Dorothy
"Wicked Ones"	2014	—	—	—	117	Dorothy
"Gun in My Hand"	2015	—	—	—	—	Dorothy
"Bang Bang Bang"	2015	—	—	—	—	Dorothy
"Raise Hell"	2015	—	31	—	—	Rockisdead
"Get Up"	2016	—	—	—	—	Non-album single
"Missile"	2016	—	—	—	—	Rockisdead
"Dark Nights"	2016	—	36	—	—	Rockisdead
"Down to the Bottom"	2017	—	35	—	—	Non-album single
"Flawless"	2018	—	8	28	—	28 Days in the Valley
"Who Do You Love"	2018	—	28	—	—	28 Days in the Valley
"What's Coming to Me"	2021	—	35	—	—	Non-album single
"Rest in Peace"	2022	15	2	13	—	Gifts from the Holy Ghost
"Black Sheep"	2022	—	9	21	—	Gifts from the Holy Ghost
"Beautiful Life"	2022	—	—	—	—	Gifts from the Holy Ghost
"MUD"	2024	21	3	15	—	The Way
"The Devil I Know"	2024	—	—	—	—	The Way
"I Come Alive"	2024	—	—	—	—	The Way
"Tombstone Town" (feat. Slash)	2025	25	15	34	—	The Way
"Bones"	2025	—	33	—	—	The Way
"—" denotes a recording that did not chart or was not released in that territory.

=== As featured artist ===
Title	Year	Peak chart positions		Album
Title	Year	US Hot Hard Rock	US Main	Album
"Living Dangerous" (Tempt feat. Dorothy)	2021	—	—	Tempt
"Victorious" (Nita Strauss feat. Dorothy)	2023	—	16	The Call of the Void
"If These Walls Could Talk" (Scott Stapp feat. Dorothy)	2024	—	—	Higher Power
"Better Days" (Staind feat. Dorothy)	2024	18	7	Confessions of the Fallen
"Key to the Highway" (Slash feat. Dorothy) (Charlie Segar cover)	2024	—	—	Orgy of the Damned

=== Music videos ===
Title	Year	Director(s)
"After Midnight"	2014	George Robertson
"Wicked Ones"	2015	George Robertson
"Raise Hell"	2015	Emma Sydney Menzies
"Get Up"	2016	
"Dark Nights"	2016	Chris Marrs Piliero
"Down To The Bottom"	2017	Ariel Vida
"Flawless"	2018	Kii Arens
"Who Do You Love"	2018	Angela Izzo, Eric Zimmerman, Kerry Brown
"Freedom"	2019	Lisa Bonet
"What's Coming To Me"	2021	Linda Strawberry
"Rest In Peace"	2022	Nick Peterson
"A Beautiful Life"	2022	Nick Peterson
"Black Sheep"	2022	Nick Peterson
"MUD"	2024	Rich Ragsdale
"Tombstone Town"	2025	Rich Ragsdale

== Band members ==
Current members

- Dorothy Martin – lead vocals (2014–present)
- Nick Perri – guitar (2018–2019, 2026–present)
- Eliot Lorango – bass, backing vocals (2014, 2017–present)
- Jake Hayden – drums, percussion (Fill in 2018, 2019. Officially from 2021–present)

Former members

- Sam "Bam" Koltun – guitar (2020–2026)
- Zac Morris – drums, percussion (2014–2016)
- Gregg Cash – bass guitar (2014–2017)
- Mark Jackson – guitar (2014–2016)
- Nick Maybury – guitar (2017–2018)
- Owen Barry – guitar (2018)
- Devon Pangle – guitar (2019)
- Eli Wulfmeier – guitar, backing vocals (2017–2019)
- Jason Ganberg – drums, percussion (2017–2020)

Timeline
