= Strange Days (The Struts album) =

Studio album by The Struts
- Released: 16 October 2020
- Genres: Glam rock; hard rock
- Length: 43:07
- Label: Interscope
- Producer: Jon Levine

The Struts chronology
Young & Dangerous (2018)	Strange Days (2020)	Pretty Vicious (2023)

Singles from Strange Days
- 1. "Another Hit of Showmanship (with Albert Hammond Jr.)" Released: 28 August 2020; 2. "Strange Days (with Robbie Williams)" Released: 2 September 2020; 3. "I Hate How Much I Want You (with Phil Collen & Joe Elliott of Def Leppard)" Released: 8 October 2020

Strange Days is the third album by British glam rock band The Struts, released on 16 October 2020 through Interscope Records. It was recorded at producer Jon Levine's home studio during a COVID-19 lockdown over a period of ten days.

"Another Hit of Showmanship" (with Albert Hammond Jr.), "Strange Days" (with Robbie Williams), and "I Hate How Much I Want You" (with Phil Collen & Joe Elliott of Def Leppard) were released as singles prior to its release. Originally scheduled for 2020 and rescheduled due to COVID-19 restrictions, the band embarked on the Strange Days Are Over tour in support of the album in August 2021.

== Release and promotion ==
On June 12, 2021, a limited run of clear vinyl pressings of the album were released as a part of Record Store Day. Also included with the album was a poster of the band featuring a letter to fans on the reverse.

=== Tour ===
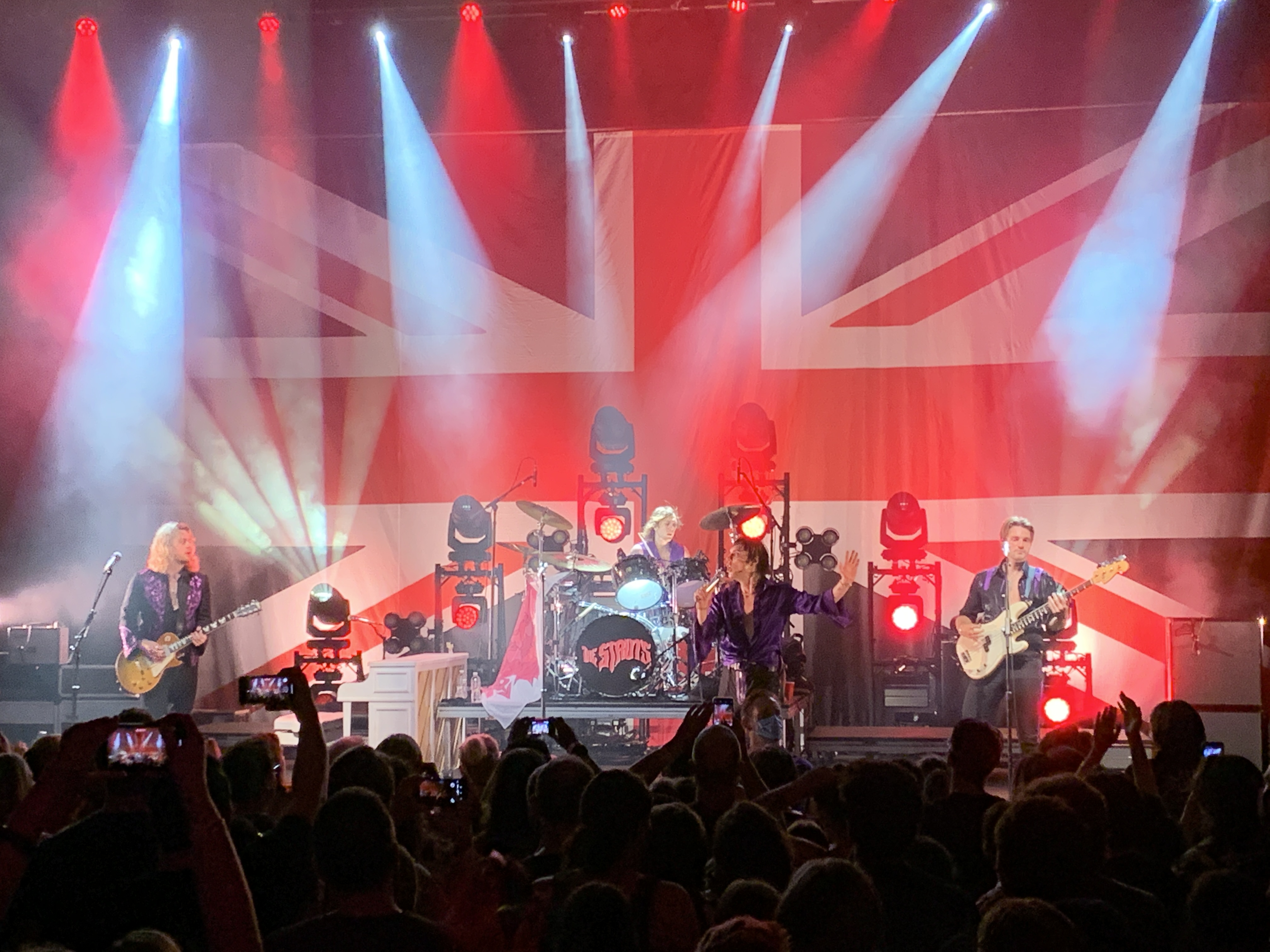
The Struts performing at The Riviera Theatre in Chicago during the Strange Days Are Over Tour, September 14, 2021

To promote Strange Days, The Struts launched the Strange Days Are Over Tour on 31 March 2021 in St. Petersburg, Florida. The first tour announcement included 16 shows, with the last in New York City, on 8 October 2021. A second set of 18 shows was announced on June 22, 2021, beginning in Albany, New York on October 12 and ending on November 5 in Tempe, Arizona. In addition to their own headlining tour, the Struts also supported Shinedown for six shows during this period.

== Track listing ==
No.	Title	Writer(s)	Producer(s)	Length
1.	"Strange Days (with Robbie Williams)"	Luke Spiller; Adam Slack; Jed Elliott; Gethin Davies; Jon Levine	Jon Levine	4:53
2.	"All Dressed Up (With Nowhere To Go)"	Spiller; Slack; Elliott; Davies; Levine	Jon Levine	3:51
3.	"Do You Love Me"	Paul Stanley; Kim Fowley; Bob Ezrin	Jon Levine	3:23
4.	"I Hate How Much I Want You (with Phil Collen & Joe Elliott of Def Leppard)"	Spiller; Slack; Elliott; Davies; Levine	Jon Levine	3:23
5.	"Wild Child (with Tom Morello)"	Spiller; Slack; Elliott; Davies; Levine	Jon Levine	3:42
6.	"Cool"	Spiller; Slack; Elliott; Davies; Levine	Jon Levine	6:21
7.	"Burn It Down"	Spiller; Slack; Elliott; Davies; Levine	Jon Levine	4:46
8.	"Another Hit of Showmanship (with Albert Hammond Jr.)"	Spiller; Slack; Elliott; Davies; Albert Hammond Jr.; Levine	Jon Levine	3:42
9.	"Can't Sleep"	Spiller; Slack; Elliott; Davies; Levine	Jon Levine	3:14
10.	"Am I Talking To The Champagne (Or Talking To You)"	Spiller; Slack; Elliott; Davies; Levine	Jon Levine	5:47
Total length:				43:07

== Personnel ==
=== The Struts ===
- Luke Spiller – lead vocals, piano
- Adam Slack – guitar, backing vocals
- Jed Elliot – bass guitar, backing vocals
- Gethin Davies – drums

=== Featured additional musicians ===
- Robbie Williams – vocals (on "Strange Days")
- Albert Hammond Jr. – guitar (on "Another Hit of Showmanship")
- Phil Collen – guitar (on "I Hate How Much I Want You")
- Joe Elliott – vocals (on "I Hate How Much I Want You")
- Tom Morello – guitar (on "Wild Child")
- Albert Hammond Jr. – guitar (on "Another Hit of Showmanship")

=== Additional musicians ===
- Erasmo Solerti – violin (1), viola (1)
- Marianela Cordero – cello (1)
- Nylo – additional vocals (6, 10)
- Rachel Mazer – horns (2), saxophone (10)

=== Production ===
- Jon Levine – producer
