= Young & Dangerous (album) =

Studio album by The Struts
- Released: 26 October 2018
- Genre: Glam rock; hard rock
- Length: 45:01
- Label: Interscope
- Producer: Butch Walker; Sam Hollander

The Struts chronology
| Everybody Wants (2014) | Young & Dangerous (2018) | Strange Days (2020) |

Singles from Young & Dangerous
- 1. "Body Talks" Released: 15 June 2018; 2. "Primadonna Like Me" Released: 13 August 2018; 3. "Bulletproof Baby" Released: 13 September 2018; 4. "Fire (Part 1)" Released: 5 October 2018; 5. "In Love With A Camera" Released: 11 April 2019

Young & Dangerous (stylised as YOUNG&DANGEROUS) is the second album by British glam rock band The Struts, released on 26 October 2018 through Interscope Records. It was primarily recorded while the band was on tour; "Primadonna Like Me", "Body Talks" and "Bulletproof Baby" were released as singles prior to its release. The album title comes from lines in the choruses of both "Fire - Part 1" and "Freak Like You." The band began a world tour in September 2018 in support of the album.

== Critical reception ==
Professional ratings
Aggregate scores
| Source | Rating |
|---|---|
| Metacritic | 81/100 |
Review scores
| Source | Rating |
| AllMusic | 4/5 stars |
| Drowned in Sound | 7/10 |
| Rolling Stone | 3.5/5 stars |
| The Spill Magazine | 4/5 stars |

The album has received a score of 81 on review aggregator Metacritic, based on reviews from six critics. Will Hermes of Rolling Stone gave the album three-and-a-half stars out of five, and said that while "Kiss This" was the band's "first notable achievement, their second LP advances the notion that maybe ignoring the last 30 or 40 years of pop trends isn't the best approach". Hermes highlighted the style of frontman Luke Spiller, calling "Ashes (Part 2)" "a cross between a Bat Out of Hell outtake and hairmetal Maroon 5". He also deemed "Body Talks" the "Kiss This" of the album, calling it "an over the top chant-pop anthem that's winning on first listen, irritating soon after", saying that even "if it fails to be more than the sum of its 'woo!'s, it's still effective, and gets bonus points for the remix with Kesha". The song "Bulletproof Baby" is featured on EA Sports' video game NHL 19. The song "One Night Only" was used in a tribute video by the Pittsburgh Penguins to honor Vegas Golden Knights goaltender Marc-Andre Fleury in his first game at PPG Paints Arena since his trade in June of 2017.

== Track listing ==
| No. | Title | Writer(s) | Producer(s) | Length |
|---|---|---|---|---|
| 1. | "Body Talks" | Luke Spiller; Adam Slack; Lauren Christy; Jon Levine | Lauren Christy; Jon Levine | 2:58 |
| 2. | "Primadonna Like Me" | Spiller; Slack; Nigel Butler; Ray Hedges | Nigel Butler; Ray Hedges | 3:23 |
| 3. | "In Love with a Camera" | Spiller; Slack; Butler; Hedges; Christy; Levine | Nigel Butler; Ray Hedges | 3:22 |
| 4. | "Bulletproof Baby" | Spiller; Slack; Christy; Levine | Lauren Christy; Jon Levine | 3:13 |
| 5. | "Who Am I?" | Spiller; Slack; Butler; Hedges; Christy; Levine | Nigel Butler; Ray Hedges | 3:16 |
| 6. | "People" | Spiller; Slack; Christy; Levine | Lauren Christy; Jon Levine | 3:28 |
| 7. | "Fire (Part 1)" | Spiller; Slack; Jed Elliott; Butch Walker | Butch Walker | 4:12 |
| 8. | "Somebody New" | Spiller; Slack; Elliott; Gethin Davies | Nick Lashley; Gregg Alexander; Luke Spiller | 3:57 |
| 9. | "Tatler Magazine" | Spiller; Slack; Elliott | Nick Lashley; Gregg Alexander; Luke Spiller | 3:04 |
| 10. | "I Do It So Well" | Spiller; Slack; Christy; Levine | Lauren Christy; Jon Levine | 3:18 |
| 11. | "Freak Like You" | Spiller; Slack; Kevin Griffin; Sam Hollander; Grant Michaels | Kevin Griffin; Sam Hollander | 3:17 |
| 12. | "Ashes (Part 2)" | Spiller; Slack; Rick Parkhouse; George Tizzard; Josh Wilkinson | Rick Parkhouse; George Tizzard | 4:36 |
| 13. | "Body Talks" (featuring Kesha) | Spiller; Slack; Christy; Levine | Lauren Christy; Jon Levine | 2:57 |
| Total length: | | | | 45:01 |

Young & Dangerous – Japanese Edition (2018)
| No. | Title | Writer(s) | Producer(s) | Length |
|---|---|---|---|---|
| 14. | "21st Century Dandy" | Spiller; Slack; Butler; Hedges | Nigel Butler; Ray Hedges | 3:58 |
| 15. | "One Night Only" | Spiller; Slack; Wilkinson; John Feldmann | Butch Walker | 4:16 |

Young & Dangerous – Japanese Tour Edition (2019)
| No. | Title | Writer(s) | Producer(s) | Length |
|---|---|---|---|---|
| 16. | "Dancing in the Street" (Martha and the Vandellas cover; based on the version by Van Halen) | Marvin Gaye; William Stevenson; Ivy Jo Hunter; David Lee Roth; Eddie Van Halen; Michael Anthony; Alex Van Halen (arr.) | Nigel Butler; Ray Hedges | 3:50 |
| 17. | "Pegasus Seiya" (Make-Up cover) | Machiko Ryu; Tim Jensen | Nigel Butler; Ray Hedges | 3:25 |
| Total length: | | | | 60:30 |

== Charts ==
| Chart (2018) | Peak position |
|---|---|
| Japan Hot Albums (Billboard Japan) | 99 |
| Japanese Albums (Oricon) | 60 |
| Scottish Albums (OCC) | 44 |
| UK Albums (OCC) | 77 |
| US Billboard 200 | 102 |
| US Top Alternative Albums (Billboard) | 7 |
| US Top Rock Albums (Billboard) | 13 |
