= Pretty Vicious (album) =

Studio album by The Struts
- Released: 3 November 2023
- Studio: East Iris Studios (Nashville)
- Genre: Glam rock; hard rock
- Length: 44:42
- Label: Big Machine
- Producer: Julian Raymond; Natt Webb; The Struts

The Struts chronology
Strange Days (2020)	Pretty Vicious (2023)

Singles from Pretty Vicious
- 1. "Too Good At Raising Hell" Released: 30 June 2023; 2. "Rockstar" Released: 8 September 2023; 3. "Pretty Vicious" Released: 19 October 2023

Pretty Vicious is the fourth studio album by British glam rock band The Struts, released on 3 November 2023 through Big Machine Label Group.

Professional ratings
Review scores
Source	Rating
Classic Rock	4/5 stars
Cryptic Rock	4.5/5 stars
Kerrang!	3/5 stars

== Artwork ==
The cover art marked the first appearance of the band's updated logo on a studio album. This new logo was first seen with the release of the single "Fallin' With Me" in 2022.

The front and back cover photography were done by Joseph Lynn, and the graphic design of the album artwork was done by Holly McBryde.

== Release and promotion ==
=== Tour ===
The Struts announced a tour in support of the album release that included shows across North America and several festival appearances in Europe. The tour kicked off on April 13, 2024, in Laval, Quebec and concluded on August 31, 2024, in Anaheim, California.

== Track listing ==
No.	Title	Writer(s)	Producer(s)	Length
1.	"Too Good At Raising Hell"	Luke Spiller; Adam Slack; Jayson DeZuzio; Nolan Sipe	Julian Raymond; The Struts	3:49
2.	"Pretty Vicious"	Spiller; Slack; Joe Janiak	Julian Raymond; The Struts	5:10
3.	"I Won't Run"	Spiller; Slack; Rick Parkhouse; George Tizzard; Josh Wilkinson	Julian Raymond; The Struts	4:05
4.	"Hands On Me"	Spiller; Slack; SACCO; Riley Thomas	Julian Raymond; The Struts	3:31
5.	"Do What You Want"	Spiller; Slack; Sarah Hudson; Jesse Saint John; Eman Kiriakou	Julian Raymond; The Struts	3:32
6.	"Rockstar"	Spiller; Slack; Nigel Butler; Ray Hedges	Julian Raymond; The Struts	3:28
7.	"Remember The Name"	Spiller; Slack; Butler; Hedges	Julian Raymond; The Struts	4:06
8.	"Bad Decisions"	Spiller; Slack; Jamie Hartman	Julian Raymond; The Struts	3:45
9.	"Better Love"	Spiller; Slack; Gethin Davies; Jed Elliott; Marti Frederiksen; Matthew Marino; Mike Pepe	Julian Raymond; The Struts	4:40
10.	"Gimme Some Blood"	Spiller; Slack	Natt Webb	4:06
11.	"Somebody Someday"	Ian Hunter	Julian Raymond; The Struts	4:26
Total length:				44:42

== Personnel ==
=== The Struts ===
- Luke Spiller – lead vocals, background vocals, production
- Adam Slack – guitar, production
- Jed Elliot – bass guitar, production
- Gethin Davies – drums, production

=== Additional Musicians ===
- Tom Bukovac – guitar
- Tim Lauer – keyboards, piano (11), B-3 organ (11)
- Dino Franchi – piano (10)
- Steve Patrick – trumpet (1, 5, 7, 9, 10)
- Barry Green – trombone (1, 5, 7, 9, 10)
- Mark Douthit – saxophone (1, 5, 7, 9, 10)
- Jovan Quallo – saxophone (1, 5, 7, 9, 10), flute (1, 5, 7, 9, 10)
- David Angell – violin (11)
- Jenny Bifano – violin (11)
- Alicia Enstrom – violin (11)
- Jung Min Shin – violin (11)
- Chris Farrell – viola (11)
- Kristin Wilkinson – viola (11)
- Kevin Bate – cello (11)
- Carole Rabinowitz – cello (11)

=== Technical ===
- Julian Raymond – production (on all tracks except "Gimme Some Blood")
- Natt Webb – production (on "Gimme Some Blood")
- Scott Borchetta – executive production
- Howard Willing – recording
- Trenton Woodman – recording assistance
- Louis Remenapp – recording assistance
- Lars Fox – engineering, editing
- Chris Lord-Alge – mixing
- Brian Judd – mixing assistance
- Adam Chagnon – engineering assistance
- Ted Jensen – mastering
