= Rockisdead =

Studio album by Dorothy
- Released: June 24, 2016
- Genre: Rock
- Length: 34:57
- Label: Roc Nation
- Producer: Mark Jackson; Ian Scott

Dorothy chronology
Dorothy (2014)	Rockisdead (2016)	28 Days in the Valley (2018)

Singles from Dorothy
- 1. "After Midnight" Released: 2014; 2. "Wicked Ones" Released: October 27, 2014; 3. "Gun In My Hand" Released: 2015; 4. "Raise Hell" Released: August 21, 2015; 5. "Missile" Released: July 15, 2016; 6. "Dark Nights" Released: 2017

Rockisdead (stylized as ROCKISDEAD) is the debut studio album by American rock band Dorothy, released on June 24, 2016 by Roc Nation. It includes the singles "After Midnight", "Wicked Ones", "Gun in My Hand", "Missile", and "Raise Hell", which has been featured in promos for Pandora, HBO shows, Levi's, Call of Duty: Infinite Warfare, Acura, Orange Is the New Black, Now You See Me 2 and the WWE Mae Young Classic.

== Reception ==
The album received generally favorable reviews. Matt Stereo of Stereo Champions said that "DOROTHY is loud, triumphant, confident arena rock at its absolute finest and ROCKISDEAD is not an album to be missed." Shauna Brock of Hard Attack Magazine called the album "one of those albums that rock writers yearn for and should be held up as one of the best of the year." In a more critical review, Stephen Thomas Erlewine of Allmusic criticized the band for being "designed to please crowds" and lacking ambition, concluding that the album "works because it's transparent trash so desperate to be dirty."

In December 2016, Brian Shea of Game Informer listed Rockisdead as #4 on his list of his 10 favorite rock albums from 2016.

Professional ratings
Review scores
Source	Rating
Allmusic	3.5/5 stars
Cryptic Rock	5/5 stars
Mind Equals Blown	7/10
Muzoic	4/5 stars

== Track listing ==
All tracks are written by Dorothy Martin, Ian Scott and Mark Jackson, except where noted. All songs produced by Scott and Jackson.

No.	Title	Writer(s)	Length
1.	"Kiss It"		2:33
2.	"Dark Nights"		3:09
3.	"Raise Hell"	Martin; Scott; Jackson; George Matthew Robertson	3:01
4.	"Wicked Ones"		2:52
5.	"Gun in My Hand"	Martin; Scott; Jackson; Robertson	3:20
6.	"Medicine Man"		3:19
7.	"Woman"		3:41
8.	"Whiskey Fever"		2:37
9.	"After Midnight"	Martin; Scott; Jackson; Robertson	2:29
10.	"Missile"	Martin; Scott; Jackson; Robertson	3:24
11.	"Shelter"		4:32

== Charts ==
Chart (2016)	Peak position
US Billboard 200	129
US Heatseekers Albums (Billboard)	1
US Top Hard Rock Albums (Billboard)	5
US Top Rock Albums (Billboard)	16
