= Stickup Kid =

American rock band

- Origin: San Jose, California
- Genres: Pop punk
- Years active: 2009-present
- Label: Adeline Records
- Members: Tony Geravesh (vocals); Bo McDowell (guitar); Curtis Wallace ( guitar); Jonathan McMaster (bass); Cameron MacBain (drums)
- Past members: Nick Ertman (fill in guitar)
- Website: http://stickupkidca.com/

Stickup Kid is an American Rock band from San Jose, California that formed in January 2009. The band consists of vocalist Tony Geravesh, guitarist Bo McDowell, bassist Jonathan McMaster, drummer Cameron MacBain, and guitarist Curtis Wallace. They have released three EP's, Fight Nothing (2009), Nothing About Me (2012), Debris (2016) and three full-length albums The Sincerest Form of Flattery (2011), Future Fire (2013), Soul Drive (2019). Stickup Kid were signed to Warner Music Group's Adeline Records, who distributed both Nothing About Me and Future Fire. The band self-released their EP Debris (2016), as well as their album Soul Drive (2019). They are currently in the studio.

== Discography ==
Studio albums

- The Sincerest Form of Flattery (2011)
- Future Fire (2013)
- Soul Drive (2019)

EPs

- Fight Nothing (2009)
- Nothing About Me (2012)
- Debris (2016)
