= Wild Party =

American pop-rock band

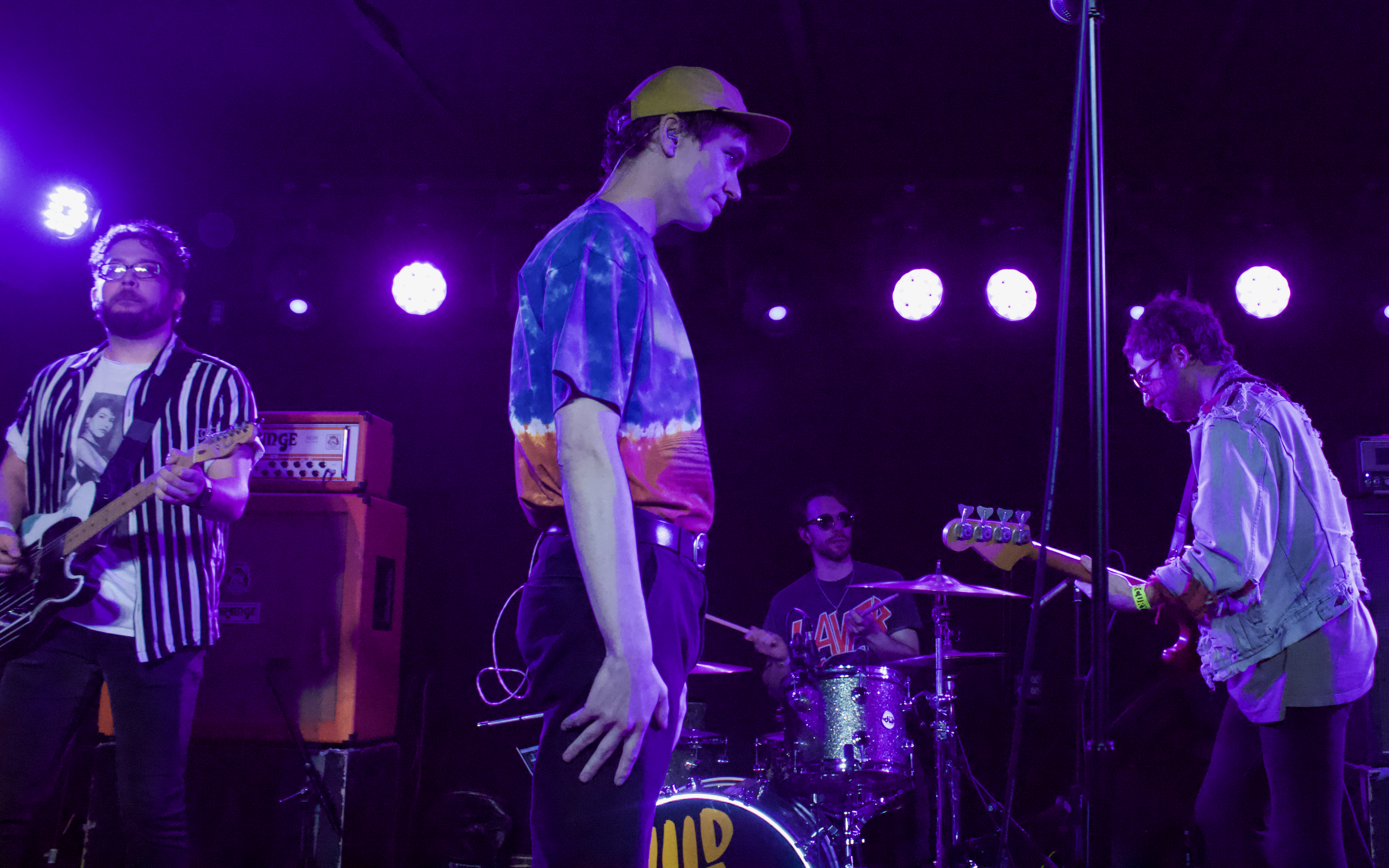
- Wild Party playing at the Mercury Lounge in 2024. Left to right: Lucas Hughes, Lincoln Kreifels, Cary LaScala, and Ethan Kaufmann.

Background information
- Origin: San Antonio, Texas
- Genres: Pop-rock; alternative; Indie-pop
- Years active: 2009–2014; 2019–present
- Labels: Old Friends Records; Foothill Arcade Records
- Members: Lincoln Kreifels (vocals); Lucas Hughes (guitar); Ethan Kaufmann (bass); Cary LaScala (drums)
- Past members: Jake Kreifels (bass); Jared Shotwell (drums)
- Website: wildparty.band

Wild Party is an American four-piece pop rock/indie pop band from San Antonio, Texas.

== History ==
=== Pre-2011 ===
Lincoln Kreifels and Lucas Hughes met at 12 in the seventh grade playing middle school football. They didn't care for or play much football, but they shared an interest in music. Both began learning guitar in the seventh grade, but Hughes got better than Kreifels, so Kreifels started to focus on vocals. The two started making music and producing demos on their laptops in their bedrooms.

After deciding to pursue music more seriously in their senior year at Boerne High School, they made a song. Kreifels tapped his older brother Jake to play bass. Jake, in turn, introduced Ethan Kaufmann as a drummer, to the band after Jake sent Kaufmann a demo. The four then worked on music for about a year. To play live, Kaufmann recruited drummer Cary LaScala, who he previously played in a band with, to join, and LaScala eventually replaced Jake as bassist.

In 2010, the band opened for The Wombats in Europe for two weeks. At the time, Kreifels was 19, and had previously only played two live shows. The band was connected through a mutual friend in the music business. They also opened for Andrew McMahon, Fitz and the Tantrums, and Catfish and the Bottlemen.

=== 2013–2014: Phantom Pop ===
The band took a brief hiatus in 2011. They regrouped to release their first album, Phantom Pop, independently in 2013. The band originally released the album in early 2013, but they had pulled it shortly afterwards in order to re-record and remix it. The album released again on October 7, 2014, under the label of Old Friends Records. Some of the songs on the album were written in 2008. When the music video of "When I Get Older" released in 2013, Lincoln had spammed the comment sections of popular YouTube videos linking to it.

Kreifels left to go to college in Oklahoma, still writing music, but later dropped out to focus on music writing.

The band suddenly halted as they were picking up steam. Kreifels said the band stopped because "it just wasn't picking up traction." He waited tables to support his new family to keep his options open in the future, and once the impact of the COVID-19 pandemic on the restaurant industry in the United States hit, he entered a full-time job in warehouse fulfillment who has allowed him to tour.

=== 2022–present ===
The band experienced a resurgence in popularity on Spotify in 2022. Their first show in eight years happened at the start of 2023. Kreifels toured solo later that June, and the whole band began the 10th anniversary tour at the end of the year. Their second album, Cheeky Giants, released on May 9, 2025.

== Style ==
Lincoln Kreifels says their songs are about "dreams versus reality." Hughes says their songs are "both introspective and extrospective." The name 'Wild Party' was meant to be sarcastic and ironic:

Lucas and I used to have hour-long conversations spitting out band names back and forth in high school. We were bored as shit and didn’t have anything else to do, got to Wild Party and thought, hey that might work. Didn’t realize we’d have to live up to that name someday! But l like that it’s kind of ballsy. It makes us have to be confident. People are interested: "Who’s got the balls to call themselves Wild Party?"

— Lincoln Kreifels, in a Vice interview.

== Discography ==
=== Phantom Pop (2014) ===
All tracks are written by Ethan Kaufmann, Lincoln Kriefels, and Lucas Hughes.

No.	Title	Length
1.	"When I Get Older"	3:04
2.	"OutRight"	2:42
3.	"Life's Too Short"	3:41
4.	"Take My Advice"	3:48
5.	"Connect The Dots"	3:36
6.	"Violet"	2:59
7.	"Chasin' Honey"	3:09
8.	"Walkin'"	3:38
9.	"Nicely Done"	3:17
10.	"New Light"	3:35
11.	"Lo-Fi Children"	3:37
12.	"First Two Days With You"	3:53
Total length:		41:05

=== Singles & EPs ===
- "All Nighter"
- "Don't Grow Up Rough"
- "Take My Advice" / "Life's Too Short" (2010)
- "Phantom Vox 2.0" (2014)
- "Getaway" (2019)
- "Recipe" (2019)
- "Coexist" (2021)
- "Hall & Oates" (2022)
- "Embrace It" (2022)
- "Get Up" (2023)
- "Hatchet" (2024)
- "I Just Think I'm Smart" (2024)
- ”Nothin’ At All” (2025)

== See also ==
- Driver Friendly
