= Driver Friendly =

- Also known as: Driver F (2006–08)
- Origin: Austin, Texas, United States
- Years active: 2002–present
- Labels: I Enjoy, Hopeless
- Members: Tyler Welsh; Andy Lane; Jeremi Mattern; Juan Lopez; Andy Rector; Chris Walker; Joe Schumacher
- Past members: Nathan Parrish
- Website: driverf.com

Driver Friendly is an American rock band from Austin, Texas, United States. Driver Friendly has toured with such bands as Motion City Soundtrack, Cartel, Relient K, Hellogoodbye, Night Riots, Hit The Lights, TEAM*, and Warped Tour.

== History ==
=== Early years and early releases (2002–2011) ===
Driver Friendly was formed in 2002 while the members were in high school. The band self-released Live CD from the Engine Room EP on November 30, 2002, and Demolicious EP on March 16, 2003. The band signed to I Enjoy Records on January 31, 2004, and released their debut album, Fly Away, on March 5, 2004. In 2004, the band relocated to Austin, Texas where they self released two albums (Chase the White Whale and Bury A Dream). Not Home Yet EP was released on March 7, 2006. Montclaire Sessions EP was released on January 16, 2007.

=== Hopeless years (2012–present) ===
In 2012, the band released a music video for the song "Messidona" which paid tribute to the band's favorite Tom Hanks films. The music video generated enough buzz to capture a tweet from Tom. The act of having their music video tweeted by Tom Hanks was said to be "The greatest honor in the history of everything." In October 2012, the band announced that they had been signed to Hopeless Records. "Ghosts" was released as a single on October 16, 2012. "Shark Cave" was released as a single on January 15, 2013. "Stand So Tall" was released as a single on May 19, 2014. "Everything Gold" was released as a single on June 6. Unimagined Bridges was available for streaming on July 8, and was released by Hopeless on July 15. The album charted in the U.S. at number 33 on the Billboard Heatseekers chart.

== Band members ==
Current members

- Jeremi Mattern – drums
- Andy Lane – vocals, guitar
- Tyler Welsh – vocals, keyboards
- Juan Lopez – trumpet, backing vocals
- Chris Walker – bass, guitar, keyboards, backing vocals

== Discography ==
Albums

- Fly Away (2004) (I Enjoy)
- Chase the White Whale (2008) (self-released)
- Bury a Dream (2012) (self-released)
- Unimagined Bridges (2014) (Hopeless Records)

EPs

- Live CD from the Engine Room (2002) (self-released)
- Demolicious (2003) (self-released)
- Not Home Yet (2006) (self-released)
- Montclaire Sessions (2007) (self-released)
- Peaks + Valleys (2013) (Hopeless)
- Ceremony (2019) (self-released)

== Music videos ==
- "Two Words, Mr. President: Plausible Deniability" (2008)
- "Temple of Doom" (2008)
- "Messidona" (2012)
- "Ghosts" (2012)
- "Lost Boys" (live) (2013)
- "Run" (2013)
- "Run" (live) (2013)
- "Stand So Tall" (2014)
- "Everything Gold" (2014)
- "Deconstruct You" (2014)
